= Manteca Transit Center =

General information
- Location: 220 Moffat Boulevard; Manteca, California
- Coordinates: 37.795033°N 121.215690°W
- Operator: Manteca Transit; San Joaquin RTD; Stanislaus Regional Transit Authority
- Line: UPRR Fresno Subdivision
- Platforms: 1 side platform (planned)
- Tracks: 1 (+1 planned)

Construction
- Parking: Yes
- Accessible: Yes

History
- Opened: August 6, 2013
- Opening: 2026 (ACE)

Future services
Preceding station	Altamont Corridor Express	Following station
2026
Lathrop/Manteca toward San Jose	San Jose – Ceres	Ripon toward Ceres
North Lathrop toward Natomas/Sacramento Airport	Valley Rail	Ripon toward Ceres
Location

The Manteca Transit Center is the primary public transit hub of Manteca, California. The bus station features five bus bays with Manteca Transit as the primary operator; the agency also maintain their offices at the facility. San Joaquin Regional Transit District and Altamont Corridor Express shuttle routes also serve the transit center. Modesto Area Express (now Stanislaus Regional Transit Authority) service began in July 2020. Altamont Corridor Express commuter rail service is expected to commence at a newly constructed platform along the Union Pacific rail line by 2026 as part of the Merced Extension project.
