= Valley Rail (ACE) =

Passenger railway project in California

Valley Rail is a project to expand Altamont Corridor Express (ACE) and Amtrak California Gold Runner (formerly known as the San Joaquins) commuter rail services, divided into several segments which include two service extensions from Stockton to Sacramento and Merced, station improvements, and grade separation of the Stockton Diamond.

The original ACEforward project was initiated in 2013 to expand ridership by improving service reliability and frequency on the existing route between Stockton and San Jose, and by extending the route east from Stockton to Merced; during its development, financial and logistical challenges were identified which precluded operating more trains on the existing segment, and the Valley Rail project replaced ACEforward in 2017, initially focusing on the eastern extension to Merced. The first environmental impact reports for Valley Rail were released in 2018; funding was secured in 2023, and construction began in 2024.

== Overview ==
Schematic ACE, Capitol Corridor, and Gold Runner (labeled under its former name, San Joaquins) routemap with planned Valley Rail extensions, approximately true for station locations, directions, and distances

The Sacramento Extension will use the Union Pacific Railroad's Sacramento Subdivision between Stockton and Sacramento. In the first phase of the Sacramento Extension, six new stations would be constructed along the line between Natomas and the current eastern ACE terminus in Stockton Downtown (Cabral) station; a layover facility would be built near the new Natomas station in that north Sacramento neighborhood for the second phase. After the first phase, one ACE train would start from Natomas in the morning and continue to San Jose via Stockton, with a corresponding return trip in the afternoon; two round-trip Gold Runner trains would be added, both with Natomas as the northern terminus, operating to either Fresno or Bakersfield. The Gold Runner stop in Stockton would move from San Joaquin Street station to Downtown/Cabral. South of Stockton Downtown/Cabral, the Gold Runner would continue to operate on the Stockton Subdivision.

In addition, the related North Valley Rail project proposes to extend service north from Natomas to Chico. Under the initial operating plan, two daily trains would depart Chico in the mornings, traveling south via Natomas and Stockton Downtown/Cabral; one would continue through and terminate at Union City, while the other would stay in Stockton for a timed transfer to Gold Runner trains. Two afternoon northbound trains would be provided for passengers returning to Chico.

The Merced Extension is divided into two phases, covering Lathrop to Ceres and Ceres to Merced, which will extend service to Ceres and Merced via Lathrop and Modesto. This extension will use the Fresno Subdivision, joining the existing ACE route at a new North Lathrop station, just north of Lathrop/Manteca station. The existing route uses the Oakland Subdivision from Niles to Lathrop and the rail junction between the Fresno and Oakland subdivisions will be rebuilt. Several new stations will be constructed and the line will be double-tracked, extending the eastern ACE terminus to Merced, where a new layover facility would be added. Under the initial operating plans, four trains would start at Merced (Ceres after the first phase) in the mornings, traveling to North Lathrop, with a timed transfer stop for passengers continuing westbound to San Jose. Three trains would continue from North Lathrop to Natomas, where they would be stored for the day; one train would operate a mid-day roundtrip from Natomas to Stockton and back. One train would continue to San Jose. Three or four return trains would be provided from North Lathrop to Merced (Ceres) in the afternoons, timed to allow transfers for passengers eastbound from San Jose.

In addition to the extensions to Sacramento and Ceres/Merced, Valley Rail includes a grade separation for the Stockton Diamond, a major rail junction between the Union Pacific and Burlington Northern Santa Fe, and upgrades to Gold Runner stations, including the relocation of Madera station and construction of Oakley station.

== History ==
ACEforward proposed modifications, including spur line to Union City, tunnel under Altamont Pass, rerouting through Tracy, and extension to Merced.

ACEforward was a project initiated by ACE in 2013 to increase ridership, primarily by improving service frequency and reliability over the existing Stockton–San Jose route, including a proposed tunnel through Altamont Pass, but also by expanding service east from Stockton further into the Central Valley. Full implementation of ACEforward was estimated at US$9.7 billion, a significant financial burden; in addition, logistical and coordination challenges to expanding service were identified. ACE discontinued ACEforward in favor of a new Valley Rail project, which scaled back the older project's scope by focusing initially on the eastern expansion to Merced.

The draft and final environmental impact reports (EIR) for the first segment of the Merced Extension (covering the route from Lathrop to Ceres) was released in 2018. The draft and final EIRs for the second segment (Ceres to Merced) were released in April and November 2021, respectively.

A draft EIR for the Sacramento Extension was released in 2020, with services expected to begin no later than 2023. The North Elk Grove station was removed from Sacramento Extension plans when the final EIR was issued in September 2020; a separate evaluation was performed for a relocated Elk Grove station via draft and final EIRs issued in December 2021 and March 2022, respectively.

The Valley Rail project received funding via California's Transit and Intercity Rail Capital Program in 2023, by which time the project was expected to open in phases beginning in 2025. Later that year, the estimated commencement of services to Ceres and Natomas were again pushed back to 2026, with service to Merced and infill stations opening by 2030.

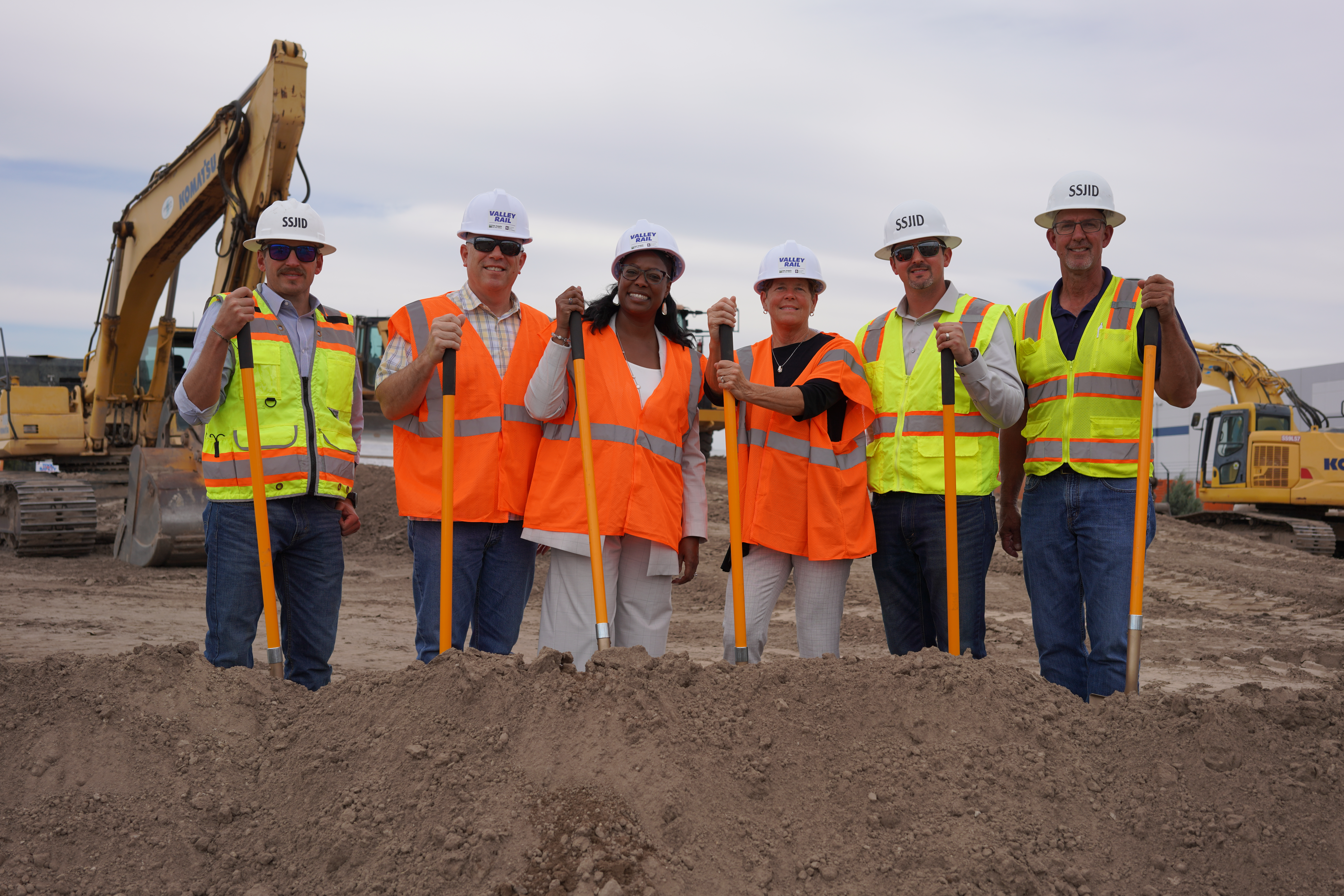
Groundbreaking ceremony for Lathrop Wye Box Culvert (June 2024)

Construction of a concrete box culvert, kicking off the Ceres/Merced Extension, was bid in December 2023 and started in May 2024. The new culvert is required to support upgrades to the Lathrop Wye, and construction is scheduled to take 22 months to complete. A groundbreaking ceremony was held on June 20, 2024.

After considering temporary stations as an alternate, the northern branch of this extension was delayed to 2031, representing a five-year delay. The southern branch of the rail extension no longer has a known target completion date.

== Proposed routes and operations ==
=== Background ===
Amtrak California Gold Runner service connects Bakersfield with Stockton via the former AT&SF route through the California Central Valley; from the Stockton Diamond, most trains turn west to Stockton (San Joaquin Street) station enroute to Oakland–Jack London Square station, while the others continue north to Sacramento station via Stockton Downtown/Cabral and Lodi Transit Station.

ACE service connects Stockton Downtown/Cabral with San Jose Diridon station via the Fresno, Oakland, Niles, and Coast subdivisions, incorporating the former Feather River Route through Altamont Pass. The ACE terminus in Stockton is approximately 1.5 km (0.93 mi) from the Amtrak Gold Runner station on San Joaquin Street for Oakland-bound trains.

=== Merced Extension ===
Merced Extension stations
1 Merced
2 Atwater (alternative)
3 Livingston
4 Turlock
5 Ceres
6 Modesto
7 Ripon
8 Downtown Manteca
9 North Lathrop

From east to west, the stations on the Merced Extension are:

Merced Extension stations
Station	City	Location
Merced	Merced	on R St between W 15th and W 16th
Atwater or Livingston	Atwater	near Applegate Rd / N Winton Way and Atwater Blvd (alternative)
Atwater or Livingston	Livingston	Main St and SR 99
Turlock	Turlock	near North Front St / Golden State Blvd and Fulkerth Rd / W Hawkeye Ave
Ceres	Ceres	on Railroad Ave between Kinser Rd and Central Ave
Modesto	Modesto	at the existing Modesto Transportation Center, between I, K, 8th, and 9th
Ripon	Ripon	near Main St and SR 99
Downtown Manteca	Manteca	at the existing Manteca Transit Center, near S Main St and Moffat Blvd
North Lathrop	Lathrop	on land obtained from Sharpe Army Depot, near W Lathrop Rd and 7th St

The Lathrop Wye connection between the Fresno, Tracy, and Oakland subdivisions will be rebuilt as part of the first phase of the Merced Extension. Part of the reconstruction will include new at-grade crossings of the Fresno Subdivision at McKinley Avenue and S Airport Way. In addition, approximately 51 mi (82 km) of the Fresno Subdivision from Manteca to Merced would be double-tracked, in some cases upgrading existing siding tracks to mainline service.

When the first segment of the Merced Extension is complete, the initial plans are to operate four daily roundtrip trains between Ceres and North Lathrop, starting from Ceres in the mornings, with most continuing westbound passengers transferring to San Jose-bound trains (originating from Stockton) at North Lathrop. A temporary bus bridge would be provided between Ceres and Merced. Once the second segment is complete, the bus bridge between Ceres and Merced will be replaced by rail service. Four trains will originate from Merced instead of Ceres, of which three will run north to Natomas via North Lathrop station, where westbound passengers to San Jose would transfer. One train would run directly from Merced to San Jose. In the afternoons, three return trains would run from Natomas to Merced and one return train would run from San Jose to Merced.

The Valley Link project will extend rail service east from Dublin/Pleasanton station, the terminus of the Bay Area Rapid Transit Blue Line; Valley Link will eventually terminate at the North Lathrop station, serving as a transfer point between Valley Link and ACE. Dublin/Pleasanton is approximately 5 km (3.1 mi) north-northwest of the Pleasanton station currently served by ACE, and the Valley Link route generally would run parallel to and north of ACE between Pleasanton and Lathrop, using the median of I-580 west of Altamont Pass, the same Alameda County Transportation Corridor through the pass, and the Tracy Subdivision east of the pass.

=== Sacramento Extension ===
Sacramento Extension stations
1 Natomas/Sacramento Airport
2 Old North Sacramento
3 Midtown Sacramento
4 City College
5 Elk Grove
6 Lodi
7 Lodi South (alternative)

From north to south, the stations on the Sacramento Extension are:

Sacramento Extension stations
Station	City	Location	Notes / Refs.
Natomas / Sacramento Airport	Sacramento	near the intersection of Blacktop Rd and West Elkhorn Blvd	
Old North Sacramento	Sacramento	near Acoma St and El Monte Ave	
Midtown Sacramento	Sacramento	near Q St between 19th and 20th St	
City College	Sacramento	adjacent to the existing SacRT light rail City College station	
Elk Grove	Elk Grove	originally near the existing SacRT Franklin station on Cosumnes River Blvd; relocated just north of Laguna Blvd	
Lodi	Lodi	near SR 12 and Devries Rd	
Lodi	Lodi	near West Harney Ln and Devries Rd (Lodi South alternative)	

The (north-south) Sacramento Subdivision crosses the (east-west) Martinez Subdivision at the Haggin Wye, east of the existing Sacramento Valley Station (served by Capitol Corridor and some Gold Runner trains) and bracketed by the planned Old North Sacramento and Midtown Sacramento stations (which will be served by ACE and SGold Runner) to the north and south, respectively. The tracks would be realigned just south of the wye.

When the Sacramento Extension is complete, Gold Runner and ACE both would add new trains. Gold Runner would add one roundtrip between Natomas and Fresno and another roundtrip between Natomas and Bakersfield. ACE would add one train originating from Natomas in the mornings, traveling south and west to San Jose via Stockton, with a corresponding return trip from San Jose to Natomas via Stockton in the evenings. In addition, with the completion of the first phase of the Merced Extension, trains originating from Ceres would travel north to Natomas via North Lathrop, returning in the evenings after storage and maintenance at Natomas. ACE also would operate one mid-day roundtrip from Natomas to Stockton and back.

=== Stations ===
Station	Location	Planned opening	Connections
Natomas/Sacramento Airport	Sacramento	2031	Sacramento International Airport (via bus connection); Amtrak: Gold Runner (planned)
Old North Sacramento	Sacramento	TBA	Amtrak: Gold Runner (planned); SacRT light rail: Blue Line (at Globe); RT bus
Midtown Sacramento	Sacramento	Existing	Amtrak: Gold Runner (planned); SacRT light rail: Blue Line, Gold Line (at 16th Street); RT bus
Sacramento City College	Sacramento	TBA	Amtrak: Gold Runner (planned); SacRT light rail: Blue Line; RT bus
Elk Grove	Elk Grove	2031	Amtrak: Gold Runner (planned); E-tran
Lodi	Lodi	TBA	Amtrak: Gold Runner (planned)
North Lathrop	Lathrop	TBA	Valley Link (planned for 2028)
Manteca	Manteca	Existing	Manteca Transit, StanRTA
Ripon	Ripon	Existing	StanRTA
Modesto	Modesto	Existing	Greyhound, StanRTA
Ceres	Ceres	Existing	StanRTA
Turlock	Turlock	Existing	Turlock Transit, StanRTA
Livingston	Livingston	Existing	
Atwater (optional)	Atwater	TBA	
Merced	Merced	Existing	California High-Speed Rail (planned for 2033); Merced County Transit
Madera	Madera	2027	
