= North Lathrop station =

North Lathrop

General information
- Location: West Lathrop Road; Lathrop, California
- Coordinates: 37.8278°N 121.2747°W
- Line: UPRR Oakland Subdivision
- Platforms: 1 island platform (planned)
- Tracks: 2

Construction
- Parking: Yes
- Accessible: Yes

Other information
- Status: under construction

History
- Opening: 2027 (ACE)

Future services
Preceding station	Altamont Corridor Express	Following station
2027
Lathrop/Manteca toward Dublin/Pleasanton	San Jose – Ceres	Ripon toward Ceres
Stockton toward Natomas/Sacramento Airport	Valley Rail	Ripon toward Ceres
Preceding station	Valley Link	Following station
Proposed
River Islands toward Dublin/Pleasanton	Possible future phase Proposed	Terminus
Location

North Lathrop station is a planned Altamont Corridor Express station in Lathrop, California – the second to be constructed in the city. It was expected to open to revenue service in 2023 as part of the first phase of ACE's Merced Extension project to Merced, but was later delayed to 2027.

The station is located on a segment of the former Sharpe Army Depot. Whereas the original Lathrop/Manteca station was sited as a compromise to draw commuters from both cities, this station is located closer to residential areas.

North Lathrop is designed as a transfer station to allow passengers from San Joaquin Valley shuttle trains to transfer to services bound for San Jose. The station is also planned to serve as a future northern terminus of Valley Link, a project by the Tri-Valley-San Joaquin Valley Regional Rail Authority to build a rail connection to Bay Area Rapid Transit's Dublin/Pleasanton station. Up to 3,500 parking spaces may be built to accommodate future park and ride demand by 2040.
