= Lodi Transit Station =

Train station in Lodi, California, US

Lodi, CA
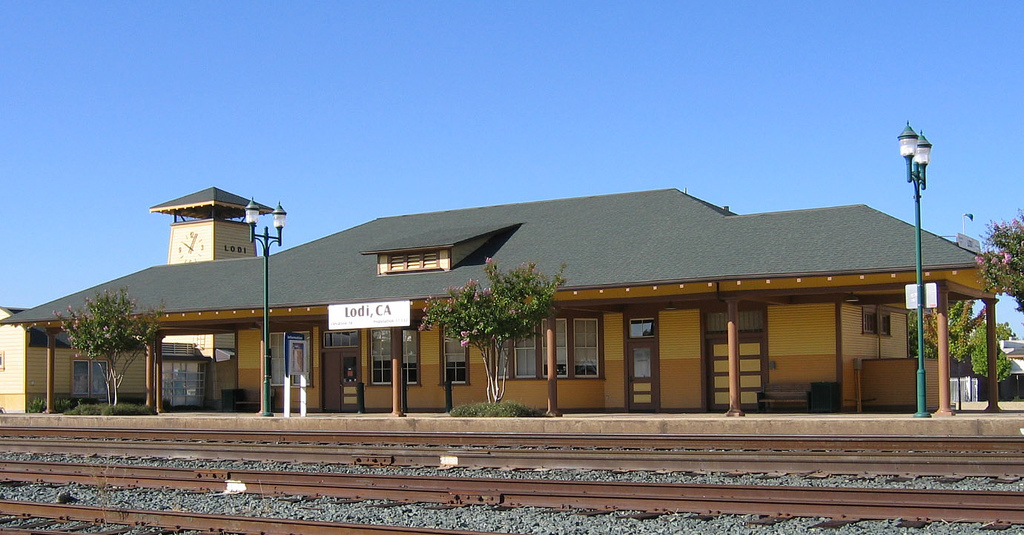
- Track side of the Lodi Transit Station in 2007

General information
- Other names: Lodi Transit Station
- Location: 24 South Sacramento Street; Lodi, California; United States
- Coordinates: 38.1332°N 121.272°W
- Owner: City of Lodi, Union Pacific Railroad
- Line: UP Fresno Subdivision
- Platforms: 1 side platform
- Tracks: 1
- Connections: Amtrak Thruway: 3; Greyhound Lines; Lodi GrapeLine: 1, 2, 3, 4, 5, 22, 30, 31, 34, Express 1, Express 2, Express 6; San Joaquin RTD: 93; South County Transit: Hwy 99 Express

Construction
- Parking: Yes
- Accessible: Yes

Other information
- Status: Unstaffed
- Station code: Amtrak: LOD

History
- Opened: 1869
- Rebuilt: 1907, 2002
- Original company: Central Pacific Railroad

Passengers
- FY 2025: 2,769 (Amtrak)

Services
Preceding station	Amtrak	Following station
Sacramento Terminus	Gold Runner	Stockton–Downtown toward Bakersfield
Former services
Preceding station	Southern Pacific Railroad	Following station
Urgon toward Sacramento	Sacramento – Lathrop	Armstrong toward Lathrop
Terminus	Kentucky House Branch	Lockford toward Valley Spring
Galt toward Sacramento	Sacramento Daylight	Stockton toward Los Angeles
Future services
Preceding station	Altamont Corridor Express	Following station
Elk Grove Opens 2026 toward Natomas/Sacramento Airport	San Jose – Natomas	Stockton toward San Jose or Merced
Preceding station	Amtrak	Following station
Elk Grove Opens 2026 toward Natomas/Sacramento Airport	Gold Runner	Stockton–Downtown toward Bakersfield or Oakland
Location

Lodi Transit Station, or simply Lodi station, is an intermodal transit facility in Lodi, California. It serves the Gold Runner rail line, is the hub for the local Lodi GrapeLine bus service and is also served by other intercity buses.

== History ==
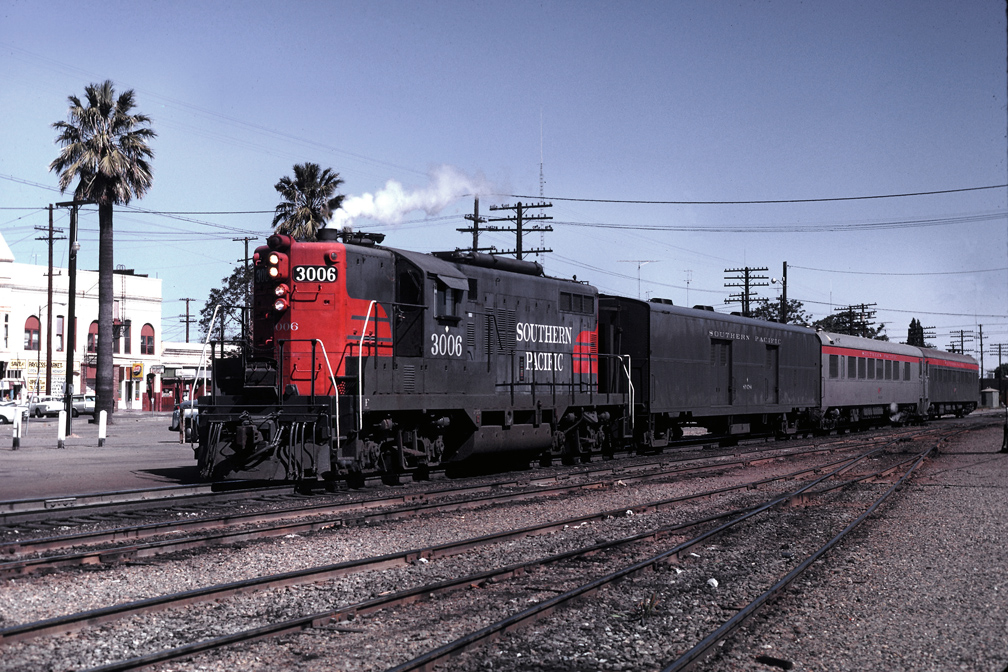
The Sacramento Daylight at Lodi in 1971

Rail service to the area began in 1869, when the Central Pacific Railroad established a depot where the present station stands. Local landowning families had donated the site of the town eventually known as Lodi to the railroad as an incentive to build there. The original building burned down in 1906, and Southern Pacific Railroad, the successor to the Central Pacific, erected a new colonnade-style depot in 1907 half a block to the north. When Amtrak took over passenger rail service in 1971, the Lodi station closed.

In 1993, Amtrak studied the possibility of reopening stops in California's Central Valley, and interest grew in restoring Lodi station. The San Joaquin made a ceremonial stop there in 1999, and the city commenced plans to create an intermodal transit hub, Lodi Transit Station. The $2.3 million project involved moving the 1907 railroad building to its present location on South Sacramento Street to accommodate a new passenger platform, and additions including bus bays, a waiting room, a clock tower, and a Gateway Arch. Full rail service began on March 18, 2002. In 2011, the station saw new additions funded by the American Recovery and Reinvestment Act.

Rail service was temporarily suspended between March 2020 and October 2021 due to the COVID-19 pandemic. As of 2024, Amtrak plans to modify the platform for accessibility later in the 2020s.
