= Robert J. Cabral Station =

Train station in downtown Stockton, California, US

Robert J. Cabral Station Stockton, CA – Downtown
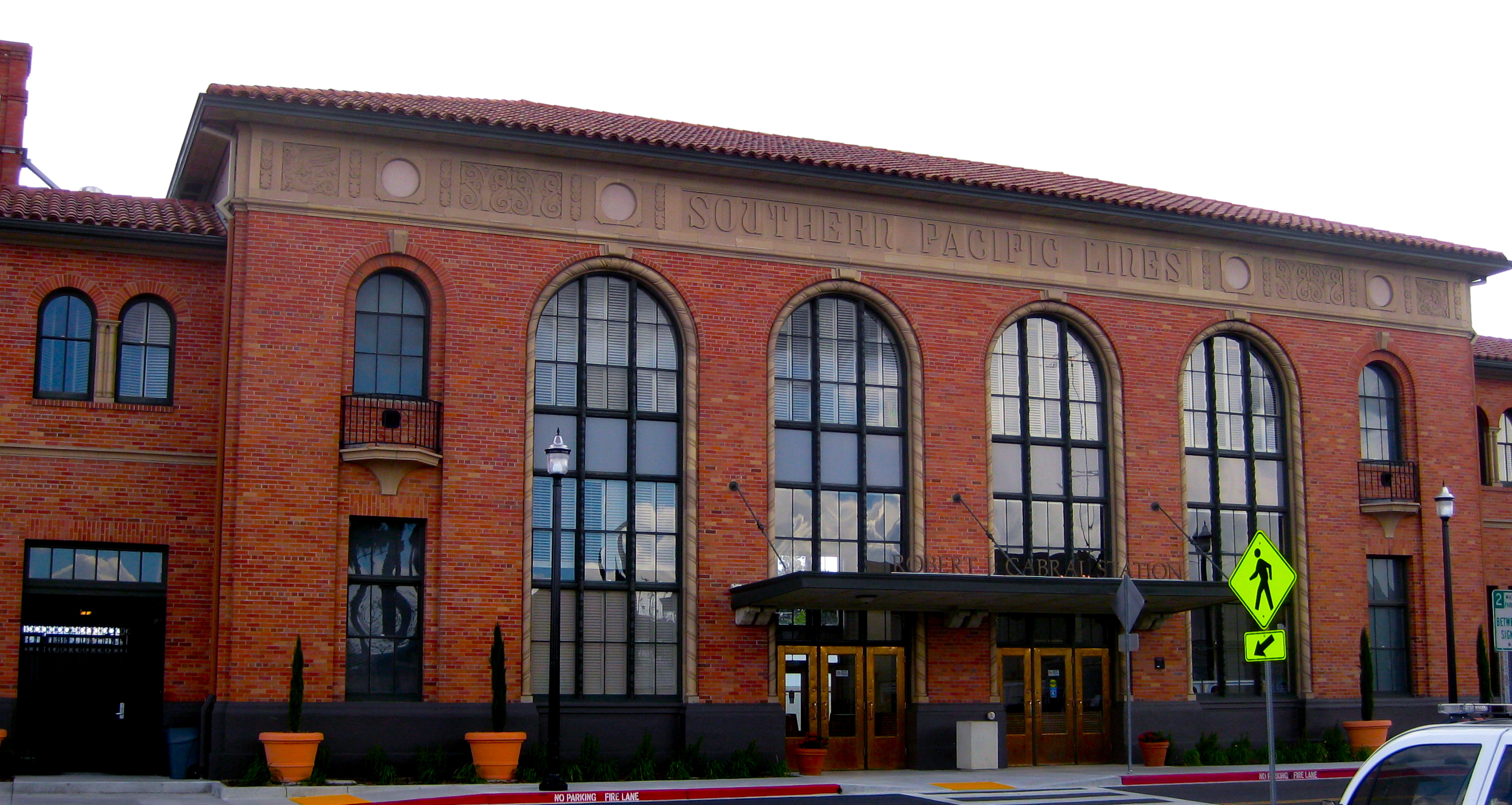
- Front entrance of the Robert J. Cabral Station

General information
- Location: 949 East Channel Street; Stockton, California; United States
- Coordinates: 37°57′25″N 121°16′44″W
- Owner: City of Stockton
- Line: UP Fresno Subdivision
- Platforms: 1 side platform
- Tracks: 3
- Connections: Amtrak Thruway: 3, 6; San Joaquin RTD: Express 44

Construction
- Parking: 50 short term spaces
- Cycle facilities: Racks and lockers
- Accessible: Yes

Other information
- Status: Unstaffed
- Station code: Amtrak: SKT

History
- Opened: October 27, 1930
- Rebuilt: 2005
- Original company: Southern Pacific

Passengers
- FY 2025: 5,094 (Amtrak only)

Services
Preceding station	Amtrak	Following station
Lodi toward Sacramento	Gold Runner	Modesto toward Bakersfield
Preceding station	Altamont Corridor Express	Following station
Terminus	San Jose – Stockton	Lathrop/Manteca toward San Jose
Former services
Preceding station	Southern Pacific Railroad	Following station
El Pinal toward Sacramento	Sacramento – Lathrop	French Camp toward Lathrop
Terminus	Oakdale Branch	Peters toward Merced
Lodi toward Sacramento	Sacramento Daylight 1946–1970	Lathrop toward Los Angeles
Lodi toward Sacramento	Sacramento Daylight	Tracy Terminus
Future services
Preceding station	Amtrak	Following station
Lodi toward Natomas/Sacramento Airport	Gold Runner	Modesto toward Bakersfield
Preceding station	Altamont Corridor Express	Following station
Lodi toward San Jose	San Jose – Natomas	Lathrop/Manteca toward Natomas
Lodi toward Natomas/Sacramento Airport	Valley Rail	North Lathrop toward Ceres
Lodi toward Natomas/Sacramento Airport	Union City – Natomas Opening 2030	Lathrop/Manteca toward Union City
Location

Robert J. Cabral Station (called Stockton (Cabral / ACE) station by Amtrak), is a railway station in Stockton, California. In 2003, the station building was named in honor of the late Robert J. Cabral, a San Joaquin County supervisor instrumental in the creation of the Altamont Corridor Express (ACE), originally Altamont Commuter Express.

Cabral Station is one of two train stations in Stockton. This station is the terminus for the ACE line to San Jose's Diridon Station and is also served by Amtrak Gold Runner trains between Sacramento and Bakersfield. Gold Runner trains between Oakland and Bakersfield do not pass this station and instead use Stockton – San Joaquin Street station.

== History ==
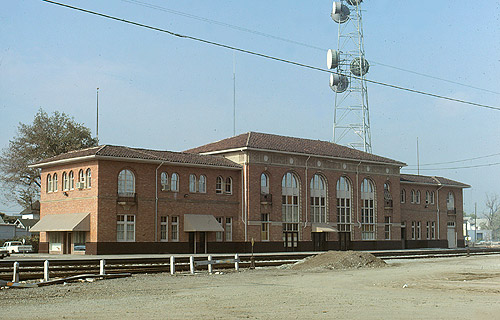
The then-unused station in 1979

The station building was built by the Southern Pacific Railroad in 1930, replacing an earlier Stockton station located a few blocks to the south.

The overall design of the station is based on Italian Renaissance and Spanish Revival prototypes. It follows the classical Palladian five-part plan in which there is a center block connected to two end wings by hyphens. The brick building includes extensive terracotta detailing, such as stylized rope around the large arched windows and a wide frieze that runs around the structure.

Passenger trains to the station were discontinued in 1972. Abandoned in the early 1980s, the depot fell into disrepair.

Altamont Commuter Express service commenced operations with Stockton as its terminus in 1998, and the San Joaquin started service here the following year. In 2001, the San Joaquin Regional Rail Commission (SJRRC), which provides ACE, purchased the old depot for $236,000 (equivalent to $429,111 in 2025 adjusted for inflation). Within a year, plans were drawn up for a full $6.5 million restoration that was completed in 2003. The majority of the funds came through "Measure K," a local voter-approved ½ cent sales tax dedicated to transportation improvement projects.

The station exterior was updated in early 2010 with improvements to the parking lot and landscaping, including added handicapped parking.

When originally constructed, the track closest to the Cabral Station platform was a dead-end tail track. This layout made it impossible for San Joaquins trains to stop at the platform. Instead, passengers loaded from the Weber Road grade crossing. In 2015, the platform track was extended north and tied back into the mainline, allowing Amtrak trains to serve the station platform.

== Connections ==
San Joaquin Regional Transit District (RTD) Express route 44, a bus rapid transit service, stops at the station every 20 to 30 minutes to the Downtown Transit Center and to the Union Transfer Station, major hubs for the RTD bus system. The Downtown Transit Center at 421 E. Weber Avenue is located five blocks (0.5 mi; 0.8 km) west of the station.

Two Amtrak Thruway routes serve this station daily. Route 3 connects passengers to the other station in Stockton, Sacramento, Chico and Redding. Route 6 connects passengers to San Jose and points in between using ACE trains.
