= Turlock station =

Unopened train station

Turlock

General information
- Location: Golden State Blvd. Turlock, California
- Coordinates: 37.505941°N 120.859755°W
- Line: UPRR Fresno Subdivision
- Platforms: 1 island platform
- Tracks: 2
- Connections: Turlock Transit; Greyhound Lines

Construction
- Parking: yes

Other information
- Status: planned

History
- Opening: 2029

Future services
Preceding station	Altamont Corridor Express	Following station
2029
Ceres toward San Jose	San Jose – Merced	Terminus
Ceres toward Natomas/Sacramento Airport	Valley Rail	Terminus
2030
Ceres toward San Jose	San Jose – Merced	Livingston toward Merced
Ceres toward Natomas/Sacramento Airport	Valley Rail	Livingston toward Merced
Ceres toward Union City	Union City – Merced Opening 2030	Livingston toward Merced
Location

Turlock station is a future Altamont Corridor Express station in the city of the same name. It is expected to open to revenue service in 2029 as part of the second phase of ACE's Merced Extension project to Merced. The station would be located at the intersection of Golden State Boulevard and Front Street approximately a mile from downtown. The platform is planned to be connected to the Turlock Transit Roger K. Fall Transit Center via an elevated pedestrian bridge. The station would be across a street or two from the city's Greyhound Lines bus stop.

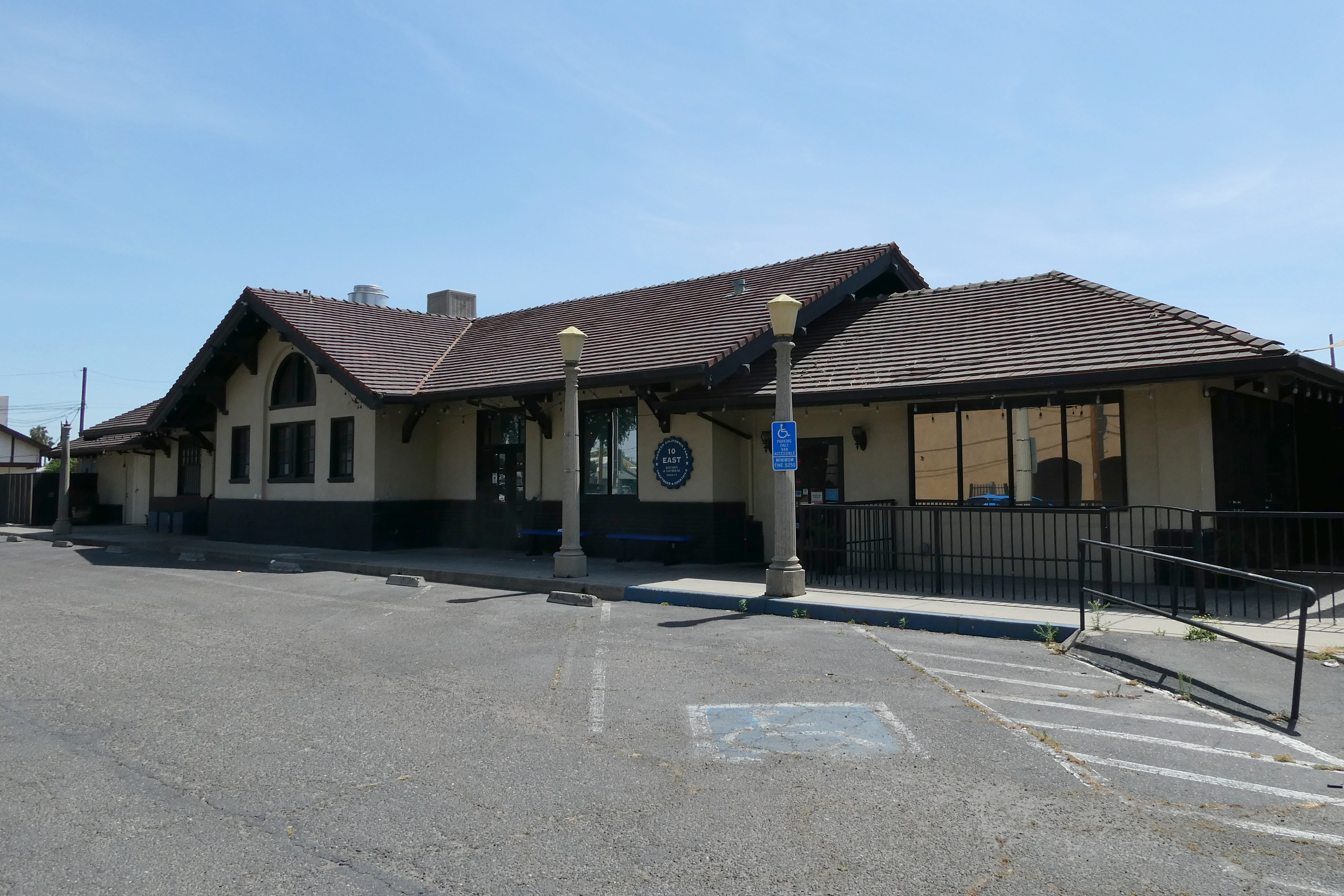
The former Southern Pacific Railroad station in Turlock, about 1.1 miles (1.8 km) away from the planned commuter rail station
