= Elk Grove station =

Proposed train station in California, United States

Elk Grove

General information
- Location: 3134 Dwight Road; Elk Grove, California
- Coordinates: 38.426°N 121.458°W
- Line: UP Sacramento Subdivision

Other information
- Status: construction planning / area clearance

History
- Opening: 2027

Future service
Preceding station	Amtrak	Following station
Midtown Sacramento toward Natomas/Sacramento Airport	Gold Runner	Lodi toward Bakersfield or Oakland
Preceding station	Altamont Corridor Express	Following station
Midtown Sacramento toward Natomas/Sacramento Airport	San Jose – Natomas	Lodi toward San Jose
Midtown Sacramento toward Natomas/Sacramento Airport	Valley Rail	Lodi toward Ceres
Phase 2 (2029)
Preceding station	Amtrak	Following station
City College toward Natomas/Sacramento Airport	Gold Runner	Lodi toward Bakersfield or Oakland
Preceding station	Altamont Corridor Express	Following station
City College toward Natomas/Sacramento Airport	San Jose – Natomas	Lodi toward San Jose
City College toward Natomas/Sacramento Airport	Valley Rail	Lodi toward Ceres
City College toward Natomas/Sacramento Airport	Union City – Natomas Opening 2030	Lodi toward Union City
Location
- Location within California Location within the United States

Elk Grove station is a planned train station in Elk Grove, California to be located north of Laguna Boulevard at 3134 Dwight Road. It is part of the Valley Rail Sacramento Extension Project between Stockton and Sacramento. It will be served by Amtrak California Gold Runner and Altamont Corridor Express trains.

An earlier proposal for a North Elk Grove station was rejected after the Sacramento Regional Sanitation District (owners of the property) objected to its construction. The station is expected to open with the commencement of ACE service to Natomas in 2026. In February 2024, Mayor Bobbie Singh-Allen announced that the City of Elk Grove had closed escrow on the station property. At the same time, it was announced that the city was going through the design phase for the station.

Amtrak Thruway buses currently stop curbside at 9180 Harbour Point Drive.
