= Midtown Sacramento station =

Planned train station in California, US

Midtown Sacramento, CA

General information
- Location: Q Street; Sacramento, California
- Coordinates: 38.569093°N 121.483836°W
- Line: UP Sacramento Subdivision
- Platforms: 1 side platform
- Tracks: 3

Construction
- Accessible: Yes

History
- Opening: 2031

Future services
Preceding station	Amtrak	Following station
Natomas/Sacramento Airport Terminus	Gold Runner	Elk Grove toward Bakersfield
Preceding station	Altamont Corridor Express	Following station
Natomas/Sacramento Airport Terminus	Valley Rail	Elk Grove toward Ceres
Second phase
Preceding station	Amtrak	Following station
Old North Sacramento toward Natomas/Sacramento Airport	Gold Runner	City College toward Bakersfield
Preceding station	Altamont Corridor Express	Following station
Old North Sacramento toward Natomas/Sacramento Airport	Valley Rail	City College toward Ceres
Old North Sacramento toward Natomas/Sacramento Airport	Union City – Natomas Opening 2030	City College toward Union City
Location
- Location within Sacramento, California Location within California Location within the United States

Midtown Sacramento station is a planned train station in the neighborhood of the same name that will be a stop on Altamont Corridor Express and Amtrak California's Gold Runner services. To be constructed as part of the Valley Rail project, it was expected to open no later than 2023. By 2023, the opening date had slipped to 2026. Construction timelines were approved in 2026, with an expected opening date in 2031. The platform will run between P Street and the wye at S Street and be bisected by Q Street. SacRT light rail stations are located either three blocks to the east or west.

== History ==
The original California Zephyr ran on this alignment until 1970, hailing at the Western Pacific Passenger Depot at J Street.
