= Modesto Transportation Center =

Bus terminal and former train station located in downtown Modesto, California

Modesto
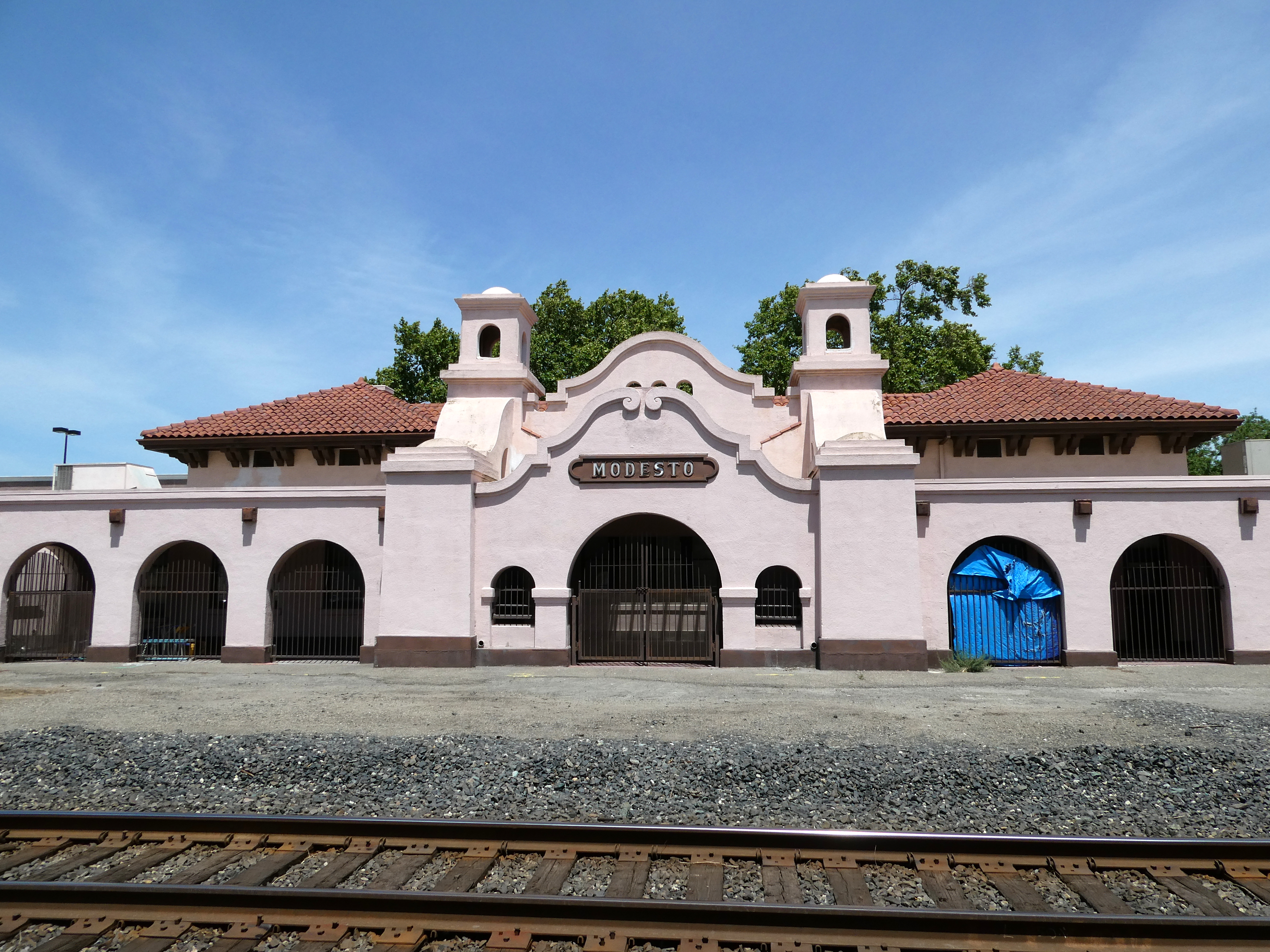
- Modesto Transportation Center in May 2022

General information
- Location: 9th Street at J Street, Modesto, California
- Coordinates: 37°38′22″N 121°0′6.5″W
- Owner: City of Modesto
- Line: UPRR Fresno Subdivision
- Platforms: 1 (planned)
- Tracks: 2 (planned)
- Connections: Stanislaus Regional Transit Authority; Greyhound Lines

Construction
- Architectural style: Mission Revival

Other information
- Status: Bus station operating New rail service planned

History
- Opened: November 8, 1870
- Closed: May 1, 1971 (Southern Pacific)
- Rebuilt: 1915; 1993; 2027 (ACE)

Future services
Preceding station	Altamont Corridor Express	Following station
Ripon toward San Jose	San Jose – Ceres	Ceres Terminus
Ripon toward Natomas/Sacramento Airport	Valley Rail	Ceres Terminus
Former services
Preceding station	Southern Pacific Railroad	Following station
Ceres toward Oakland Pier	San Joaquin Valley Line	Saiida toward Los Angeles
Lathrop toward Sacramento	Sacramento Daylight	Turlock toward Los Angeles
Lathrop toward Oakland Pier	San Joaquin Daylight	Turlock toward Los Angeles
Location

The Modesto Transportation Center is a bus terminal and former train station located in downtown Modesto, California.

== History ==
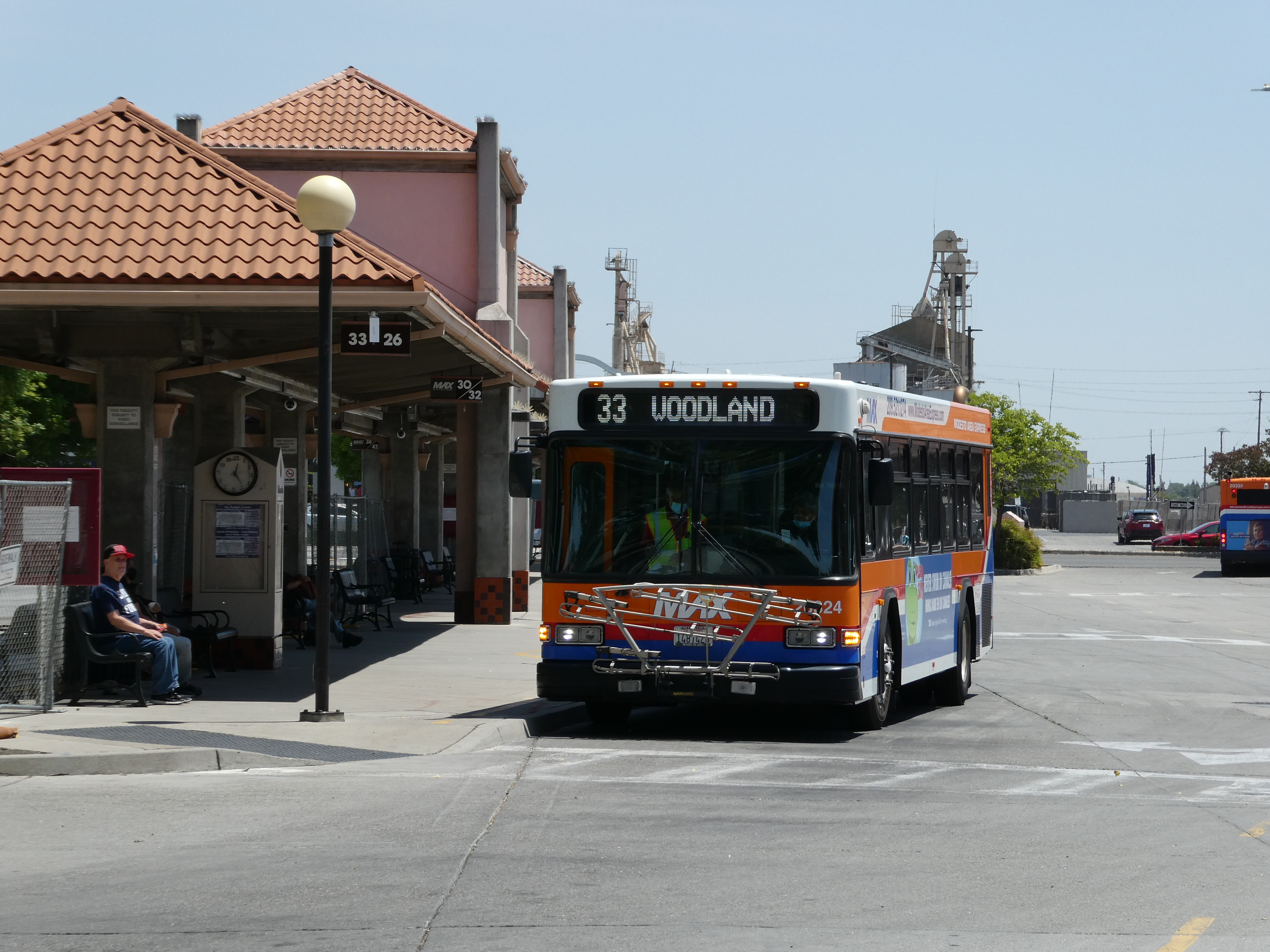
StanRTA bus at Modesto in 2022

The Central Pacific Railroad was built to Modesto with service beginning on November 8, 1870. The railroad taken over by the Southern Pacific Railroad in 1884, who built a new Mission Revival-style station in 1915. It was used until 1971, when Amtrak took over intercity passenger service.

When Amtrak restored service to Modesto with the San Joaquin in 1974, the former Santa Fe station in Riverbank was used instead. (It was replaced with the modern Modesto station in 1999.) The depot was restored in 1993 as a bus terminal.

Rail service is expected to be restored in 2026 as part of the Altamont Corridor Express Merced Extension project to Merced via Ceres. The station building is undergoing renovations to expand the passenger waiting area at a cost of $5.23 million.
