= Old North Sacramento station =

ACE and San Joaquins stop north of the American River

Old North Sacramento, CA

General information
- Location: El Monte Ave. Sacramento, California
- Coordinates: 38.603962°N 121.468586°W
- Line: UP Sacramento Subdivision
- Platforms: 1 island platform
- Tracks: 2

Construction
- Accessible: Yes

History
- Opening: 2029

Future Service
Preceding station	Amtrak	Following station
Natomas/Sacramento Airport Terminus	Gold Runner	Midtown Sacramento toward Oakland or Bakersfield
Preceding station	Altamont Corridor Express	Following station
Natomas/Sacramento Airport Terminus	San Jose – Natomas	Midtown Sacramento toward San Jose or Merced
Natomas/Sacramento Airport Terminus	Union City – Natomas Opening 2030	Midtown Sacramento toward Union City
Location
- Location within Sacramento, California Location within California Location within the United States

Old North Sacramento is a planned train station that will be a stop on Altamont Corridor Express and Amtrak California's Gold Runner services. The station is located near the intersection of El Monte Avenue and Acoma Street. To be constructed as part of the Valley Rail project, it is expected to open by 2029. The SacRT light rail Globe station is located nearby to the east.
