= City College station (Sacramento) =

Light rail station in Sacramento, California, US

City College
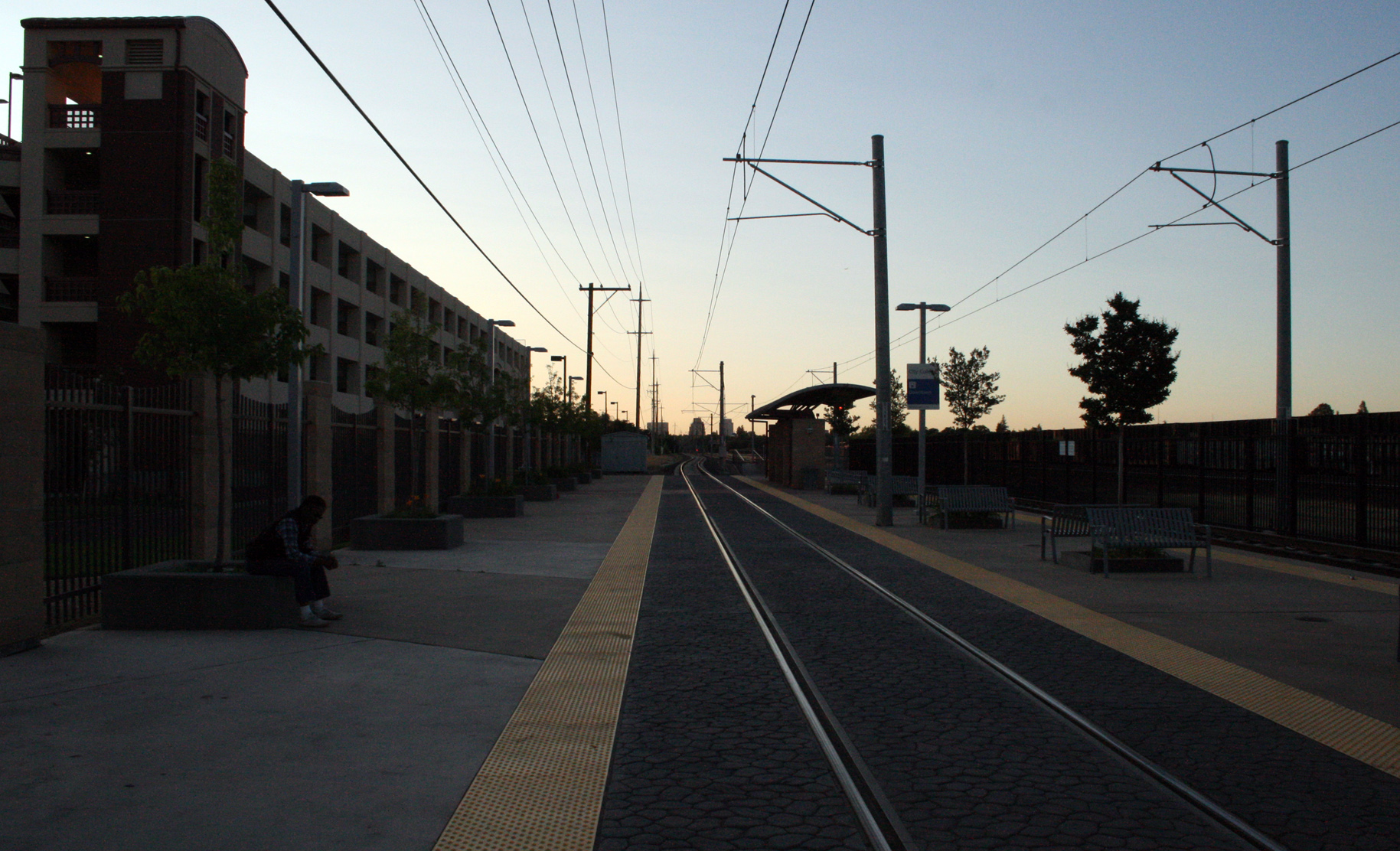
- City College station platforms, September 2007

General information
- Location: 24th Street; Sacramento, California; United States
- Coordinates: 38°32′30.69″N 121°29′7.22″W
- Owner: Sacramento Regional Transit District
- Lines: UP Sacramento Subdivision; Blue Line Southwest Extension
- Platforms: 1 side platform, 1 island platform
- Tracks: 2
- Connections: Sacramento Regional Transit: 11, SmaRT Ride Franklin−South Sacramento

Construction
- Structure type: At-grade
- Accessible: Yes

History
- Opened: September 26, 2003

Services
Preceding station	SacRT	Following station
4th Avenue/Wayne Hultgren toward Watt/I-80	Blue Line	Fruitridge toward Cosumnes River College
Future services
Preceding station	Altamont Corridor Express	Following station
Midtown Sacramento toward Natomas/Sacramento Airport	San Jose – Natomas	Elk Grove toward San Jose
Midtown Sacramento toward Natomas/Sacramento Airport	Union City – Natomas Opening 2030	Elk Grove toward Union City
Preceding station	Amtrak	Following station
Midtown Sacramento toward Natomas/Sacramento Airport	Gold Runner	Elk Grove toward Bakersfield
Location

City College station is an at-grade light rail station on the Blue Line of the SacRT light rail system operated by the Sacramento Regional Transit District. The station is located in an exclusive right of way alongside the Union Pacific Railroad's Sacramento Subdivision and a small rail yard, on the campus of Sacramento City College, after which the station is named, in the city of Sacramento, California.

== Location ==
The station is located northeast of Charles C. Hughes Stadium on campus. In addition to serving the college this station also serves William Land Park and Curtis Park. The 60-foot-wide (18 m) station provides bus service, drop-off areas, and walkways to the stadium, campus, and parking lots.

The land east of the station has been the site of transit-oriented development community named Crocker Village. The remediated brownfield land was formerly part of a larger Union Pacific rail yard. Early construction includes a bridge over the light rail platform and the remaining rail yard, along with a 91-unit senior housing development called Curtis Park Court.

== Platforms and tracks ==
Like nearly all stations built as part of the Blue Line Southwest Extension, City College station has a rather unique layout with an island platform serving northbound trains and a side platform boarding area for southbound trains, integrated into a plaza that leads into the Sacramento City College station. The southbound tracks are embedded in the pavement, allowing passengers to cross to the northbound platform from any point in the plaza. The layout is both efficient and a cost-effective way of providing a pedestrian-train interface.

== Future ==
Altamont Corridor Express and Gold Runner services are planned to stop at the station when those lines are extended to Sacramento as part of the Valley Rail project. A new platform will be constructed along the main line to facilitate the commuter rail and inter-city trains. By 2023, the expected start of the new service was 2029.
