= Ripon station =

Planned railway station in California, US

Ripon

General information
- Location: South Industrial Ave. Ripon, California
- Coordinates: 37.738743°N 121.121132°W
- Line: UPRR Fresno Subdivision
- Platforms: 1 side platform
- Tracks: 2

Construction
- Accessible: Yes

Other information
- Status: planned

History
- Opening: 2027

Future services
Preceding station	Altamont Corridor Express	Following station
Manteca toward San Jose	San Jose – Ceres	Modesto toward Ceres
Manteca toward Natomas/Sacramento Airport	Valley Rail	Modesto toward Ceres
Location

Ripon is a future Altamont Corridor Express station in the city of the same name. The platform will be located between the railway right of way and California State Route 99, south of the Main Street interchange. Access to the platform will be via a pedestrian overcrossing southwest over the tracks to South Industrial Avenue. It was expected to open to revenue service in 2024 as a station along the first phase of ACE's Merced Extension project to Merced, but was later delayed to 2027.
