= Livingston station (Altamont Corridor Express) =

Railway station in Merced County, California

Livingston

General information
- Location: Main Street; Livingston, California
- Coordinates: 37.387°N 120.7224°W
- Line: UPRR Fresno Subdivision
- Platforms: 1 island platform
- Tracks: 2

Other information
- Status: planned

History
- Opening: 2030

Future services
| Preceding station | Altamont Corridor Express | Following station |
|---|---|---|
| Turlock toward San Jose | San Jose – Merced | Merced Terminus |
| Turlock toward Natomas/Sacramento Airport | Valley Rail | Merced Terminus |
| Turlock toward Union City | Union City – Merced Opening 2030 | Merced Terminus |
Location

Livingston station is a future Altamont Corridor Express station in Livingston, California. It is expected to open to revenue service in 2030 as part of the second phase of ACE's Merced Extension project to Merced. The station is located on Main Street. Turlock was selected over Atwater as a stop due to the distance between adjacent stations potentially resulting in fewer bottlenecks for freight trains.
