= Valley Link =

Proposed hybrid rail line in northern California, US

Overview
- Status: In planning
- Owner: Tri-Valley – San Joaquin Valley Regional Rail Authority
- Locale: Tri-Valley/Northern San Joaquin Valley
- Termini: Dublin/Pleasanton station; Mountain House Community station
- Stations: 4
- Website: https://www.valleylinkrail.com/

Service
- Type: Hybrid rail
- Operator(s): San Joaquin Regional Rail Commission
- Depot(s): Mountain House Operations and Maintenance Facility
- Rolling stock: Battery electric multiple units

Technical
- Line length: 26 mi (42 km)
- Track gauge: 1,435 mm (4 ft 8 1/2 in) standard gauge

Valley Link is a proposed 26-mile-long (42 km) hybrid rail line in Northern California, which seeks to connect the rapid transit Bay Area Rapid Transit (BART) system in the San Francisco Bay Area with the northern San Joaquin Valley via the Tri-Valley region. Since 1997, BART's Blue Line's eastern terminus is at Dublin/Pleasanton station on the border of Dublin and Pleasanton. Valley Link seeks to extend rail service east from here into the northern San Joaquin Valley over Altamont Pass, which would help alleviate traffic congestion and reduce greenhouse gas emissions on Interstate 580 (I-580). The project resulted from various failed proposals to extend the Blue Line east to Livermore.

The line would run within the median of Interstate 580 (I-580), right-of-way of the first transcontinental railroad owned by Alameda County, and new right-of-way in San Joaquin County. It is being planned by the Tri-Valley – San Joaquin Valley Regional Rail Authority, a special-purpose district body formed for the sole purpose of its planning. Valley Link is ultimately planned to run between Dublin/Pleasanton station and the Altamont Corridor Express’s (ACE) future North Lathrop station utilizing standard-gauge zero-emission trainsets. The initial operating phase is proposed to be the line between Dublin/Pleasanton station and Vasco Road, with the segments to Mountain House Community station and North Lathrop in the San Joaquin Valley being reserved for future planning. This segment is as of June 2025 in planning, with construction to begin as early as 2028.

== History ==
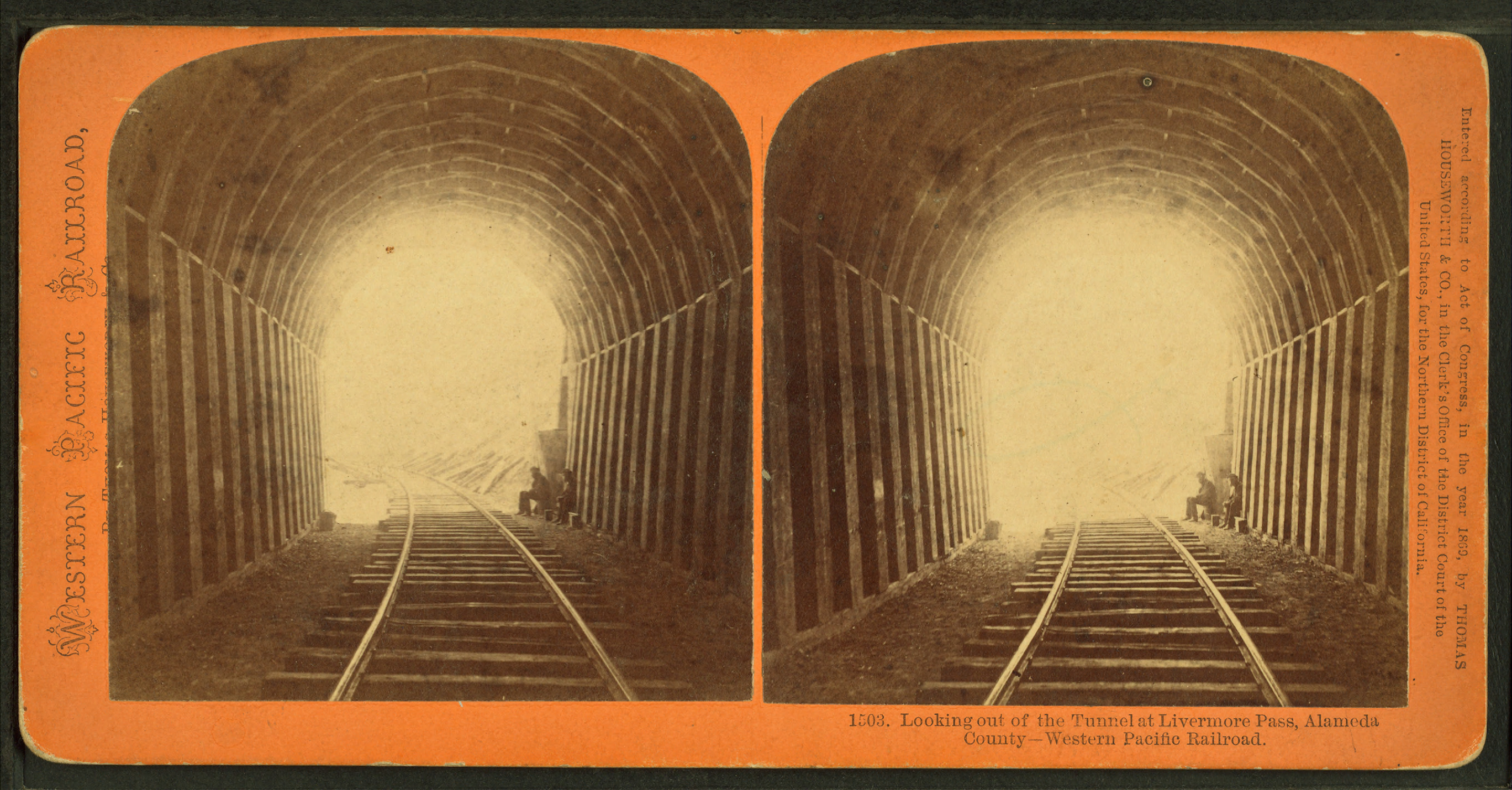
Stereoscopic image of the Western Pacific Railroad summit tunnel at Altamont Pass, c. 1869

About 12 miles (19 km) of the first transcontinental railroad right of way through the Tri-Valley and Altamont Pass, originally established in 1869 by the old Western Pacific Railroad, was deeded to Alameda County by Southern Pacific Railroad in 1984. This historic 1869 route featured a Summit Tunnel, 1,200 feet (370 m) long, blasted and dug by Chinese laborers. The Altamont Commuter Express commuter rail service, which began between Stockton and San Jose in 1998, uses the other Union Pacific right of way that goes over Altamont Pass, established in 1908.

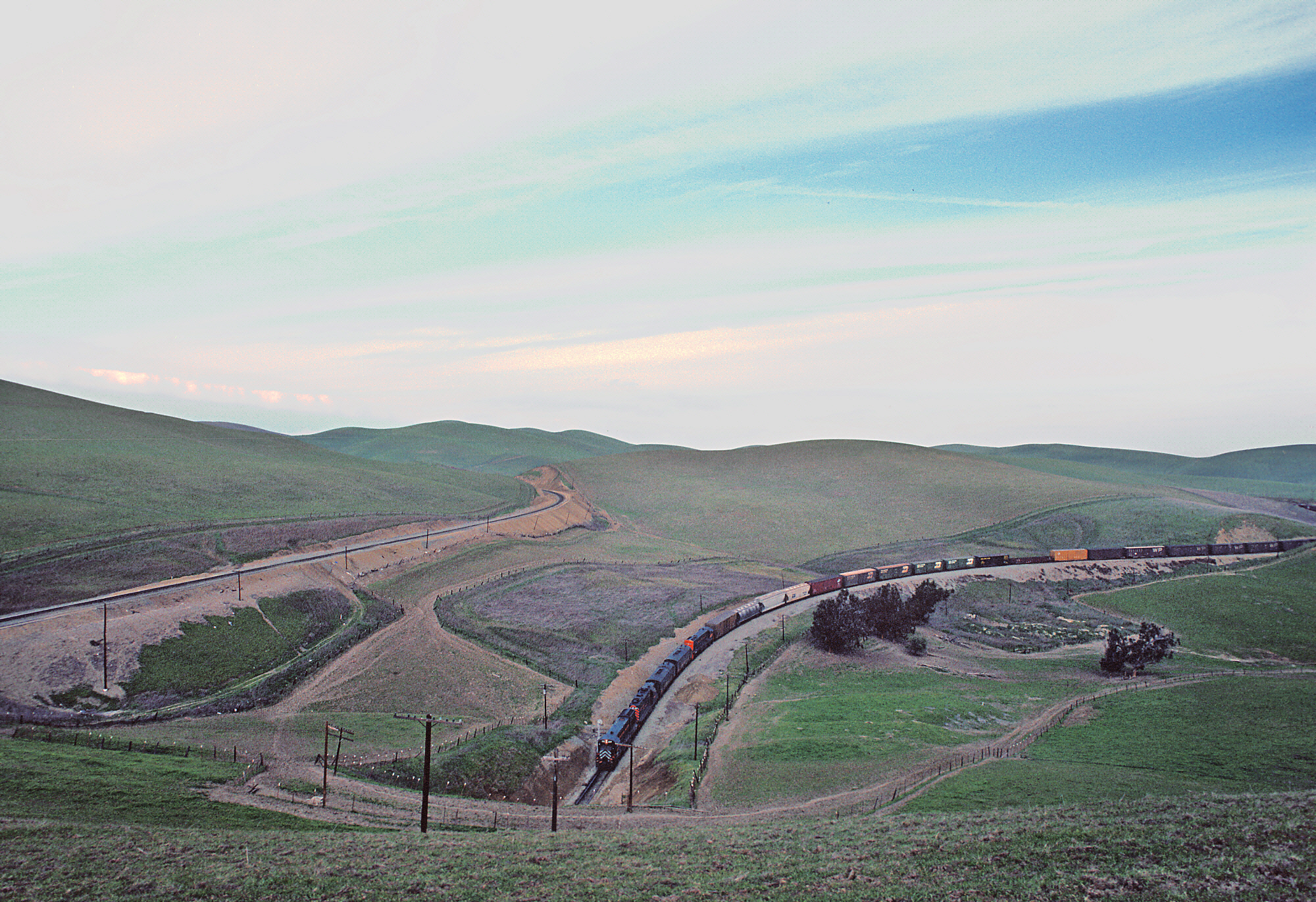
The Western Pacific Railroad right of way (center and right) through the Altamont Pass, which Alameda County acquired in 1984. The route of the Altamont Corridor Express is the track higher in elevation on the left.

A similar plan to run diesel multiple unit trains across Altamont Pass was proposed by BART in 2003, though it comprised a larger service area (continuing north along the Iron Horse Regional Trail, a former Southern Pacific right-of-way).

In 2017, citing lack of interest from the Bay Area Rapid Transit District in bringing BART service directly to Livermore, the Livermore City Council proposed a newly established local entity to undertake planning and construction of the extension, which was also recommended by the California State Assembly Transportation Committee. Assembly Bill 758 was signed by Governor of California Jerry Brown on October 13, 2017, formally establishing the Authority.

On May 24, 2018, the BART board voted against a full rapid transit BART build or a bus rapid transit system to extend service east from Dublin/Pleasanton station. This prompted the new Rail Authority to initiate planning of a new transit system.

A final feasibility report was released in October 2019. The buildout cost to North Lathrop was estimated at between $1.88 billion and $3.21 billion, with an expected start of operations between the second quarter of 2027 and the fourth quarter of 2028. Scott Haggerty, one of the founders of the TVSJVRRA, noted that the popularity of the project was reflected in the volume of public comments to the feasibility report. A draft environmental impact report was released in December 2020. The final environmental impact report was approved by the board in May 2021, allowing the rail authority to proceed with design and continue seeking funding for the project.

By 2023, the locally preferred alternative had the line utilizing the I-580 median and Western Pacific alignment until realigning with I-580 north of the Summit Tunnel and continuing east to Mountain House. Selection of the alternate Mountain House station location and alignment east of Altamont Pass forced the agency to redo part of the EIR. By 2024, service was proposed to start in 2035.

Cost estimates for the first phase of construction had reached $4.4 billion by 2025, more than double from a few years earlier. The board voted that June to truncate the first phase of construction to the segment between Dublin/Pleasanton and Vasco Road. Construction could start as soon as 2028.

== Rail service ==
Valley Link is a plan to utilize zero-emission trains along the former first transcontinental railroad right-of-way through the Altamont Pass and in the Interstate 580 median through the city of Livermore. Trains would initially run 26 miles (42 km) from the Dublin/Pleasanton station to Mountain House Community station, with intermediate stations at Isabel and Southfront Road. Weekday service would connect to every other BART train at Dublin/Pleasanton.

The developer of River Islands has offered to cover the cost of station construction in exchange for the ability to build a transit village at the site.

The San Joaquin Regional Rail Commission agreed to operate the service in 2020.

=== Funding ===
Funds previously allocated to BART to construct a Livermore extension were forfeited to this authority by July 1, 2018, amounting to at least $145 million. Funding for the feasibility study was provided variously by Caltrans, Metropolitan Transportation Commission, and the San Joaquin County Council of Governments. By February 2019, more than $588 million had been accumulated for the project. In 2020, the project gained a further $400 million from reallocated BART funds. In 2023, the state of California awarded the project $25 million.

=== Stations ===
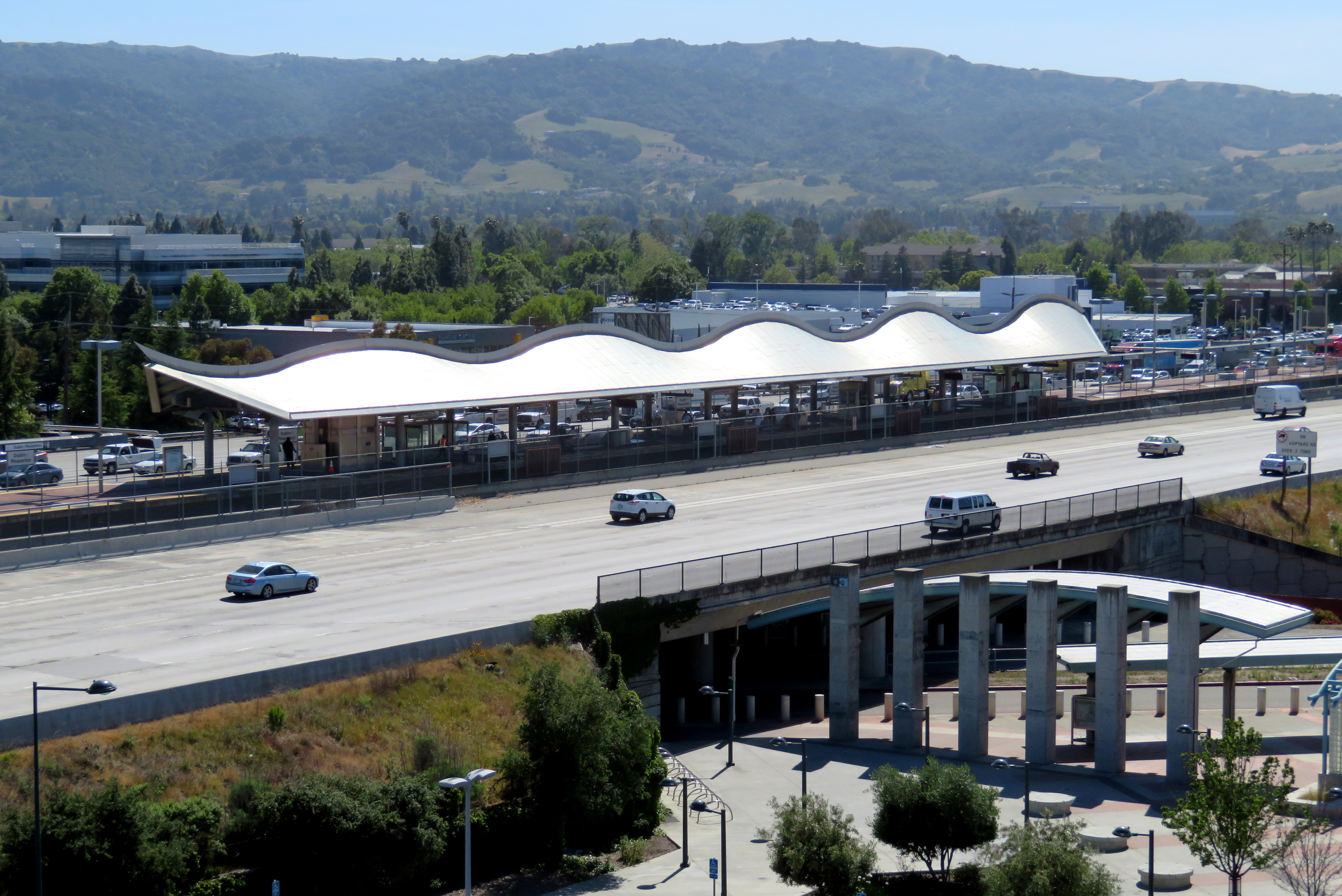
Trains will terminate at Dublin/Pleasanton station, seen here in 2017, and connect to Bay Area Rapid Transit trains.

The following are initial planned stations along the route:

Station	Location	Connections
Mountain House Community	Tracy	
Southfront Road	Livermore	
Vasco Road	Livermore	Altamont Corridor Express; WHEELS
Isabel	Livermore	
Dublin/Pleasanton	Dublin/Pleasanton	BART: Blue Line; Amtrak Thruway, County Connection, RTD, StanRTA, WHEELS

== Rolling stock ==
In 2018, Stadler met with the governing board to discuss traction sources; diesel multiple unit or diesel/battery electric hybrid vehicles were envisioned to serve the route. AECOM was contracted to perform a feasibility study for the project that same year. The loading gauge of highway underpasses limits the selection of rolling stock.

Hydrogen trains were initially selected as the line's rolling stock. With an increase in the price of hydrogen, plans changed in 2025 to utilize battery electric multiple units.

Further phases are planned to extend the line north to Lathrop and Stockton. Infill stations at Ellis and Grant Line Road may be added in the future.
