= Fruitridge station =

Light rail station in Sacramento, California

Fruitridge
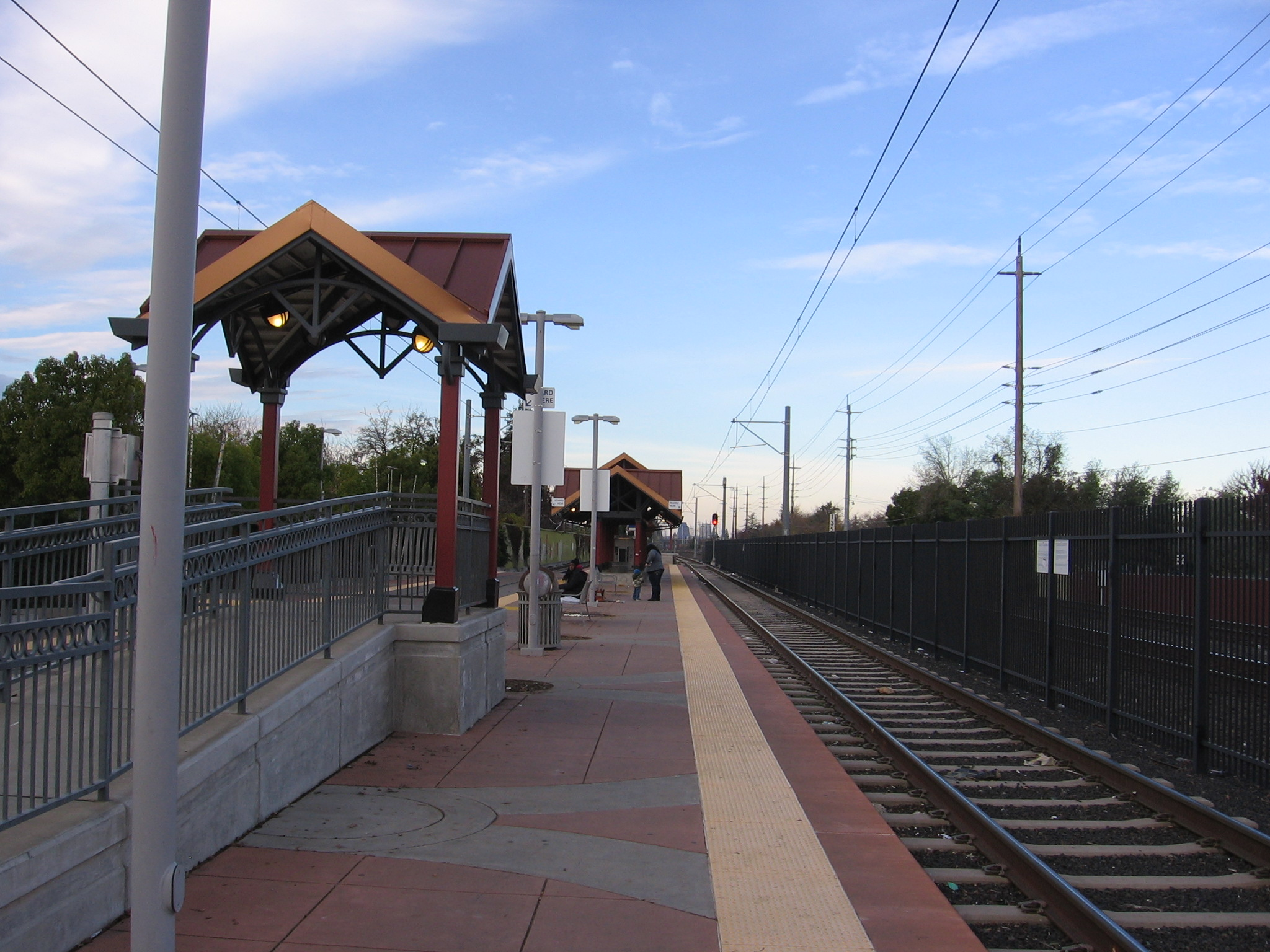
- Fruitridge station platform

General information
- Location: Fruitridge Road at 28th Avenue; Sacramento, California; United States
- Coordinates: 38°31′32.18″N 121°28′48.41″W
- Owner: Sacramento Regional Transit District
- Platforms: 1 side platform, 1 island platform
- Tracks: 2
- Connections: Sacramento Regional Transit: 61, SmaRT Ride Franklin−South Sacramento

Construction
- Structure type: At-grade
- Cycle facilities: Racks
- Accessible: Yes

History
- Opened: September 26, 2003

Services
Preceding station	SacRT	Following station
City College toward Watt/I-80	Blue Line	47th Avenue toward Cosumnes River College
Location

Fruitridge station is an at-grade light rail station on the Blue Line of the SacRT light rail system operated by the Sacramento Regional Transit District. The station is located in an exclusive right of way alongside the Union Pacific Railroad's Sacramento Subdivision at its intersection with Fruitridge Road, after which the station is named, in the city of Sacramento, California. The station serves the commercial areas along Fruitridge Road and the residential neighborhoods of Hollywood Park and South City Farms.

== Platforms and tracks ==
Fruitridge station has a slightly different design compared to other stations built as part of the Blue Line Southwest Extension. Passengers use an island platform to board trains, but the station also has a small side platform integrated into a plaza on the west side of the station that also contains the westbound bus stop and a crosswalk to the eastbound bus stop. The southbound tracks are embedded in the pavement, allowing passengers to cross to the island platform from any point in the plaza. The layout is both efficient and a cost-effective way of providing a pedestrian-train-bus interface.
