= South County Transit =

- Parent: Sacramento County and the CIty of Galt
- Locale: Galt, CA
- Routes: 3
- Hubs: Galt City Hall, Lodi Transit Station
- Operator: Storer Transit Systems
- Website: http://www.sctlink.com/

South County Transit (SCT Link) provides transit service in the city of Galt, CA. The service includes 3 fixed route lines in addition to a Dial-A-Ride service. Fixed route service operates Weekdays only and Dial-A-Ride operates Monday thru Saturday. Services connect to SacRT in Downtown Sacramento, Rio Vista Delta Breeze in Isleton, E-tran in Elk Grove and the Grape Line and San Joaquin RTD in Lodi.

== Routes ==
Route	Destinations	Service Hours	Schedule
Hwy 99 Express	Lodi Transit Station, Galt City Hall, Elk Grove, and South Sacramento	M-F 5:20a-7:20p	Current Schedule
Sacramento Commuter Express	Downtown Sacramento, Galt City Hall	M-F 6:25a-6:35p	Current Schedule
Delta Route	Galt City Hall, Isleton City Hall	M-F 6:20a-7:10p	Current Schedule
