= Lathrop/Manteca station =

Train station in southern Lathrop, California

Lathrop–Manteca

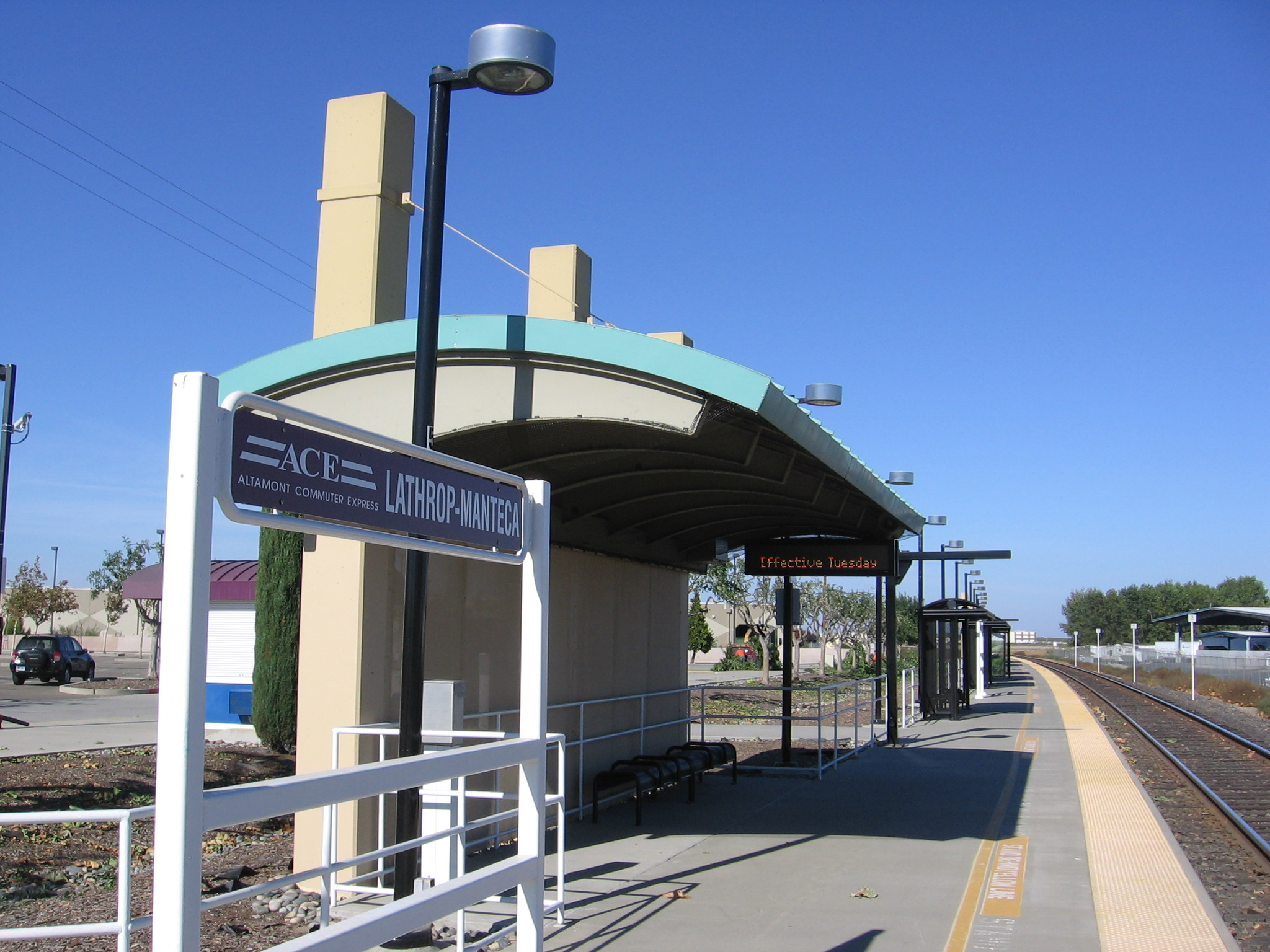
- Lathrop/Manteca station in October 2012

General information
- Location: 17800 Shideler Parkway; Lathrop, California
- Coordinates: 37°47′55.49″N 121°15′48.12″W
- Line: UP Oakland Subdivision
- Platforms: 1 side platform
- Tracks: 1
- Connections: StanRTA; Amtrak Thruway

Construction
- Parking: 510 spaces
- Cycle facilities: Lockers
- Accessible: Yes

Other information
- Station code: Amtrak: LTM

History
- Opened: October 19, 1998

Services
Preceding station	Altamont Corridor Express	Following station
Tracy toward San Jose	San Jose – Stockton	Stockton Terminus
Future service
Preceding station	Altamont Corridor Express	Following station
Tracy toward San Jose	San Jose – Ceres	Manteca toward Ceres
Location

Lathrop/Manteca station is a train station in southern Lathrop, California, served by Altamont Corridor Express (ACE) service. The station is located on rail tracks and a rail yard that is on land that was once a turkey farm. It is three miles (4.8 km) from Lathrop and one and a half miles (2.4 km) from Manteca to the east, a location chosen to draw commuters from both cities.

The station was studied to be relocated further south as part of the ACEforward project, but this concept was eliminated from consideration.
