= Manteca Transit =

The logo.

Manteca Transit is a public transit agency in the California city of Manteca. It operates routes from the Manteca Transit Center, where it is based. The agency offers four local fixed routes connecting local shopping and job centers with neighborhoods in addition to dial-a-ride service. Regional service is provided by San Joaquin RTD.

Buses are all capable of taking passengers in wheelchairs; there are also bike racks.
