= Stockton Diamond =

Major railroad junction in California

Coordinates: 37.946756°N 121.275872°W

The Stockton Diamond is a railway junction just south of downtown Stockton, California, near the intersection of Aurora Street South and East Scotts Avenue. It is the junction where the north–south running Union Pacific Fresno Subdivision line crosses the east–west BNSF Stockton Subdivision, both double-track railways. Freight trains operate through the intersection 24 hours a day; Altamont Corridor Express and Amtrak California Gold Runner passenger trains also utilize the junction. Two of the sides of the "diamond" are complete and allow interchanges between the north-east and south-west legs.

== Grade separation ==
By 2020 the junction was the most congested in California, with the level-crossing design contributing to delays throughout the state's rail network. As part of the Valley Rail project, the San Joaquin Regional Rail Commission (SJRRC) and the California Department of Transportation (Caltrans) will grade separate the intersection, which will add capacity for future passenger rail expansion and reduce crossing interference. The Union Pacific line will be elevated above the BNSF line; construction is scheduled to start in 2023 and planned to complete in May 2026.

The north–south flyover tracks will be constructed approximately 200 ft (61 m) to the east of the existing UP Fresno Subdivision, from the UP Stockton Yard to the at-grade crossing at Weber Avenue. Tracks will begin to rise at Lafayette Street and return to grade after Charter Way; a large retaining wall will be constructed between Charter and Church. Road traffic on Charter, Hazelton, and Scotts will be grade-separated under new rail bridges, while the existing at-grade crossings at Church and Lafayette would be closed. When complete, the project also will finish all four sides of the diamond.

== See also ==
- Colton Crossing
