= River Islands at Lathrop =

Planned community on the San Joaquin River

Coordinates: 37.7902°N 121.3119°W

River Islands at Lathrop is a planned community on a 4,800-acre (7.5 sq mi; 1,900 ha) site in the Sacramento-San Joaquin River Delta in Lathrop, California, United States. As of 2024, approximately 3,500 homes of the Second-phase of 4,284 houses had been built.

== Plan ==
The developer is the Cambay Group of Walnut Creek, California which is an American subsidiary of Somerston Holdings Limited of the United Kingdom. Plans call for the completion of 15,000 homes, a town center, business parks, and recreational areas over a 25-year development period.

In October 2011, Banta Elementary School District approved the purchase of a 30-acre site (12 ha) within River Islands in Lathrop for construction of a k-8 charter school. The 450-student technology school was proposed to open in August 2013 with an eventual expansion for a high school and college.

In 2018, the Tri-Valley–San Joaquin Valley Regional Rail Authority indicated its plan to run trains to River Islands as the Valley Link service's initial terminus.

== History ==
The project was initially proposed in 1996 as a "mega resort" called Gold Rush City with theme parks, golf courses and private homes. After substantial criticism about building within a flood plain, the plan was changed to a planned community surrounded by wide levees. these levees go by "Super levees", the district protecting part of Manteca, Lathrop east of the San Joaquín River, French Camp, and Stockton's Weston Ranch neighborhood is working toward a $270 million solution to upgrade to 200-year protection level as early as 2030. Since being proposed in 2001, the development has been delayed several years due to lawsuits, concerns about flooding, environmental impact issues and a downturn in the housing market. To address the issues of flooding, plans call for 18 miles (29 km) of 300-foot-wide (91 m) levees to surround the community. In 2003, Cambay Group settled lawsuits by the Sierra Club by establishing an $8.2 million trust for the protection of local farmland. In 2009, the development company stated that construction would be further delayed because of the downturn in the housing market.
