= North Valley Rail =

Proposed railway service in California

North Valley Rail is a proposed railway service in California that would offer trips from Natomas to Chico. Plans include extending Amtrak Gold Runner and Altamont Corridor Express services along the Union Pacific Sacramento Subdivision and Valley Subdivision. The project was initiated by the Butte County Association of Governments. Initial estimates place the cost of the project at $530 million, with 600,000 passengers yearly and a start date of July 2031.

Initial studies ruled out Oroville as a potential terminus of the line, leaving a Chico station as the preferred alternative. Stations are planned in Natomas, Plumas Lake, Marysville, Gridley (with a bus connection to Oroville), and Chico. Future plans include a connection to the Capitol Corridor in Sacramento. Capitol Corridor and North Valley Rail cross in Sacramento — North Valley Rail is primarily aligned to the north and south, while Capitol Corridor is largely aligned east and west.
