= Stanislaus Regional Transit Authority =

Transportation in California, United States

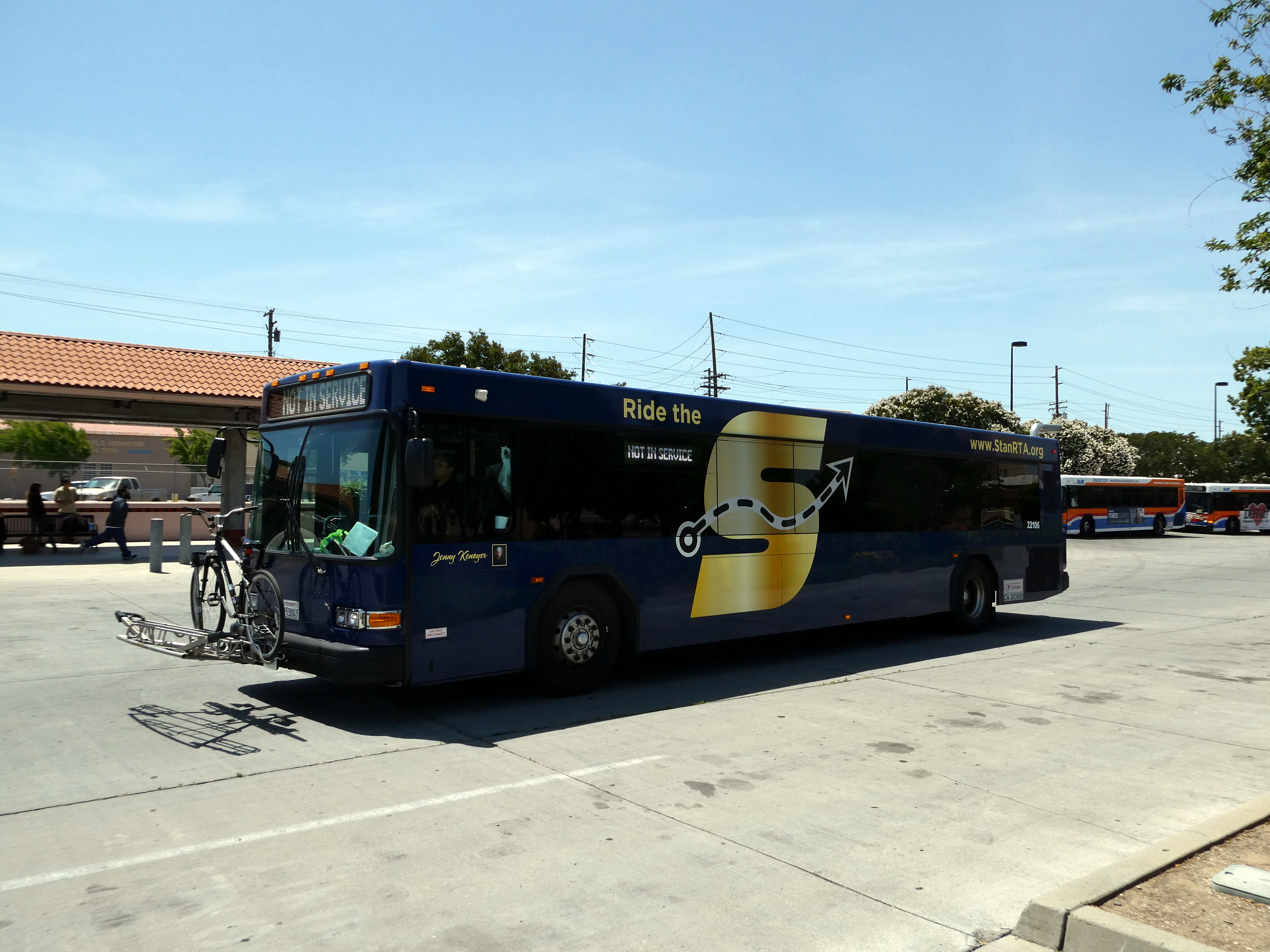
- StanRTA bus at Modesto Transportation Center in May 2022
- Founded: 2021
- Defunct: City Transit (1927–1932), Modesto Motor Bus Service (1932–1973), Intracity Transit (1973–1990), Modesto Area Express (1990–2021), Stanislaus Regional Transit
- Headquarters: 1001 9th Street
- Locale: Modesto, California
- Service area: Modesto and Stanislaus County, California
- Service type: Bus service, Dial-a-Ride
- Routes: 30
- Hubs: Modesto Transportation Center, Vintage Faire Mall
- Fleet: MCI, Gillig, Proterra
- Operator: Transdev North America
- Transit Manager: Adam Barth
- Website: Official website

The Stanislaus Regional Transit Authority, branded as The S, is a public transportation bus system serving Modesto, California and surrounding Stanislaus County. It was formed in 2021 from the merger of the Modesto Area Express (MAX) and Stanislaus Regional Transit (StaRT) systems. Most routes connect at the downtown Modesto Transportation Center; the Vintage Faire Mall serves as a secondary hub.

== History ==
=== Modesto intracity service ===
Originally, passengers in Modesto were served by streetcars over the short-line Modesto Interurban Railway from 1911 to 1917, operated intermittently first by the Tidewater Southern Railway; the Modesto and Empire Traction Company was founded on October 7, 1911, and began regularly scheduled passenger service between Modesto and Empire on November 1 of that year. Passenger service was discontinued in 1917 after freight became more important.

Public bus transportation service in Modesto started on September 19, 1927, when the City Transit Company (CTC), a private venture, began operations under a city franchise. CTC ran a single bus on a 30-minute schedule, but soon added two more buses to expand service throughout Modesto.

City Transit told the City Council they would renew its liability insurance in June 1932 as a condition to keep the franchise; however, struggling with profitability, the franchise was transferred to a new owner three months later in September 1932. The privately owned Modesto Motor Bus Service (MBS) took over and ran transit operations in Modesto through 1973, serving a peak of one million riders in 1945 due to wartime shortages of gasoline and automobiles. The 1955 map of four routes resembled a cloverleaf in shape; that year, MBS petitioned the California Public Utilities Commission to raise fares from 15 to 20 cents, with losses projected to be US$7,000 (equivalent to $82,000 in 2024) that year.

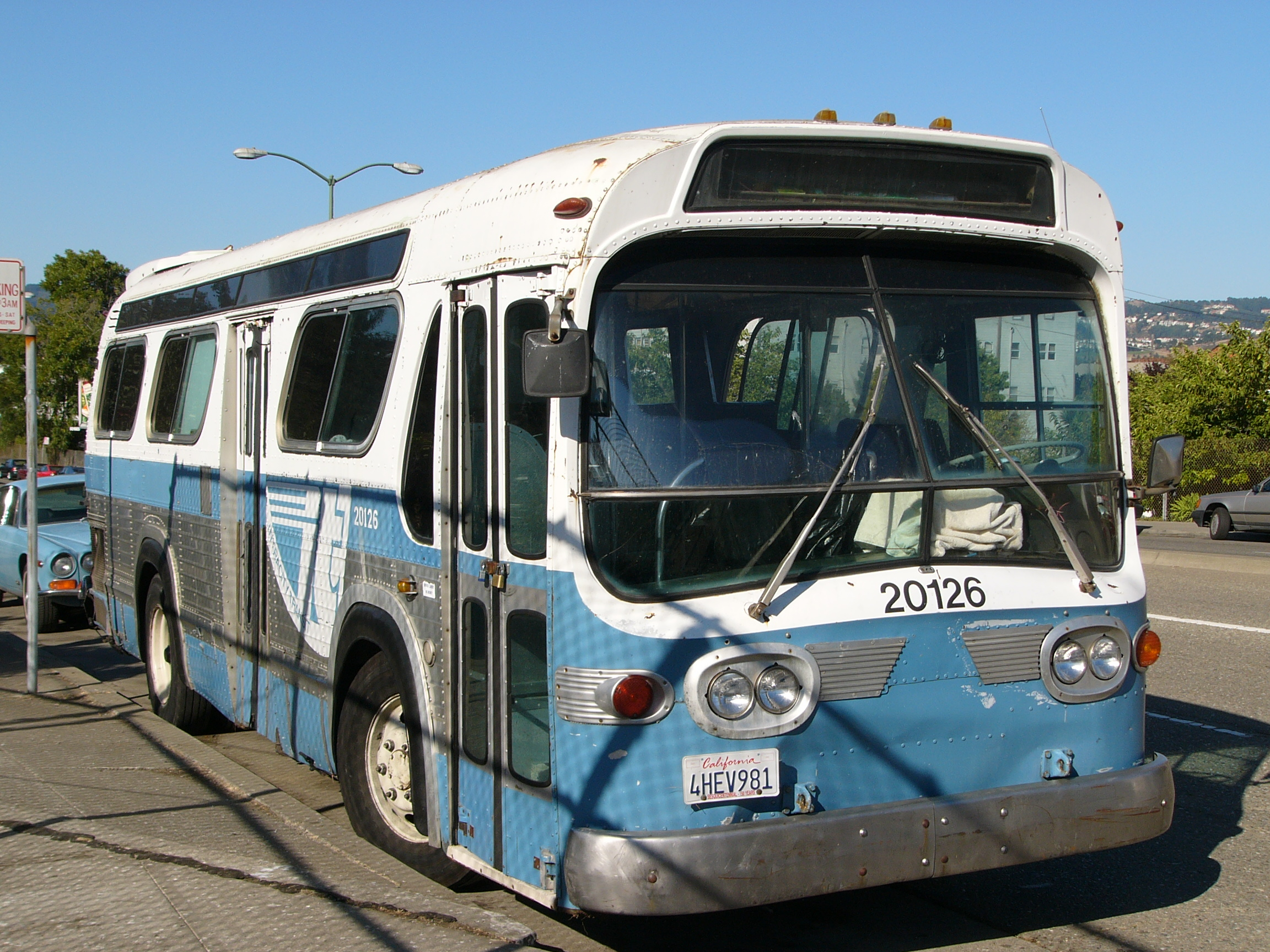
ex-Intracity Transit GM New Look bus #20126 (photographed in 2006)

By 1968, the unreliability of the aging MBS fleet led the city to purchase four new GM "old-look" transit buses, which were then leased to MBS to improve its financial health. At the time, MBS was owned and operated by Willis M. Kleinenbroich, who was responsible for maintaining, driving, and dispatching the buses. By 1973, with the service continuing to lose money, Kleinenbroich attempted to sell the company but found no private buyers; instead, it was acquired by the city of Modesto in 1973 and renamed to Intracity Transit. The city would continue to purchase several GM New Look buses in 1973 and 1976. Modesto subsequently rebranded it as Modesto Area Express in 1990.

As the New Look fleet aged, Modesto replaced them with mid-size Rapid Transit Series (1980), Gillig Phantom, and Gillig Low Floor buses; for the longer suburban/commuter express routes, Modesto has used MCI D-Series highway coaches.

=== Stanislaus County intercity services ===
Stanislaus Regional Transit was a division of the Stanislaus County Department of Public Works, which operated fixed intercity routes, mainly within the county; one route connected to neighboring Merced County.

=== Merger ===
A 2019 Transit Efficiency and Innovations Study recommended the merger of MAX and StaRT and on January 26, 2021, the Modesto City Council and the Stanislaus County Board of Supervisors each approved the merger, forming the new Stanislaus Regional Transit Authority.

== Routes ==
Route	Name	Legacy system	Terminus	via (Destinations)	Terminus	Typ. headway (minutes)	Notes / Refs.
10	Modesto/Turlock	StaRT	Modesto (Modesto Transportation Center)	SR 99 (CSUS)	Turlock (Transit Center)	60	
21	Downtown to Robertson Road	MAX	Modesto (Modesto Transportation Center)	H, Sutter, Robertson, and Paradise (Modesto HS)	Modesto (Modesto Transportation Center)	15 (M-F); 30 (Sa); 60 (Su)	
22	Downtown to McHenry/Vintage Faire Mall	MAX	Modesto (Modesto Transportation Center)	McHenry and Standiford (McHenry Village, Vintage Faire Mall)	Modesto (Vintage Faire Mall)	30 (M-Sa); 60 (Su)	
23	Downtown to McHenry	MAX	Modesto (Modesto Transportation Center)	McHenry	Modesto (McKenry & Kiernan)	30 (M-Sa); 60 (Su)	
24	Downtown to Sylvan Avenue	MAX	Modesto (Modesto Transportation Center)	Scenic, Surrey, and Lakewood (Stanislaus County Health Services Agency, Enochs HS)	Modesto (Roselle & Sylvan)	60 (M-F)	
25	Downtown to Orangeburg/Vintage Faire Mall	MAX	Modesto (Modesto Transportation Center)	Miller, Claus, Orangeburg & Sisk (Amtrak)	Modesto (Vintage Faire Mall)	30 (M-Sa); 60 (Su)	
26	Downtown to Carpenter Road	MAX	Modesto (Modesto Transportation Center)	Paradise, Carpenter & Maze (Central Catholic HS)	Modesto (Modesto Transportation Center)	30 (M-Sa); 60 (Su)	
28	Downtown to Salida and Mall	MAX	Modesto (Vintage Faire Mall)	Dale, Pirrone/Kiernan & Broadway (Gregori HS)	Modesto (Bacon & Toomes)	60 (M–F)	
29	Downtown to Crows Landing/JFK Training Center	MAX	Modesto (Modesto Transportation Center)	9th, Nadine & Hatch	Modesto (Modesto Transportation Center)	30 (M-Sa); 60 (Su)	
29T (Former 15)	Modesto, Ceres, Keyes, Turlock	StaRT	Modesto (Modesto Transportation Center)	SR 99 (Ceres, Keyes, CSUS)	Turlock (Transit Center)	60	
30	Downtown to Modesto Junior College East Campus/Prescott Road/Vintage Faire Mall	MAX	Modesto (Modesto Transportation Center)	College, Roseburg, Carver & Standiford (Modesto Junior College East)	Modesto (Vintage Faire Mall)	30 (M-Sa); 60 (Su)	
31	Downtown to Modesto Junior College East/Tully/Pelandale Ave/Vintage Faire Mall	MAX	Modesto (Modesto Transportation Center)	9th, Tully & Pelandale (Davis HS, Modesto Junior College East)	Modesto (Vintage Faire Mall)	30 (M-Sa); 60 (Su)	
32	Downtown to Mable Avenue	MAX	Modesto (Modesto Transportation Center)	Scenic, Coffee, & Mable (Downey HS, Beyer HS)	Modesto (Modesto Transportation Center)	30 (M-F); 60 (Sa,Su)	
33	Downtown to Poust Road/Modesto Junior College West Campus	MAX	Modesto (Modesto Transportation Center)	9th, Woodland, Carpenter, & California (Modesto Junior College East & West, Central Catholic HS, Modesto HS)	Modesto (Modesto Transportation Center)	30 (M-Sa); 60 (Su)	
35	Escalon Transit (eTrans)	eTrans / MAX	Escalon	McHenry	Modesto (Vintage Faire Mall)	3 daily trips	
36	Downtown to Central Valley Plaza/Vintage Faire Mall	MAX	Modesto (Modesto Transportation Center)	Rouse, Carpenter, & Sisk (Modesto Junior College West, Central Catholic HS)	Modesto (Vintage Faire Mall)	30 (M-F); 60 (Sa,Su)	
37	Downtown to Rumble Road/Vintage Faire Mall	MAX	Modesto (Modesto Transportation Center)	Yosemite, Oakdale, Sylvan, & Rumble (Beyer HS, Davis HS)	Modesto (Vintage Faire Mall)	30 (M-F); 60 (Sa,Su)	
38	Airport neighborhood (Empire & Oregon) - Downtown Modesto	MAX	Modesto (Modesto Transportation Center)	9th, D, & Yosemite (Modesto City–County Airport)	Modesto (Modesto Transportation Center)	30 (M-Sa); 60 (Su)	
40	Modesto, Grayson, Westley, Patterson	StaRT	Modesto (Modesto Transportation Center)	Crows Landing, Grayson, & SR 33 (Ceres, Grayson, Westley, Patterson, Modesto Junior College East)	Patterson (Veterans Memorial Park)	105 (M–F)	
41	Downtown to Vintage Faire Mall Express	MAX	Modesto (Modesto Transportation Center)	SR 99 (Vintage Faire Mall)	Modesto (Modesto Transportation Center)	30 (M-F); 60 (Sa,Su)	
42	Downtown to Tucson Avenue/Community Services Building	MAX	Modesto (Modesto Transportation Center)	SR 99, Crows Landing, Whitmore, & Hatch (Community Services Agency)	Modesto (Modesto Transportation Center)	30 (M-Sa); 60 (Su)	
44	Formerly Ceres Area Transit – Blacker & Hackett to Herndon & Hatch	Ceres Area Transit / MAX	Ceres (Herndon & Hatch)	Hatch, Mitchell, & Whitmore	Ceres (Blaker & Hackett)	60	
45E	Patterson to Turlock	StaRT	Patterson (Veterans Memorial Park)	E. Las Palmas & West Main (CSUS)	Turlock (Transit Center)	8 round trips (M–F)	
45W	Gustine, Newman, Crows Landing, Patterson	StaRT	Gustine (City Park)	SR 33 (Newman, Crows Landing)	Patterson (Veterans Memorial Park)	9 round trips (M–F); 5 round trips (Sa)	
60	Modesto, Riverbank, Oakdale	StaRT	Modesto (Modesto Transportation Center)	College, McHenry, Claribel, Oakdale, Patterson, & SR 108; SR 99, Dale, & Kiernan (Sat) (Riverbank, Oakdale)	Oakdale (Maag & F)	Mon-Fri every hour (Saturday Sunday every hour)	
61	Modesto, Empire, Waterford, Hickman, Hughson, Ceres	StaRT	Modesto (Modesto Transportation Center)	SR 132, Hickman, & Whitmore (Modesto City–County Airport, Empire, Waterford, Hickman, Hughson, Ceres)	Waterford (Yosemite & Western)	120 (M–Sa)	
70 ACE Commuter	Modesto, Vintage Faire Park & Ride, Lathrop ACE station	MAX	Modesto (Vintage Faire Mall; some routes originate from Modesto Transportation Center and stop at Vintage Faire)	SR 120, Airport, & Yosemite	Lathrop (Lathrop/Manteca station)	7 round trips (M–F)	
90 BART Commuter - Modesto	Modesto, Vintage Faire Park & Ride, Dublin/Pleasanton BART station	MAX	Modesto (Modesto Transportation Center & Vintage Faire Mall)	I-580	Dublin (Dublin/Pleasanton BART station)	3 round trips (M–F) saturday 6 round trip Sunday 3 round trips	
100 BART Commuter - Turlock / Patterson	Turlock, Patterson, Dublin/Pleasanton BART station	StaRT	Turlock (Fall Transit Center) & Patterson (Walmart)	West Main, I-5, & I-580	Dublin (Dublin/Pleasanton BART station)	1 round trip (M–F)	
80 Stockton Commuter	Modesto, Vintage Faire Park & Ride, Manteca, Stockton	MAX	Modesto (Modesto Transportation Center)	SR 99 (Vintage Faire Mall, Manteca)	Stockton (Stockton Transit Center)	3 round trips (M–F)	
