= Merced station (California High-Speed Rail) =

Proposed California High-Speed Rail station in Merced, California

Merced

General information
- Location: 15th Street between O & R Streets; Merced, California
- Coordinates: 37.302024°N 120.491248°W
- Owner: California High-Speed Rail Authority
- Lines: Union Pacific Fresno Subdivision, California High-Speed Rail

History
- Opening: 2030 (Amtrak and ACE); 2033 (CHSRA)

Future services
Preceding station	Altamont Corridor Express	Following station
Livingston toward San Jose	San Jose – Merced	Terminus
Livingston toward Union City	Union City – Merced	Terminus
Livingston toward Natomas/Sacramento Airport	Valley Rail	Terminus
Preceding station	Amtrak	Following station
Turlock–Denair toward Natomas/Sacramento Airport, Oakland or Sacramento	Gold Runner	Terminus
Preceding station	California High-Speed Rail	Following station
Terminus	Phase 1 Initial Operating Segment	Madera toward Anaheim
Gilroy toward San Francisco	Phase 1	Terminus

Former servivces
Preceding station	Southern Pacific Railroad	Following station
Turlock toward Oakland Pier	San Joaquin Daylight	Madera toward Los Angeles
Turlock toward Sacramento	Sacramento Daylight	Madera toward Los Angeles
Route map
Location

Merced station is a proposed California High-Speed Rail station in Merced, California, located in Downtown Merced. The originally proposed site was to have been located at ground level on Martin Luther King Jr. Way near the interchange with Route 99/59, placing it about 7 blocks south from the existing Merced Amtrak station. The station was initially intended to be the northern terminus of the system's Initial Construction Segment. An alternative location for a fully elevated station proposed by the City of Merced and other stakeholders, 8 blocks to the west-northwest along 15th Street, between O Street and R Street was approved after a supplemental environmental review. The high-speed rail line will run on the south side of the Union Pacific Railroad right-of-way.

The station is north of the planned Chowchilla Wye, where the high-speed rail splits into two branches. Merced is on the eastern branch, which at the conclusion of Phase II will continue northwards to Sacramento.

== History ==
=== Southern Pacific ===
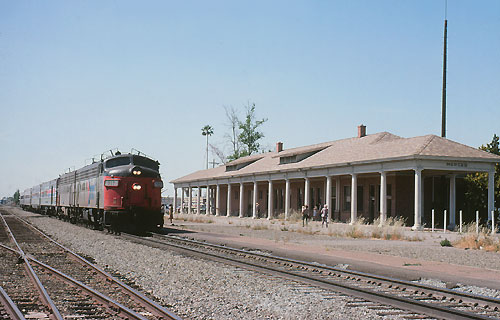
A San Joaquins train (detoured from its usual route) passing the former Southern Pacific station in 1976

The first railroad through Merced was the Central Pacific Railroad, a subsidiary of the Southern Pacific Railroad (SP), which reached the village on January 15, 1872. Charles Henry Huffman, who was the SP's agent for land acquisition, founded Merced and moved there when the railroad opened. The original village was along Bear Creek, but the town center quickly became the SP station. A branch to Oakdale (later extended to Stockton) was completed in 1891. The SP later built a new station off 16th Street at N Street.

The San Francisco and San Joaquin Valley Railroad opened through Merced in 1896, with a station at 24th Street. The Atchison, Topeka and Santa Fe Railway (AT&SF) – the SP's main rival – purchased the line in 1899, providing it a parallel competing mainline through the Central Valley.

Passenger service on both branch lines ended in the 1940s. Merced remained an important stop on the two mainlines, serving named trains including the San Francisco Chief and Golden Gate on the AT&SF, and the San Joaquin Daylight and Sacramento Daylight on the SP. On May 1, 1971, Amtrak took over intercity passenger service in the United States from the private railroads. Amtrak chose to run its San Francisco–Los Angeles service over the Coast Line rather than the Central Valley, and passenger service to Merced ended.

Amtrak began the Oakland–Bakersfield San Joaquins on March 5, 1974. The San Joaquins was controversially routed over the AT&SF rather than the SP (which ran through more major cities); the AT&SF station in Merced was used by Amtrak. The SP station was renovated in the 1990s to serve as the city bus terminal.

=== High-speed rail ===
The California High-Speed Rail Authority's February 2016 draft business plan said that the Merced station would not begin service at the same time as the initial San Jose to Bakersfield route in 2025, but would likely open in 2029 instead. The Merced City Council vigorously opposed the delay in the station opening, noting that Merced would be a prime area for commuters seeking to use high-speed rail to access jobs in Silicon Valley. In response, the April 2016 revisions to the business plan included Merced in the initial construction segment, initially as a single-track spur connecting only to the westbound track to the Bay Area, with buildout of the full Chowchilla Wye happening later. By 2024, the expected start of high-speed service at the station had become 2033.

The station was chosen as the terminus of the Merced Extension project of Altamont Corridor Express commuter rail to bring passenger rail service into Stanislaus and Merced Counties; the siting of ACE platforms will be dependent on the HSR location selection and may also change accordingly. The line is planned to open to the station in 2030.

Additionally, the San Joaquin Joint Powers Authority has plans to terminate its Gold Runner trains at the station as a feeder line into the Merced to Bakersfield high speed segment. A new rail link connecting the BNSF Stockton Subdivision on the north of Merced to the high speed rail station will facilitate the transfer.
