= Oakland Subdivision =

Railroad line in California

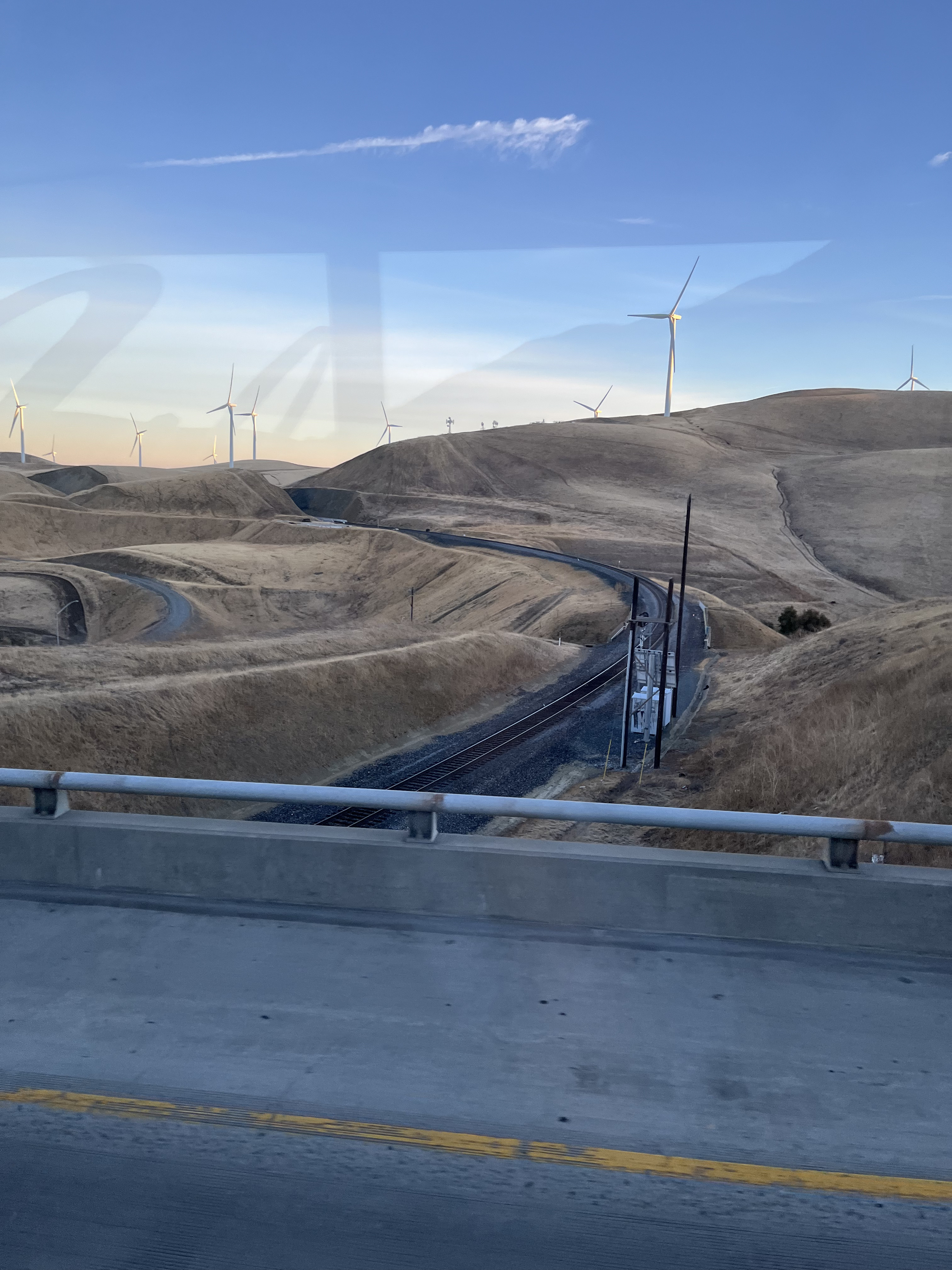
The railroad as it crosses the freeway in the Altamont Pass

The Oakland Subdivision is a Union Pacific Railroad line in the U.S. state of California. It extends from Stockton in the east to Oakland, crossing the Diablo Range at Altamont Pass and traversing Niles Canyon. The line was originally built by the Western Pacific Railroad as the final Pacific leg of their Feather River Route — it was acquired by Union Pacific upon their purchase of Southern Pacific. For its length, the line largely parallels the route of the First transcontinental railroad, the Western Pacific Railroad (1862–1870), though the Subdivision was laid out decades after the Western Pacific.

The line north and west of Niles has seen a reduction in freight movements as operations are consolidated on the parallel Niles Subdivision. Altamont Corridor Express commuter rail trains operate on the line from Niles to Lathrop and the southern leg of the Bay Area Rapid Transit system was constructed in the rail line's right of way between Fruitvale and Union City in the early 1970s.
