= Ceres station =

Ceres

General information
- Location: Railroad Avenue, Ceres, California
- Coordinates: 37.591053°N 120.957140°W
- Line: UPRR Fresno Subdivision
- Platforms: 1 side platform
- Tracks: 2

Construction
- Parking: 116 street spaces

Other information
- Status: planned

History
- Opening: 2026

Future services
Preceding station	Altamont Corridor Express	Following station
2026
Modesto toward San Jose	San Jose – Ceres	Terminus
Modesto toward Natomas/Sacramento Airport	Valley Rail	Terminus
2029
Modesto toward San Jose	San Jose – Merced	Turlock Terminus
Modesto toward Natomas/Sacramento Airport	Valley Rail	Turlock Terminus
Location

Ceres station is a future Altamont Corridor Express rail station in the city of the same name. It was expected to open to revenue service in 2024 as the terminus of the first phase of ACE's Merced Extension project to Merced, but the opening was later pushed back to 2026. The station would be located between Railroad Avenue and CA 99 near the southbound Whitmore Avenue exit underpass; the platform would only accessible approaching from the east side of the tracks. A bus will connect to Merced at first, with rail service to follow in the future. Parking will be available on nearby surface streets.
