= Sacramento Subdivision =

California railroad route

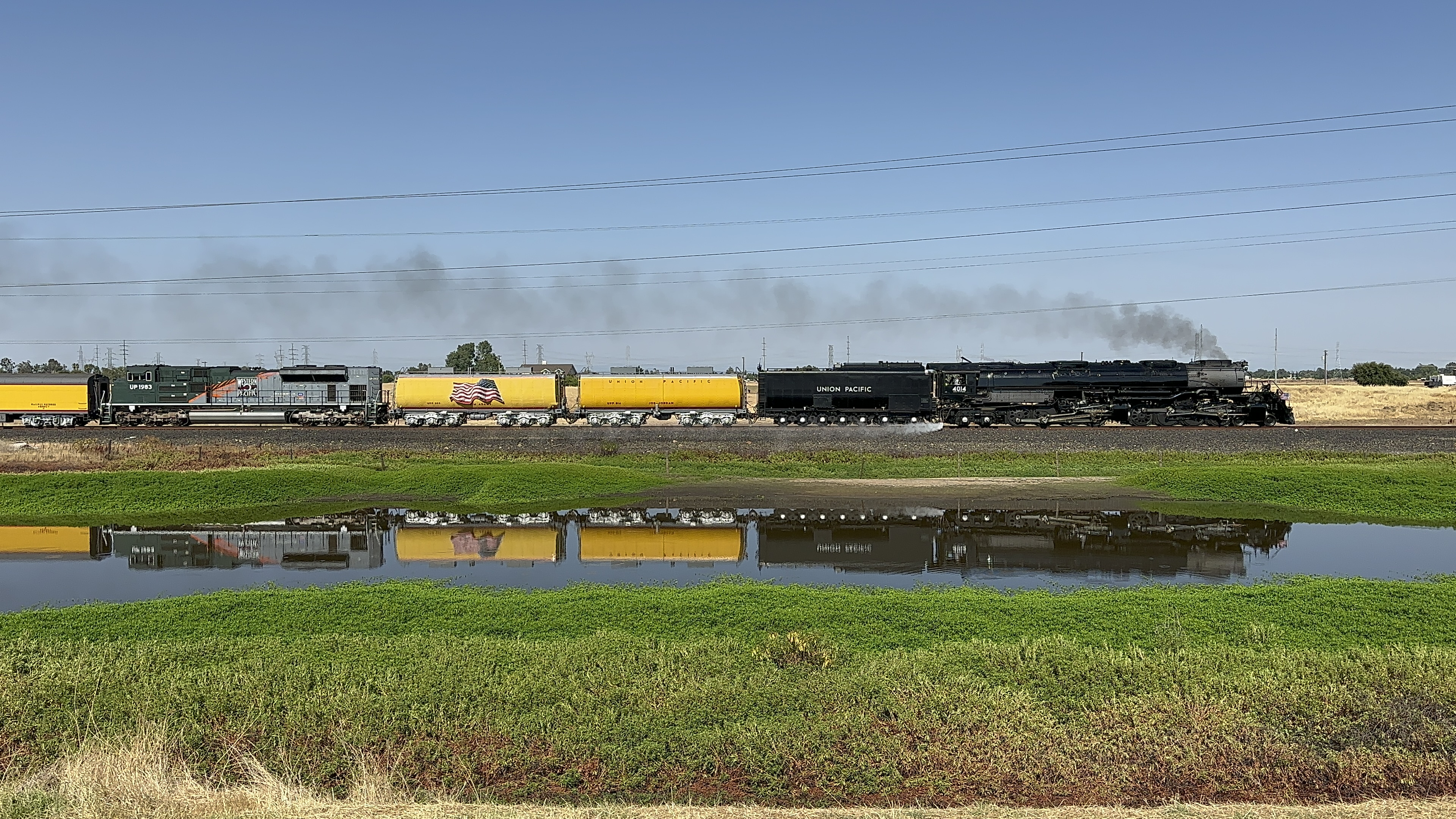
Union Pacific Big Boy 4014 in Elverta, California

The Sacramento Subdivision is a rail line owned and operated by the Union Pacific Railroad in the U.S. state of California. The line begins in Marysville as a continuation of the Canyon Subdivision at a junction with the Valley Subdivision (the former Southern Pacific Railroad line), and travels south through the Central Valley to a junction with the Fresno Subdivision in Stockton. South of Downtown Sacramento, the SacRT light rail Blue Line runs adjacent to the right of way until a flyover near Consumnes River Boulevard. The route between Sacramento and Stockton hosts about 12 to 20 freight trains daily as of 2018. Additionally, the Amtrak Coast Starlight runs over the tracks between Marysville and Sacramento.

The subdivision was formerly part of the Western Pacific Railroad Feather River Route. Passenger services along the line ceased with the cancellation of the original California Zephyr in 1970, but the Amtrak Coast Starlight was rerouted along the line starting in 1997 between Marysville and Sacramento. In the 2010s, demand had increased for more passenger services between Stockton and Sacramento, but the sole existing route along the Fresno Subdivision was deemed to be at-capacity without prohibitively expensive upgrades. This led to the parallel Sacramento Subdivision being selected to carry additional Amtrak Gold Runner and new Altamont Corridor Express commuter rail trains; the effort is usually referred to as Valley Rail. Six new stations were planned: three in Sacramento and one each near Lodi, Elk Grove, and Natomas. A proposed North Elk Grove station was eliminated from planning in September 2020.

== See also ==
- North Valley Rail
