= San Joaquin Regional Transit District =

Public transportation system in California

Overview
- Locale: Stockton, California
- Transit type: Transit bus, Paratransit, Commuter bus
- Number of stations: Downtown Transit Center; Mall Transfer Station; Hammer Transfer Station; Union Transfer Station
- Daily ridership: 9,900 (weekdays, Q2 2026)
- Annual ridership: 2,717,100 (2025)
- Website: sjRTD.com

Technical
- System length: San Joaquin County / 1,426 square miles (3,854 km^{2})

San Joaquin Regional Transit District, commonly known as San Joaquin RTD, or simply as RTD, is a transit district that provides bus service to the city of Stockton, California and the surrounding communities of Lodi, Ripon, Thornton, French Camp, Lathrop, Manteca, and Tracy. In 2025, the system had a ridership of 2,717,100, or about 9,900 per weekday as of the second quarter of 2026.

San Joaquin RTD operates 26 local fixed routes to the Stockton metropolitan area, including five BRT Express routes, RTD’s Bus Rapid Transit service. San Joaquin RTD also operates seven Metro Hopper routes that provide fixed route and complimentary deviations for ADA certified passengers and five County Hopper routes that travel to neighboring cities in San Joaquin County. County Hoppers, like Metro Hoppers are fixed routes with complimentary deviations for ADA certified passengers. Finally, they operate Commuter services includes two routes that serve Sacramento and the East Bay (Dublin/Pleasanton’s BART station), with subscription service available for commuters.

== History ==
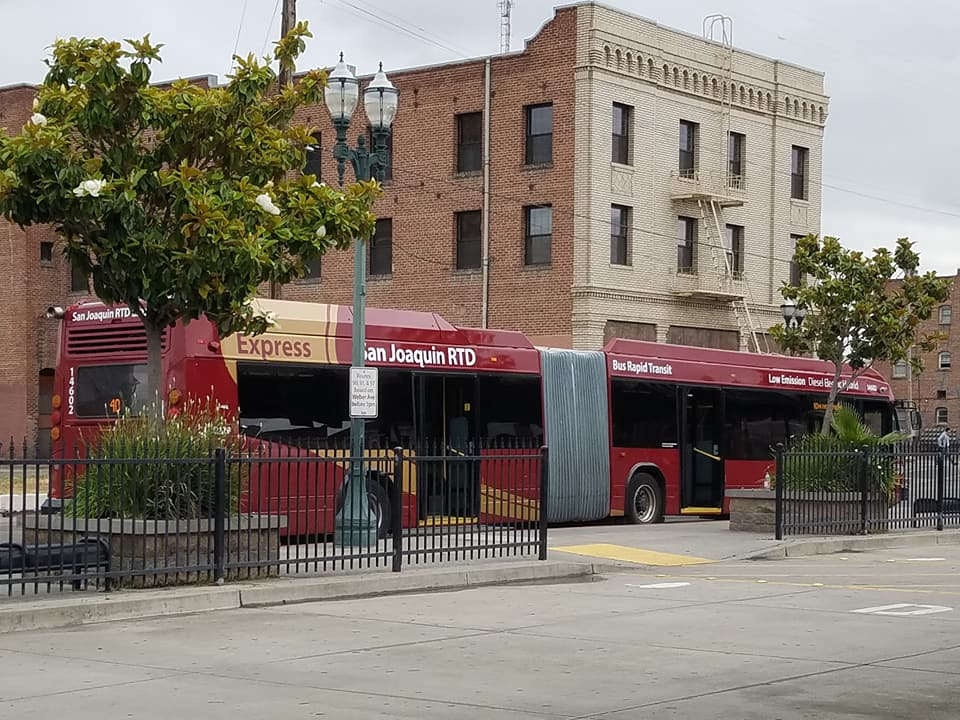
BRT Express, formerly known as the Metro Express

In 1963, legislative groundwork began for the establishment of a public transit special district in Stockton, and in 1965, the Stockton Metropolitan Transit District (SMTD) began providing service for the residents of Stockton. In late 1979, SMTD moved operations from Grant and Channel Streets to its current Lindsay Street facility. In 1985, SMTD adopted the nickname “SMART.” In 1990, SMART began providing fully accessible fixed route and Dial-A-Ride services for the elderly and persons with disabilities under the Americans with Disabilities Act (ADA) of 1990. In 1994, enabling legislation expanded SMART’s service area to the San Joaquin County border, bringing with it a name change to reflect its expansion – San Joaquin Regional Transit District, or SJRTD for short. That same year, SJRTD expanded its Interregional Commuter service to offer additional routes to commuters traveling to the Bay Area and Sacramento. In 2004, SJRTD adopted “San Joaquin RTD” as its new corporate identity and developed a new logo. That same year, RTD introduced low-emission diesel-electric hybrid buses via its “Flower Bus,” with a full-wrap sunflower display designed to complement the slogan “A Breath of Fresh Air.” At the end of 2006, RTD opened the Downtown Transit Center for the public, with a floor for employee offices. In 2017, by converting its route 44 to electric buses, RTD became the first transit agency in the United States to operate a fully electric BRT route.

== Access San Joaquin ==
A consolidated transportation agency that was formed by local transit agencies and the San Joaquin Council of Governments in San Joaquin County, RTD was designated to be the CTSA for San Joaquin County. The local agencies that make up the board of the CTSA are:

- Escalon eTrans
- Ripon Blossom Express
- City of Lathrop
- City of Lodi Grapeline
- Manteca Transit
- Tracy Tracer
- RTD

== RTD's active rolling stock ==
BRT Express
| Year | Manufacturer | Model | Length (feet) | Fleet series | Quantity | Fuel | Engine | Transmission | Image |
|---|---|---|---|---|---|---|---|---|---|
| 2007 | Gillig | Low Floor | 29 | 6200s | 11 | Diesel hybrid | Cummins ISL | Allison E^{P}40 Hybrid System | |
| 2006 | Gillig | Low Floor | 35 | 6300s | 10 | Diesel hybrid | Cummins ISL | Allison E^{P}40 Hybrid System | |
| 2010 | Gillig | BRT | 40 | 1001-1006 | 6 | Diesel hybrid | Cummins ISL9 | Allison E^{P}40 Hybrid System | |
| 2011 | Gillig | BRT | 40 | 1007-1008 | 2 | Diesel hybrid | Cummins ISL9 | Allison H 40 EP hybrid system | |
| 2012 | Gillig | BRT | 40 | 12000s | 6 | Diesel hybrid | Cummins ISL9 | Allison H 40 EP hybrid system | |
| 2013 | Nova Bus | LFS Artic | 60 | 14600s | 6 | Diesel hybrid | Cummins ISL9 | Allison H 50 EP hybrid system | |
| 2016 | Proterra | Catalyst | 40 | 16400s | 5 | Electric | | | |
| 2018 | Proterra | Catalyst | 40 | 18400s | 5 | Electric | | | |

SMA Routes
| Year | Manufacturer | Model | Length (feet) | Fleet series | Quantity | Fuel | Engine | Transmission | Image |
|---|---|---|---|---|---|---|---|---|---|
| 2009 | Gillig | Low floor | 40 | 9400s | 4 | Diesel hybrid | Cummins ISL | Allison E^{P}40 Hybrid System | |
| 2010 | Gillig | Low floor | 40 | 1400s | 2 | Diesel hybrid | Cummins ISL9 | Allison E^{P}40 Hybrid System | |
| 2013 | Gillig | Low Floor | 40 | 13400s | 20 | Diesel hybrid | Cummins ISL9 | Allison H 40 EP hybrid system | |
| 2016 | Proterra | Catalyst | 40 | 16400s | 3 | Electric | | | |
| 2022 | Gillig | Low floor EV | 40 | 22400s | 8 | Electric | | | |
| 2024 | New Flyer | XHE40 | 40 | 24401-24405 | 5 | Electric | | | |
| 2024 | Gillig | Low floor EV | 40 | 24406 | 1 | Electric | | | |
| 2024 | Gillig | BRTPlus HEV | 40 | 24407-24412 | 6 | Diesel hybrid | Cummins L9 | Allison eGen Flex H 40 hybrid system | |

Hopper routes
| Year | Manufacturer | Model | Length (feet) | Fleet series | Quantity | Fuel | Engine | Transmission | Image |
|---|---|---|---|---|---|---|---|---|---|
| 2004 | Gillig | Low Floor | 40 | 4001-4002 | 2 | Disel Hybrid | Cummins ISL | Allison E^{P}40 Hybrid System | |
| 2006 | Gillig | Low Floor | 40 | 6400s | 4 | Disel Hybrid | Cummins ISL | Allison E^{P}40 Hybrid System | |
| 2012 | Glaval | Titan II low floors | 26 | 1700s | 22 | Gasoline | | | |
| 2020 | ARBOC | Spirit of Mobility | 26 | 2026s | 4 | Gasoline | | | |

Commuter routes
| Year | Manufacturer | Model | Length (feet) | Fleet series | Quantity | Fuel | Engine | Transmission | Image |
|---|---|---|---|---|---|---|---|---|---|
| 2008 | MCI | D4500CT | 45 | 2046 | 1 | Diesel | Detroit Diesel Series 60 EGR | Allison B500 | |
| 2013 | MCI | J4500 | 45 | 13451-13452 | 2 | Diesel | Detroit Diesel DD13 | Allison B500 | |
| 2018 | Gillig | Low floor suburban configuration | 40 | 18000s | 12 | Diesel hybrid | Cummins L9 | BAE Systems HybriDrive | |
| 2021 | MCI | D45 CRT LE | 45 | 22400s | 2 | Diesel | Cummins X12 | Allison B500 | |

Van Go Mobility on Demand
| Year | Manufacturer | Model | Length (feet) | Fleet series | Quantity | Fuel | Engine | Transmission | Image |
|---|---|---|---|---|---|---|---|---|---|
| 2016 | Starcraft | Transit 350 HD | 21 | 1600s | 6 | Gasoline | | | |
| 2019 | Glaval Bus | Titan II LFs | 21 | 1900s | 14 | Gasoline | | | |

== BRT Express ==
BRT Express is RTD's express bus service and uses uniquely branded, low-emission diesel–electric hybrid buses that arrive at their stops every 15 minutes during weekday peak hours and every 30 minutes on weeknights, weekends, and holidays. BRT Express passengers are required to have a valid RTD bus pass or ticket to ride. Fare vending machines, located at BRT Express stops and the Downtown Transit Center (DTC), are available for passengers to purchase single ride and all-day passes. BRT Express uses the same fare structure and passes as RTD’s regular fixed routes and passes issued by the Fare Vending Machines can be used on any of RTD's regular fixed routes that operates within the Stockton Metropolitan Area (SMA).

== The Downtown Transit Center (DTC) ==
Completed December 2006, the DTC at 421 E. Weber St. has three off-street bus lanes, two passenger boarding platforms, and a two-story building. Nearly all RTD routes connect at the DTC, which has 20 sheltered, off-street bus stops as well as additional street side stops on the north and south sides. The DTC building incorporates the façades of three historic buildings (Hart & Thrift, Bower, and Delta) on its front elevation. The first floor of the DTC has a waiting area, public restrooms, and a customer service center where riders can get maps and schedules, purchase fares, and make customer comments. RTD leases 2,100 square feet (200 m^{2}) of retail space for a restaurant on the east end, and a police satellite station provides the DTC with two RTD-contracted police officers. A boardroom available for public meetings occupies the west end of the first floor and RTD administrative offices occupy the rest of the building.

On average, 6,000 people use the DTC each weekday.

== All Electric Fleet arriving 2025 ==
In 2018 RTD introduced their first all-electric bus route. RTD plans to have a fleet of all electric buses by 2025. The current fleet of all-electric buses as of today, are manufactured by Proterra Inc and Gillig. RTD will be receiving a hydrogen fuel bus from NFI Group in 2024 that they will be testing.

== Route List ==
This is RTD's Active Route List as of Sunday, January 25th, 2026

=== Stockton Metropolitan Area Service ===
| Route | Description |
|---|---|
| 40 | BRT Express – Pacific Corridor: DTC – HTS |
| 43 | BRT Express – Hammer Corridor: Mariners – HTS – Holman |
| 44 | BRT Express – Airport Corridor: DTC – 99 Hwy Frontage/Boeing |
| 47 | BRT Express – Midtown Corridor: DMV – DTC – Eastland Plaza – Fremont – Franklin H.S. |
| 49 | BRT Express – MLK Corridor: Edison HS - Mariposa |
| 510 | Honor Farm - SJ General Hospital - DTC |
| 515 | Eighth - Lincoln - Boggs Tract |
| 520 | DTC – West Lane – Kaiser |
| 525 | DTC - Main & Gertrude |
| 540 | Pacific Corridor: DTC - HTS |
| 545 | MTS – Quail Lakes - Pershing - Country Club |
| 555 | DTC – Stanislaus – Weston Ranch |
| 560 | DTC - Amtrak - Pixie Woods (Suspended during COVID-19) |
| 566 | HTS – Hickock - Spanos Park West |
| 571 | MTS - Cesar Chavez H.S. - Walmart - Knickerbocker/West Lane - Stagg H.S. |
| 576 | Wilson Way - DTC - Eastland Plaza - Sanguinetti |
| 578 | DTC – Pershing – Acacia |
| 580 | Oro - Wilson Way - DTC - B Street |

=== Stockton Metropolitan Area Service (Limited Weekday Crosstown Routes) ===
| Route | Description |
|---|---|
| 315 | Eighth - MLK Blvd - DTC |
| 340 | Franklin H.S. – Cesar Chavez H.S. – HTS |
| 345 | MTS – Kaiser – Morada/Diamond Bar |
| 360 | DTC – Stockton Auto Center |
| 365 | Kelly – Don – Otto (Suspended during COVID-19) |
| 375 | DTC – CalWORKs – Hammer/Holman |
| 378 | Section/Oro – DTC – MTS |
| 380 | 10th/Anne – Eighth – Franklin H.S. |
| 385 | DTC – Franklin H.S. – Frontage 99/Boeing |
| 390 | 99 Frontage/Marfargoa – Franklin H.S. – DTC |

=== Metro Hopper Service (Weekday Routes) ===
| Route | Description |
|---|---|
| 1 | March Lane - Social Security - Quail Lakes - Robinhood |
| 2 | Swain - Plymouth - Meadow |
| 3 | El Dorado - Tam O'Shanter - Kaiser - Malls |
| 4 | Fremont - Malls - Pershing - DTC - Pixie Woods |
| 5 | DTC - California - Malls - Eastland Plaza |
| 6 | Bianchi - Hammertown - Inspiration - Lorraine |
| 7 | South Stockton (Suspended indefinitely) |
| 8 | Northeast Stockton (Suspended indefinitely) |
| 9 | Wilson Way - Waterloo |

=== County Hopper Service (Weekday Routes) ===
| Route | Description |
|---|---|
| 90 | Stockton – Lathrop – Tracy |
| 91 | Stockton – Manteca – Ripon |
| 93 | Stockton – Lodi |
| 95 | Stockton – Manteca – Escalon |
| 97 | Tracy – Lathrop – Manteca |

=== County Hopper Service (Weekend Routes) ===
| Route | Description |
|---|---|
| 793 | DTC - HTS - Lodi |
| 797 | Manteca - DTC - Tracy |

=== Interregional Commuter Service ===
| Route | Description |
|---|---|
| 150 | Stockton - Dublin BART (Operates Weekdays and Weekends) |
| 152 | Stockton/Lathrop to Livermore Labs (Suspended indefinitely) |
| 163 | Stockton - Sacramento |
