= Natomas/Sacramento Airport station =

Planned terminus for the San Joaquins and Altamont Corridor Express rail services

Natomas/Sacramento Airport

General information
- Location: Blacktop Road, Sacramento, California 95673
- Coordinates: 38.684664°N 121.480089°W
- Line: UP Sacramento Subdivision
- Platforms: 1 side platform
- Tracks: 2
- Connections: Airport Shuttle

Construction
- Accessible: Yes

History
- Opening: 2026

Future service
Preceding station	Altamont Corridor Express	Following station
Terminus	San Jose – Natomas	Midtown Sacramento toward San Jose or Merced
Preceding station	Amtrak	Following station
Terminus	Gold Runner	Midtown Sacramento toward Oakland or Bakersfield
Coast Starlight does not stop here
Second phase (2029)
Preceding station	Altamont Corridor Express	Following station
Terminus	San Jose – Natomas	Old North Sacramento toward San Jose or Merced
Terminus	Union City – Natomas 2030	Old North Sacramento toward Union City
Preceding station	Amtrak	Following station
Terminus	Gold Runner	Old North Sacramento toward Oakland or Bakersfield
Coast Starlight does not stop here
Preceding station	Proposed railroads	Following station
Plumas Lake toward Chico	North Valley Rail Opening 2031	Terminus
Location
- Location within California Location within the United States

Natomas/Sacramento Airport is a planned train station that will be a stop on Altamont Corridor Express and Amtrak California's Gold Runner services. The station site is in the Natomas area, north of Sacramento, east of Blacktop Road and immediately south of West Elkhorn Boulevard. Planned as the northern terminus of the Sacramento Extension of the Valley Rail project, it was expected to open no later than 2023. By 2023, the opening date had been pushed back to 2026. A shuttle bus will provide connectivity for those traveling between the station and Sacramento International Airport, 8 miles (13 km) to the east.

== See also ==
- North Valley Rail
