= Fresno Subdivision =

California railroad route

The Fresno Subdivision is a railroad in California owned and operated by the Union Pacific Railroad. Mostly built by the Southern Pacific Railroad in the 1870s, the line traverses the San Joaquin Valley on a northwest to southeast alignment.

== Route ==
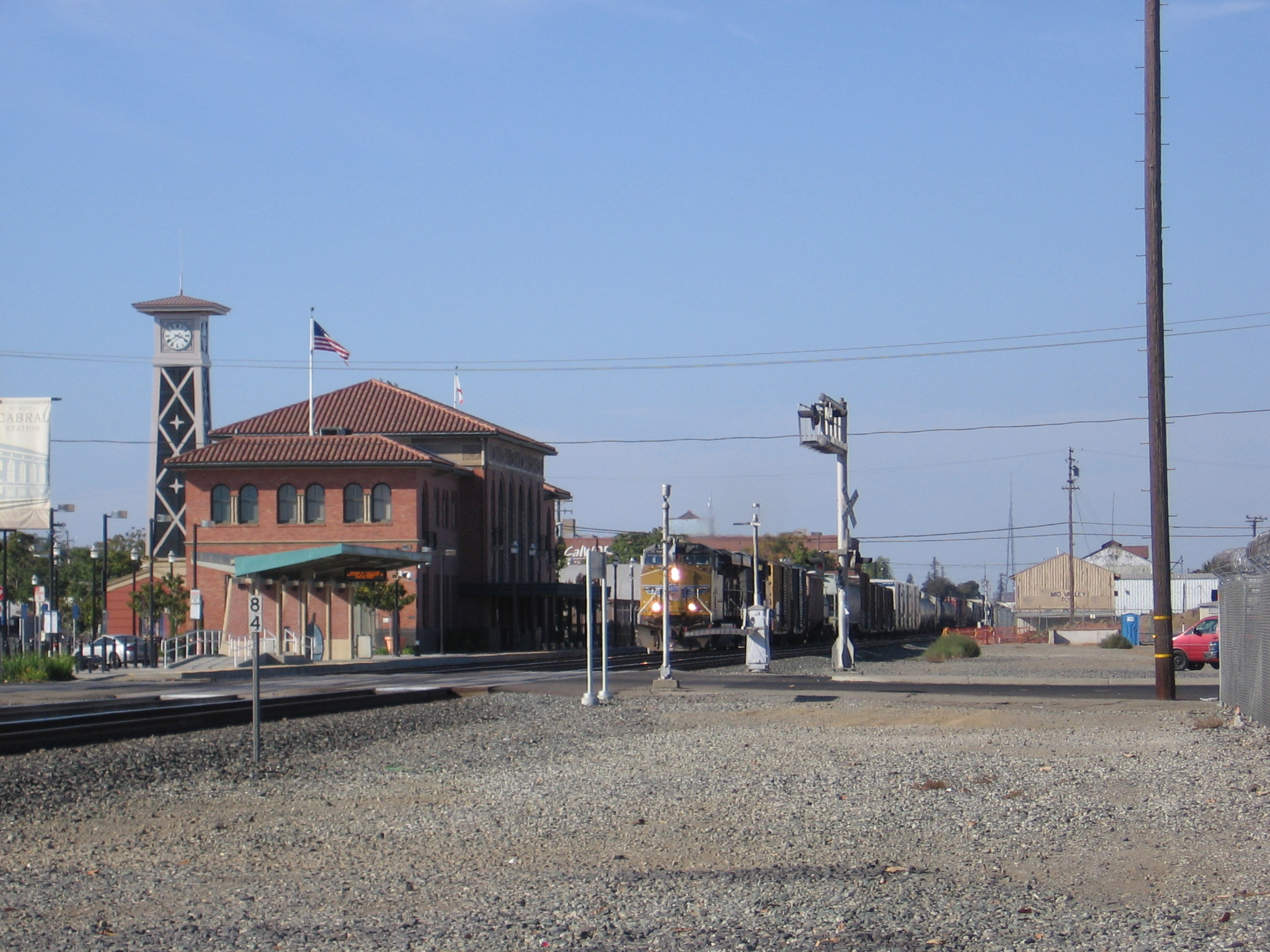
The Fresno Subdivision runs past the Stockton passenger station, 2012

The Fresno Subdivision runs from Sacramento, California through the centers of several cities in the eastern San Joaquin Valley to Bakersfield, California. From its interchange with the Martinez Subdivision in the north, it runs south through Elk Grove, Lodi, Stockton, Manteca, Modesto, Merced, and Madera before entering Fresno. The line intersects with the BNSF Railway Stockton Subdivision at Stockton, forming the Stockton Diamond. It largely parallels the BNSF Railway Stockton Subdivision and California State Route 99.

== Operations ==
The line is primarily used for freight movements. As of 2003 a total of 16 trains daily operated between Fresno and Stockton, with 12 operating between Stockton and Sacramento. The San Joaquin Valley Railroad has trackage rights over the line south of Fresno.

Amtrak and the Altamont Corridor Express operate passenger trains over the northern segment of line. Altamont Corridor Express is also expanding its service area, with new stations along the line planned as far south as Merced.

== History ==
The line was largely built by the Southern Pacific Railway in the late 1800s. The tracks between Sacramento and Lathrop run on the route of the original Central Pacific Railroad. The branch line from Lathrop reached Goshen in August 1872, Delano in July the following year, and had extended past Bakersfield to Caliente in 1875. The merger of Southern Pacific and Union Pacific in 1996 brought the line under its current ownership.

Ten miles (16 km) of the line between Ceres and Turlock is expected to be double-tracked as part of the Altamont Corridor Express expansion.
