= Gold Runner =

Amtrak service in San Joaquin Valley, California

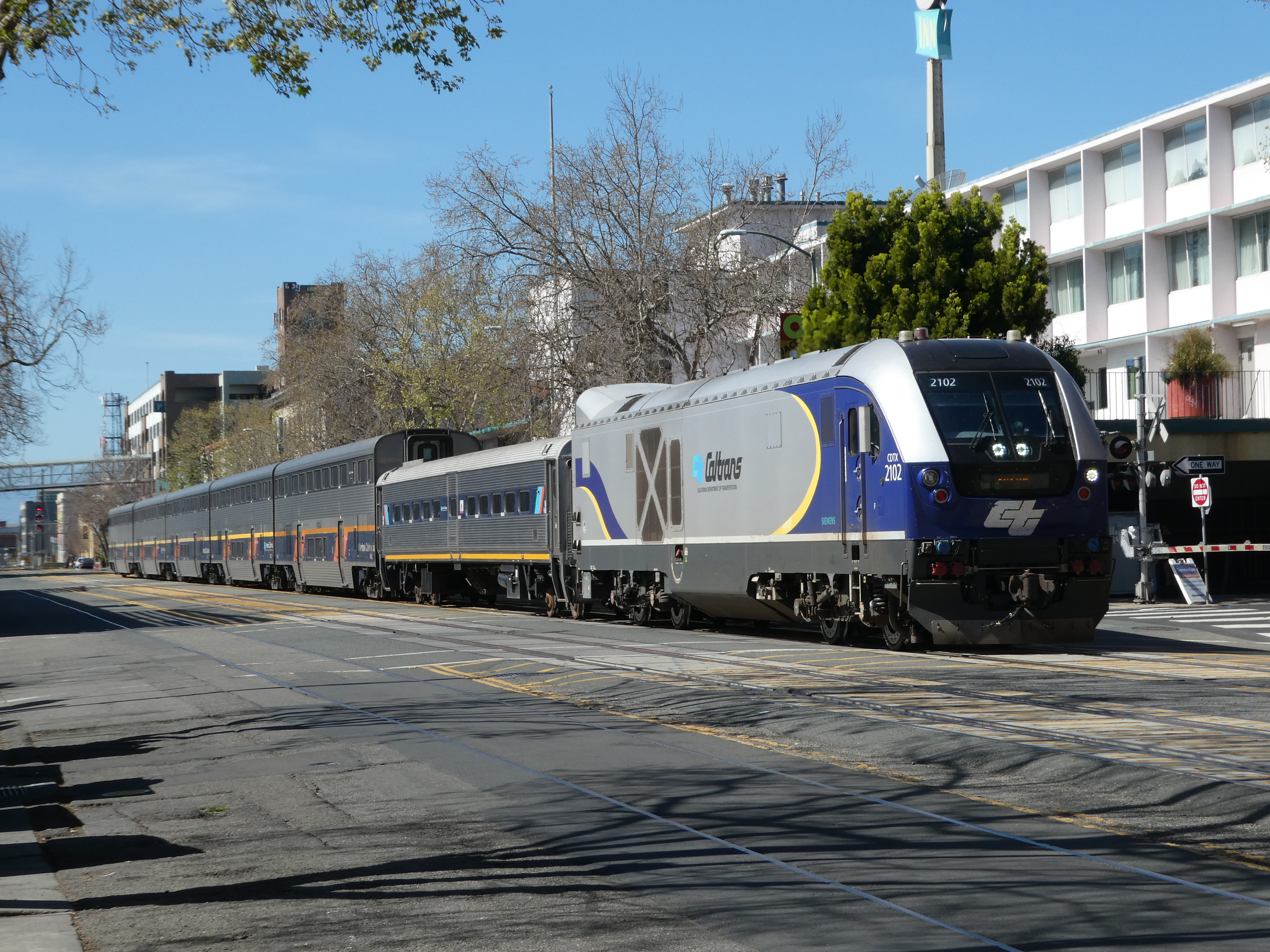
- Then- San Joaquins train approaches the Oakland–Jack London Square station, 2024

Overview
- Service type: Inter-city rail
- Locale: San Joaquin Valley
- Predecessor: Golden Gate, San Joaquin Daylight
- First service: March 5, 1974; 52 years ago
- Current operators: San Joaquin Joint Powers Authority, in partnership with Amtrak, Caltrans, SJRRC and TransitAmerica Services
- Annual ridership: 899,903 (FY 25) ▼ -1% (Note: Amtrak's Fiscal Year (FY) runs from October 1 of the prior year to September 30 of the named year.)
- Website: goldrunner.com

Route
- Termini: Oakland or Sacramento; Bakersfield
- Stops: 16 (Oakland–Bakersfield); 13 (Sacramento–Bakersfield)
- Distance travelled: 315 mi (507 km) (Oakland–Bakersfield); 282 mi (454 km) (Sacramento–Bakersfield)
- Average journey time: 6 hours (Oakland–Bakersfield); 5 hours (Sacramento–Bakersfield)
- Train number: 701–704, 710–719

On-board services
- Class: Coach Class
- Disabled access: All cars (lower level), all stations
- Catering facilities: Café
- Baggage facilities: Overhead bins, luggage racks, checked baggage available at selected stations

Technical
- Rolling stock: California Car; Comet Car; EMD F59PHI; Siemens Charger; Siemens Venture
- Track gauge: 4 ft 8 1/2 in (1,435 mm) standard gauge
- Operating speed: 52 mph (84 km/h) (avg.); 79 mph (127 km/h) (top)
- Track owners: BNSF, UP
Route map
Gold Runner highlighted in blue

The Gold Runner (formerly San Joaquins) is a state-supported passenger train service operated by Amtrak in California's San Joaquin Valley. As of 2025, the service operates seven daily round trips between its southern terminus at Bakersfield and Stockton. Of these, five continue to Oakland and two to Sacramento.

The service is notable for its extensive network of dedicated Amtrak Thruway bus routes, which are integral to its overall performance. More than 55% of riders use a Thruway bus for at least one segment of their journey. These routes are timed to connect with train arrivals and departures, and offer service to destinations across the state, including Southern California (notably Los Angeles Union Station, where passengers can transfer to the Pacific Surfliner or Amtrak's long-distance services), San Francisco, the Central Coast, the North Coast, the High Desert (including Las Vegas), Redding, Reno, and the Yosemite Valley.

With 899,903 passengers in fiscal year 2025—a -1% change from the previous year—the Gold Runner ranked as Amtrak's seventh-busiest route nationwide and third-busiest in California.

Like other intercity rail services in California, the Gold Runner is managed by a joint powers authority: the San Joaquin Joint Powers Authority (SJJPA). Its board includes two elected representatives from each of the eight counties served by the route. The SJJPA contracts the San Joaquin Regional Rail Commission to oversee daily operations, Amtrak to operate the trains, and TransitAmerica Services for maintenance of locomotives and passenger cars. Caltrans funds the service and owns the rolling stock.

In 2025, the service was renamed from San Joaquins to Gold Runner to better represent the area serviced, which stretches beyond the San Joaquin Valley, and to match the whimsical names of other rail services in California.

== History ==
=== Golden Gate/San Joaquin Daylight ===
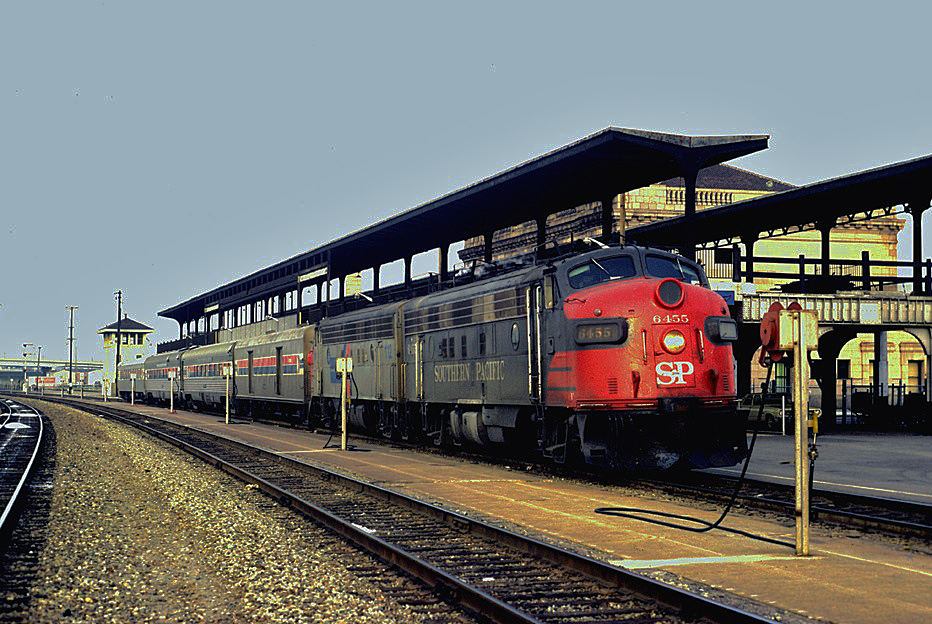
Ex-Southern Pacific EMD FP7 on the San Joaquin at Oakland in 1975

The Gold Runner service uses several routes which once hosted a variety of daily passenger trains. Chiefly, those trains were the Golden Gate of the Atchison, Topeka and Santa Fe Railway (today BNSF), and the San Joaquin Daylight of the Southern Pacific Railroad (today Union Pacific). Other named passenger trains which served the Central Valley corridor included Southern Pacific's Owl Limited, and Santa Fe's San Francisco Chief and Valley Flyer.

Like the modern Gold Runner, the Santa Fe's Golden Gate service ran from Oakland to Bakersfield, with motor coach connections to Los Angeles. However, the Southern Pacific's San Joaquin Daylight continued beyond Bakersfield, directly to Los Angeles via the Tehachapi and Newhall mountain passes; in 1958, the complete journey took just over twelve hours — six hours, fifty-four minutes between the railroad’s Oakland 16th Street and Bakersfield depots, and a further five hours, eight minutes to Los Angeles.

In April 1965, as ridership on passenger trains continued to drop, Santa Fe received permission from the Interstate Commerce Commission to severely curtail Golden Gate operations, and the service was entirely discontinued in 1968. The Southern Pacific's San Joaquin Daylight was discontinued with the start-up of Amtrak in May 1971.

=== Amtrak era ===
Amtrak routed all Los Angeles-San Francisco service over the Southern Pacific's Coast Line in its initial 1971 route structure, leaving the San Joaquin Valley without service. In 1972, Amtrak began to revisit the decision at the urging of area congressmen, notably Bernice F. Sisk, who favored service from Barstow to either Oakland or Sacramento. The inaugural run occurred on March 5, 1974, and revenue service began the following day — with one daily round-trip between Bakersfield and Oakland, and bus connections from Bakersfield to Los Angeles, and Oakland to San Francisco. The San Joaquin could not continue south of Bakersfield due to capacity limits over the Tehachapi Loop, the only line between Bakersfield and points south and one of the world's busiest single-track freight rail lines. Amtrak chose the Santa Fe route over the Southern Pacific, citing the higher speed of the Santa Fe – 79 miles per hour (127 km/h) versus 70 miles per hour (113 km/h) – and freight congestion on the Southern Pacific. The decision was not without controversy, with Sisk alleging that the Southern Pacific lobbied the Nixon administration to influence the decision.

Madera station and Richmond station were added on October 30, 1977, along with a Stockton–Sacramento connecting bus. The schedule was changed on July 19, 1979, with an earlier northbound and later southbound departure, allowing single-day round trips to the Bay Area.

=== Caltrans era ===
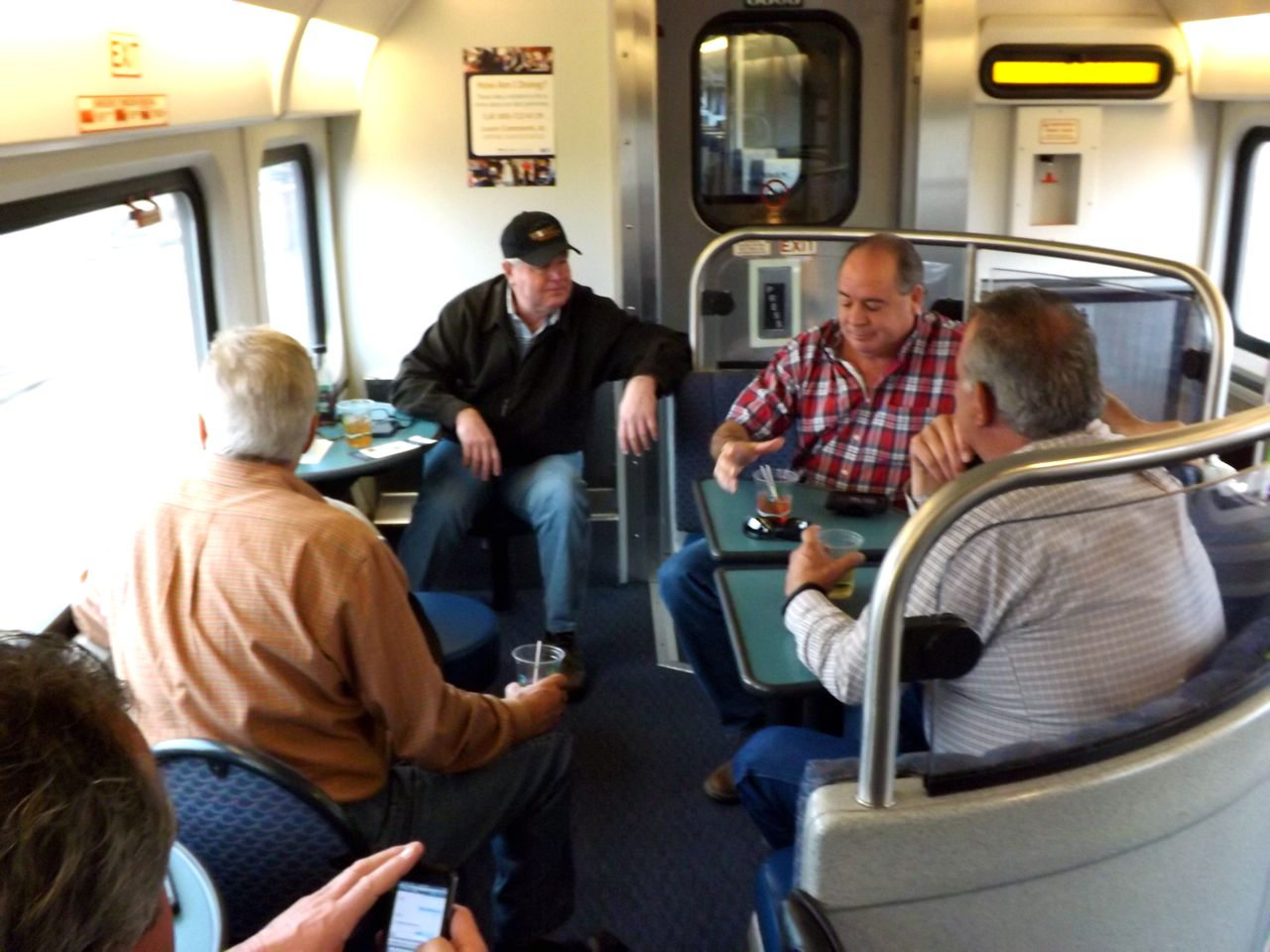
Passengers in the lounge seating area in the café car of a San Joaquins train, 2014

In 1979 Amtrak proposed discontinuing the San Joaquin as part of system-wide reductions ordered by the Carter administration. The state of California stepped in to provide a yearly subsidy of (then) $700,000 ($3.11 million adjusted for inflation) to cover the train's operating losses, and it was retained. The state asked Amtrak to add a second round-trip between Oakland and Bakersfield and to extend the service south over the Tehachapi Pass to Los Angeles. Amtrak added the second train on February 4, 1980, but attempts to extend the train over the Tehachapi Loop failed due to Southern Pacific's opposition.

A third round trip was added on December 17, 1989. Two days later, southbound San Joaquin train 708 collided with a tractor-trailer rig at a crossing east of Stockton, killing the driver of the rig and two Amtrak engineers. A fourth round trip was added on October 25, 1992. On May 16, 1999, Amtrak added a Sacramento–Bakersfield round trip - the fifth daily San Joaquins service round trip. A second Sacramento–Bakersfield round trip was added on March 18, 2002, along with an infill station at Lodi.

=== Transfer to local control ===
Expansion of the service would stagnate after 2002, and 10 years later, frustrated by what was perceived to be Caltrans' slow response to regional concerns, local leaders pushed lawmakers to allow local control of the San Joaquins service.

On September 29, 2012, Governor Jerry Brown signed Assembly Bill 1779, which enabled regional government agencies to form the San Joaquin Joint Powers Authority (SJJPA) to assume administration and management of the route, while the state of California would continue to fund operations. Under the joint powers authority model, the service would be governed by a board composed of eight elected officials, appointed by an agency in each of the counties the train travels through. The governance structure was modeled after the Capitol Corridor Joint Powers Authority, which has been operating the Capitol Corridor regional train in Northern California since 1998.

The first SJJPA board meeting was held on March 22, 2013, to begin planning for the shift in control. In that time, the SJJPA board contracted with the San Joaquin Regional Rail Commission to provide day-to-day management of the service and contracted with Amtrak to continue to operate the service and maintain the rolling stock (locomotives and passenger cars). Control of the San Joaquins shifted from Caltrans to the SJJPA on July 1, 2015.

A fifth Oakland–Bakersfield round trip was added to the service on June 20, 2016, the first expansion of the service in more than 14 years.

Two years later, the SJJPA established an early-morning "Morning Express Service" between Fresno and Sacramento, allowing same-day trips to the state capitol for the first time, was expected to result in increased ridership from business travelers. The change was criticized by Bakersfield-area officials, because it required ending the last southbound train of the day in Fresno, reducing daily service to Bakersfield by one daily round trip. The service began on May 7, 2018, but proved to be unpopular, with ridership counts showing an average of just 50 people on the train, compared to 130 with the old timetable. The "Morning Express Service" was eliminated one year later on May 6, 2019, and trains were reverted to their previous schedule.

Sacramento service was discontinued and one round-trip to Oakland was cancelled on March 25, 2020, amid the COVID-19 pandemic. The cancelled Oakland trip was restored on June 28, 2021, and one Sacramento round trip was restored on October 18, 2021. The second Sacramento round trip was restored on December 8, 2025, returning the Gold Runner to the pre-pandemic schedule.

=== Future ===
==== Near-term service adjustments ====
As of 2025, the SJJPA is studying methods to reduce or eliminate crew expenses. The Authority aims to replace staffed café cars on the Gold Runner with more cost-effective alternatives; on May 5, 2025, all onboard food sales — including the sale of hot food and alcoholic drinks — were discontinued, and replaced with complimentary grab-and-go assortments of snacks and soft drinks. The change was billed as providing "equitable service across the board." The SJJPA is exploring a long-term solution of installing automated vending machines on all trains — similar to automat cars historically used on Southern Pacific's San Joaquin Daylight.

As well, Oakland to Bakersfield trips take just over six hours, which requires an expensive crew change in Merced; previously, the Authority investigated terminating some trains at Emeryville, skipping stops on some trains, increasing current 79-mile-per-hour (127 km/h) speeds to 90 miles per hour (140 km/h), and/or operational improvements like decreasing dwell times, but these proposals were later removed from the Authority's Business Plan Updates, from 2023 onward.

Under their operating agreement with Amtrak, the SJJPA is provided the rights to use the service mark "Amtrak San Joaquins" from the railroad, free of charge; the Authority considers the service mark difficult for customers to spell, and believes it limits public understanding of the scope of the services provided by the Authority. In March 2025, the Authority adopted a resolution to rebrand the service to the "Gold Runner", and the service was rebranded in November 2025.

==== Long-term service advancements ====
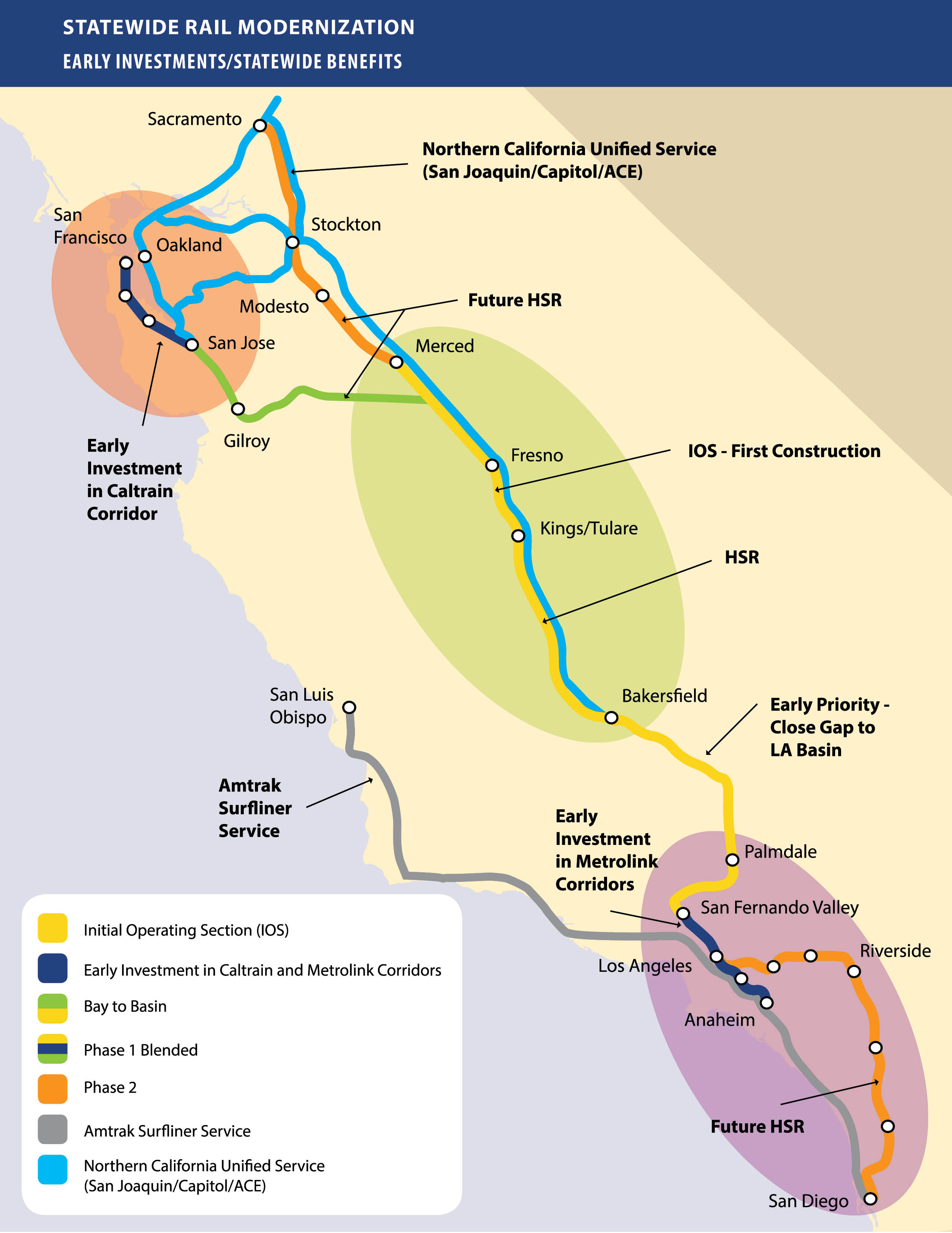
2013 map of planned intercity rail improvements in California

As of 2025, the SJJPA is increasing capacity on its routes to avoid conflicts with freight trains and add additional trips as well as plan for connections to the California High-Speed Rail system. These improvements are being done in cooperation with Altamont Corridor Express (ACE) as part of the Valley Rail project.

The Stockton Diamond, a level junction in Stockton where the two Gold Runner routes diverge, was the busiest rail junction in the state by 2019. As part of the Valley Rail project, these lines will be grade separated: the north-south Union Pacific line is planned to be elevated over the BNSF line. This project is expected to finish construction in Summer 2027 (as of Dec 2024).

Altamont Corridor Express, Capitol Corridor, and San Joaquins schematic route map, with Valley Rail project extensions. The Sacramento Extension project segment, connecting Stockton and Sacramento, uses the Sacramento Subdivision, which runs parallel to and west of the present route, which uses the Fresno Subdivision.

Two additional Sacramento round trips are planned to be added, routed over the Union Pacific Railroad Sacramento Subdivision north of Stockton and west of the present route, which uses the Fresno Subdivision north of Stockton. Unlike the 1999-initiated route, the Sacramento Subdivision has spare capacity to allow the increased service. Six new stations are planned: Lodi (distinct from the Lodi Transit Station), Elk Grove, three locations in Sacramento, and Natomas. Trains operating on the Sacramento Subdivision route will not serve the existing Sacramento Valley Station, but SacRT light rail connections and a shuttle bus to Sacramento International Airport are planned elsewhere.

When the Valley Rail project is complete, ACE will share the route to Natomas from Stockton and add an additional branch south to Ceres in 2023 with an extension to Merced in 2027. When the Natomas runs are initiated, one existing Oakland trip is planned to terminate at Stockton-Downtown, freeing a slot for a full Natomas to Bakersfield round-trip while continuing to provide five trips from the Bay Area.

The San Joaquin Joint Powers Authority will serve as the high-speed rail service provider in the Valley per a memorandum of understanding with the California High-Speed Rail Authority. Upon completion of the high-speed rail initial operating segment, trains are expected to terminate at that system's new Merced station to act as a feeder to high-speed service. A new rail link is planned to connect the BNSF and Union Pacific lines, to allow Gold Runner trains to access the new station directly.Sacramento to Merced service is thus planned to increase in frequency to hourly service.

In December 2023, the Federal Railroad Administration accepted an application by Caltrans to enter the Gold Runner route into its Corridor Identification and Development Program. Proposed improvements include additional frequencies and an extension north to Chico and Redding. The program grants $500,000 toward service planning and prioritizes the corridor for future federal funding.

In 2024, the Butte County Association of Governments released a Strategic plan, named North Valley Rail to extend The San Joaquins service to Chico. Construction is expected to commence in 2029. The SJJPA is investigating a further extension to Redding.

Longer-term proposals include extending Oakland trains to Oakland Coliseum station to provide a connection to Oakland International Airport and an additional BART connection, routing some trains via the ACE route through the Tri-Valley, and consolidating all Stockton service at either Robert J. Cabral Station, or a station east of the developing Stockton Diamond junction. The SJJPA is also working with Caltrans and the Capitol Corridor Joint Powers Authority to develop a plan to enable some Gold Runner or Capitol Corridor services to be short-turned at Martinez.

== Route ==
Gold Runner route map

The Gold Runner service runs from Bakersfield's Truxtun Avenue station northward on BNSF Railway's Mojave Subdivision within Bakersfield, the Bakersfield Subdivision from Bakersfield to Calwa (Fresno), then on the Stockton Subdivision from Calwa to Stockton.

At the Stockton Diamond the routes split to Oakland or Sacramento.

The Oakland trains continue west on the Stockton Subdivision to Port Chicago. At Port Chicago they cross to the Union Pacific Railroad's Tracy Subdivision to Martinez, continue on the Martinez Subdivision to Emeryville, and finally travel a few miles on the Niles Subdivision to Oakland's Jack London Square station.

Trains to the Sacramento Valley Station diverge in Stockton and run north to Sacramento on Union Pacific's Fresno Subdivision and on the Martinez Subdivision within Sacramento.

If the tracks for the Central Valley segment of California High-Speed Rail (HSR) are completed prior to that system's full startup, there are calls for the Gold Runner trains to use the HSR infrastructure to speed up traditional rail service to 125 mph.

The route is Amtrak's seventh-busiest service in the nation and the railroad's third-busiest in the state of California.

== Stations ==
The entire route is located in the U.S. state of California.

The Gold Runner service has an extensive network of dedicated Amtrak Thruway buses. Over 55% of passengers on the route used an Amtrak Thruway bus on at least one end of their trip.

Station	Service		Connections
Station	OKJ	SAC	Connections
Sacramento		●	Amtrak: California Zephyr, Capitol Corridor, Coast Starlight; Amtrak Thruway: 3 (Chico–Stockton), 5 (Redding), 20 (Reno), 20C (South Lake Tahoe); SacRT: Gold; El Dorado Transit, Sacramento RT
Lodi		●	Amtrak Thruway: 3 (Chico–Sacramento–Stockton); Lodi GrapeVine, San Joaquin RTD, South County Transit; Greyhound
Stockton–Downtown		●	Amtrak Thruway: 3 (Chico–Sacramento), 6 (San Jose); Altamont Corridor Express; San Joaquin RTD
Oakland	●		Amtrak: Coast Starlight, Capitol Corridor; Amtrak Thruway: 17 (San Luis Obispo–San Jose–Santa Barbara); AC Transit
Emeryville	●		Amtrak: California Zephyr, Capitol Corridor, Coast Starlight; Amtrak Thruway: 99 (San Francisco); AC Transit, Emery Go-Round
Richmond	●		Amtrak: California Zephyr, Capitol Corridor; BART: Orange Line, Red Line; AC Transit; Flixbus
Martinez	●		Amtrak: California Zephyr, Capitol Corridor, Coast Starlight; Amtrak Thruway: 7 (Napa–Santa Rosa–Arcata); County Connection, Tri Delta Transit, WestCAT
Antioch–Pittsburg (Note: Oakley station is under construction, and will replace Antioch–Pittsburg when complete.)	●		Tri Delta Transit
Oakley	●		Tri Delta Transit
Stockton–San Joaquin Street	●		Amtrak Thruway: 3 (Redding–Sacramento), 6 (San Jose); San Joaquin RTD
Modesto	●	●	StanRTA
Turlock–Denair	●	●	
Merced	●	●	Amtrak Thruway: 15A (Yosemite National Park), 40 (San Jose); CatTracks, The Bus, YARTS
Madera	●	●	
Fresno	●	●	Amtrak Thruway: 15B (Yosemite National Park); FAX, FCRTA, YARTS; Greyhound
Hanford	●	●	Amtrak Thruway: 18 (Central Coast, select dates); KART; Greyhound
Corcoran	●	●	Corcoran Area Transit, KART
Colonel Allensworth State Historic Park (Note: Limited service by appointment only for groups of 20 or more)	●	●	
Wasco	●	●	Kern Transit
Bakersfield	●	●	Amtrak Thruway: 1 (Los Angeles), 10 (Santa Barbara–Las Vegas), 19 (Inland Empire); Golden Empire Transit, Kern Transit; Greyhound

== Statistics ==
=== Annual ridership ===
FY*	Ridership	%±	FY*	Ridership	%±
2024	909,551	▲7.3%	2015	1,177,073	▼0.9%
2023	847,364	▲19.3%	2014	1,188,228	▼2.6%
2022	710,051	▲63.6%	2013	1,219,818	▲6.6%
2021	434,099	▼28.5%	2012	1,144,616	▲7.2%
2020	606,728	▼43.4%	2011	1,067,441	▲9.2%
2019	1,071,190	▼0.7%	2010	977,834	▲5.2%
2018	1,078,707	▼3.7%	2009	929,172	▼2.2%
2017	1,120,037	▼0.2%	2008	949,611	▲18.0%
2016	1,122,301	▼4.7%	2007	804,785	—N/a

== Rolling stock ==
For its first two years of operation, the San Joaquin used single-level coaches Amtrak had inherited from other railroads. In October 1976, Amtrak introduced new Amfleet coaches to the service. From 1987 to 1989 Amtrak used Superliner and ex-ATSF Hi-Level coaches. For a short period beginning on June 15, 1987, this included a full dining car on one of the trains. Amtrak reequipped the San Joaquins trains again in 1989, this time with new Horizon coaches, when service expanded to three daily round-trips. The San Joaquins began receiving Superliner-derived, bi-level California Cars in 1995. The bi-level fleet was supplemented by a fleet of single-level Comet Cars (refurbished NJ Transit cars) between 2013 and 2024. Between 2024 and 2026, both the bi-level and Comet Car fleets are expected to be replaced by single-level Siemens Venture trainsets.

Daily inspections, cleaning, and maintenance of equipment are conducted in Oakland, Bakersfield, and Sacramento. Heavy maintenance is performed by Transit Services America in Stockton. Previously, all maintenance took place in Oakland, but both the Capitol Corridor and San Joaquins voted to shift to a new contractor in 2023, citing the contractor's ability to adhere to high maintenance quality and cleanliness and be more agile with overhaul projects.

The San Joaquin Regional Rail Commission selected Herzog Transit Services for maintenance of cars and locomotives in 2025.

=== Locomotives ===
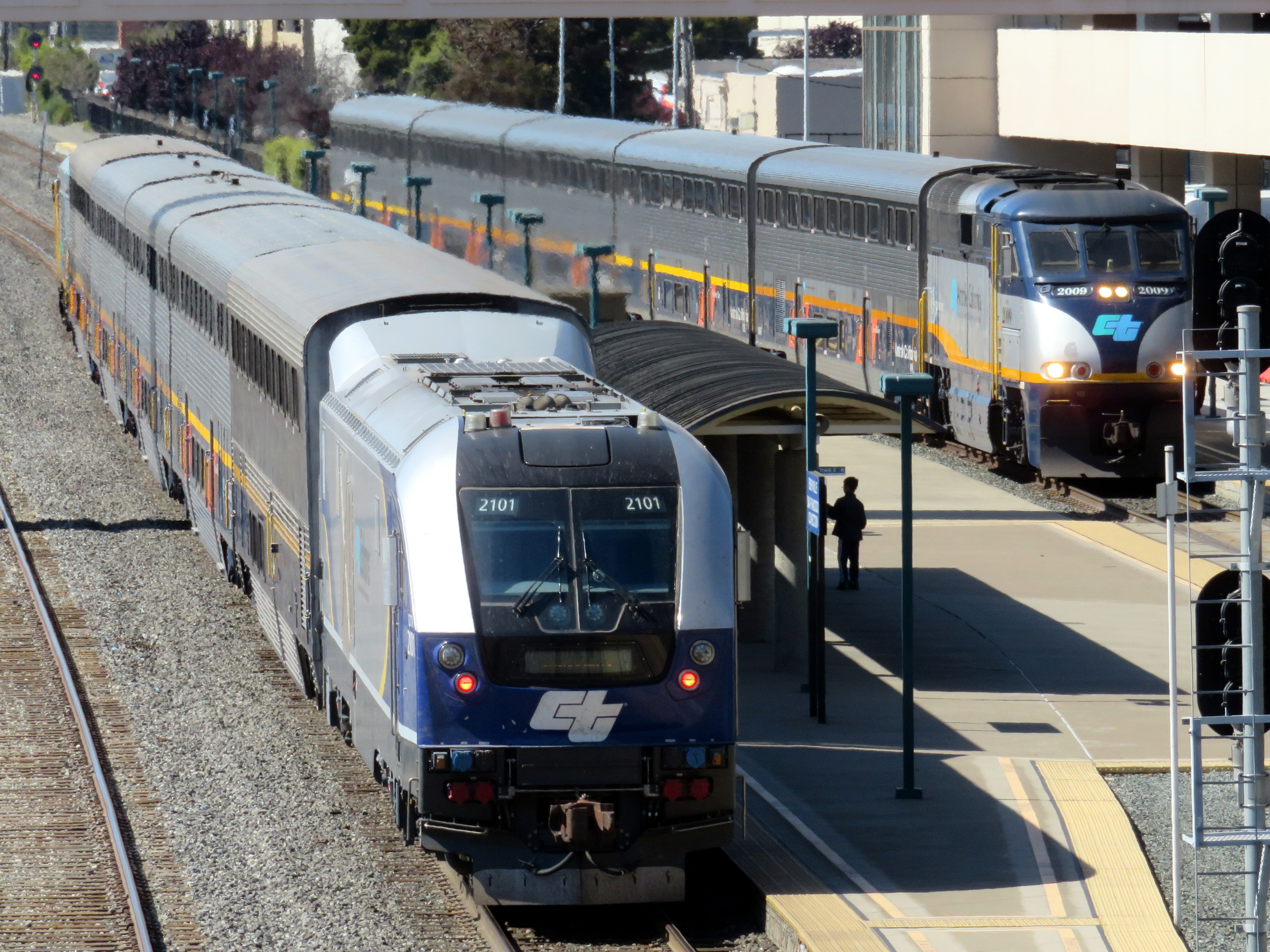
A San Joaquins train powered by a Siemens Charger (left) and Capitol Corridor powered by a F59PHI (right) at Emeryville station, June 2018

The Gold Runner and Capitol Corridor share a combined fleet of 13 EMD F59PHI and ten Siemens Charger SC-44 locomotives.

The Charger locomotives meet EPA Tier IV emission standards and are capable of operating at 125 mph in revenue service. Many of the F59PHI have been re-engined to meet more stringent EPA Tier II emission standards.

These locomotives are owned by Caltrans and carry its CDTX reporting marks. Amtrak-owned locomotives are also occasionally used on the Gold Runner, including the P42DC.

=== California and Surfliner Car bi-level trainsets ===
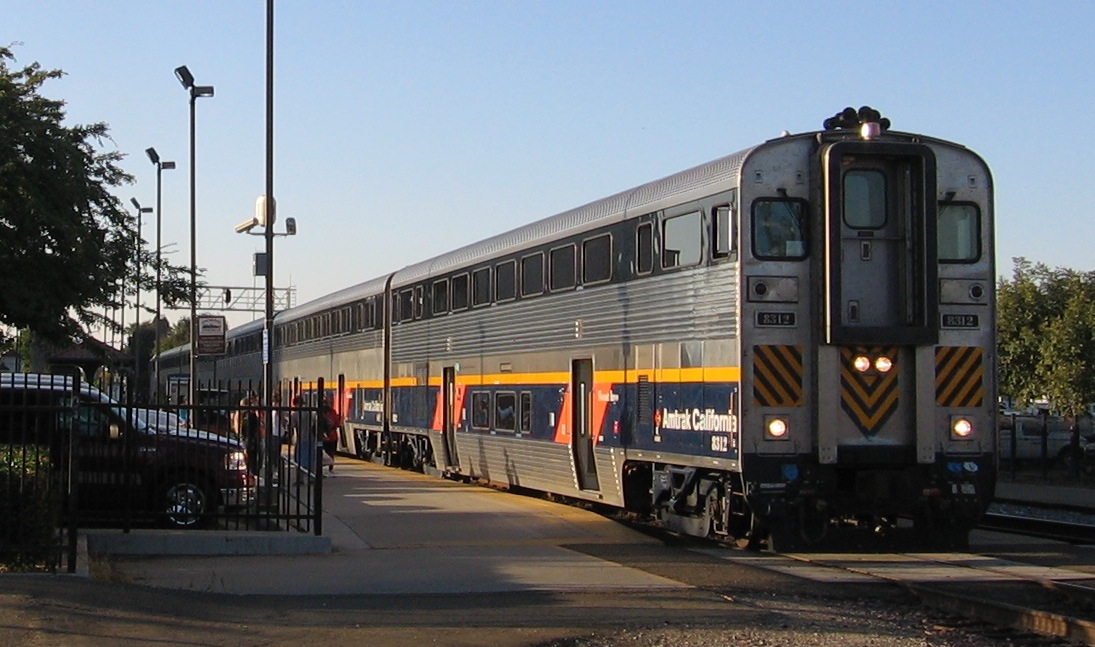
A bi-level "California Car" trainset on the San Joaquins at Fresno station in 2012

The Gold Runner service is equipped with Amtrak California's fleet of California Car bi-level, high-capacity passenger cars owned by Caltrans. Each trainset typically consists of two coach cars, a coach/baggage car, a café (food service) car, and a cab/coach car. The cab/coach car is similar to other coaches but with an engineer's operating cab and headlights on one end, allowing the train to be operated in push-pull mode, which eliminates the need to turn the train at each end-point. Each California Car is named for a geographic feature of California — the coaches for rivers, the coach/baggage cars for bays, the cafés for valleys, and the cab/coach cars for mountains. Caltrans is in the process of refitting the cab/coach cars to have a space on the car's lower level for storage for checked luggage and bikes.

Caltrans also owns several second-generation Surfliner bi-level cars that are used on some Gold Runner trainsets. The newer cars look very similar to the California Car fleet, but feature reclining seats, open overhead luggage racks, and a restroom on the upper level of each car. There are several kinds of Surfliner Cars in service on Gold Runner trains: coach cars, cab/baggage/coach cars, and café cars. These follow a similar naming convention as the California Cars, with the Surfliner cafés named for California islands, the coach cars named for beaches, and the cab cars for peninsulas, or "points".

The bi-level fleet is pooled between the Gold Runner and Capitol Corridor routes. The cars have doors which can be operated remotely on either side of the train from a single point of control. This feature allows the operator to maximize passenger flow in boarding and alighting operations, and minimize station dwell time.

=== Comet IB single-level trainsets ===
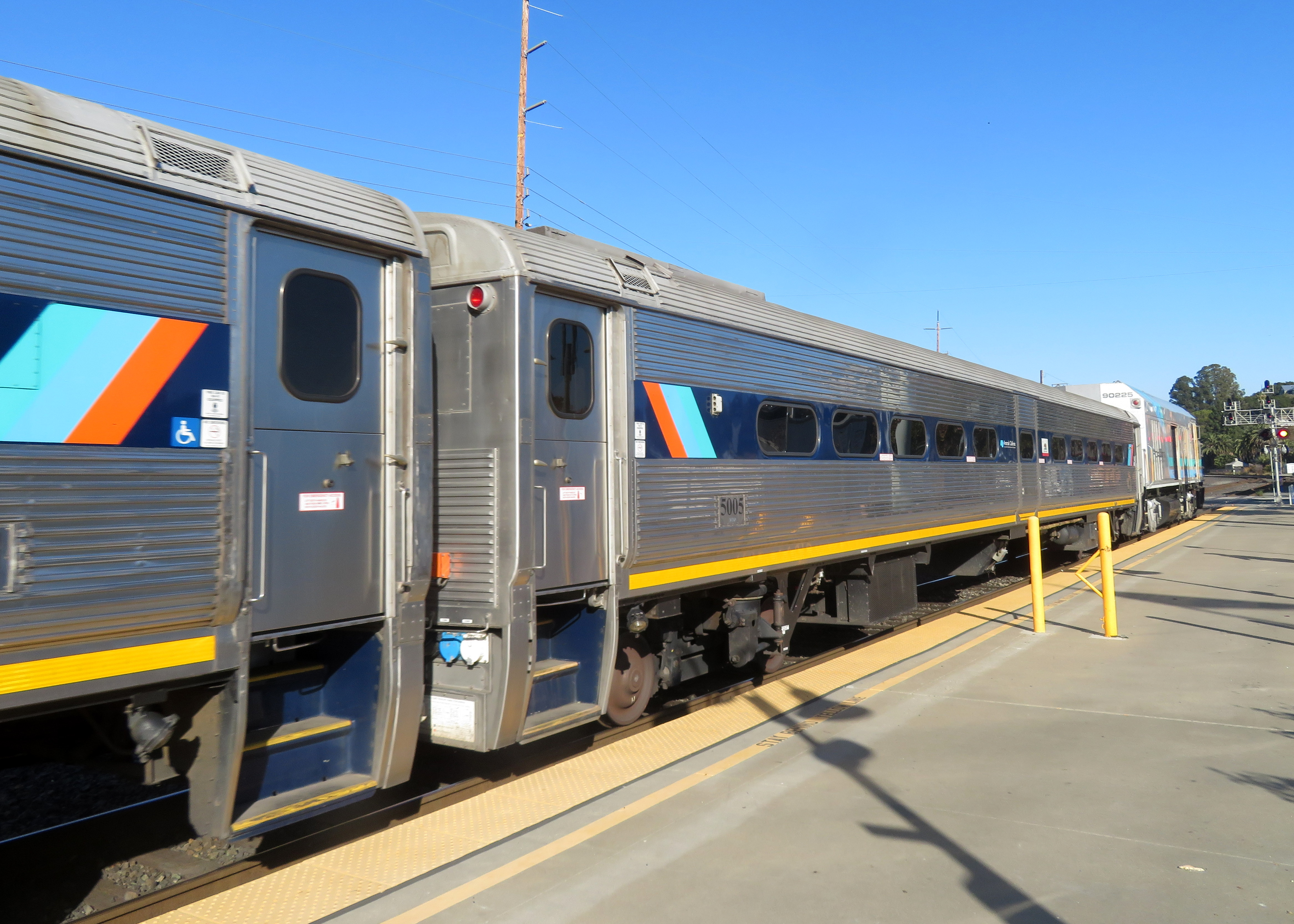
A single-level "Comet car" trainset on the San Joaquins in 2019

Increasing ridership on the San Joaquins service led Caltrans to purchase 14 Comet IB rail cars from New Jersey Transit in 2008 for $75,000 each. The former commuter cars were refurbished and reconfigured by Amtrak's Beech Grove Shops to serve as intercity coaches at a cost of approximately $20 million. The refurbished cars have reclining seats with tray tables and two power outlets for each seat pair; additionally, each car features Wi-Fi, luggage racks, waste receptacles, restrooms, and table seating.

Caltrans had planned to use the Comet trainsets beginning July 2013, but their refurbishment took longer than expected. The first Comet trainset entered revenue service on October 21, 2013, and the second trainset followed on April 15, 2014. The Comet sets replaced two bi-level San Joaquins consists, and the California Cars from these trainsets were then added to the remaining San Joaquins bi-level trains, as well as several Capitol Corridor trains.

Caltrans previously paid to lease three Horizon dinettes, to serve as café cars on Comet trainsets. The Horizon dinettes were returned to Amtrak, as a consequence of service cuts in response to the COVID-19 pandemic, and conductors later offered complimentary snacks and water bottles instead.

Presently, one Comet car has been added to each of the bi-level trainsets on the Gold Runner service, to meet minimum train lengths imposed by BNSF Railway — in this use, the Comet cars do not carry passengers. BNSF requires Gold Runner trains to have a minimum of 28 axles to protect against track circuit malfunctions, an issue known as "loss of shunt." When not properly mitigated, loss of shunt can interfere with the safe operation of block signaling systems, and can prevent grade crossing signals from activating.

Caltrans plans to reassign the Comet cars to services in Southern California after delivery of the Siemens Venture cars is complete. In June 2024, seven of the Comet cars entered service on the Pacific Surfliner.

=== Siemens Venture single-level trainsets ===
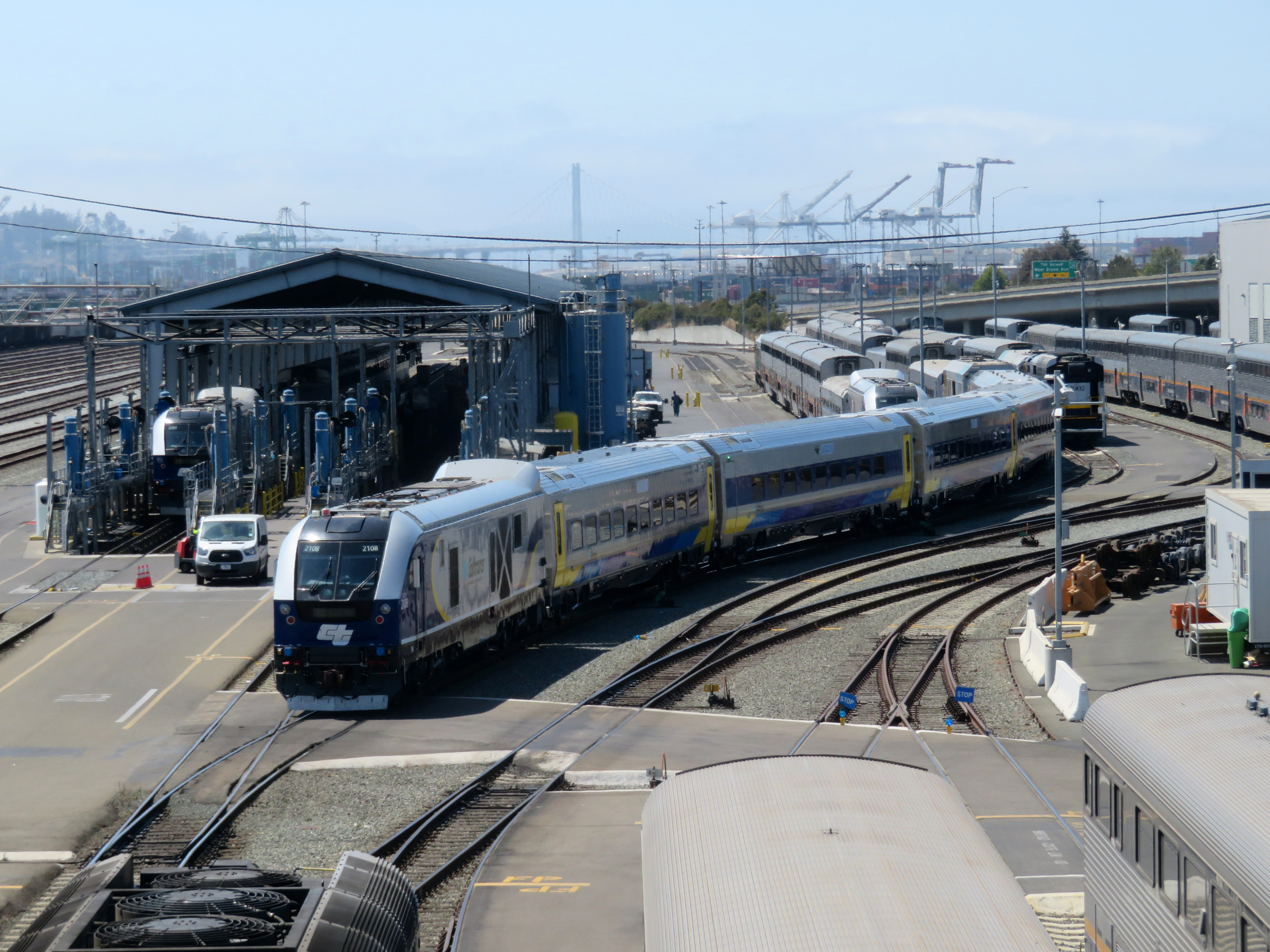
A Siemens Venture test train headed by a Charger SC-44 locomotive

In November 2017, Caltrans announced that it would be ordering seven Siemens Venture trainsets through its contractor Sumitomo Corporation. The state had initially contracted Sumitomo, which in turn subcontracted with Nippon Sharyo, to build the Next Generation Bi-Level Passenger Rail Car, but a prototype car failed a buff strength test in August 2015. After the test failure, Sumitomo canceled its contract with Nippon Sharyo, and turned to Siemens to be the new subcontractor.

A Siemens Venture cab car with SC-44-derived nose

Unlike the bi-level equipment, the Venture cars will be used exclusively on the Gold Runner service. Caltrans has ordered 49 cars, forming seven total trainsets of seven cars each: five coaches, a café car, and one cab-control car with passenger seating and a compartment for checked baggage. The Venture consists are semi-permanently coupled trainsets, which allows for wider gangways between cars — thus providing mobility-impaired passengers access to the entire train. Like the bi-level cars, the Venture trainsets have doors that can be operated remotely on either side of the train from a single point of control. To accommodate the low-level platforms along the line, the Venture cars also have automatically deployed stair steps. These features maximize passenger flow in boarding and alighting operations, and minimize station dwell time.

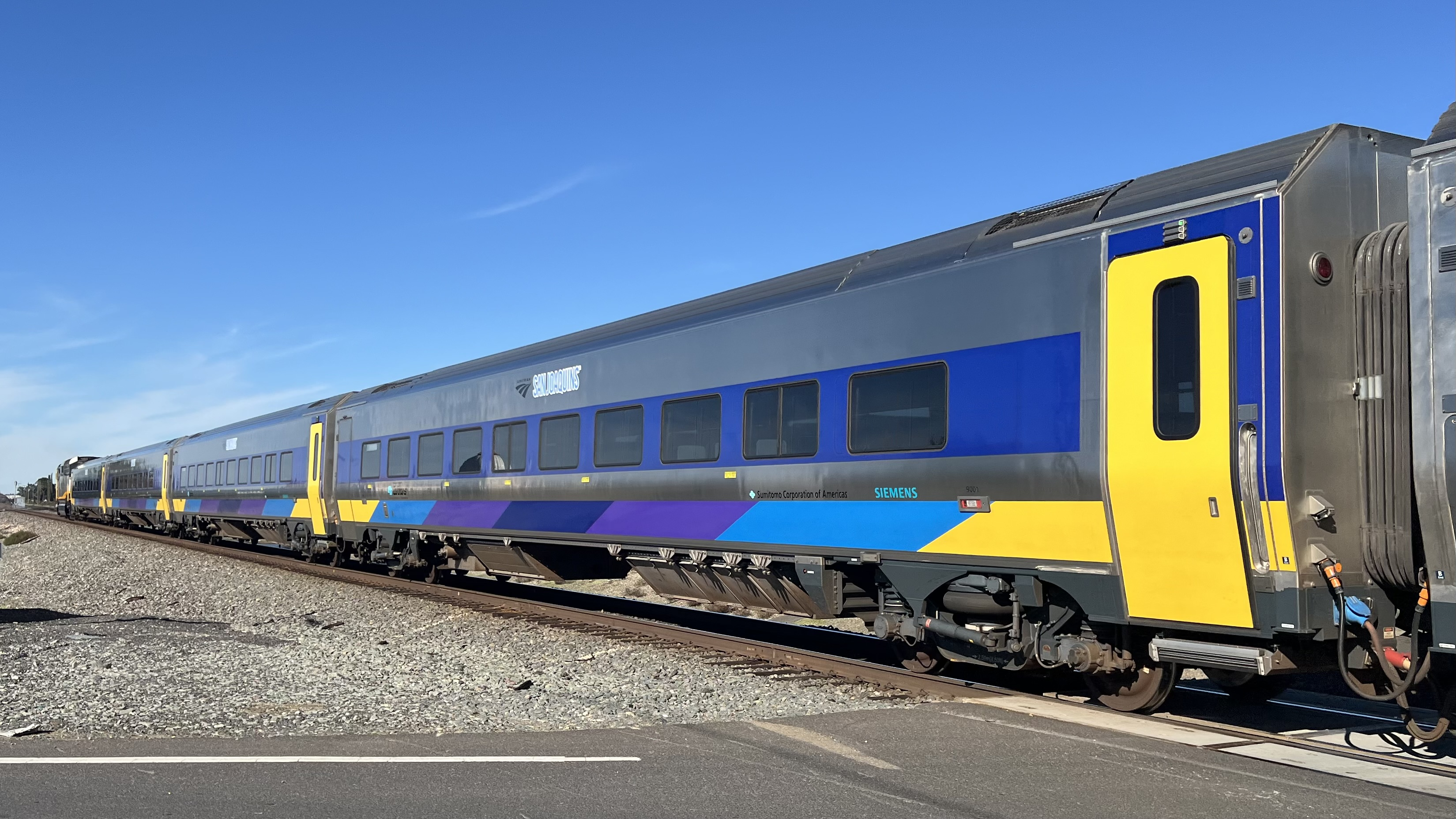
Siemens Venture trainset on the Amtrak San Joaquins route between Modesto and Turlock in 2025

Though the Venture trainsets are designed for use at high-platform stations, all stations on the Gold Runner route have low-platforms; to increase accessibility for mobility-impaired passengers, the SJJPA is exploring the modification of all stations to include two mini-high platforms. These platforms will be short lengths of high platform, each long enough for one Venture vestibule, with an accessible ramp up from the low platform; in conjunction with the mini-high platforms, Caltrans is designing a portable bridge plate to be carried aboard the cars. Additionally, the SJJPA has directed Siemens to procure electrically-operated car-borne wheelchair lifts, to replace the hand-cranked lifts currently utilized by each Gold Runner station.

The first trainset was intended to enter revenue service in 2020, though Caltrans only began accepting deliveries of the new rolling stock in late 2022, and the first set entered service on December 21, 2023. As of 2025, four trainsets — each comprising six coach cars, and either one locomotive and one leased Amtrak NPCU, or two locomotives arranged top-and-tail — rotate through revenue service on the Gold Runner; contingent on the delivery of the cab-control cars, the SJJPA anticipates all seven trainsets to be available for revenue service by mid-2026. The Authority has not yet disclosed a date for the café or cab-control equipment to enter service, though they are investigating the use of unstaffed vending machines to provide food service on their Venture sets; presently, the only food service available on Venture sets are "Snack Stations" — grab-and-go selections of complimentary snacks and beverages.

=== Non-powered control units ===
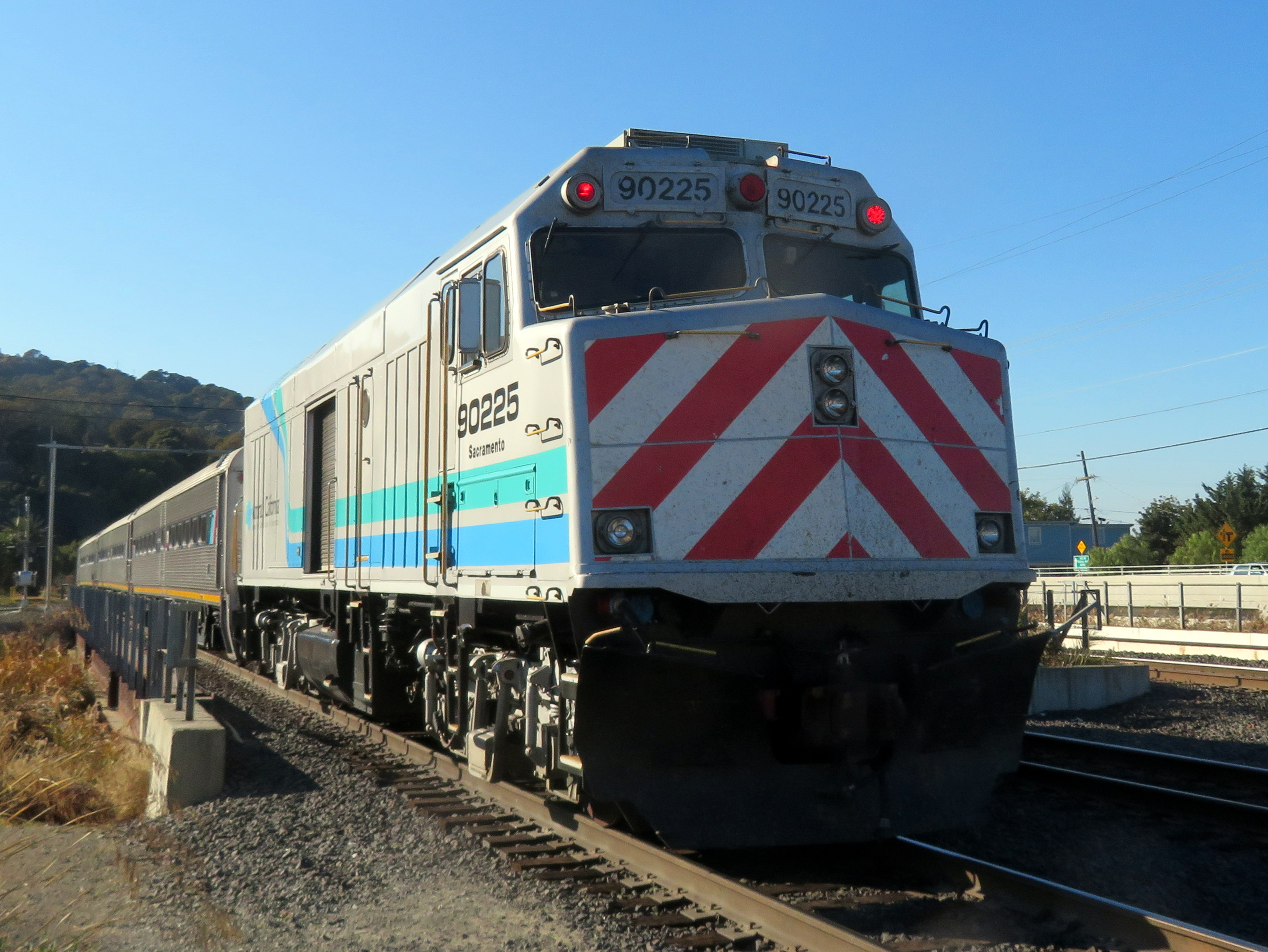
Amtrak NPCU 90225 Sacramento with a Comet trainset, November 2019

In 2013, Caltrans paid Amtrak for the refurbishment of three non-powered control units (NPCUs) from Amtrak, for use on the San Joaquins service. These are ex-EMD F40PH locomotives, which have had their prime movers and traction motors removed, and the control stand in the cab left in place; a floor and retrofitted roll-up side-doors allow for baggage service, leading to the nickname "cabbages" — a portmanteau of "cab" and "baggage". These NPCUs were painted in a striped blue-and-teal livery, reminiscent of a paint scheme formerly used by Caltrain, and each was named for the terminal stations on the San Joaquins route — Bakersfield, Oakland, and Sacramento.

Use of NPCUs allows for push-pull service on Gold Runner trains which do not utilize California or Surfliner bi-level equipment. Previously, the three Caltrans units were used in rotation across two Comet trainsets, but in June of 2024, two were moved to Southern California with seven Comet cars, for service on the Pacific Surfliner. As of 2025, Caltrans leases an additional fourth NPCU from Amtrak, to allow two units to remain in service on the San Joaquins trains which use Siemens Venture equipment.

=== Future Stadler zero-emission multiple-units ===
In September 2022, CalSTA ordered four zero-emission multiple-unit (ZEMU) hydrogen-powered trainsets from Stadler Rail, with delivery expected in early 2027. The trainsets will be used for the Merced–Sacramento portion of the Gold Runner after the first segment of California High-Speed Rail begins service. The order includes an option for 25 additional trainsets for Amtrak California services.
