= Wasco station =

Railway station in Wasco, California

Wasco, CA
- Wasco station in August 2023

General information
- Location: 700 G Street; Wasco, California; United States
- Coordinates: 35°35′39″N 119°19′55″W
- Owner: City of Wasco
- Line: BNSF Bakersfield Subdivision
- Platforms: 1 side platform
- Tracks: 2
- Connections: Kern Regional Transit: 110

Construction
- Parking: Yes
- Accessible: Yes

Other information
- Status: Unstaffed
- Station code: Amtrak: WAC

History
- Opened: October 26, 1975
- Rebuilt: 2006, 2024
- Original company: San Francisco and San Joaquin Valley Railroad

Passengers
- FY 2025: 23,549 (Amtrak)

Services
Preceding station	Amtrak	Following station
Corcoran toward Oakland or Sacramento	Gold Runner	Bakersfield Terminus
Colonel Allensworth State Historic Park (limited service) toward Oakland or Sacramento	Gold Runner	Bakersfield Terminus
Former services
Preceding station	Atchison, Topeka and Santa Fe Railway	Following station
Elmo toward Richmond	Valley Division	Shafter toward Barstow
Location

Wasco station is an Amtrak station on the Gold Runner line located in Wasco, California, United States. The station has one platform on the west side of a single track.

== History ==
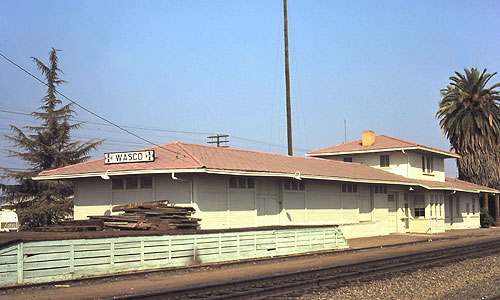
The former station in 1974

When construction of the San Francisco and San Joaquin Valley Railroad (SF&SJ) had reached the future town site, a small, open-air, two story station was constructed. It cost US$4,500 (equivalent to $174,150 in 2025) and followed their standard No. 2 design. There was also a large window, facing the tracks, for the station master to observe activity down the tracks. The town, named Dewey, would develop around the station. It would later be renamed Wasco.

In 1899, the SF&SJ was purchased by the Atchison, Topeka and Santa Fe (part of the Valley Division) which continued to use the station for passenger and freight service. In 1907, the station was extended, to serve a growing demand for freight. In the 1950s, the waiting room was enclosed. The second floor was also reorganized as sleeping quarters.

The station closed in 1971, when Amtrak was formed and none of the routes in the San Joaquin Valley continued to run. In 1974, the San Joaquin route, later renamed the Gold Runner, began operating through the valley. Initially, the train did not stop in Wasco. Amtrak added Wasco as a flag stop on October 26, 1975. The train station was demolished in 1978 and replaced with a couple of benches and a parking lot. Part of the train station would be used in the restoration of the Shafter Santa Fe station.

In August 1980, Wasco was upgraded from a flag stop to a regular stop. On September 21, 2006, an entirely new station opened. It was designed as an open-air station, built in the Spanish Revival style. It would also house the Wasco Chamber of Commerce.

Construction of the Wasco pedestrian underpass, April 2023

The station building was demolished in April 2021 to make way for California High-Speed Rail (HSR), although the Amtrak platform remains in use. A pedestrian underpass connecting the corner of G and 7th streets to the platform was constructed beneath the planned high-speed rail alignment. The 58-foot-long (18 m), 15-foot-wide (4.6 m) underpass includes stairways and wheelchair ramps and opened in March 2024.

Wasco is not planned to have a station on the HSR system. City officials have expressed concern that the introduction of high-speed rail service could result in the discontinuation of Amtrak service to the city. The Gold Runner service is expected to cease stopping in Wasco once high-speed rail operations begin.
