= Hanford station =

Railway station in Hanford, California, US

Hanford, CA
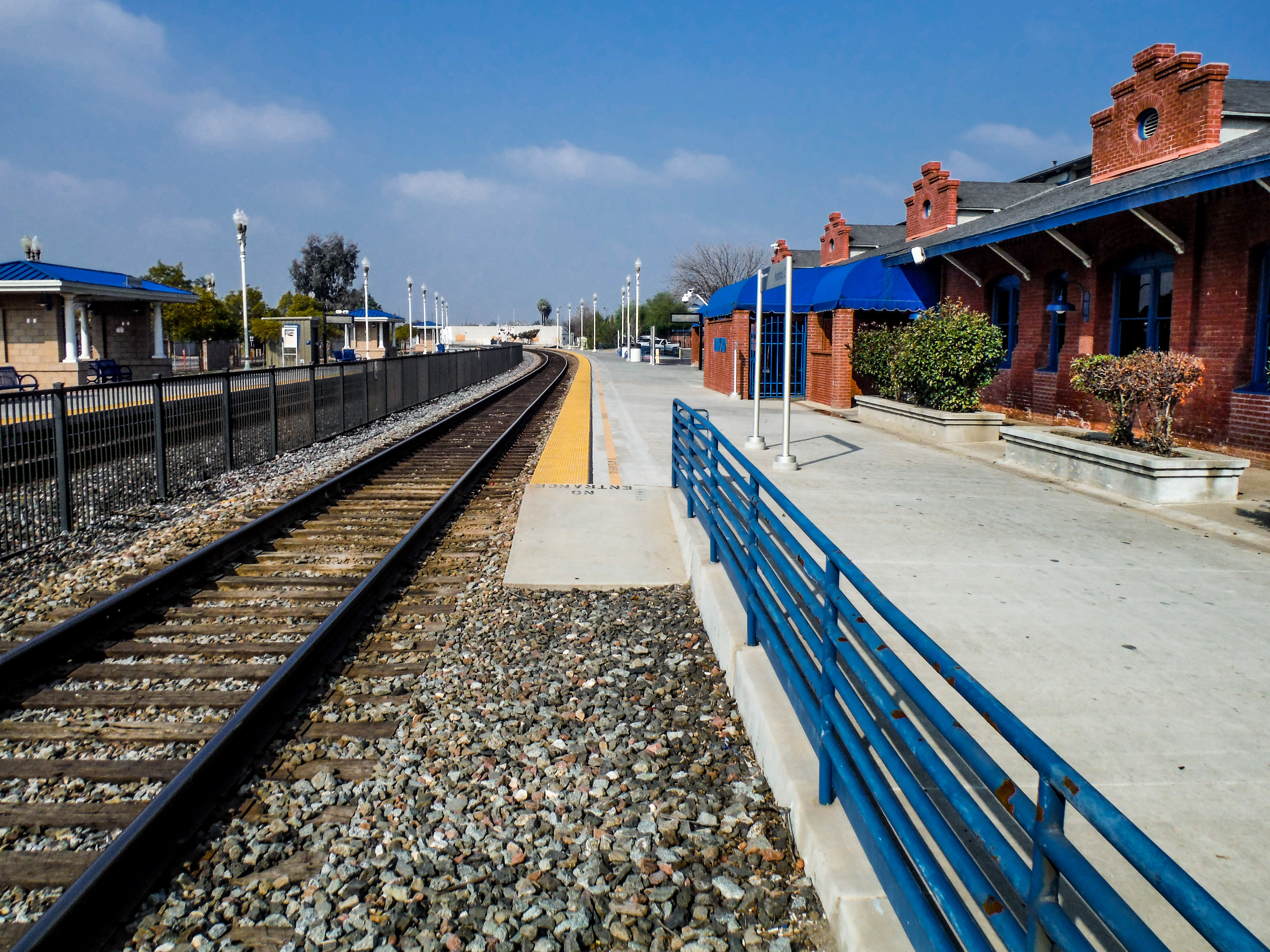
- Hanford station, January 2015

General information
- Location: 200 Santa Fe Avenue; Hanford, California; United States
- Coordinates: 36.3261°N 119.6519°W
- Owner: City of Hanford, BNSF Railway
- Line: BNSF Bakersfield Subdivision
- Platforms: 2 side platforms
- Tracks: 2
- Connections: Amtrak Thruway: 18; Greyhound Lines; Kings Area Regional Transit: 1, 2, 3, 4, 5, 6, 7, 8, 9, 12, 13, 14, 15, 17, 20

Construction
- Parking: Yes
- Accessible: Yes

Other information
- Status: Staffed, checked baggage service available
- Station code: Amtrak: HNF

History
- Opened: 1897, 1974
- Closed: May 1, 1971
- Rebuilt: 1991
- Original company: San Francisco and San Joaquin Valley Railroad

Passengers
- FY 2025: 121,136 (Amtrak)

Services
Preceding station	Amtrak	Following station
Fresno toward Oakland or Sacramento	Gold Runner	Corcoran toward Bakersfield
Former services
Preceding station	Atchison, Topeka and Santa Fe Railway	Following station
Banner toward Richmond	Valley Division	Guernsey toward Barstow
Location

Hanford station is a train station in Hanford, California served by Amtrak. The station also services the larger city of Visalia, California, 20 miles (32 km) to the east.

== History ==
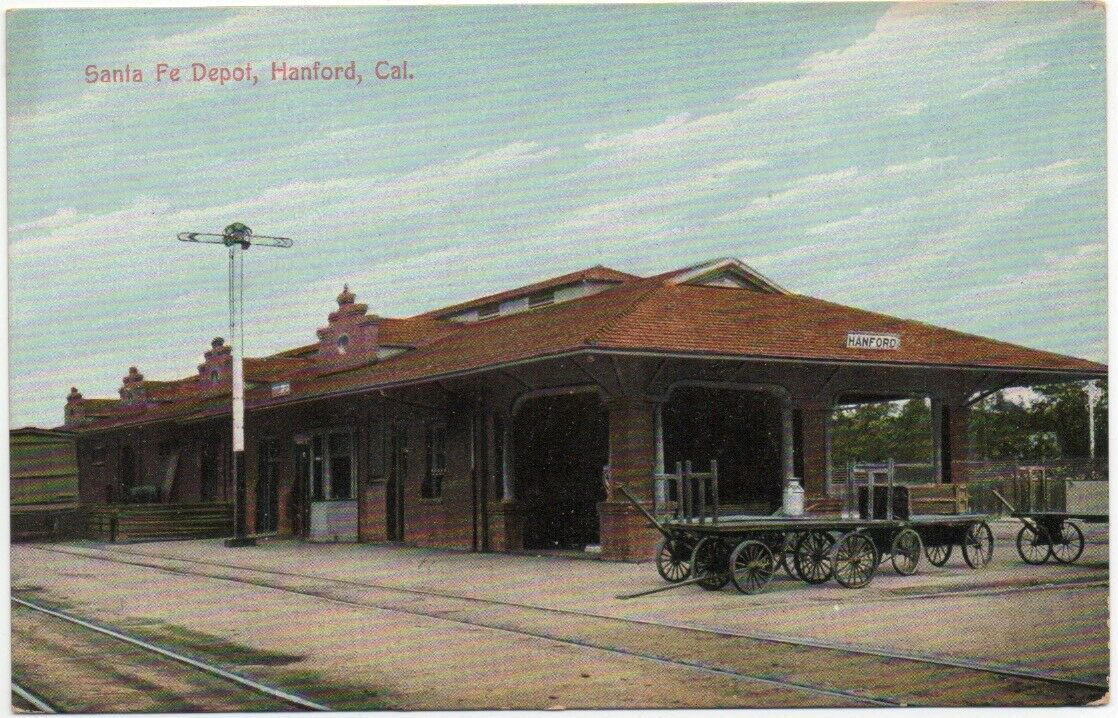
Hanford station in 1910

It was built by the San Francisco and San Joaquin Valley Railroad in 1897 and is one of only three SF&SJV stations left in existence. Service by the Santa Fe Railroad ended on May 1, 1971; Amtrak service began in 1974.

In the early 1990s, the city sponsored a rehabilitation of the depot that included rebuilding the former freight section and enclosing the outdoor waiting room. A wide, curving canopy was added to the trackside façade to provide travelers with better protection from the sun and rain. Interior modifications resulted in a new layout that added office and commercial space.

In 2006, the city moved forward with $1.5 million in improvements to the adjacent bus bays that accommodate local and regional service provided by the Kings Area Regional Transit (KART) system. A c. 1880s Southern Pacific wooden freight depot was moved to the site to provide a waiting room and ticket desk for bus passengers.

Gold Runner trains are expected to cease services here once California High-Speed Rail operations begin.
