= Shafter station (Atchison, Topeka and Santa Fe Railway) =

- Santa Fe Passenger and Freight Depot
- U.S. National Register of Historic Places
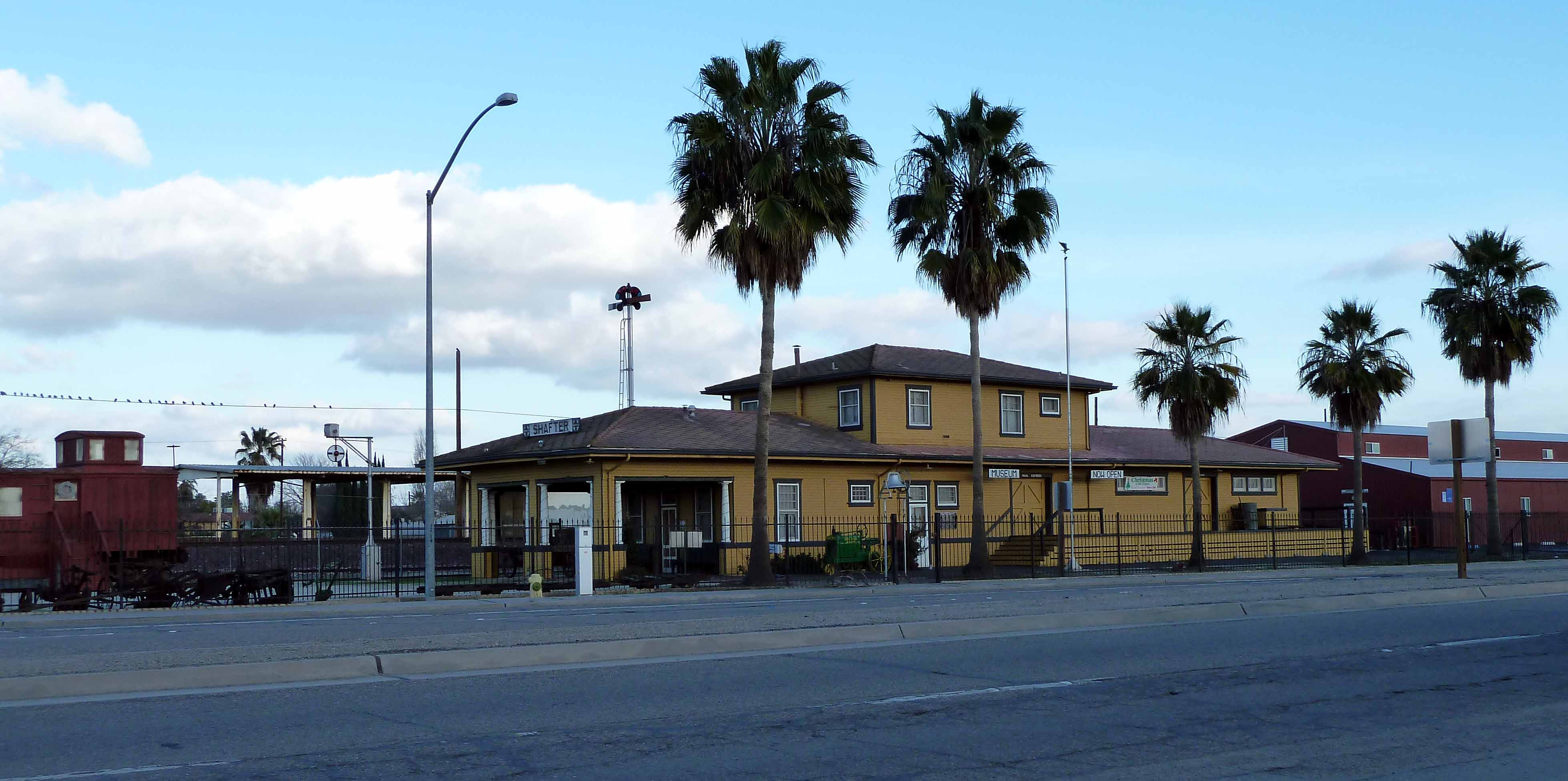

- Location within California Location within the United States
- Location: 150 Central Valley Hwy., Shafter, California
- Coordinates: 35°30′18″N 119°16′35″W
- Area: 0.8 acres (0.32 ha)
- Built: 1917
- Built by: Santa Fe Railroad
- Architectural style: Standard Combination Frame
- NRHP reference No.: 82002187
- Added to NRHP: January 19, 1982

The Santa Fe Passenger and Freight Depot is a former Santa Fe Railroad station located at 150 Central Valley Highway in Shafter, in the southern San Joaquin Valley within Kern County, California.

== History ==
The San Francisco and San Joaquin Valley Railroad was built in the late 1890s and later became the Valley Division of the Santa Fe.

The station was built in 1917 to serve Shafter, which was at the time a small farming community.

The building's design followed the "standard combination freight depot" Number 2-A plan developed by Santa Fe Railroad engineers in 1911. The design originally included a porch supported by columns, a ticket office, a waiting room, a freight room, and a baggage room.

In 1938, the porch was enclosed and became the new waiting room so the inside of the station could be used for office space, which was needed to handle increased freight service.

The Santa Fe Railroad closed the station in 1978.

== Museum ==
The Santa Fe Railroad donated the station to the Shafter Historical Society in 1979 which relocated it in 1980. The station now functions as the historical society's Shafter Depot Museum.

The depot was added to the National Register of Historic Places on January 19, 1982.

== See also ==
- Atchison, Topeka and Santa Fe Railway stations in Kern County, California
- California Historical Landmarks in Kern County, California
- National Register of Historic Places listings in Kern County, California

Preceding station	Atchison, Topeka and Santa Fe Railway	Following station
Wasco toward Richmond	Valley Division	Bakersfield toward Barstow
