= Angiola, California =

Unincorporated community in California, United States

- Unincorporated community
- Location within California Location within the United States
- Coordinates: 35°59′21″N 119°28′33″W
- Country: United States
- State: California
- County: Tulare
- Elevation: 203 ft (62 m)
- Time zone: UTC-8 (Pacific (PST))
  - Summer (DST): UTC-7 (PDT)
- Area code: 559
- GNIS feature ID: 1660253

Angiola is an unincorporated community in Tulare County, California, United States. Angiola is located on California State Route 43, 13 miles (21 km) west-northwest of Earlimart, along the route of the San Francisco and San Joaquin Valley Railroad, which became part of the Atchison, Topeka and Santa Fe Railway Valley Division. The community was named after Angela Bacigalupi, wife of a landowner there. Angiola had a post office from 1898 to 1927.
