= San Francisco and San Joaquin Valley Railroad =

Short lived railroad from Stockton to Bakersfield (1895-1898)

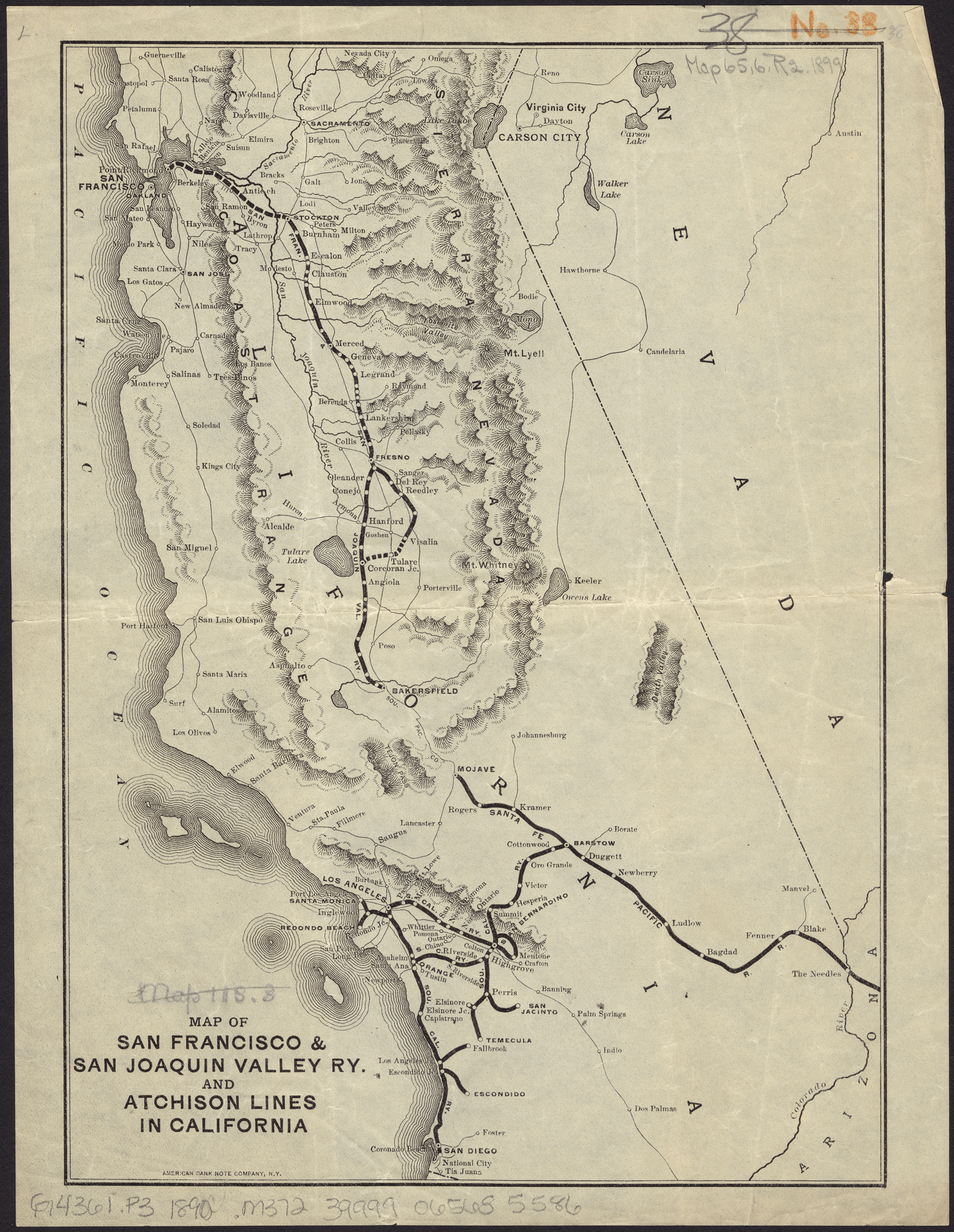
Solid line shows rail route from Stockton to Bakersfield.

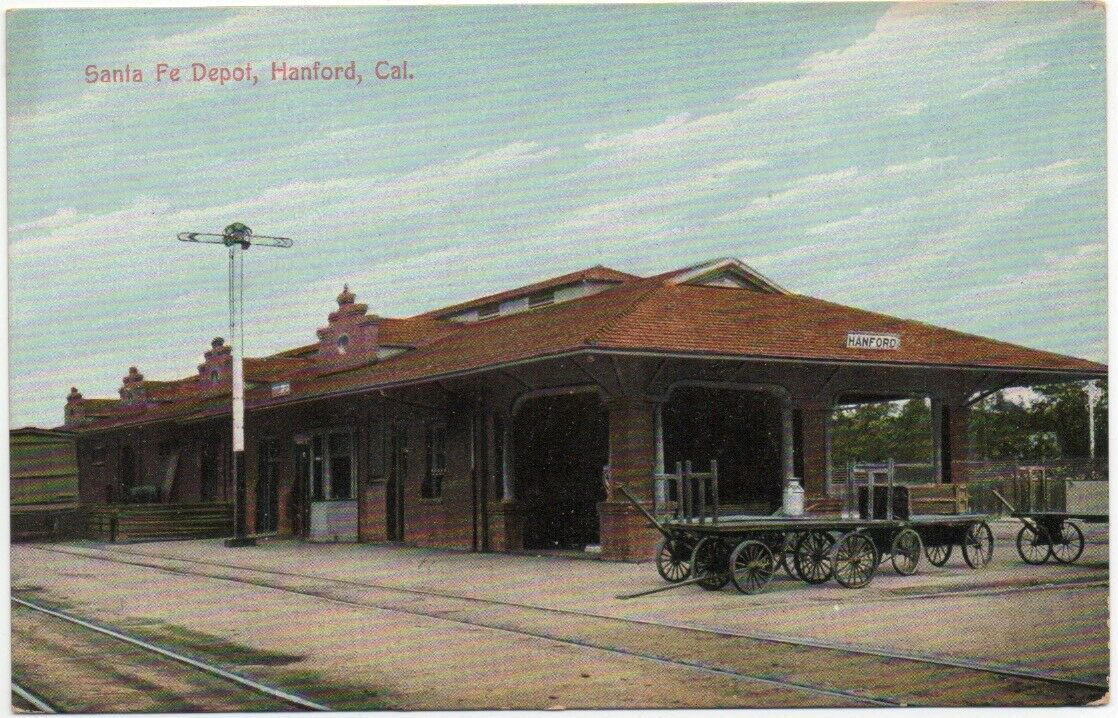
Hanford station in 1910

The San Francisco and San Joaquin Valley Railroad was a California rail line between Stockton and Bakersfield constructed in the late 1890s and very shortly thereafter purchased by the Atchison, Topeka and Santa Fe Railroad and became their Valley Division.

The impetus for building the line was the monopoly position of the Southern Pacific Railroad, it being thought that a competitor would lower the prices being charged to farmers to ship their crops to San Francisco. Claus Spreckels, a leading sugar manufacturer, pledged $500,000 for the building of the line in January 1895, if $3,000,000 more could be raised. Many small investors contributed funds, giving it the nickname the "People's Railroad". The line was constructed between 1895 and 1898. The first passenger train from Stockton to Fresno ran on October 5, 1896, to great fanfare. Bakersfield also held a big celebration when it was reached on May 27, 1898. In both cases, news reports trumpeted how the towns were now free of the "tyranny" of Southern Pacific's monopoly.

The quick sale to the Santa Fe before the end of 1898 disappointed many, but many backers believed combining with a larger partner was key to the line's success.

The line still exists today as BNSF's Stockton Subdivision from Richmond to Fresno, and as the Bakersfield Subdivision from Fresno to Bakersfield. The Gold Runner runs along this route.

== Stations ==
Stations from north to south included the following stops:

- Richmond
- Luzon. Named during the Spanish-American War, when place names from the Philippines were very popular. Now located near Hercules.
- Pinole
- Glen Frazer
- Muir Station (Martinez)
- Bay Point
- Pittsburg
- Antioch
- Stockton (San Joaquin Street station)
- Burnham
- Escalon
- Riverbank
- Empire
- Hughson
- Elmwood
- Merced station
- Geneva
- Le Grand
- Marguerite
- Sharon
- Miller
- Lankershim
- Patterson
- Greenleaf
- Fresno
- Oleander
- Conejo
- Hanford station
- Corcoran station
- Angiola
- Kernell
- Elmo
- Wasco station
- Shafter
- Rosedale
- Bakersfield station
