= Tehachapi Loop =

Rail line spiral between the Central Valley and Mojave Desert

Coordinates: 35°12′03″N 118°32′13″W

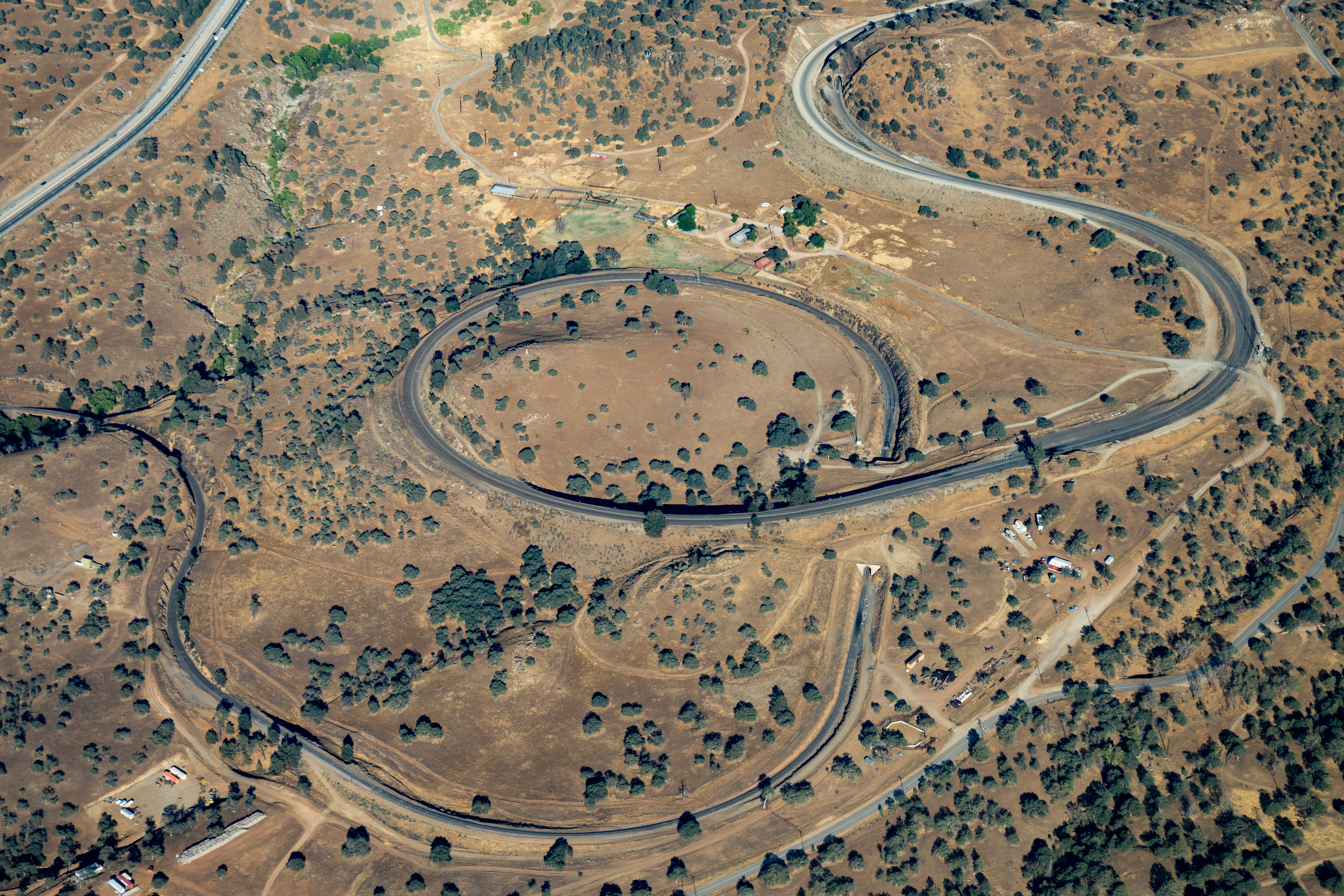
Aerial overview of the Tehachapi Loop in 2022

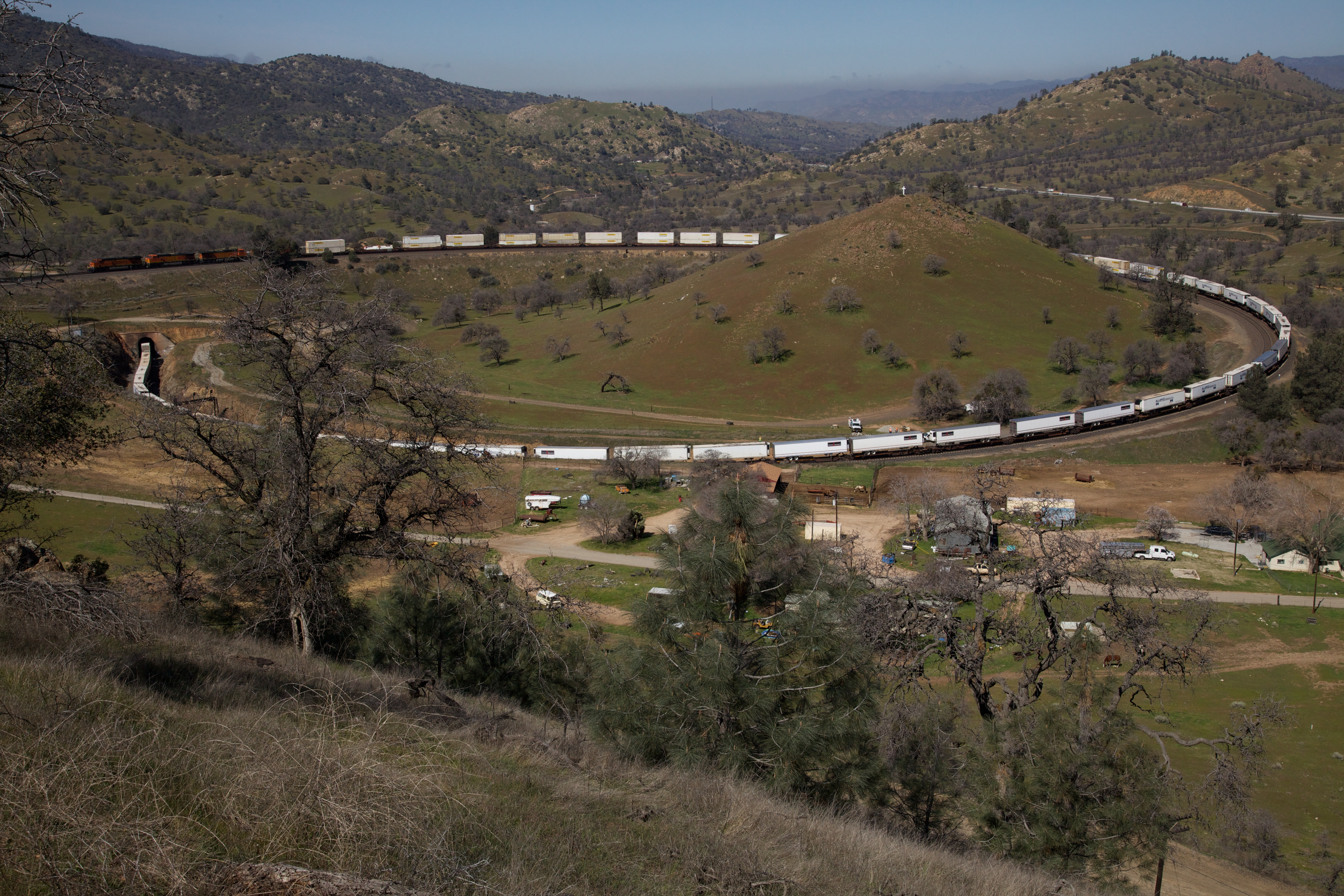
BNSF train on Tehachapi Loop in 2011, with mixed trailer-on-flatcar and double-stack container manifest

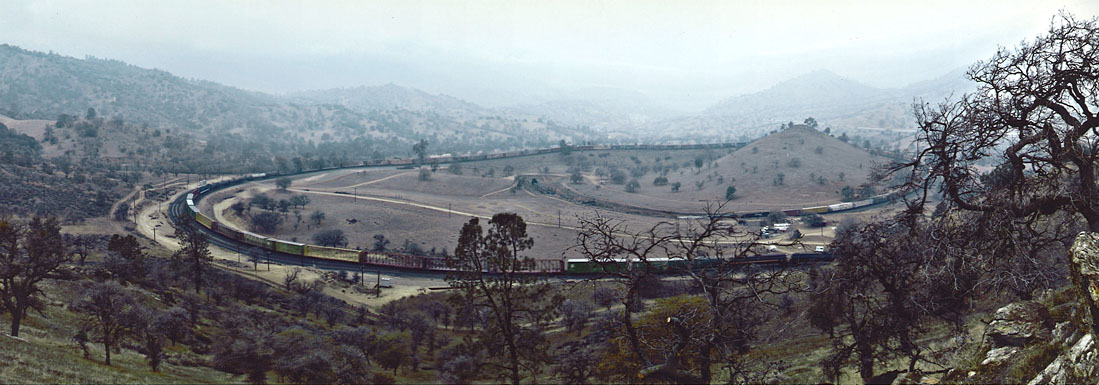
A panoramic view of the Tehachapi Loop looking north-west

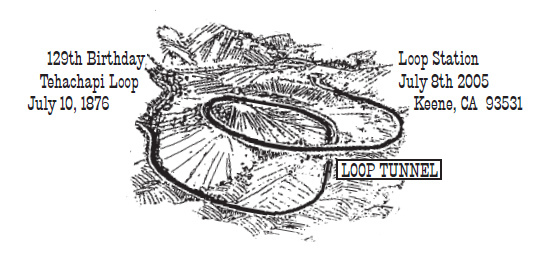
Pictorial cancellation from the Keene Post Office celebrating the Loop's 129th anniversary

The Tehachapi Loop is a 3,779-foot-long (0.72 mi; 1.15 km) rail spiral (or helix) on the Union Pacific Railroad's Mojave Subdivision through the Tehachapi Pass in the Tehachapi Mountains in Kern County, south-central California. The line connects Bakersfield and the San Joaquin Valley to the town of Mojave in the Mojave Desert.

Rising at a steady two-percent grade, the track gains 77 feet (23 m) in elevation and makes a 1,210-foot-diameter (370 m) circle. Any train that is more than 3,800 feet (1,200 m) long—about 56 boxcars—passes over itself going around the loop. At the bottom of the loop, the track passes through Tunnel 9, the ninth tunnel built as the railroad was extended from Bakersfield.

The line averages about 36 freight trains each day. Passenger trains such as Amtrak's Gold Runner are banned from the loop, although the Coast Starlight can use it as a detour. Its frequent trains and scenic setting make the Tehachapi Loop popular with railfans. In 1998, it was named a National Historic Civil Engineering Landmark. It is also designated as California Historical Landmark #508.

== History ==
One of the engineering feats of its day, the Loop was built by Southern Pacific Railroad to ease the grade over Tehachapi Pass. Construction began in 1874, and the line opened in 1876. Contributors to the project's construction include Arthur De Wint Foote and the project's chief engineer, William Hood.

The siding on the loop is known as Walong after Southern Pacific District Roadmaster W. A. Long.

The project was constructed under the leadership of Southern Pacific's civil engineers, James R. Strobridge and William Hood, using a predominantly Chinese labor force. The Tehachapi line necessitated 18 tunnels, 10 bridges, and numerous water towers to replenish steam locomotives. Between 1875 and 1876, about 3,000 Chinese workers equipped with little more than hand tools, picks, shovels, horse-drawn carts and blasting powder cut through solid and decomposed granite to create the helix-shaped 0.72-mile (1.16 km) loop with grades averaging about 2.2 percent and an elevation gain of 77 feet (23 m). In 1882, the line was extended through Southern California and the Mojave Desert with 8,000 Chinese men working under Strobridge and another man.

In the 1990s, the tunnels were modified to enable double-stack intermodal trains to use the loop.

In 1991, Santa Fe 3751 pulled her first train over the loop on December 29 and 30 after her restoration on August 13 of the same year. The train was a round trip from December 27 to December 31, and was a 16 car consist with two EMD FP45s acting as helper Locomotives. The train was titled The California Limited since the trip occurred on the 99th anniversary of the train. The trip was from Los Angeles Union Station to Bakersfield station.

Between 2013 and 2020, upgrades were made to increase the number of double-track segments and to improve railway sidings, resulting in increased traffic capacity and the ability to host longer trains.

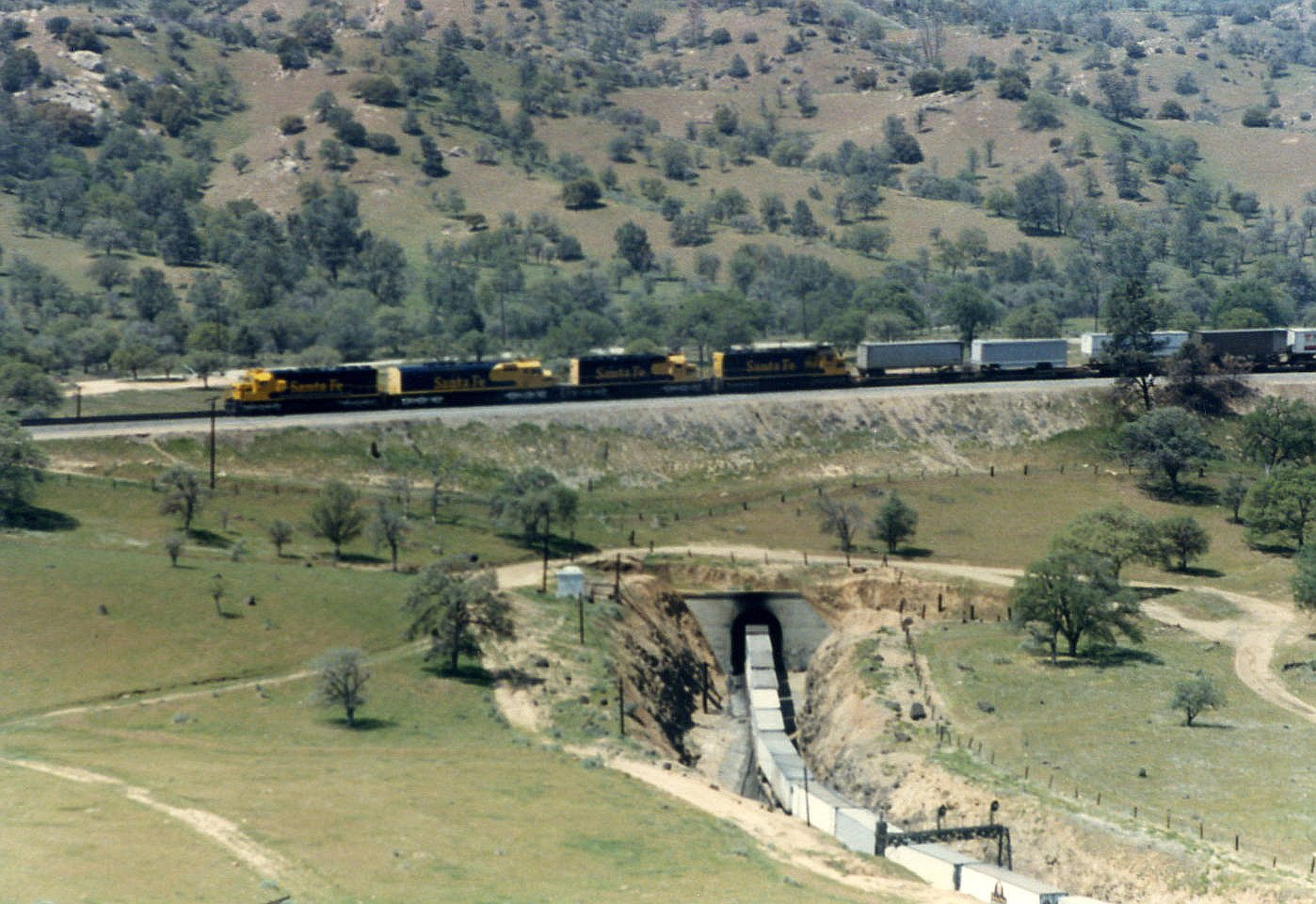
An eastbound Santa Fe train passes over itself on the loop in April 1987

== Operations ==
The Loop became the property of the Union Pacific Railroad in 1996, when the Union Pacific and Southern Pacific systems merged. Trains of the BNSF Railway also use the loop under trackage rights. As of 2025, BNSF operates about 20 trains through the Loop per day, while Union Pacific sends about 16 trains daily.

Although Southern Pacific ran passenger trains on the Loop for years, it banned passenger service there soon after handing its trains to Amtrak in 1971. Union Pacific has maintained the ban since taking over Southern Pacific. As a result, Amtrak's Gold Runner train is unable to directly serve Los Angeles until a bypass is constructed or the United States federal government or the California State Legislature compel the railroad to allow passenger service to resume. Amtrak operates Amtrak Thruway buses for passengers wanting to travel between the Central Valley and Los Angeles. An exception is made for the Coast Starlight, which uses the line as a detour if its normal route is closed.

== Recognition and access ==
A concrete viewing platform was constructed at the scenic overlook on Woodford-Tehachapi Road in the summer of 2021, allowing railroad enthusiasts to watch trains on the loop at a safe distance from the winding, two-lane roadway.

The Tehachapi Depot Museum is located in the nearby town of Tehachapi.

The California Historical Landmark plaque reads:

NO. 508 TEHACHAPI LOOP - From this spot may be seen a portion of the world-renowned Loop completed in 1876 under the direction of William Hood, Southern Pacific railroad engineer. In gaining elevation around the central hill of the Loop, a 4,000-foot train will cross 77 feet above its rear cars in the tunnel below.

A large white cross, "The Cross at the Loop", stands atop the hill in the center of the loop in memory of two Southern Pacific Railroad employees killed on May 12, 1989, in a train derailment in San Bernardino, California.

== See also ==
- Williams Loop — another loop in California
- California Historical Landmarks in Kern County
- California Historical Landmark
