= Stockton Subdivision =

Railroad line in California

The Stockton Subdivision is an American railroad line that runs from the San Francisco Bay to Fresno, California.

== Route ==
The Stockton Subdivion is in the U.S. state of California and owned by the BNSF Railway. It runs from the Port of Richmond, where trains interchange with the Richmond Pacific Railroad, to Fresno where the railway continues south as the Bakersfield Subdivision or the Union Pacific Fresno Subdivision. The line was originally constructed by the San Francisco and San Joaquin Valley Railroad in the late 1890s before being acquired by the Atchison, Topeka and Santa Fe Railway and becoming its Valley Subdivision.

The Santa Fe previously continued south to Oakland on the former California and Nevada Railroad. The line between Richmond and Oakland was abandoned by the Santa Fe in the early 1980s when the Santa Fe obtained trackage rights into Oakland via Southern Pacific Railroad's parallel line to the west.

BNSF spent $17.5 million to upgrade track, bridges, and crossings along the line in 2005.

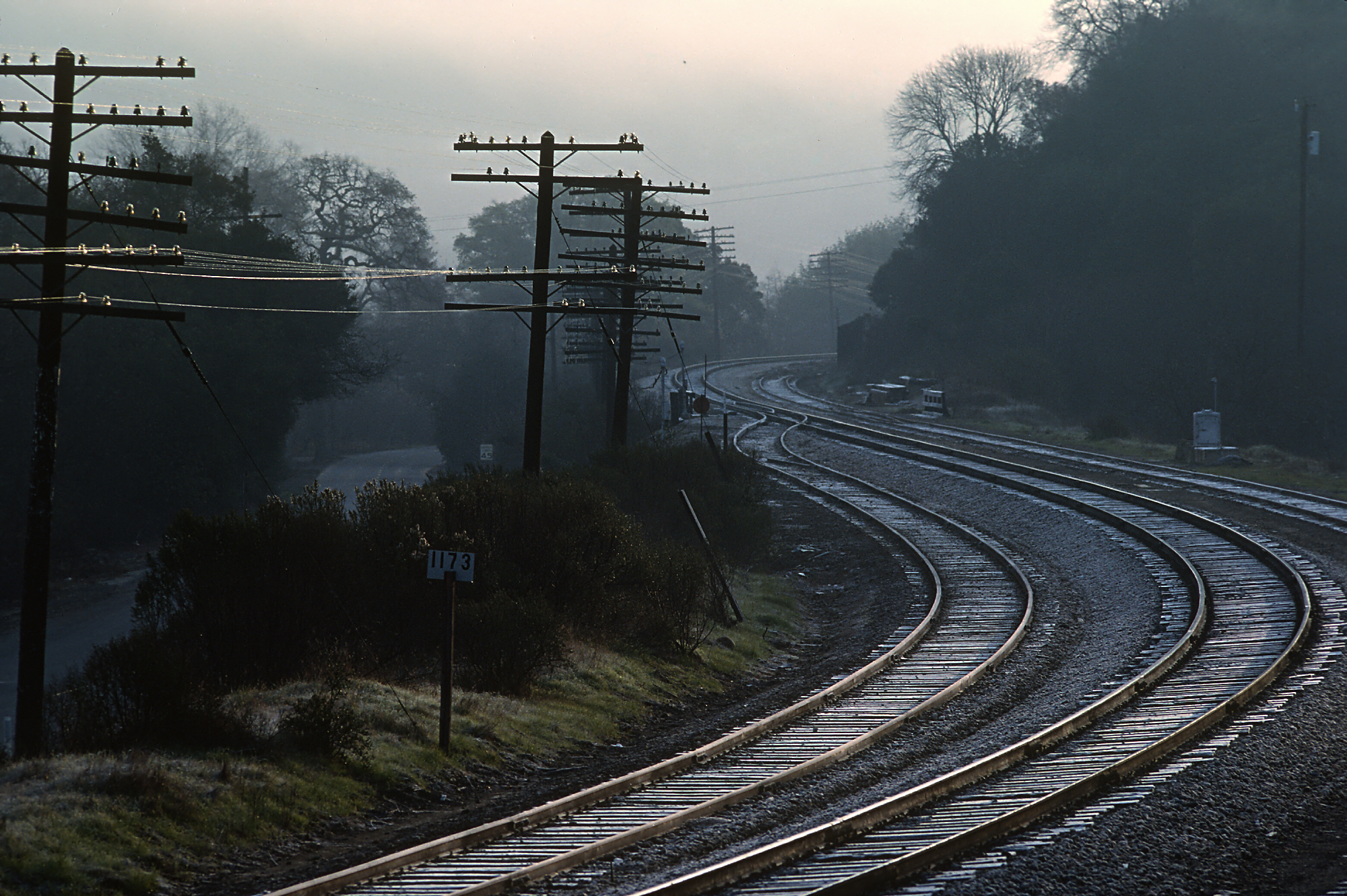
Stockton Subdivision tracks in Franklin Canyon, February 1985

Amtrak Gold Runner trains operate over the line from Bakersfield to Port Chicago. Part of the right of way in and around Madera is planned to be utilized for the California High-Speed Rail line. Dispatching is carried out at the Regional Operations Center in San Bernardino.

== 2006 Kismet Collsion ==
On June 14, 2006, at 5:51 am, two BNSF trains with #4059 and #4479 collided at the Kismet siding near Madera, injuring 5 people. The collision has footage of the crash inside the BNSF #4479 train, which is widely available on YouTube.
