= TransitAmerica Services =

Commuter rail operator

TransitAmerica Services, Inc.
- Company type: Subsidiary
- Founded: May 13, 2005
- Headquarters: St Joseph, Missouri, United States
- Parent: Herzog Transit Services
- Website: Herzog TransitAmerica

TransitAmerica Services, Inc. is an American passenger rail service provider headquartered in St Joseph, Missouri. The company was established in 2002 as a joint venture between Herzog Transit Services and Stagecoach Group. In 2004, Herzog bought out Stagecoach, and the company became a wholly owned subsidiary of Herzog Transit Services.

== Corporate history ==
In November 2002, Herzog Transit Services and Stagecoach Group announced a corporate partnership to form TransitAmerica. In 2004, Stagecoach transferred its interest in the partnership to Herzog. On May 13, 2005, TransitAmerica was officially incorporated in the state of Missouri.

== California ==
In September 2011, Caltrain awarded TransitAmerica a contract to operate the system starting on May 26, 2012. The contract was for five years with five one-year options. In January 2021, Caltrain extended the contract to run through June 30, 2027.

The San Joaquin Joint Powers Authority selected TransitAmerica for maintenance of cars and locomotives on Amtrak California’s Gold Runner in 2025.

== CTrail ==
CTrail Hartford Line trains are currently operated by TransitAmerica Services and Alternate Concepts Inc., operating as a joint venture, under a 5-year, $45 million contract.
