= Corcoran station =

Amtrak train station in California, US

Corcoran, CA
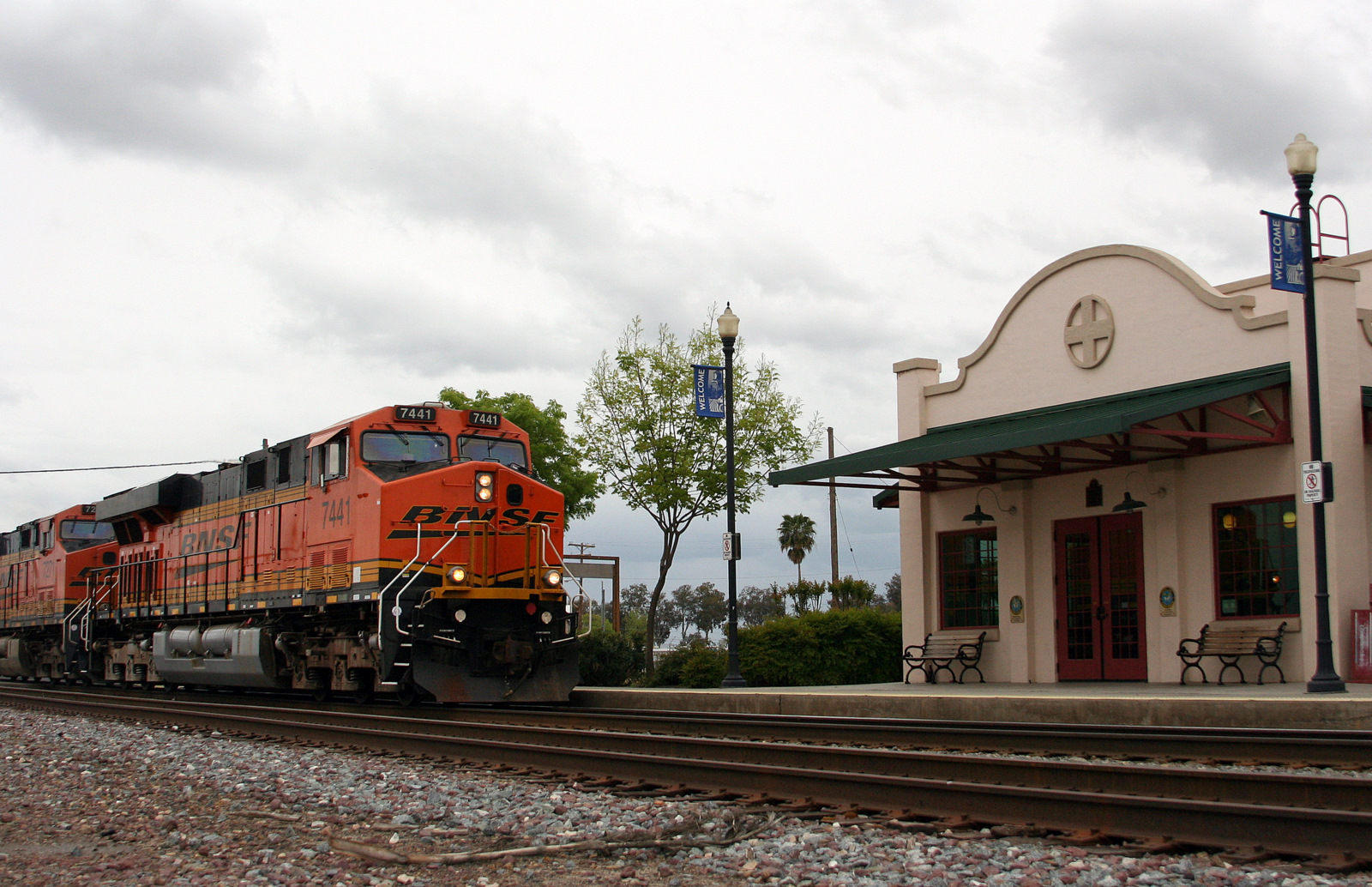
- A BNSF freight train passes Corcoran station in 2010

General information
- Location: 1099 Otis Avenue; Corcoran, California; United States
- Coordinates: 36.0984°N 119.5571°W
- Owner: City of Corcoran
- Line: BNSF Bakersfield Subdivision
- Platforms: 1 side platform
- Tracks: 2
- Connections: Corcoran Area Transit; KART: 13

Construction
- Parking: Yes
- Accessible: Yes

Other information
- Status: Unstaffed
- Station code: Amtrak: COC

History
- Opened: 1907 (ATSF); July 29, 1989 (Amtrak)
- Rebuilt: 1999

Passengers
- FY 2025: 21,981 (Amtrak)

Services
Preceding station	Amtrak	Following station
Hanford toward Oakland or Sacramento	Gold Runner	Wasco toward Bakersfield
Hanford toward Oakland or Sacramento	Gold Runner	Colonel Allensworth State Historic Park (limited service) toward Bakersfield
Former services
Preceding station	Atchison, Topeka and Santa Fe Railway	Following station
Guernsey toward Richmond	Valley Division	Angiola toward Barstow
Waukena toward Fresno	Corcoran – Fresno	Terminus
Location

Corcoran station is an Amtrak train station in Corcoran, California, United States.

== History ==
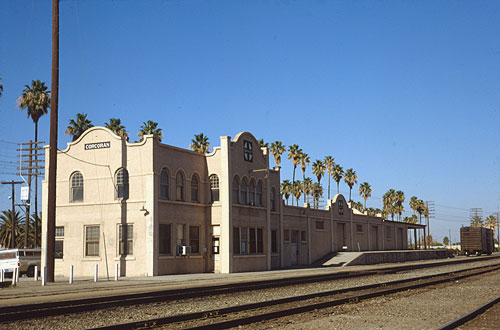
The former station in 1979

Corcoran was made a scheduled stop on the Amtrak San Joaquin on July 29, 1989.

The current station building, opened in 1999, replaced a former Atchison, Topeka and Santa Fe Railway depot from 1907 that was demolished in 1998. It exhibits Spanish Revival style architecture that includes decorative curvilinear gables and stuccoed walls. The depot is decorated with a large bas-relief called “Life of the Valley" depicting the importance of water to the residents, agriculture, and wildlife of the San Joaquin Valley. Artist Garrett Masterson completed it with the help of his students at the nearby California State Prison, Corcoran.

Gold Runner trains are expected to cease services here once California High-Speed Rail operations begin.
