= Lodi station (Altamont Corridor Express) =

Proposed train station in California, United States

Lodi

General information
- Location: Highway 12; Lodi, California
- Coordinates: 38°07′00″N 121°21′30″W
- Line: UP Sacramento Subdivision

Other information
- Status: construction planning

History
- Opening: 2027

Future service
Preceding station	Amtrak	Following station
Elk Grove toward Natomas/Sacramento Airport	Gold Runner	Stockton–Downtown toward Bakersfield or Oakland
Preceding station	Altamont Corridor Express	Following station
Elk Grove toward Natomas/Sacramento Airport	San Jose – Natomas	Stockton toward San Jose
Elk Grove toward Natomas/Sacramento Airport	Valley Rail	Stockton toward Ceres
Elk Grove toward Natomas/Sacramento Airport	Union City – Natomas Opening 2030	Stockton toward Union City
Location
- Location within California Location within the United States

Lodi station is a planned railway station near Lodi, California. It is located along the Union Pacific Sacramento Subdivision on the west side of town, on Highway 12 near Devries Road. The station is part of the Valley Rail project, which aims to increase transportation options in the San Joaquin Valley. It is expected to open in 2027. In planning, there was an option for this station to be located further south near the crossing at Harney Lane. Lodi Transit Center, more centrally located in Lodi, is about 6 miles (9.7 km) to the east.
