= Bakersfield Subdivision =

Railway line in California

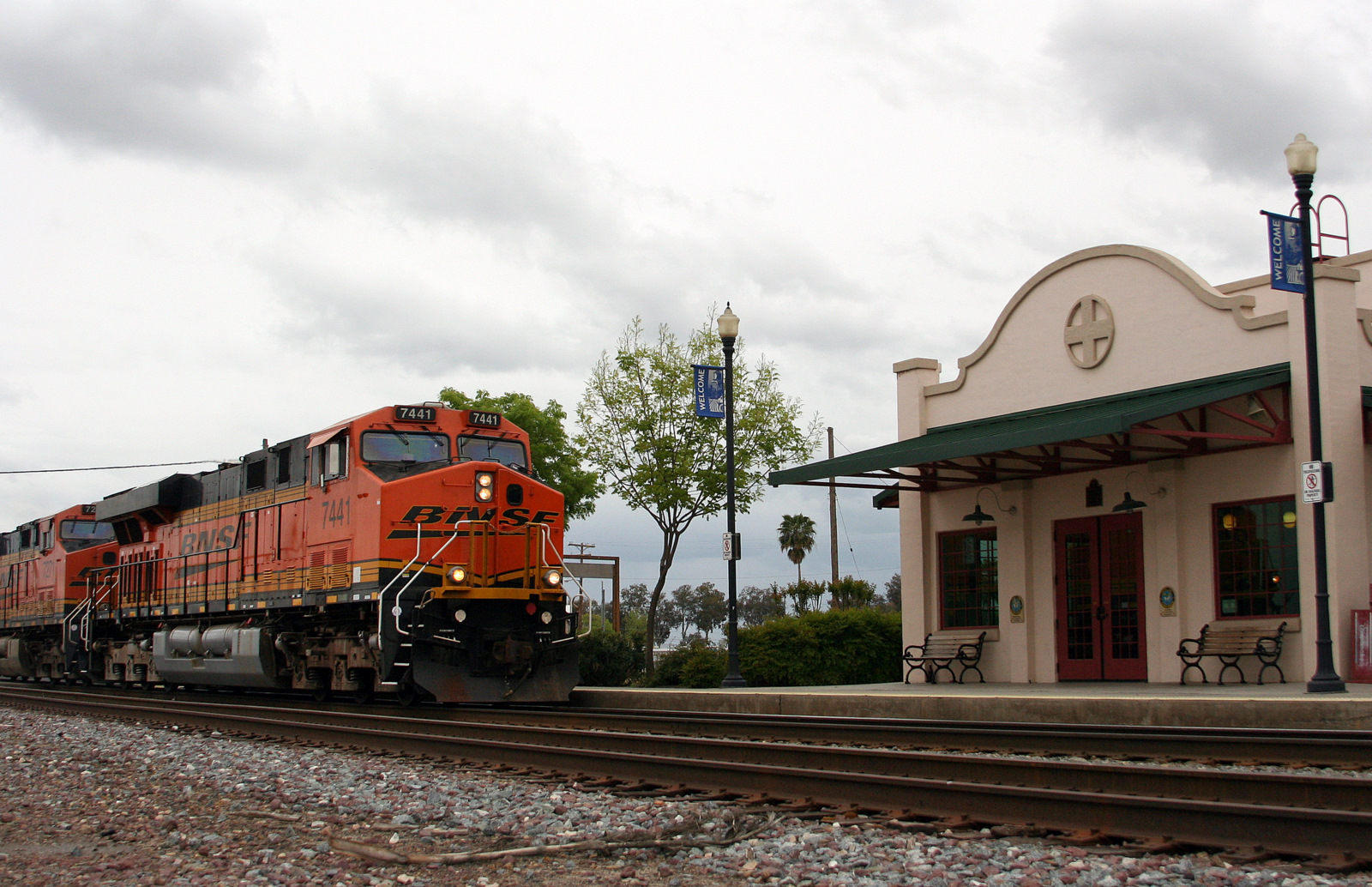
A BNSF freight train passes Corcoran station on the Bakersfield Subdivision, 2010

The Bakersfield Subdivision is a railway line in California owned and operated by the BNSF Railway. It runs from Fresno in the north where it connects to the Stockton Subdivision and Bakersfield in the south where it continues as the Mojave Subdivision.

The line was originally constructed by the San Francisco and San Joaquin Valley Railroad in the late 1890s before being acquired by the Atchison, Topeka and Santa Fe Railway and becoming its Valley Subdivision. BNSF refurbished the line in February 2007, investing $16 million for upgrades along the route. The Bakersfield Subdivision was damaged and closed for two days in 2023 due to flooding.

== Operations ==
The line is primarily used for freight. The San Joaquin Valley Railroad interchanges with the BNSF via connections in Fresno and Bakersfield. The southern segment of the Amtrak California Gold Runner operates on the line. Large segments of the California High-Speed Rail corridor will parallel the Bakersfield Subdivision. Dispatching is carried out at the Regional Operations Center in San Bernardino.
