= Mojave Subdivision =

Railway line in California

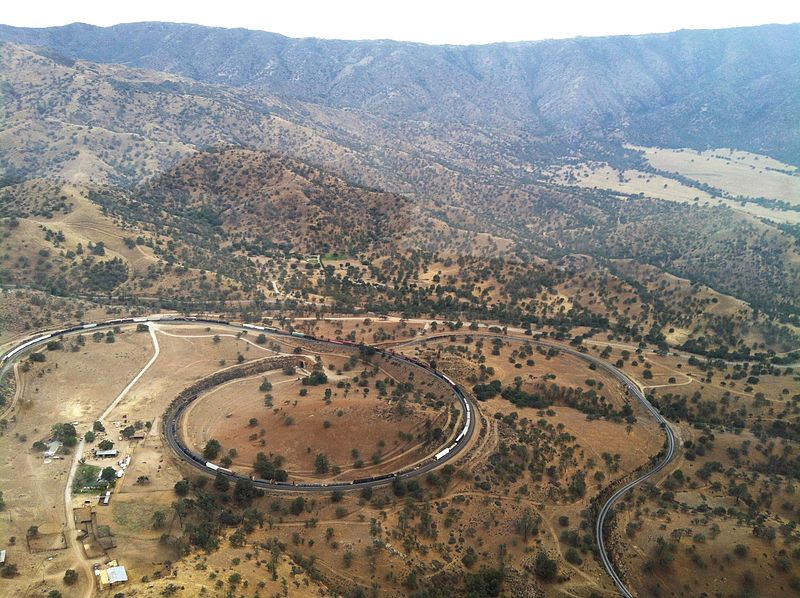
The Tehachapi Loop, the defining feature of the railway, as it traverses the Tehachapi Pass

The Mojave Subdivision refers to a series of railway lines in California. The primary route crosses the Tehachapi Pass and features the Tehachapi Loop, connecting Bakersfield to the Mojave Desert. East of Mojave, the line splits with the Union Pacific Railroad portion continuing south to Palmdale and Colton over the Cajon Pass and the BNSF Railway owned segment running east to Barstow. Both companies generally share trackage rights across the lines.

== History ==
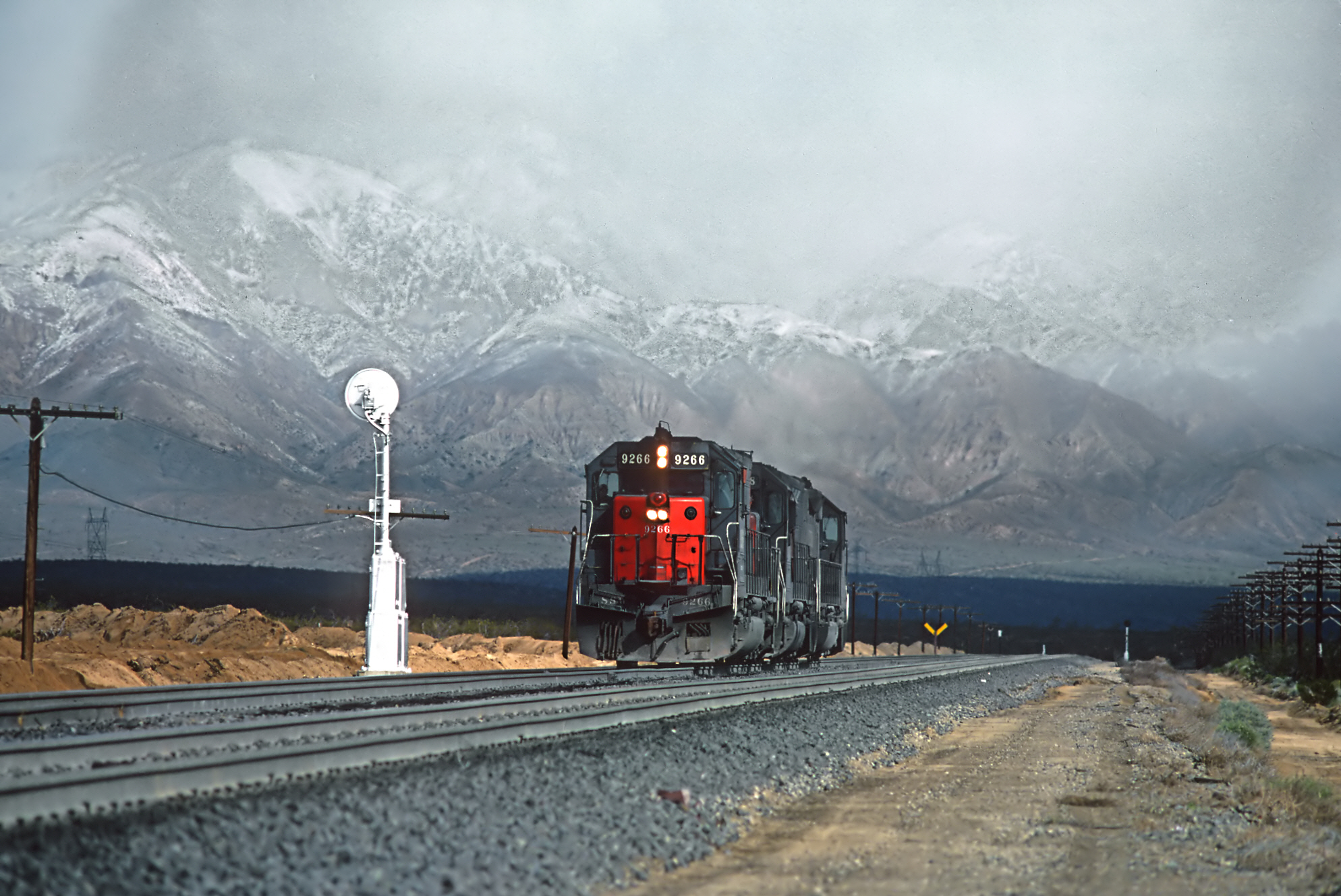
SP 9266 near Mojave, California in March 1983

The route over the Tehachapi Pass was constructed by the Southern Pacific Railroad as their main line south to the Colorado River. As part of their charter, the company was steadily building south in the San Joaquin Valley after having abandoned plans to do so via the coastal route. Built simultaneously to the Fresno Subdivision, the rail head reached Goshen in August 1872, Delano on July 14, 1873, Caliente on April 26, 1875, and Mojave on August 9, 1876. The completion of the line through the Soledad Canyon in 1876 provided the first link between Los Angeles and San Francisco via rail. Union Pacific gained trackage rights over the Cajon Pass in 1905. The Victorville Cutoff was opened in 1967 under Southern Pacific.

The Atchison, Topeka and Santa Fe Railway had purchased the San Francisco and San Joaquin Valley Railroad in 1898, but the valley was isolated from their mainline which ran from Needles to Los Angeles and San Diego. After the Valley Division was opened in 1900, they negotiated with Southern Pacific for the right to run trains over the Tehachapi. This trackage rights arrangement persists to the era of the railroads' successors: Union Pacific and BNSF.

== Operations ==
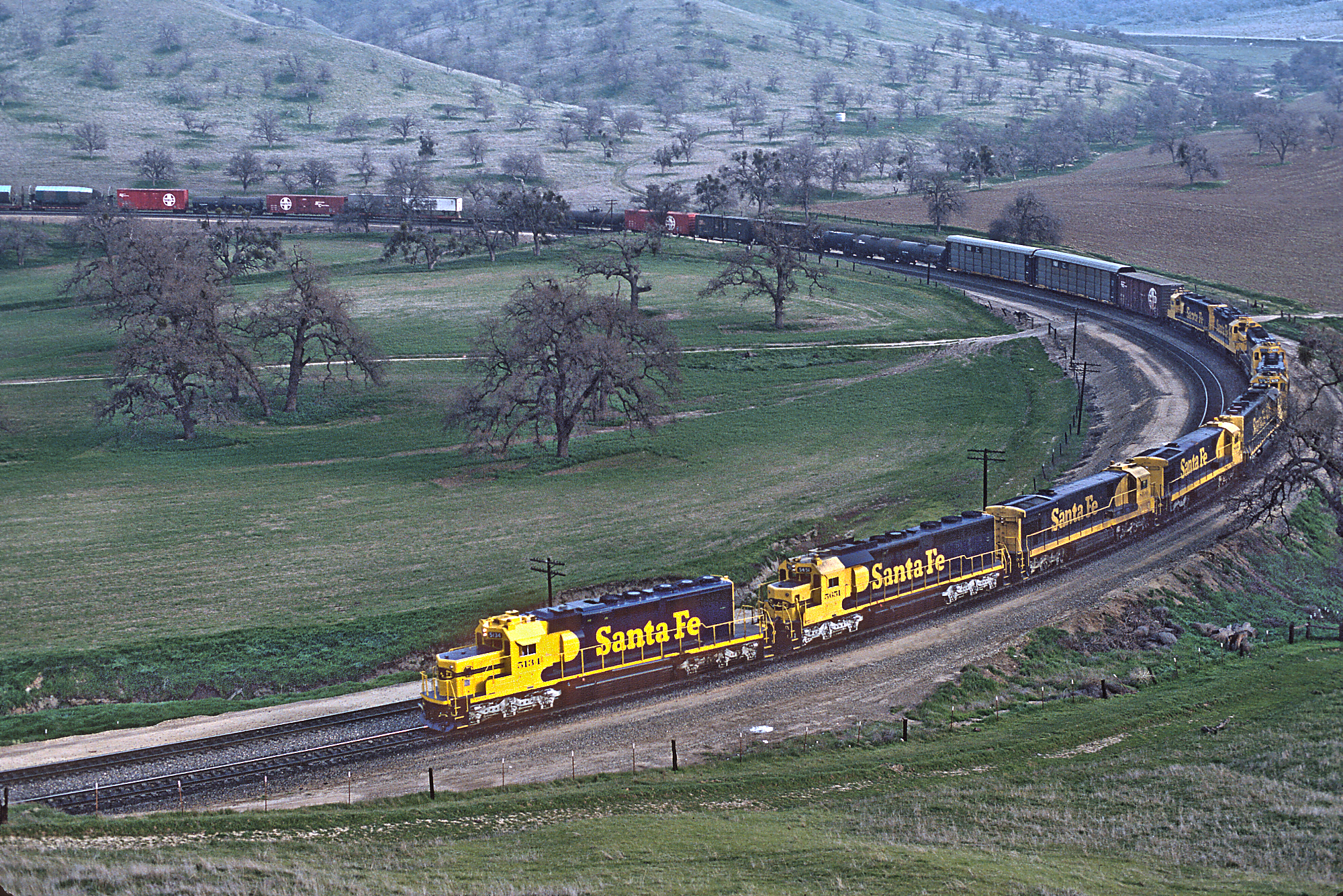
ATSF 5134 in the Tehachapis in March 1985

Both the Union Pacific and BNSF operate trains between Barstow and Bakersfield. As of 2003 the line between Mojave and Bakersfield sees 39 freight trains daily, with 28 operating between Mojave and Barstow.

When Amtrak restarted passenger train service in the San Joaquin valley in 1974, Southern Pacific protested having trains run between Bakersfield and Los Angeles; the railway over the Tehachapi was among the busiest single-track railway lines in the world at the time. The Coast Starlight and the Southwest Chief occasionally utilizes the route when there is planned maintenance along the Coast Line and Surf Line. Metrolink trains on the Antelope Valley Line between Palmdale and Lancaster operate on the parallel Valley Subdivision, owned by the Southern California Regional Rail Authority.
