= Kings Area Regional Transit =

Public transit agency of Kings County, California

- Parent: Kings County Area Public Transit Agency
- Founded: 1980
- Headquarters: 610 W 7th St
- Locale: Hanford, CA
- Service type: Bus service, Dial-a-Ride
- Routes: 15
- Hubs: Hanford Transit Center
- Annual ridership: 526,131 (2020)
- Operator: MV Transportation
- Website: Official website

Kings Area Regional Transit (KART, previously Kings Area Rural Transit) is the primary bus service serving residents and visitors to the cities of Avenal, Hanford, and Lemoore in Kings County, California. KART is the branded service operated by the Kings County Area Public Transit Agency (KCAPTA) since June 1980; KCAPTA has contracted with MV Transportation to provide operations and maintenance for KART. It provides both intracity routes within and intercity routes between those three cities; in addition, it provides routes serving rural communities within Kings County as well as commuter routes connecting to Fresno Area Express in Fresno and Visalia Transit in Visalia.

== History ==
The Kings County Area Public Transit Agency is a joint powers agency that began operations in June 1980, formed by the four cities of Avenal, Cororan, Hanford, and Lemoore in partnership with the County of Kings. The City of Corcoran withdrew from KCAPTA two years later. On July 5, 2005, KCAPTA became a separate public entity; prior to that time, KCAPTA was part of the county government.

KCAPTA also was responsible for operating vanpool programs in Kings County between 2001 and 2012. The vanpool programs were transferred to a new joint powers agency, CalVans in 2012.

== Structure ==
KCAPTA is governed by a five-person board of directors, consisting of two members appointed from the Kings County Board of Supervisors, and one member each from the three cities.

== Routes and services ==
KART operates ten local fixed routes (Routes 1–9 in Hanford and Route 20 in Lemoore) and five out-of-town routes (Routes 12, 13, 14, 15, and 17), connecting Hanford with Avenal, Corcoran, Laton, Visalia, and Fresno, respectively.

All routes start and end at the Hanford Transit Center, also known as the KART Transfer Center.

Kings Area Regional Transit fixed routes
No.	Route name	via (destinations)	Typical headway (minutes)	Refs.
1	Green Line	Douty, Fargo, 11th (Adventist Health Community Care-Hanford, Hanford High School, Hidden Valley Park, Kings Community Action Organization)	30 (M–F); 60 (Sa)	
2	Orange Line	10th, Fargo, Douty (Hanford Fraternal Hall, Hanford High School, Adventist Health Community Care-Hanford)	30 (M–F); 60 (Sa)	
3	Purple Line	11th, Florinda, 9 1/4, Lacey (Adventist Health Community Care-Hanford, Civic Park)	30 (M–F); 60 (Sa)	
4	Brown Line	Douty, 3rd, 10th, Hanford-Armona (Kings County Fairgrounds)	30 (M–F); 60 (Sa)	
5	Pink Line	11th, Hume, 12th, Hanford-Armona (Hanford DMV, Martin Luther King Jr. Elementary School)	30 (M–F); 60 (Sa)	
6	Blue Line	Lacey, Centennial, 7th (Hanford West High School, Kings County Government Center, Target, Walmart, Hanford Mall, Adventist Health Community Care-Hanford)	30 (M–Sa)	
7	Red Line	11th, Grangeville, Centennial, Lacey (YMCA, Hanford Mall, Kings County Government Center)	30 (M–F); 60 (Sa)	
8	Gray Line	11th, Hanford-Armona, 10th, Houston (Kings County Fairgrounds, Hanford DMV)	30 (M–F); 60 (Sa)	
9	Yellow Line	7th, Lacey, 13th, Centennial (Kings County Government Center, Courthouse, College of the Sequoias, Four Seasons Mobile Park, Hanford Mall)	30 (M–F); 60 (Sa)	
12	Avenal	SR 198, SR 41, I-5 (Lemoore, Stratford, Kettleman City, Avenal)	105–180 (M–F); 315 (Sa)	
13	Corcoran	SR 43 (Corcoran, Corcoran State Prison)	2 runs daily (M–F)	
14	Laton	14th, Excelsior, 12 3/4 (Hardwick, Laton)	2 runs daily (M–F)	
15	Visalia	SR 198 (College of the Sequoias, Visalia Transit Center, Kaweah Delta Medical Center)	4 runs M–F, 2 runs Sa	
17	Fresno	SR 99 (Laton, Selma, Fowler, Fresno [Fulton Street, Community Regional Medical Center, Veteran's Hospital, Kaiser Hospital], Valley Children's Hospital)	2 runs on Wed and Fri	
20	Lemoore	SR 198 (Armona, Lemoore)	30 (M–Sa)	
21	NAS Lemoore	SR 198 (Lemoore)	3 runs daily (M–F)	

In addition to its fixed routes, KART operates paratransit services in Hanford, Lemoore, and Armona, providing service to and from destinations within 3/4 mi (1.2 km) of existing fixed route services. An additional fee is required for service to destinations up to 1 1/2 mi (2.4 km) of fixed route services. Flex routes are provided in the same cities during weekdays.

=== Fares ===
No change is provided on board the bus.

Type		Local Routes	Out-of-Town Routes	Paratransit
Single trip	Regular (Note: Children 6 and under may ride free with an adult.)	$1.25	$1.75	$2.50 (Note: A personal care assistant may ride free with a qualified individual.)
Single trip	Discounted (Note: Must have KART-issued ID card or Medicare card to qualify.)	$0.60	$0.85	$2.50 (Note: Additional fare for each companion and/or child.)
1-Day Pass		$4.00	$5.50	$5.00 (Note: "Premium Single Trip" for individuals between 3/4 and 1 1/2 mi (1.2 and 2.4 km) from the service area.)
10-Trip Card		$10.00	$14.00	$25.00
30-Day Pass	Regular	$50.00	$60.00	—
30-Day Pass	Discounted	$40.00	$50.00	—

== Fleet and facilities ==
Buses operate primarily from the KART Transfer Center; in addition, KCAPTA has an Administrative Office and KART Maintenance Facility. The existing Transfer Center has 10 bus bays; the Administrative Office is near the Transfer Center on 7th Street in downtown Hanford, and buses enter the site on 8th. Bus operators are provided by MV Transportation.

The KART Transfer Center (504 W 7th St) is west of the railroad tracks, near the Hanford station serving Amtrak and the planned Cross Valley Corridor; KCAPTA have acquired 4 acres (1.6 ha) in the block bounded by 7th, Brown, 8th, and Harris, approximately 1/2 mi (0.80 km) to the east and plan to construct a new Hanford Transit Center and administration building there. The new transit center is scheduled to open in 2024. KCAPTA officials presented preliminary designs by RRM Design Group, based in San Luis Obispo, to the Hanford City Council in February 2022.
