= Atchison, Topeka and Santa Fe Railway Valley Division =

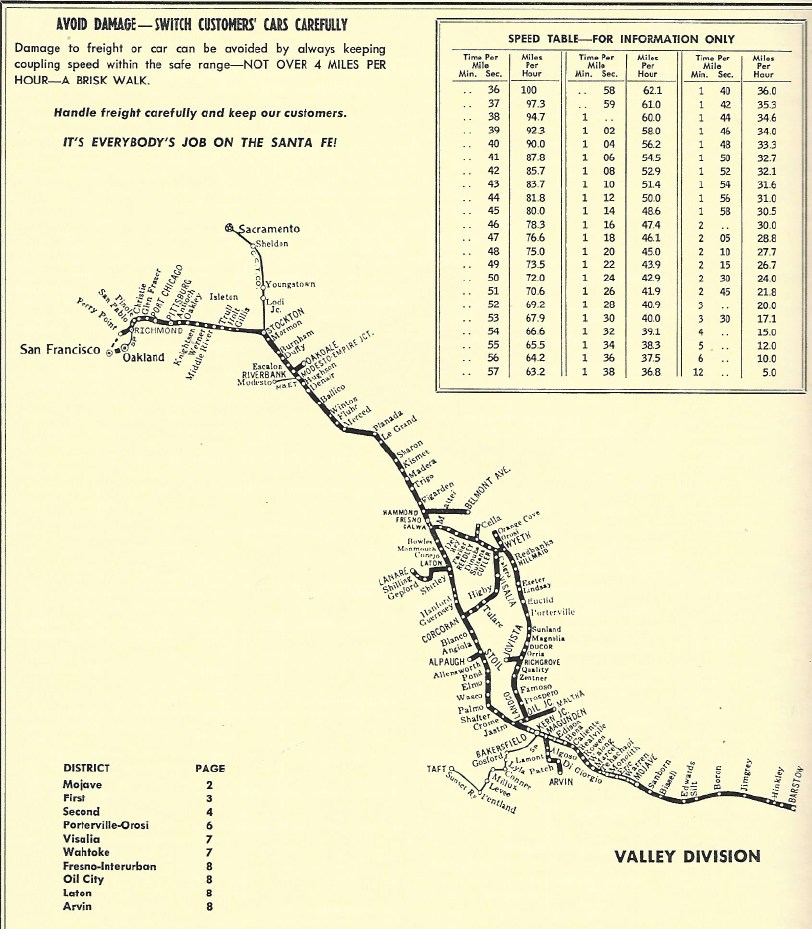
Valley Division Map

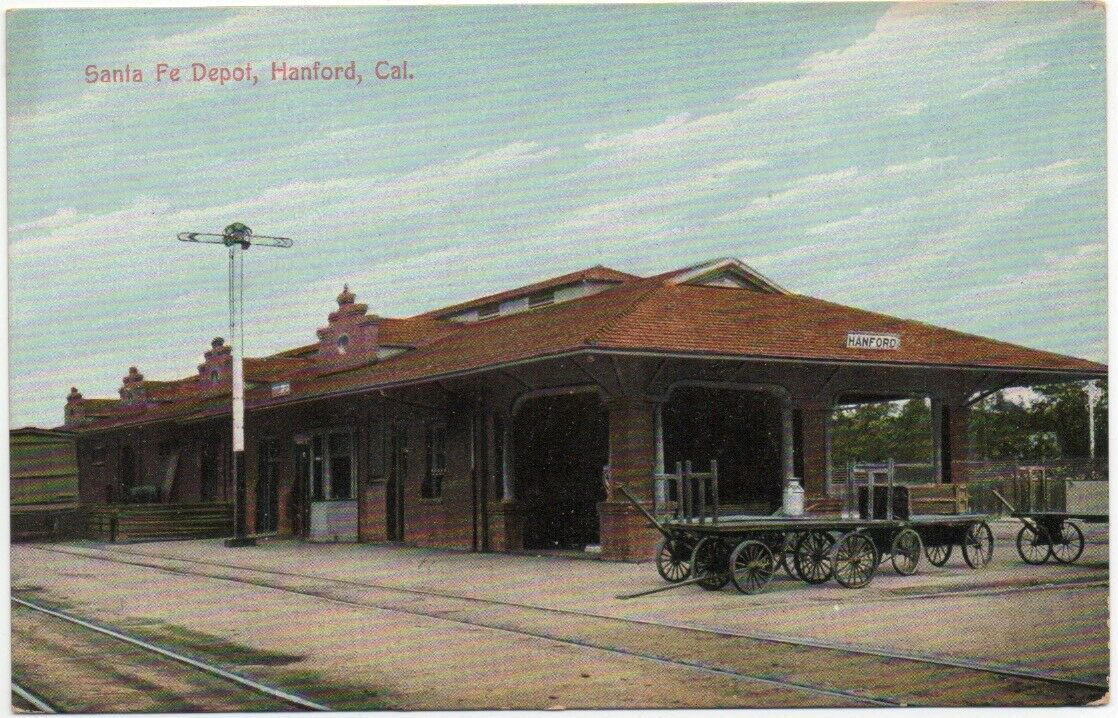
Hanford station in 1910

The Valley Division of the Atchison, Topeka and Santa Fe Railway ran from San Francisco to Barstow in California. It is currently in operation as the BNSF Railway's Stockton Subdivision and Bakersfield Subdivision.

Much of the line south to Bakersfield was constructed in the 1890s as part of the San Francisco and San Joaquin Valley Railroad. Passenger service between Richmond and Oakland began in June 1904. Passenger service on that segment ended in the 1950s.

The Valley Division and Los Angeles Division were merged into the "California Division" in 1988.

However by 1996, BNSF had divided the lines into five subdivisions:

- Bakersfield (Bakersfield to Calwa);
- Stockton (Calwa to Richmond);
- Riverbank (Riverbank to Oakdale, sold off to Sierra Northern in 2008);
- Sunset Railway (Gosford to Taft); and most of a fifth,
- Mojave (Hutt to Bakersfield, with trackage rights on Southern Pacific's Tehachapi line).

== Spurs ==
Fresno Interurban District: In the Fresno area, a spur known as the Fresno Interurban District ran from Fresno to the east. The stations on that spur were Hammond, Cincotta, Bartonette, Cameo, Burness, Fairview, Big Bunch, Zediker, Riverbend, Elk, and Belmont Ave. Aerial photos show the eastern portion of the line was abandoned sometime in the late 70s or early 80s. When SP abandoned the southern portion of their Clovis Branch, they used ATSF's line up until Cameo to access their own rails. The Tulare Valley Railroad acquired the tracks from Hammond to Cameo around 1992 along with the SP line.

Laton and Western Railroad: South of Fresno, a line from Laton west to Lanare was constructed from 1910 to 1912. An abandonment application for the line, approximately 17.56 miles (28.26 km), was filed in 1980. Other stations on the spur, running west from Laton, were Shirley, Gepford, and Shilling.

Arvin Subdivision: A 17-mile (27 km) jointly owned branch with the SP from Magunden to Arvin, acquired by the Tulare Valley Railroad in 1992, and later the San Joaquin Valley Railroad
