= FAX Q =

Bus route in Fresno, California

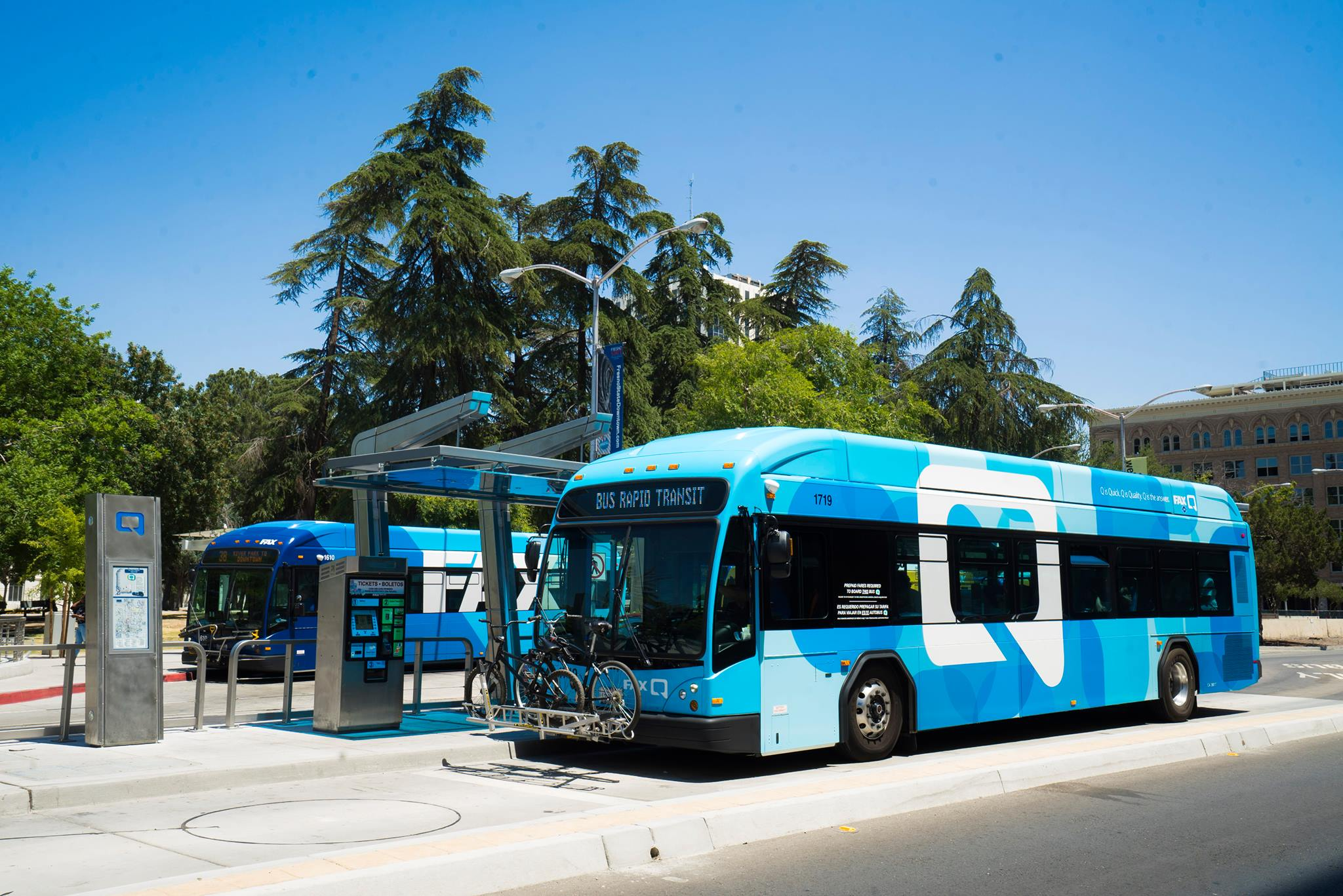
- Q BRT bus stopped at Van Ness station, with another bus stopped at the Downtown TC

Overview
- System: Fresno Area Express (FAX)
- Vehicle: Gillig BRT Plus
- Began service: February 19, 2018
- Predecessors: Routes 28 and 30

Route
- Locale: Fresno, California
- Start: Woodward Station
- Via: Blackstone Avenue; Ventura Avenue; Kings Canyon Road
- End: Clovis Station
- Length: 15.7 mi (25.3 km)
- Stations: 27

Service
- Frequency: Peak: 10 minutes Off-peak: 15 minutes Nights: Hourly
- Weekend frequency: 15 minutes
- Journey time: 1 hour, 15 minutes
- Operates: Daily, 6 am – Midnight
- Annual patronage: 2,303,017 (FY 2024)
- Map: FAX Q map
Route map
FAX Q highlighted in cyan

FAX Q is a transit bus route, with some bus rapid transit features, operated by Fresno Area Express (FAX) in Fresno, California, operated as Route 1. The line began service on February 19, 2018, running from Woodward station near Woodward Park to Clovis Station along Blackstone Avenue and Ventura Avenue/Kings Canyon Road. Between the termini there are a total of 25 stations, two of which are major regional transit centers.

== History ==
Adding bus rapid transit (BRT) in the city of Fresno was first studied in 2008, which ended with four corridors recommended for enhanced service: Blackstone Avenue, Shaw Avenue, Cedar Avenue and Kings Canyon Road/Ventura Avenue. These four had been identified as major transit corridors, worthy of additional investment, since the 1994 Transit Master Plan.

In October 2009, the City selected a combination of the Blackstone Avenue and Kings Canyon Road/Ventura Avenue corridors for conversion into BRT, and applied for a Federal Transit Administration grant. The city was awarded $39.5 million from the federal government in December 2010.

As originally proposed by the city, the bus rapid transit features that would be used on the line would have included sections of bus lanes, queue jumps, bus bulbs, raised platforms level with the floor of the buses, off-board fare payment, custom built stations and 60-foot articulated buses. Members of the Fresno City Council rejected most of these features and in April 2014 the line was stripped down to only include bus bulbs, mass-produced stations, off-board fare payment and 40-foot buses. Critics said that these changes meant the line no longer met the minimum standard to be called bus rapid transit. Fresno Area Express also agreed to improve service on the two corridors not selected, Shaw Avenue and Cedar Avenue, to every 15 minutes on weekdays. Service every 15 minutes, branded FAX15, was introduced in January 2017 and bus stops along the line were improved in 2022 and 2023.

After years of studying and fights over the features of the line, construction finally began in June 2016 with the line ready for operation in Fall 2017. The 15.7-mile (25.3 km) corridor would ultimately cost US$56 million to build, with additional costs being covered by state and local sources, including Fresno's Measure C transportation tax. The line opened a few months behind schedule on February 19, 2018.

In 2020, the city said the opening of the BRT line led to a 13% increase in ridership, and contributed to a nearly 3% rise in ridership system-wide. In its first year of operation, the line had persistent issues with the off-board fare collection machines breaking down, which led up to 25 percent of riders boarding for free. In response, the city added fareboxes back to the buses used on the BRT line and ended all-door boarding, eliminating one of the few remaining bus rapid transit features of the line.

== Stations ==
Station	Connections	Notes
Woodward		Serves Woodward Park
El Paso	FAX: 26, 32, 34, 38, 58, 58E	Serves River Park
Herndon	FAX: 3	
Sierra		
Bullard		
Barstow		
Shaw	FAX: 9	
Gettysburg		
Ashlan	FAX: 45	
Griffith		
Manchester	FAX: 28, 41	Located at the Manchester Transit Center
Clinton	FAX: 20	
Weldon		Serves Fresno City College
Olive	FAX: 35	
Belmont	FAX: 33	
Divisidero		Serves Community Regional Medical Center
Fresno Downtown		Located at Fresno and N Streets; Serves Fresno City Hall, Fresno Police HQ, Central Library
Van Ness	FAX: 22, 26, 28, 32, 34, 38, Veterans Home Shuttle; FCRTA: Coalinga, Orange Cove, Southeast, Westside; Visalia Transit: V-LINE	Located at the Downtown Transit Center; Serves Courthouse Park, Fulton Street
M St		Serves Fresno Convention Center
1st St	FAX: 34	
6th St		
Cedar	FAX: 38	
Maple	FAX: 33	
Chestnut	FAX: 41	
Willow		
Peach	FAX: 26	
Clovis	FAX: 22	
