= Santa Fe Passenger Depot (Fresno, California) =

Train station in Fresno, California

Fresno, CA
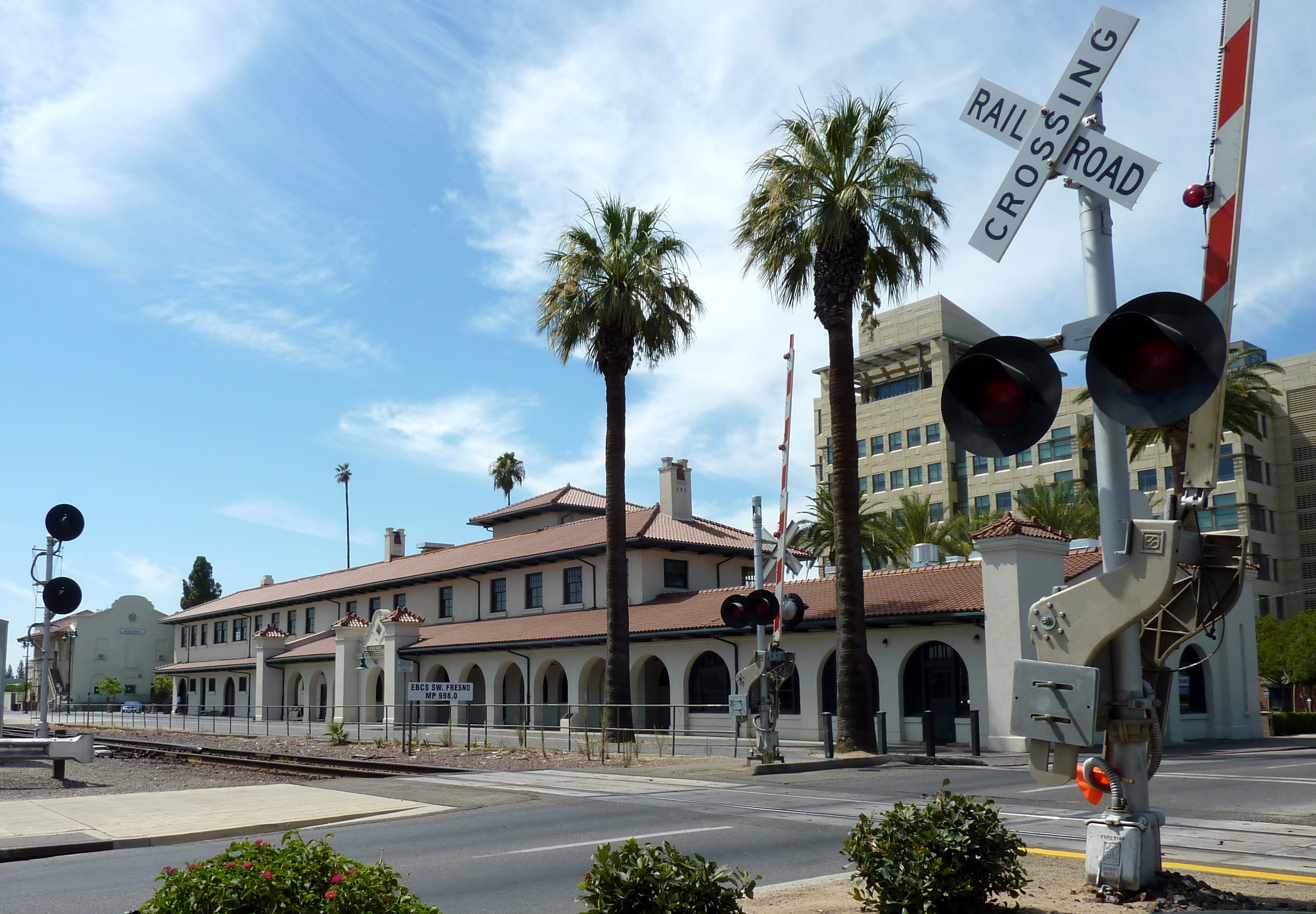
- Santa Fe Passenger Depot in 2009

General information
- Other names: Santa Fe Passenger Depot
- Location: 2650 Tulare Street; Fresno, California; United States
- Coordinates: 36°44′18″N 119°46′55″W
- Owner: City of Fresno
- Line: BNSF Stockton Subdivision
- Platforms: 1 side platform 1 island platform
- Tracks: 2
- Connections: See Bus connections section

Construction
- Parking: 11 short term spaces, 98 long term spaces
- Accessible: Yes

Other information
- Status: Staffed, checked baggage service available
- Station code: Amtrak: FNO

History
- Opened: 1899
- Rebuilt: 2005
- Original company: San Francisco and San Joaquin Valley Railroad

Passengers
- FY 2025: 302,753 (Amtrak)

Services
Preceding station	Amtrak	Following station
Madera toward Oakland or Sacramento	Gold Runner	Hanford toward Bakersfield
Former services
Preceding station	Amtrak	Following station
Storey until 2010 toward Oakland or Sacramento	San Joaquins	Hanford toward Bakersfield
Preceding station	Atchison, Topeka and Santa Fe Railway	Following station
Figarden toward Richmond	Valley Division	Calwa toward Barstow
Terminus	Corcoran – Fresno	Calwa toward Corcoran
- Santa Fe Passenger Depot
- U.S. National Register of Historic Places
- Area: 1.1 acres (0.4 ha)
- Architect: William Benson Storey
- Architectural style: California Mission
- NRHP reference No.: 76000482
- Added to NRHP: November 7, 1976
Location

The Santa Fe Passenger Depot, also known as Fresno station, is an historic railroad station and transportation hub in downtown Fresno, California. It is served by Gold Runner inter-city passenger trains, Greyhound inter-city buses, and regional transit services including Fresno Area Express and the Fresno County Rural Transit Agency.

== History ==
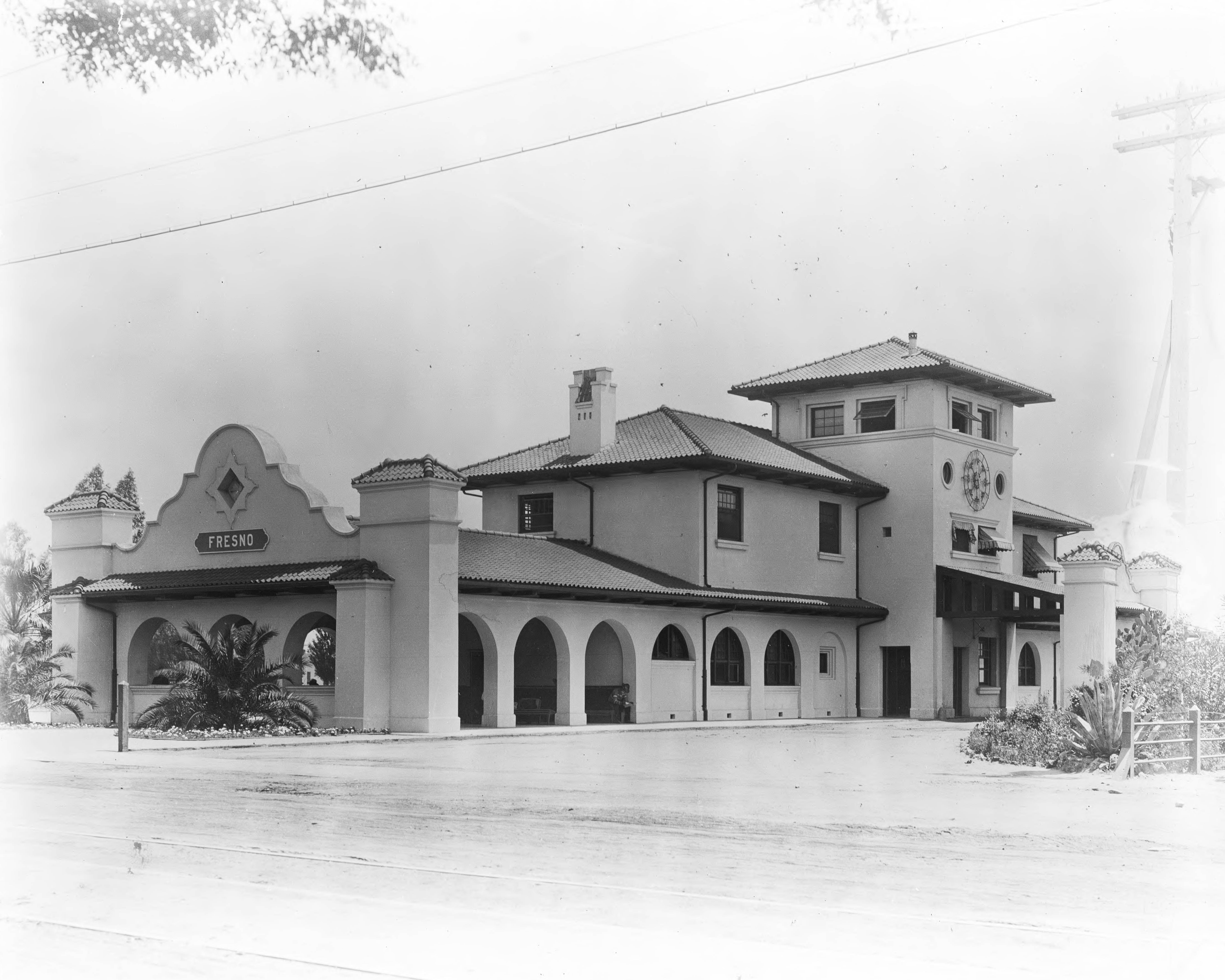
Depot c. 1910

The station was built in 1899 for the San Francisco and San Joaquin Valley Railroad (SF&SJV) and was designed by William Benson Storey for the Atchison, Topeka and Santa Fe Railway (ATSF or Santa Fe). It is very similar to the Stockton – San Joaquin Street Station. The station was once the Santa Fe's Valley Division Headquarters, and was expanded or renovated nine times between 1908 and 1985. Santa Fe closed the station for passenger service in 1966 and completely shuttered the building in the early 1990s. When passenger service to Fresno was reinstated on March 5, 1974, Amtrak used a space in the nearby freight house. By the time the city of Fresno purchased the station in 2003, it had fallen into disrepair. The station reopened on February 12, 2005, after a US$6 million renovation project largely restored it to its original 1899 appearance. After renovations there are now is 5,400 sq ft (500 m^{2}) dedicated to passenger service and another 12,300 sq ft (1,140 m^{2}) available for lease. The Santa Fe Depot was added to the National Register of Historic Places in 1976.

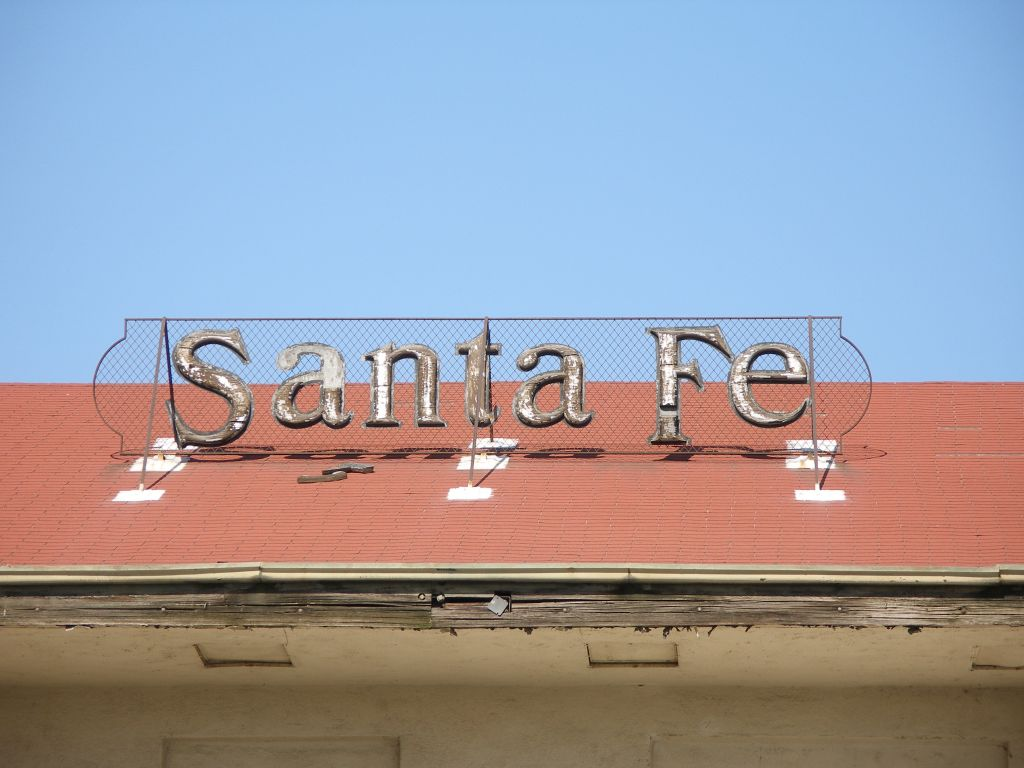
The Santa Fe sign on the Fresno Depot

From its beginning until Amtrak took over nearly all passenger rail service within the United States in 1971, the station was served by ATSF trains, including the famous San Francisco Chief and the Oakland-Barstow line. For the first few years after Amtrak's inception Fresno had no rail service. In 1974 service by Amtrak/Amtrak California's San Joaquin began. Initially, service only included daily service (once in each direction) between Oakland and Bakersfield. Originally, the next northbound stop was Merced, but by 1978 the Storey Train Station was added. (However, under Amtrak that station was known as Madera, rather than Storey.) As the years went by service increased substantially and by 2002 the San Joaquin ran twice daily (in each direction) between Sacramento and Bakersfield and four times daily (in each direction) between Oakland and Bakersfield.

Gold Runner trains are expected to cease services here once California High-Speed Rail operations begin.

== Description ==
The station is located at 2650 Tulare Street, just off Santa Fe Street, across the street from Fresno City Hall. It is situated in the middle of a rough triangle formed by the three freeways in the city (California State Route 99, California State Route 41, and California State Route 180) and is easily accessible from all three.

In fiscal year 2025, 302,753 passengers boarded or detrained at Fresno station. Excluding passengers who are transferring to a Thruway Bus, Fresno has the highest ridership on the Gold Runner service.

=== Facilities ===
The station has an indoor waiting room open from 5:45 am to 10:00 pm daily. Inside the station there is a staffed ticket counter with baggage check services. In addition to the ticketing counter, there is an automated ticket kiosk. There is also a bathroom and vending machines. The station has 11 short term and 98 long term parking spaces.

== Services ==
=== Train platforms ===
The Santa Fe passenger depot has two tracks, but only one side platform sees regular service. Amtrak trains switch onto this track just north or south of the station, leaving the Main Line clear for freight trains. There is a very narrow island platform between the tracks that is occasionally used when Amtrak trains are not able to switch onto the station track. Passengers are not allowed to wait on the island platform.

=== Bus connections ===
- Amtrak Thruway: 1 to Los Angeles via Bakersfield (late night/early morning only), 15B to Yosemite National Park (seasonal, May–September)
- Fresno Area Express: 22 (more routes serve the nearby Courthouse Park)
- Fresno County Rural Transit Agency: Coalinga, Orange Cove, Southeast, Westside
- Greyhound Lines
- Yosemite Area Regional Transportation System: Highway 41 Route (seasonal, May–September)
- V-LINE connections to Visalia are available daily from the nearby Courthouse Park
