= Fresno County Rural Transit Agency =

Transportation in Fresno County, California, United States

- Parent: Fresno Council of Governments
- Founded: September 27, 1979; 46 years ago
- Headquarters: 2035 Tulare Street, Ste 201; Fresno, California
- Service area: Fresno County, California
- Service type: Bus service, Dial-a-Ride
- Destinations: Coalinga; Firebaugh; Fowler; Huron; Kerman; Kingsburg; Mendota; Orange Cove; Reedley; Sanger; San Joaquin; Selma
- Annual ridership: 266,621 (2020)
- Website: ruraltransit.org
System map (2019)

Fresno County Rural Transit Agency (FCRTA) is the primary bus agency providing intra- and inter-city routes for smaller cities and unincorporated rural communities in Fresno County, California since 1979, including Coalinga, Firebaugh, Fowler, Huron, Kerman, Kingsburg, Mendota, Orange Cove, Reedley, Sanger, San Joaquin, and Selma. FCRTA riders may transfer to Fresno Area Express service within the county seat of Fresno, and FCRTA has additional transfer points connecting to neighboring agencies in Fresno, Kings, and Tulare counties, including Clovis Transit Stageline, Kings Area Regional Transit, and Dinuba Connection.

== History ==
Fresno County adopted a Regional Transportation Plan in March 1975, which provided a goal of establishing public transit service throughout the county by 1995, including demand responsive service in the small incorporated cities and four inter-city fixed routes:

1. Firebaugh–Mendota–Kerman (implemented as Westside Transit)
2. Kingsburg–Selma–Fowler (implemented as Southeast Transit)
3. Orange Cove–Reedley–Parlier–Sanger (implemented as Orange Cove Inter-city Transit)
4. Coalinga–Huron–Riverdale–Caruthers–Easton (implemented as Coalinga Inter-city Transit)

The Fresno County Rural Transit Agency was formed under a joint powers authority agreement signed on September 27, 1979, by the rural incorporated cities in Fresno County (Coalinga, Firebaugh, Fowler, Huron, Kerman, Kingsburg, Mendota, Orange Cove, Reedley, Sanger, San Joaquin, and Selma) and the County of Fresno. While FCRTA is the overall operator which is responsible for funding and planning the system, day-to-day operations are delegated to local agencies or their contracted providers.

=== Sub-systems ===
FCRTA's local operations are carried out by the following sub-system operators:

FCRTA local operators
Sub-system	Scope of operations			Operator
Sub-system	Intra-city	Inter-city	Inter-community	Operator
Auberry Transit	No	Yes (Note: Combined inter-city/inter-community service to Adler Springs, Auberry, New Auberry, Big Sandy Indian Rancheria, Burrough Valley, Cold Springs Indian Rancheria, Friant, Jose Basin, Marshall Station, Meadow Lakes, Mile High, Prather, Sycamore, Table Mountain Indian Rancheria, Tollhouse, and Fresno) DR (Note: demand responsive)	Yes DR	MV Transportation
Coalinga Transit	Yes DR	Yes (Note: via Coalinga Transit, serving Coalinga, Huron, Five Points, Lanare, Riverdale, Caruthers, Raisin City, Easton, and Fresno) FRD (Note: Fixed route with route deviation)	No	MV Transportation
Del Rey Transit	Yes (Note: serves Del Rey and Sanger) DR	No	No	MV Transportation
Dinuba Transit	No	No	Yes (Note: service to Dinuba and Reedley) FR (Note: Fixed route)	MV Transportation
Firebaugh Transit	Yes DR	Yes (Note: via Firebaugh–Mendota Transit, serving Firebaugh and Mendota) (Note: via Westside Transit, serving Firebaugh, Mendota, Kerman, and Fresno) FRD	No	MV Transportation
Fowler Transit	Yes DR	Yes (Note: via Southeast Transit, serving Fresno, Fowler, Selma, and Kingsburg) FRD	No	MV Transportation
Huron Transit	Yes DR	Yes (Note: serves Huron, Harris Ranch, I-5/198 Interchange, West Hills College, and Coalinga) FRD	No	MV Transportation
Kerman Transit	Yes DR	Yes FRD	No	MV Transportation
Kingsburg Transit	Yes DR	Yes (Note: as Kingsburg–Reedley Transit) FRD	No	MV Transportation
Laton Transit	No	Yes (Note: via Kings Area Regional Transit, serving Hanford, Grangeville, Hardwick, and Laton) (Note: via Inter-County Service, serving Hanford, Laton, Selma, and Fresno) FR	No	MV Transportation
Mendota Transit	Yes DR	Yes FRD	No	MV Transportation
Orange Cove Transit	Yes DR	Yes (Note: via Orange Cove Transit, serving Orange Cove, Reedley, Parlier, Sanger, and Fresno) FRD	No	MV Transportation
Parlier Transit	Yes DR	Yes FRD	No	MV Transportation
Reedley Transit	Yes DR	Yes FRD	No	MV Transportation
Rural Transit	No	No	Yes DR	MV Transportation
Sanger Transit	Yes DR	Yes (Note: service to Sanger, Parlier, and Reedley) FRD	No	MV Transportation
San Joaquin Transit	Yes (Note: San Joaquin Intercity Transit, serving San Joaquin, Cantua Creek, El Porvenir, Half Way, Tranquility, and Three Rocks) DR	Yes FRD	No	MV Transportation
Selma Transit	Yes DR	Yes FRD	No	MV Transportation
Shuttle Transit	Yes (Note: Transports passengers from Coalinga, Orange Cove, Southeast, and Westside Transit to employment, education, training, and medical appointments in the Fresno–Clovis Metropolitan Area.)	No	No	MV Transportation
Southeast Transit	No	Yes FRD	No	MV Transportation
Westside Transit	No	Yes FRD	No	MV Transportation

=== Governance ===
FCRTA is governed by a board of directors drawn from elected officials in the cities it serves, in addition to one member of the Fresno County Board of Supervisors.

== Services ==
Virtually all intra-city services are operated on weekdays only as demand responsive services. A few locations offer Saturday intra-city services, including Del Rey, Kingsburg, Reedley, Sanger, and Selma. Most inter-city and inter-community services operate as deviated fixed routes.

FCRTA fixed routes
Route name	Terminus	via (Destinations)	Terminus	Trips	Notes / Refs.
Coalinga	Coalinga Courthouse	SR 269, Mount Whitney, SR 41 (Huron, Five Points, Lanare, Riverdale, Caruthers, Raisin City, Easton, Fresno Courthouse Park / FAX)	Fresno Yosemite International Airport	1 RT; Mon–Fri	Traditional commute: service to Fresno in AM, returns to Coalinga in PM.
Huron	West American Bank (Huron)	SR 269, SR 198 (Harris Ranch, I-5/SR 198, Coalinga Hospital, West Hills College)	Kmart (Coalinga)	3 RT; Mon–Fri	
Kingsburg-Reedley	Coffee Pot Bus Shelter (Kingsburg)	SR 99, Manning (Selma, Fowler, Children's Hospital, Parlier)	Reedley College	3 RT; Mon–Fri	
Orange Cove (Express)	Los Amigo Market / Eaton Park (Orange Cove)	Manning, Academy, and Jensen (Reedley, Reedley College, Parlier, Sanger, Sanger Hospital, Fresno Amtrak/Greyhound)	Fresno Courthouse Park / FAX	2(+1) RT; Mon–Fri	(+1) Express service with limited stops for traditional commute (to Fresno in AM, return to Orange Cove in PM)
Sanger Express	Sanger Community Center	Goodfellow & Reed	Reedley College	6 RT; Mon–Fri	
Southeast	Coffee Pot Bus Shelter (Kingsburg)	SR 99 (Selma, Fowler, Children's Hospital, Fresno Courthouse Park)	Fresno Amtrak/Greyhound	3 RT; Mon–Fri	
Westside	Firebaugh Senior Center	SR 33, Whitesbridge (Mendota, Kerman, Fresno Courthouse Park)	Fresno Amtrak/Greyhound	2 RT; Mon–Fri	

=== Fares ===
Fares vary depending on the type of service and distance traveled. Intra-city fares range from free (for qualified individuals) to $0.75, one-way. Inter-city fares range from $0.75 to $6.00, one-way, depending on distance. Some sub-systems offer discounted monthly passes.

=== Transfers ===
FCRTA connects to Fresno Area Express on certain inter-city routes at stops in downtown Fresno. Many of the same routes also stop at the Fresno Santa Fe train station, which is a stop for both Amtrak Gold Runner trains and Greyhound Lines bus service.

== Fleet ==
The transit fleet used primarily cutaway passenger vans powered by unleaded gasoline and CNG; in addition, there are several larger (21 to 33 passengers) battery-electric buses from Proterra and BYD.
