= Fresno Convention Center =

Convention center located in Fresno, California

Fresno Convention & Entertainment Center
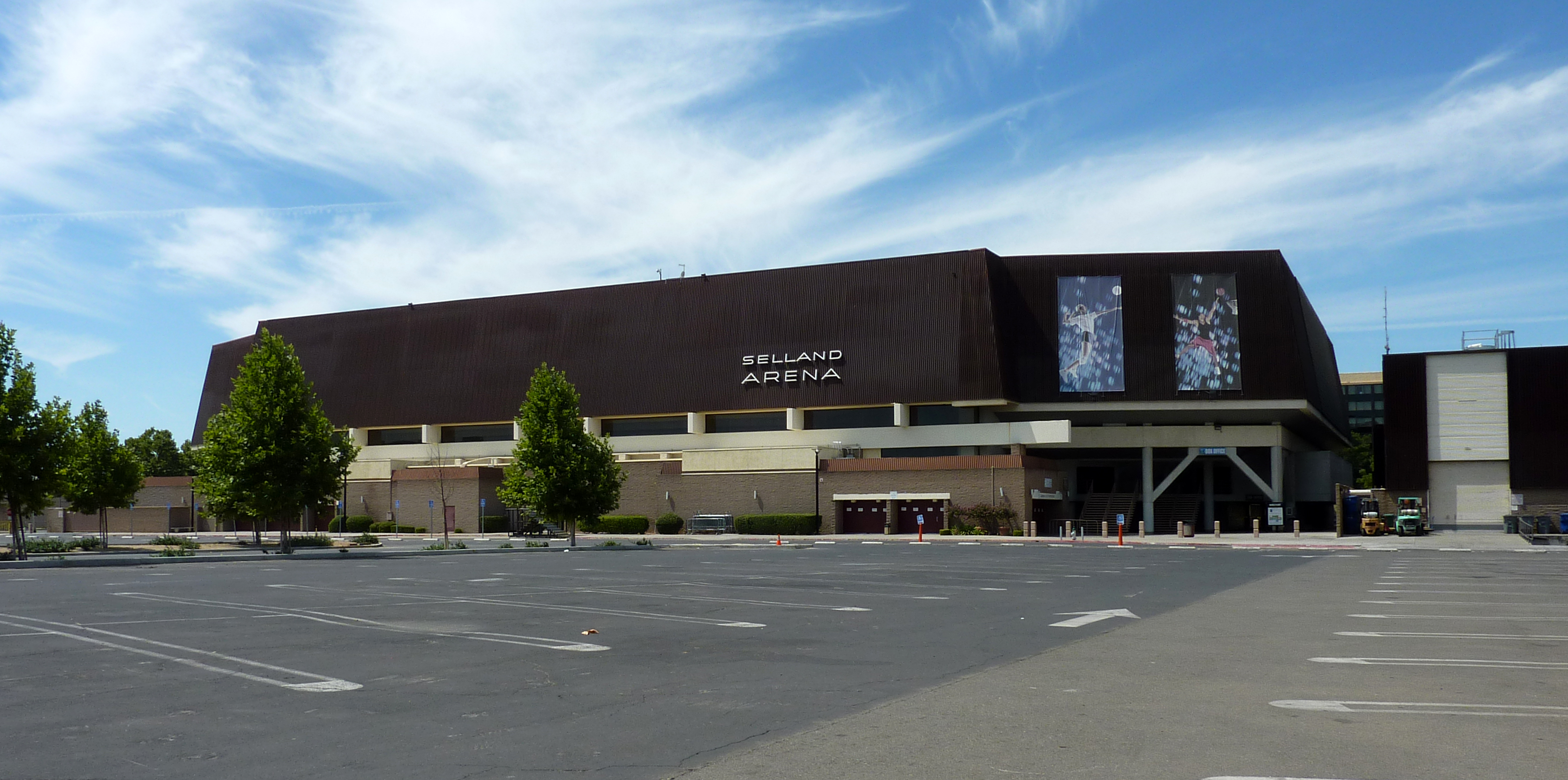
- Exterior view of Selland Arena (c. 2009)
- Address: 848 M St; Fresno, California
- Coordinates: 36.73365°N 119.78347°W
- Owner: City of Fresno
- Operator: VenuWorks
- Public transit: FAX: 1Q, 26, 34

Construction
- Opened: October 1966
- Expanded: 1981, 1999

Website
- Venue Website

The Fresno Convention & Entertainment Center is a convention center located in Fresno, California. The four-building complex was originally made up of three main venues when completed in 1966, and underwent several expansions with the latest additions in 1981 and 1999.

== Selland Arena ==
Named after former Fresno mayor Arthur L. Selland, the Selland Arena is a 24,200 ft^{2} (2,250 m^{2}) multi-purpose arena with a seating capacity of more than 9,000. The facility was home to the Central Valley Coyotes of the AF2, the Fresno State men's basketball program and Fresno Falcons hockey team. It has hosted various entertainment, concert, and college sporting events throughout the years, most notably WWE's Royal Rumble, WWF Fully Loaded, the 2000 Western Athletic Conference basketball tournament and Ringling Bros. and Barnum & Bailey Circus.

California Future Farmers of America Association holds its annual state leadership conference in April which lasts 4 days. Here members from the National FFA Organization from the State of California learn premier leadership, personal growth and career success.

The numerous bands and artists that have played Selland Arena in concert include; Metallica, No Doubt, Korn, Garth Brooks, Tom Petty, The Grateful Dead, Hilary Duff, Joe Bonamassa, Rush, and Van Halen. Van Halen recorded their 1992 "Right Here Right Now" Live Home Video/DVD concert here over a two night sold out series of concerts May 14–15, 1992.

== William Saroyan Theatre ==
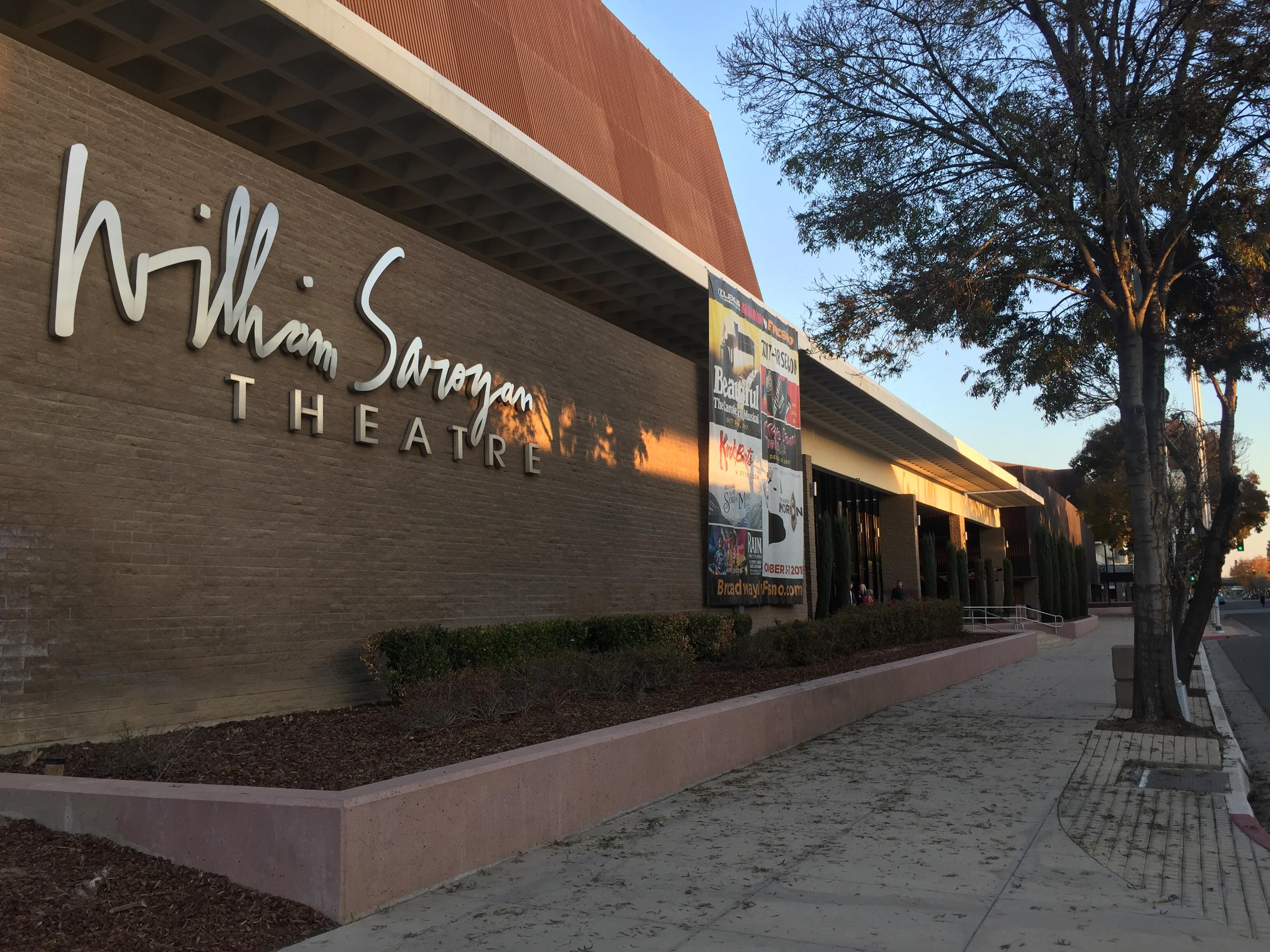
Saroyan Theater in 2017

Named after native Fresnan novelist William Saroyan, the 2,353-seat theatre is home to the Fresno Philharmonic, Fresno Grand Opera, the Fresno Ballet, and Broadway in Fresno. Thomas Griswold conducted the inaugural concert in this new theatre on October 14, 1966. The concert included the Consecration of the House Overture by Ludwig van Beethoven, Enigma Variations by Edward Elgar, Appalachian Spring by Aaron Copland and Daphnis et Chloé by Maurice Ravel.

The theatre recently underwent an extensive renovation, including front-of-house enhancements to the main lobby and VIP Lounge, as well as back-of-house upgrades with five dressing rooms and star rooms, chorus rooms, production offices and a green room.

The William Saroyan Theatre has hosted Mikhail Baryshnikov, Arthur Fiedler, George Carlin, Jerry Seinfeld, and Isaac Stern as well as magician David Copperfield, Broadway shows Cats, The Sound of Music, Evita, Chicago, and Riverdance and the Miss California Pageant.

== Ernest E. Valdez Hall ==
The Valdez Hall is one of the Fresno Convention & Entertainment Center's largest venues, with space for social events such as dances, banquets and weddings, as well as meetings, conventions, trade shows and other special events. This multi-purpose, 32,000 square-foot hall is column free, has an attached kitchen, a 20' x 30' built-in performance stage, and two green rooms.

== Exhibit Hall ==
With three exhibit halls that can be used separately or combined into one large hall, the venue offers more than 66,000 square feet of space and a kitchen, usable for exhibits, conventions and trade shows, as well as social functions such as weddings, banquets and community events. The second floor has 20 meeting rooms, including an exhibitor lounge. An additional 16,000 square feet of space is also available in the first and second floor lobbies.

== See also ==
- List of convention centers in the United States
