= Clovis Transit =

Public transportation agency in Clovis, California, US

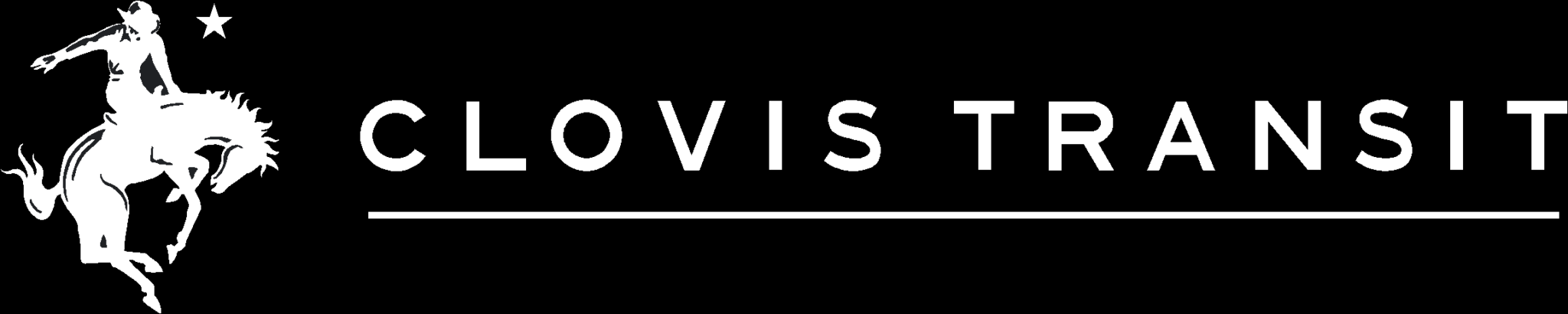
- Parent: City of Clovis
- Founded: January 1979; 46 years ago
- Service area: Clovis, California
- Service type: Bus service, dial-a-ride
- Annual ridership: 130,515 (FY18, Stageline); 52,061 (FY18, Round Up)
- Website: clovistransit.com
System map (2020)
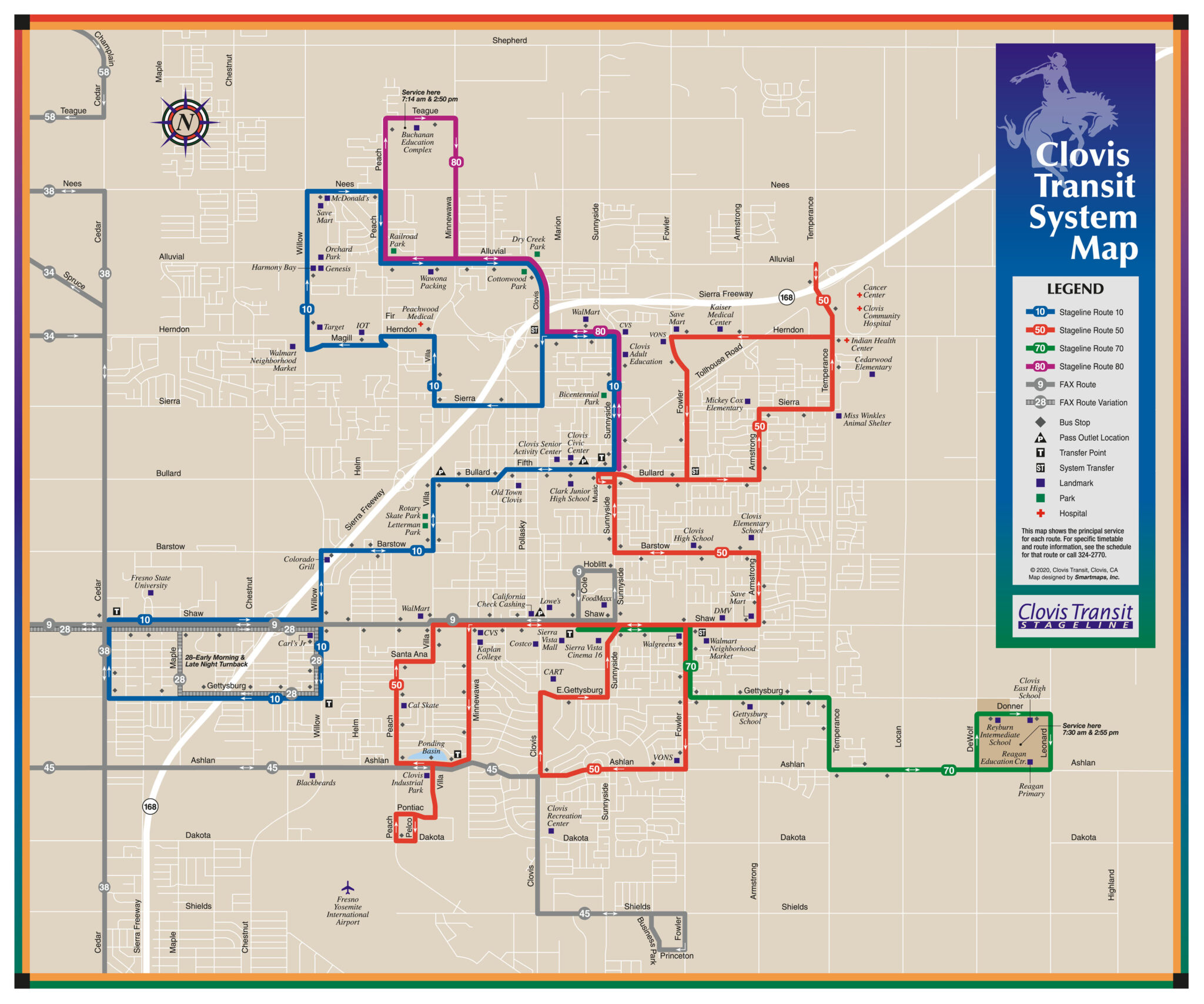

Clovis Transit is the public transportation agency which provides fixed intra-city routes (branded Clovis Transit Stageline) and dial-a-ride service (as Clovis Transit Round Up) for Clovis, the second-largest city in Fresno County, California after the neighboring city and county seat, Fresno. Public transportation in Clovis was provided by Fresno Area Express (FAX) until 1979–80, when Clovis began developing its own transportation services. Stageline riders can transfer to FAX, which provides service connecting to Fresno.

== History ==
Public transportation service in Clovis was provided by a mixture of fixed routes from FAX and a dial-a-ride service, Round Up, which started in January 1979, funded by a grant from the Older Americans Act.

The Stageline service started as demand-responsive transportation in July 1980, replacing fixed routes formerly provided by FAX. In August 1990, Stageline was converted to a fixed route service under a contracted operator, and in September 1999, the City of Clovis took over Stageline operations.

== Services ==
Stageline operates eight primary fixed routes (10 and 50) from Monday through Saturday; in addition, Stageline operates one "Education Center Express" route (80) with one round-trip each per weekday.

Route	Terminus	via (Destinations)	Terminus	Typ. Headway (minutes)	Notes / Refs.
Blue	Clovis Community College–Willow Campus (Willow Av & International Av)	Willow	Fresno County Department of Social Services (Peach Av & Dakota Av)	30 (Mon–Sat)	
Green	California State University, Fresno	Shaw	Reagan Education Center	30 (Mon–Sat)	
Orange	Fresno County Department of Social Services (Peach Av & Dakota Av)	Ashlan	Reagan Education Center	30 (Mon–Sat)	
Pink	Alluvial Av	Temperance Av	Ashlan Av & Armstrong Av	30 (Mon–Sat)	
Purple	Dry Creek Park (Nees Av & Clovis Av)	Sunnyside Av (Sierra Vista Mall, Clovis Civic Center, Clovis Adult School, Bicentennial Park, Clark Intermediate)	Shaw Av & Cole Av	30 (Mon–Sat)	
Red	California State University, Fresno (Campus Pointe)	Barstow & Bullard (Clovis Civic Center, Clark Intermediate, Clovis High)	Temperance Av	30 (Mon–Sat)	
Teal	Willow Av	Herndon Av (Clovis Community College–Herndon Campus, Clovis Community Hospital)	Temperance Av & Alluvial Av	30 (Mon–Sat)	
Yellow	Buchanan Education Center	Clovis Av (Clovis Civic Center)	Fresno County Department of Social Services (Peach Av & Dakota Av)	30 (Mon–Sat)	
80	Sunnyside Av & Fifth St	Sunnyside Av, Alluvial Av, & Peach Av (Clovis Adult School, Bicentennial Park)	Buchanan Education Center	1 round-trip (Mon–Fri)	

Round Up demand-responsive service operates from Monday through Saturday, and also operates on Sunday within Clovis city limits only. In addition, the "Clovis Old Town Trolley", a bus styled to resemble a streetcar, is available for charter through the City of Clovis.

Stageline route 50 also offers service to residents of the Tarpey Village, an unincorporated county island, through a reimbursement agreement with the County of Fresno. Similarly, the City of Clovis has a reimbursement agreement with the City of Fresno to extend some Fresno Area Express routes into Clovis (see § Transfers below).

=== Fares ===
In October 2020, the Clovis City Council unanimously voted to remove fares from Stageline and Round Up, with the cost of transit services being covered by grants. The city had previously experimented with a free fare model in 2019.

=== Transfers ===
Stageline service connects to Fresno Area Express. Stageline 10 connects to FAX routes 9 and 38 at Shaw and Cedar near Fresno State University and route 3 at Willow and Herndon. Stageline 50 connects to FAX route 9 at the Sierra Vista Mall along Shaw, route 28 at the Fresno County Clovis Campus (Peach and Dakota), and route 45 at Villa and Ashlan and again at Clovis and Ashlan.

== Fleet ==
Stageline uses 13 buses equipped with lifts; Round Up uses 17 buses with lifts and 3 passenger vans.
