= Madera station (Amtrak) =

Madera, CA
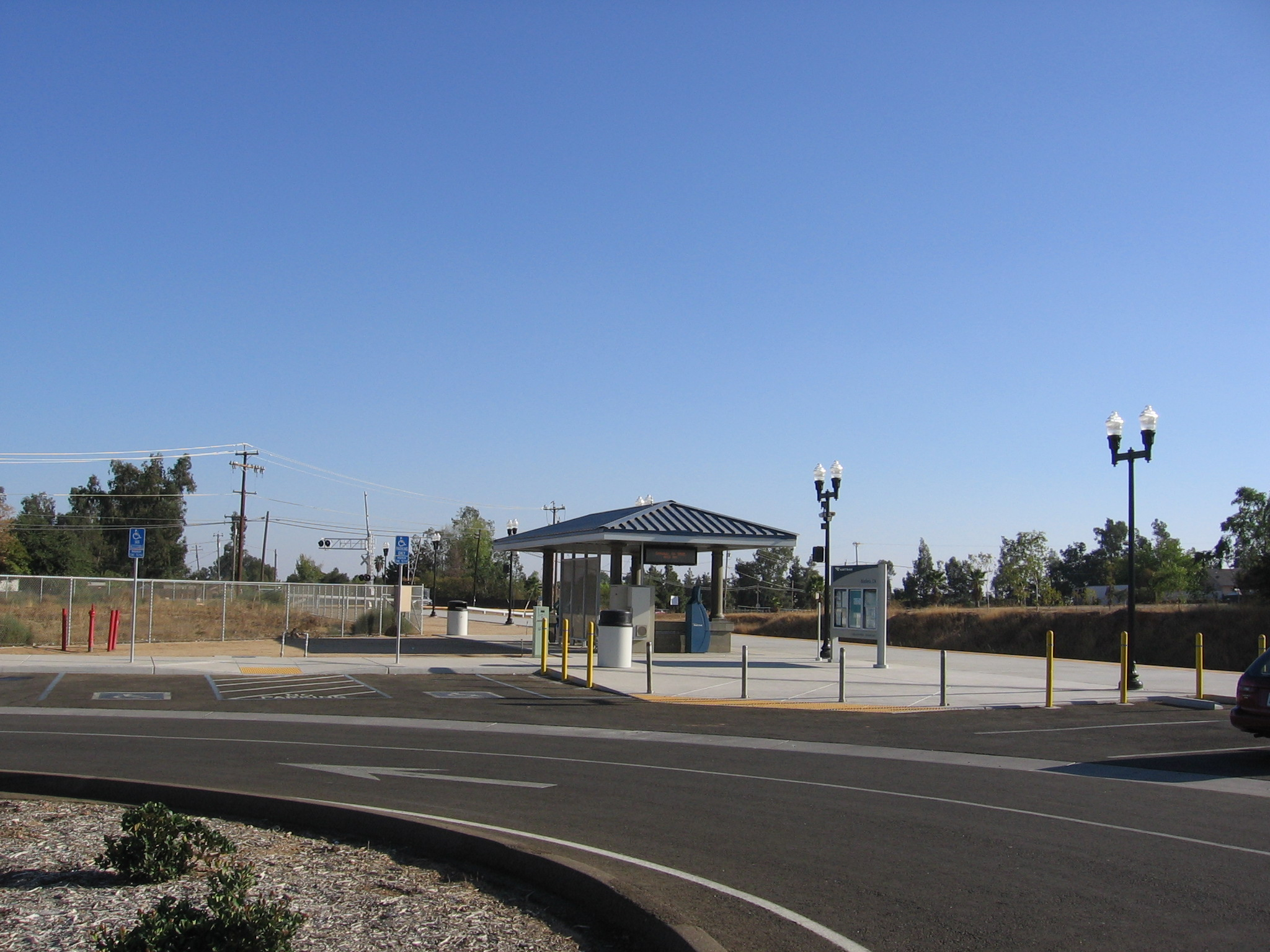
- Madera station in October 2012 (before the addition of the bathroom building)

General information
- Location: 18770 Road 26; Madera, California; United States
- Coordinates: 37°01′21″N 120°04′30″W
- Owner: County of Madera
- Line: BNSF Stockton Subdivision
- Platforms: 1 side platform
- Tracks: 1

Construction
- Structure type: At-grade
- Parking: 32 spaces (2 reserved for persons with disabilities and 2 reserved for electric vehicle charging)
- Accessible: Yes

Other information
- Status: Unstaffed
- Station code: Amtrak: MDR

History
- Opened: November 4, 2010

Passengers
- FY 2025: 25,476 (Amtrak)

Services
Preceding station	Amtrak	Following station
Merced toward Oakland or Sacramento	Gold Runner	Fresno toward Bakersfield
Location

Madera station is an unstaffed train station near Madera, California, United States that is served by Gold Runner trains, which run between Oakland or Sacramento and Bakersfield, California.

== Description ==
The station is located at 18770 Road 26, approximately 2.5 miles (4.0 km) north of the city limits of Madera, and immediately north of the boundary of Madera Acres.

The station has a single track with a side platform. The station has a payphone, Quik-Trak automated ticket kiosk, restrooms, and two shelters, but no indoor waiting area. An unattended 32-space parking lot is available at the station, with 2 spaces reserved for persons with disabled parking permits and 2 reserved for electric vehicle charging.

Of the 78 California stations regularly served by Amtrak, Madera was the 51st-busiest in Fiscal Year 2013, boarding or detraining an average of approximately 75 passengers daily.

== History ==
For over a hundred years, the area was served by the former Storey train station, about 2.5 miles (4.0 km) east-northeast of Madera in the community of Storey. When Amtrak took over nearly all passenger rail service in the United States in 1971, there was no longer any passenger service to the area. Amtrak resumed passenger rail served to Storey station (which Amtrak called Madera) with the San Joaquins on October 30, 1977. Although Amtrak substantially improved the conditions at Storey station, after about dozen years of service, official discussion began regarding improving the station. As the project plans developed over the next decade, the option of an entirely new station was selected over improvements to the existing one. Nearly all evidence of the former Madera (Storey) station has been entirely removed.

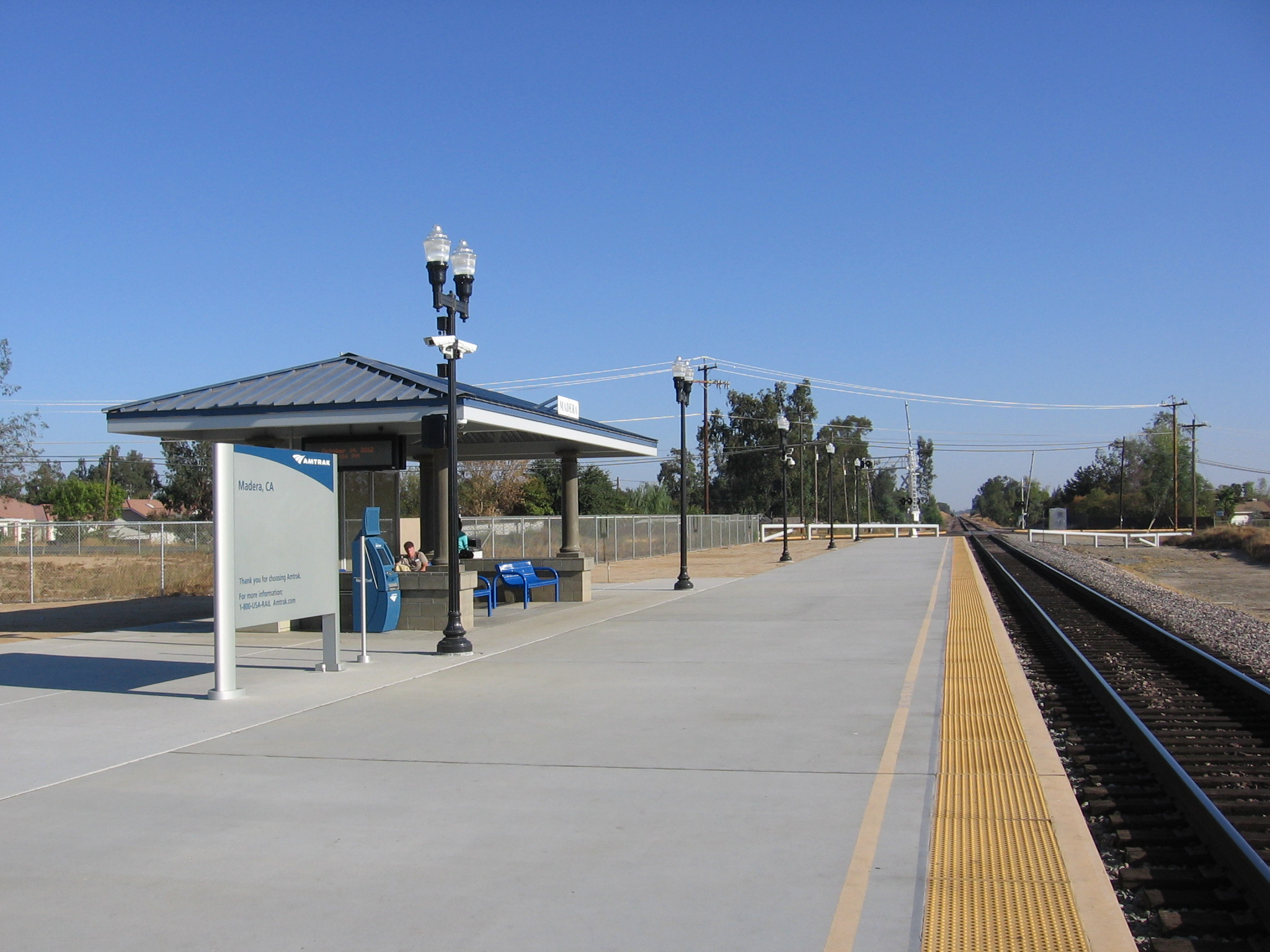
Madera station passenger platform

In August 2010, ground was broken on this new station. The grand opening of the new Amtrak station took place on November 4, 2010, with regular service beginning the 8th. The $2 million station project, which included a new platform, shelter, lighting, access road and landscaping, involved the city of Madera, Amtrak, BNSF Railway and Caltrans. Funding came from Madera County's 2006 Measure T (which created a 0.5% transportation improvement sales tax), the state of California and the California Transportation Commission. Over the next three years, the new station saw a nearly 25% increase in ridership and received additional improvements to the station, including solar panels.

Since the new station opened, service by the San Joaquin had increased substantially from the once daily runs in each direction. By 2010 the San Joaquin ran twice daily (in each direction) between Sacramento and Bakersfield and four times daily (in each direction) between Oakland and Bakersfield.

=== Future ===
The April 2016 revisions to California High-Speed Rail's business plan proposed a relocated Madera station. The addition was partially the result of comments from the public review period. Several Madera County officials praised the addition of the high-speed rail stop.

Funding for the new station was provided as part of the Valley Rail project in 2018. Work on station relocation is ongoing as of November 2019, as the San Joaquin Joint Powers Authority has entered into negotiations with CAHSR, Madera County, and the city of Madera.
