= Fresno Area Express =

Public transit agency of Fresno, California

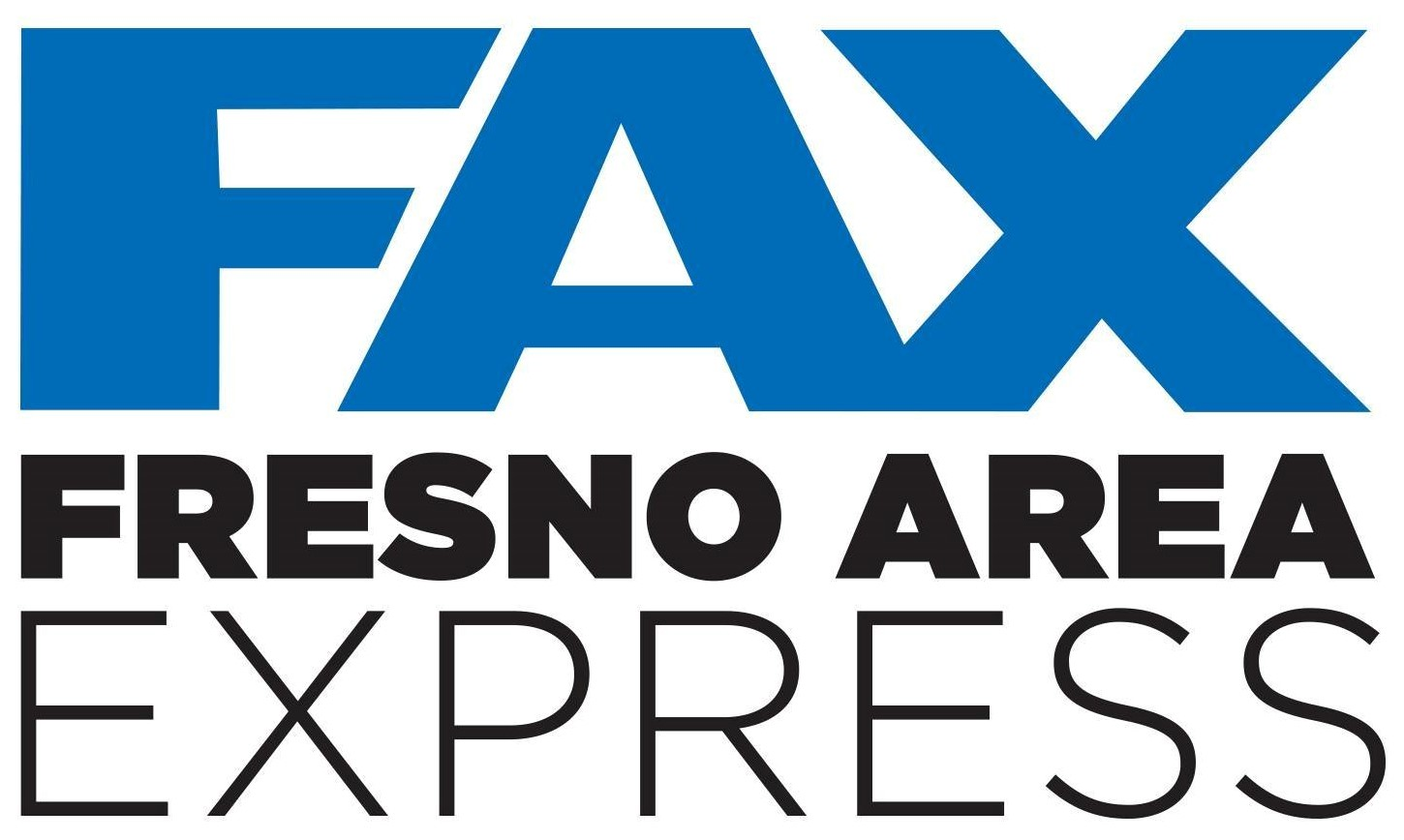

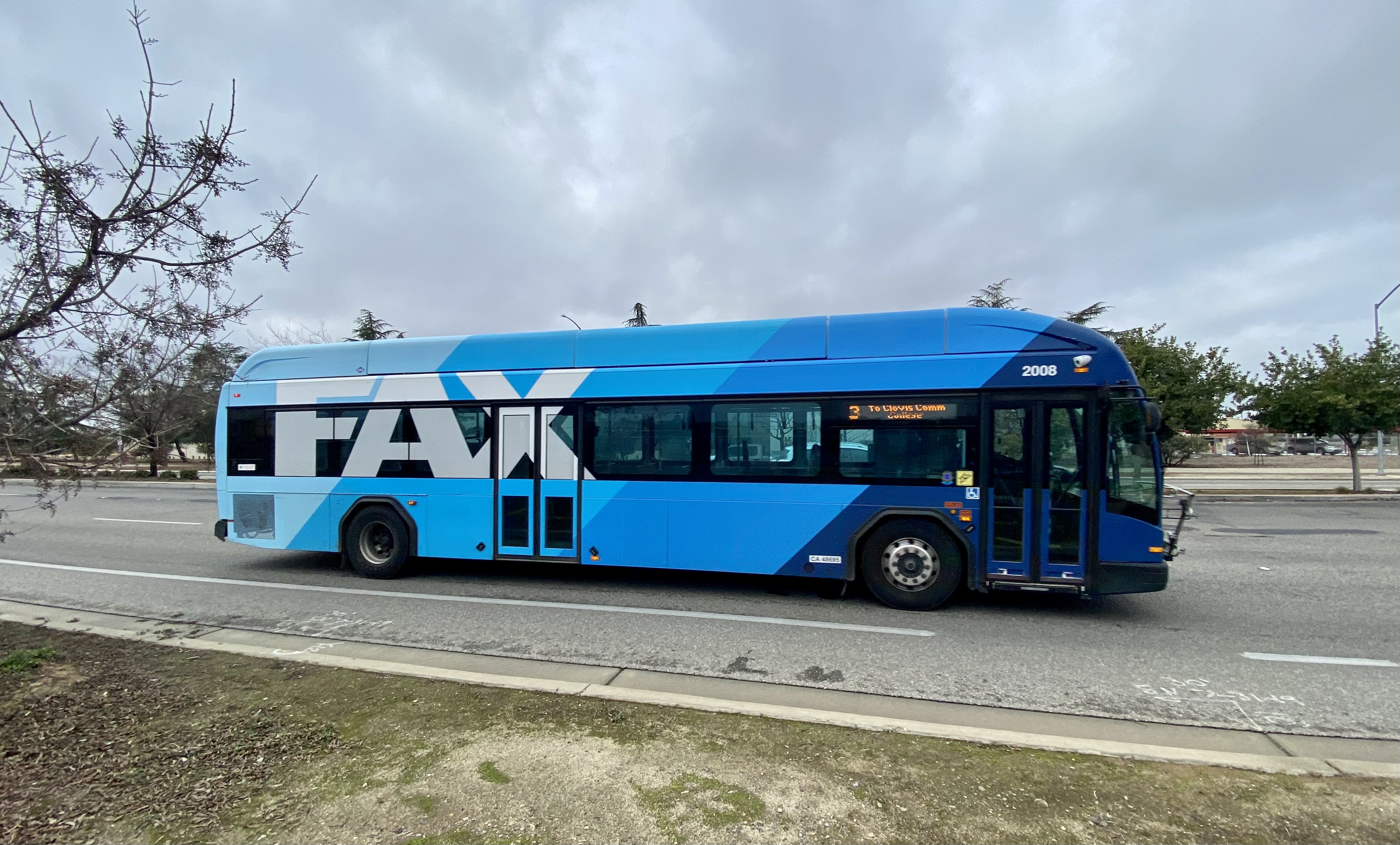
- FAX bus operating on Route 3 in January 2022
- Parent: City of Fresno Department of Transportation
- Founded: 1887
- Service area: Fresno and Clovis, California
- Service type: Bus service, paratransit
- Routes: 19
- Stops: 1,606
- Hubs: 2 (Downtown, Manchester)
- Fleet: 124 buses
- Daily ridership: 39,600 (weekdays, Q2 2026)
- Annual ridership: 10,476,400 (2025)
- Fuel type: CNG, battery-electric, hydrogen
- Website: fresno.gov/fax
System map (January 2026)

Fresno Area Express (FAX) is a public transportation operator in Fresno, California. As of August 2025, the system had 19 routes, over 100 buses, and over 1,600 bus stops. In 2025, the system had a ridership of 10,476,400, or about 39,600 per weekday as of the second quarter of 2026. FAX fixed routes run as far south as Malaga to Valley Children's Hospital in the north. Lines also run as far east as Fowler Avenue and as far west as Hayes Avenue near Highway 99 in western Fresno.

FAX has paratransit operations called Handy Ride, operated by a private contractor. FAX offers free transfers as well as wheelchair lifts and bike racks on all buses.

== History ==
The public transportation system in Fresno started in January 1889 with horse-drawn streetcars. By 1901, lines had been established on Fulton, Fresno, and Mariposa Streets, which merged into the Fresno City Railway Company. The company was renamed the Fresno Traction Company in 1903 as employees began the process of converting the lines to electric streetcars. These electric streetcars operated on approximately 42 miles of track by the mid-1920s.

In 1939, the streetcar system was purchased by National City Lines, known for its role in the General Motors streetcar conspiracy. The company renamed the system Fresno City Lines, and like the other lines it purchased around the nation, National City Lines started to replace Fresno's rail system with buses and all streetcar operations ended on May 20, 1939.

The city of Fresno took control of Fresno City Lines in 1961, renaming it Fresno Municipal Lines. The system would be renamed Fresno Transit in 1969 and received its current name, Fresno Area Express or FAX, in 1989.

In 2001, FAX started the process of converting its fleet to be fueled by compressed natural gas (CNG), a process that was expected to take about 10 years.

In January 2017, the agency introduced FAX15, a frequent bus service, on the Shaw Avenue and Cedar Avenue corridors. On these lines, buses arrive every 15 minutes on weekdays between 6 am and 6 pm. Bus stops along the FAX15 lines were improved in 2022 and 2023. A third FAX15 route along the 1st Street corridor was added in August 2023 and a fourth along Clinton Avenue in August 2026.

FAX Q, a frequent bus service that the agency brands as bus rapid transit, opened on February 19, 2018. The 15.7-mile (25.3 km) line operates on the Blackstone and Ventura/Kings Canyon transit corridors and cost US$56 million to build.

The agency started the process of converting to a zero tailpipe emission fleet in 2021, with the introduction of two battery-electric buses in late 2021. As of May 1, 2024, all nine battery-electric buses were out of service. The agency also plans to purchase hydrogen fuel cell buses. FAX expects to purchase its last CNG-fueled buses in 2027, and retire them by 2040.

== Routes ==
As of June 2026, the Fresno Area Express system had 19 routes.

Route	Service type	North or west terminal	Destinations served	South or east terminal
1 – Q Bus Rapid Transit	Q BRT	Woodward Park (Fresno & Friant)	River Park, Manchester Transit Center, Fresno City College, Downtown Transit Center, Fresno Fairgrounds	Sunnyside (Kings Canyon & Clovis)
3 – Herndon	Regular	Marketplace at El Paseo (Herndon & Riverside)	Sierra Sky Park Airport, Saint Agnes Medical Center, Clovis North Educational Center	Clovis Community College (Willow & International)
9 – Shaw	FAX 15	Shaw & Brawley	Fig Garden Shopping Center, Fashion Fair, Fresno State	Shaw & Willow
12 – Brawley	Regular	Shaw & Brawley	Central High School East Campus, Inspiration Park, Forestiere Underground Gardens	Brawley & Shields
20 – Hughes/McKinley	Regular	Marketplace at El Paseo (Herndon & Riverside)	Fresno High School, Fresno City College	VA Medical Center (Fresno Street & Clinton)
22 – West Ave/Tulare	Regular	West & Bullard	Fig Garden Library, Downtown Transit Center, Santa Fe Passenger Depot	Clovis & Kings Canyon
26 – Palm/Butler	Regular	Nees & Blackstone	Bullard High School, Fresno High School, Tower District, Downtown Transit Center, Fresno Fairgrounds, Mosqueda Community Center, Fresno Pacific University	Fresno Yosemite International Airport
28 – DSS/Manchester Center/West Fresno	Regular	County of Fresno Clovis Campus (Dakota & Peach)	Manchester Transit Center, Fresno City College, Fresno High School, Fresno Chandler Executive Airport	Crystal & Kearney
29 – Church Ave	Regular	Hinton Center (Church & Fairview)	West Fresno Branch Library, Edison High School, Fresno City College–West Fresno Center	Sanger West High School (Church & Jensen)
32 – Fresno St	Regular	River Park (El Paso & Blackstone) Downtown Transit Center (late nights)	Kaiser Hospital, VA Medical Center, Community Regional Medical Center, Downtown Transit Center	North & Elm
33 – Belmont	Regular	Belmont & Delno	Roeding Park, Fresno Chaffee Zoo	Maple & Butler
34 – 1st St	FAX 15	River Park (El Paso & Blackstone)	River Park, Saint Agnes Medical Center, Politi Library, Hoover High School, Fashion Fair, Downtown Transit Center	North Pointe Business Park
35 – Olive	Regular	Brawley & Shields	Roeding Park, Tower District	Olive & Peach
38 – Cedar	FAX 15	River Park (El Paso & Blackstone)	River Park, Fresno State University, Duncan Polytechnical High School, McLane High School, Roosevelt High School	Downtown Transit Center
39 – FYI/Clinton	FAX 15	Shields & Brawley	VA Medical Center, McLane High School	Fresno Yosemite International Airport
41 – Malaga/Shields/Chestnut	Regular	Marks & Shaw	Manchester Transit Center, Fresno Pacific University	Grand & Harding
45 – Ashlan	Regular	Justin Garza High School	Central High School East Campus	Shields & Stanford
58 – NE Fresno	Regular	River Park (El Paso & Blackstone)	Clovis West High School, Woodward Park Regional Library	Champlain & Perrin
58E – Children's Hospital	Express	Valley Children's Hospital	(no stops; connects to Madera County Connection at Valley Children's Hospital)	River Park (El Paso & Blackstone)

=== Transit centers ===
Fresno Area Express has two primary transit centers, hubs where passengers can transfer between several routes. The Manchester Transit Center is located on the west side of Blackstone Avenue and is served by routes 1, 28 and 41, additionally, it is the location of the FAX Customer Service Center. The Downtown Transit Center is located at Courthouse Park and is served by routes 1, 22, 26, 28, 32, 34 and 38, along with the Fresno County Rural Transit Agency's Coalinga, Orange Cove, Southeast and Westside routes, along with Visalia Transit's V-LINE service.

== Fleet ==
As of April 2026, Fresno Area Express has a fleet of 124 buses, with 110 needed for service on weekdays and 77 on weekends. The buses in the spare fleet are used when necessary to cover for buses that need to be taken out of service for maintenance.

The fleet primarily consists of 40-foot buses powered by CNG-fueled engines, but there are also three 29-foot buses for use on low-ridership routes and 6 Hydrogen Fuel cell buses as the agency continues its transition to a zero-tailpipe emissions fleet.

9 Battery electric buses had been sidelined due to breakdowns and part shortages because of the builder, Proterra filing for bankruptcy in 2023.

Model	Length	Fleet #	Qty.	Year	Power type	Notes	Image
New Flyer C40LFR	40'	0901–0916	16	2009	CNG		
New Flyer C40LFR	40'	1301–1311	11	2013	CNG	Refurbished buses acquired from Valley Metro 5000 series.	
Gillig Low Floor BRT	40'	1101	1	2011	CNG		
Gillig Low Floor BRT	40'	1102–1109	8	2012	CNG		
Gillig Low Floor BRT	29'	1201–1203	3	2012	CNG	Used on Route 33 and 58/58E only	
Gillig Low Floor BRT	40'	1401–1410	10	2014	CNG		
Gillig Low Floor BRT	40'	1612–1617	6	2016	CNG		
Gillig Low Floor BRT Plus	40'	1601–1611	11	2016	CNG	Used on FAX15 routes.	
Gillig Low Floor BRT Plus	40'	1701–1726	26	2017	CNG	1701–1708 used on FAX15 routes. 1709–1726 used on FAX Q route.	
Gillig Low Floor BRT Plus	40'	1801	1	2018	CNG		
Gillig Low Floor BRT Plus	40'	1905–1906	2	2019	CNG		
Gillig Low Floor BRT Plus	40'	2001–2008	8	2020	CNG		
Gillig Low Floor BRT Plus	40'	2103–2108	6	2021	CNG		
Gillig Low Floor BRT Plus	40'	2403–2414	12	2024	CNG		
Gillig Low Floor BRT Plus	40'	2605–2615	11	2026	CNG		
Proterra ZX5	40'	2101–2102	2	2021	Battery electric	Sidelined.	
Proterra ZX5	40'	2201–2207	7	2022	Battery electric	Sidelined.	
New Flyer XHE40	40'	2401–2402	2	2024	Hydrogen		
New Flyer XHE40	40'	2601–2604	4	2025	Hydrogen		
