= Storey station =

Railway station in California, the United States of America

Madera, CA
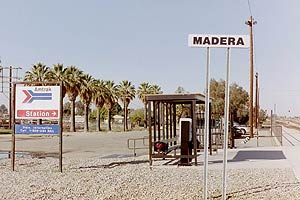
- Former Madera station in Storey in December 2001

General information
- Location: Avenue 15½ at 29th Road; Storey, California; United States
- Coordinates: 36°58′34″N 120°01′14″W
- Line: BNSF Stockton Subdivision
- Platforms: 1 side platform
- Tracks: 1

Construction
- Parking: 15 spaces
- Accessible: yes

Other information
- Station code: MDR

History
- Opened: 1896; October 30, 1977
- Closed: 1971, November 8, 2010

Passengers
- FY2010: 20,031 (Amtrak)

Former services
Preceding station	Amtrak	Following station
Merced toward Oakland or Sacramento	San Joaquins	Fresno toward Bakersfield
Preceding station	Atchison, Topeka and Santa Fe Railway	Following station
Kismet toward Richmond	Valley Division	Trigo toward Barstow
Location

Storey (known as Madera by Amtrak) was an unstaffed train station located in the unincorporated community of Storey, (Note: The unincorporated community of Storey is located about two 2.5 miles (4.0 km) east-northeast of downtown area of the city of Madera) and about 1 mile (1.6 km) southeast of the Fresno River, in Madera County, California, United States. Just prior to its closure in November 2010 and replacement by the new Madera station, this station was served by Amtrak's (the National Railroad Passenger Corporation) San Joaquin. Prior to Amtrak, this station was also previously served by Atchison, Topeka and Santa Fe Railroad's (ATSF) San Francisco Chief and its Oakland-Barstow Line.

== Description ==
The Storey Station (Madera) was located at Avenue 15½ at 29th Road. (Note: In the area north of the intersection of Avenue 15½ and Road 29 (as of 2014) there are two sets of four metal silos along the northeast side of the tracks (north of Avenue 15½). Amtrak's former Madera Station was located directly across the tracks from the northwest set of silos. (Google Street View [2007 view] shows the Amtrak sign at the turnoff to the station.)) Prior to its removal (following its closure in 2010) the station had one side platform on the southwest side of the southwest track. (Note: Along what was formerly the ATSF line, in the area of Storey, there is a short section that has two tracks and an even shorter section in the immediate area of the former station with three tracks.) In addition to the passenger platform, the station included a payphone, a bench, and a parking area with about fifteen spaces on a hard surface. There was also a lighted sign that would indicate when trains were coming. As of 2001, there was a bus-stop like shelter (Note: Such shelters, like the one that was located at the former Madera station for a time, were often referred to as an "Amshak") protecting the bench, but by 2008 the shelter had been removed. Unlike the Southern Pacific Railroad (SP) that built a train depot in downtown Madera, (Note: With the inception of Amtrak in 1971, the Southern Pacific Depot closed and remained vacant for many years. However, by 2001 it was refurbished and is now the home for the offices of the Madera Chamber of Commerce.) the ATSF never constructed a depot for the Storey Station. Instead, the Storey Station was operated as a flag stop for all ATSF trains. Passengers would signal their desire to board an approaching train by waving a flag. The original station, as well as the local area, was named after William Benson Storey, the former president of the ATSF.

Of the 73 California stations regularly served by Amtrak in the Fiscal Year 2010, Madera (Storey) was the 49th-busiest, boarding or detraining an average of approximately 55 passengers daily.

== History ==
The station was originally "built" (in a sense) by the San Francisco and San Joaquin Valley Railroad (SF&SJV) when it laid its tracks through the area in 1896. However, since there was never depot building, it is not possible to establish a precise completion date for the original station. Several years after the track were completed the ATSF acquired the SF&SJV, and was part of their Valley Division.

From its beginning until Amtrak took over nearly all passenger rail service within the United States in 1971, the station was served by ATSF trains, including the famous San Francisco Chief and the Oakland-Barstow line. During this time the "station" consisted of not much more than a sign along the tracks indicating where the train would stop, if it was effectively flagged. From Amtrak's inception until 1977, Storey had no rail service. Although the station never had more than the limited facilities, when Amtrak brought passenger service back to the station 1977 the conditions at the station improved considerably.

From 1977 to 2010 the station was served by Amtrak/Amtrak California's San Joaquin. Initially, service only included daily service (once in each direction) between Oakland (16th Street Station) and Bakersfield. In 1994 the Oakland 16th Street Station was closed due to damaged caused by the 1989 Loma Prieta earthquake and the new northern terminus was temporarily moved to the Emeryville Station. In 1996, the northern terminus was moved back to Oakland (Jack London Square Station). By 2002, service on the San Joaquin had increased substantially and it began running twice daily (in each direction) between Sacramento and Bakersfield and four times daily (in each direction) between Oakland and Bakersfield. (For all trains, the next northbound stop was in Merced and the next southbound stop was in Fresno.) When service first began in 1977 it was designated as an "experimental stop", but by 1980 the experimental stop note no longer appeared in the timetables.

=== Replacement ===
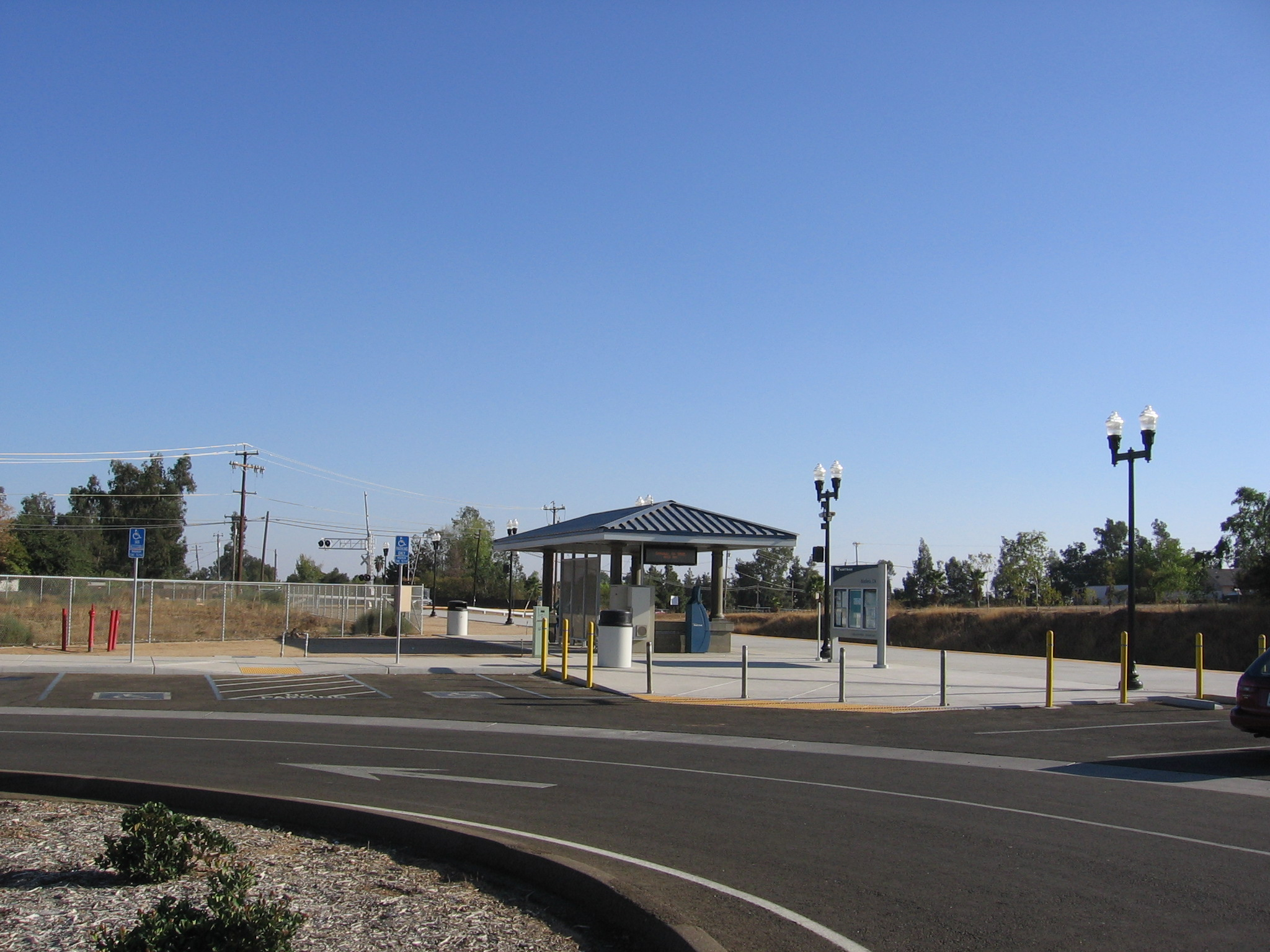
The new Madera station, October 2012

In the early 2000s, official discussion began regarding improving the Madera station, but took nearly a decade for any action. As the project plans developed, the option of an entirely new station was selected over improvements to the former station. In August 2010, ground was broken on a new station located approximately 3 miles (4.8 km) north of the City of Madera. Grand opening of the new Madera Amtrak station took place a few months later on November 4, 2010. The $2 million station project, initially included a new platform, shelter, lighting, access road and landscaping, involved the city of Madera, Amtrak, BNSF Railway, and Caltrans. Funding came from Madera County’s “Measure T,” a ½ cent transportation improvement sales tax, the state of California and the California Transportation Commission. On November 8 the new station opened for service and the former Madera (Storey) station was permanently closed. Over the next three years, the new station saw a nearly 25 percent increase in ridership and received additional improvements to the station. Since being replaced, all evidence of the former Story (Madera) station has been entirely removed.
