= Fresno City Hall =

- Interactive map of the Fresno City Hall area

General information
- Type: Government offices
- Architectural style: Post-modern futurism
- Location: 2600 Fresno Street; Fresno, California
- Coordinates: 36.7395°N 119.7847°W
- Completed: 1991; 35 years ago
- Cost: US$28 million
- Owner: City of Fresno

Height
- Height: 95 ft (29 m)
- Roof: 20.21 m (66.3 ft)

Technical details
- Floor count: 5
- Floor area: 300,000 ft^{2} (28,000 m^{2})
- Lifts/elevators: 4

Design and construction
- Architect: Arthur Erickson

Fresno City Hall is a post-modern futurist structure in Fresno, California, designed by architect Arthur Erickson. The building serves as the seat of the city government and houses the mayor's office and the Fresno City Council chambers.

== Architecture ==
Canadian architect Arthur Erickson designed the look of the City Hall building for local architect William Patnaude. Erickson also designed One California Plaza in Los Angeles, California and the Embassy of Canada in Washington, D.C., among other notable works. The Fresno City Hall building anchors the northern end of the "Mariposa Mall", a twelve-block civic corridor which ends with the Fresno County Courthouse on the southern end.

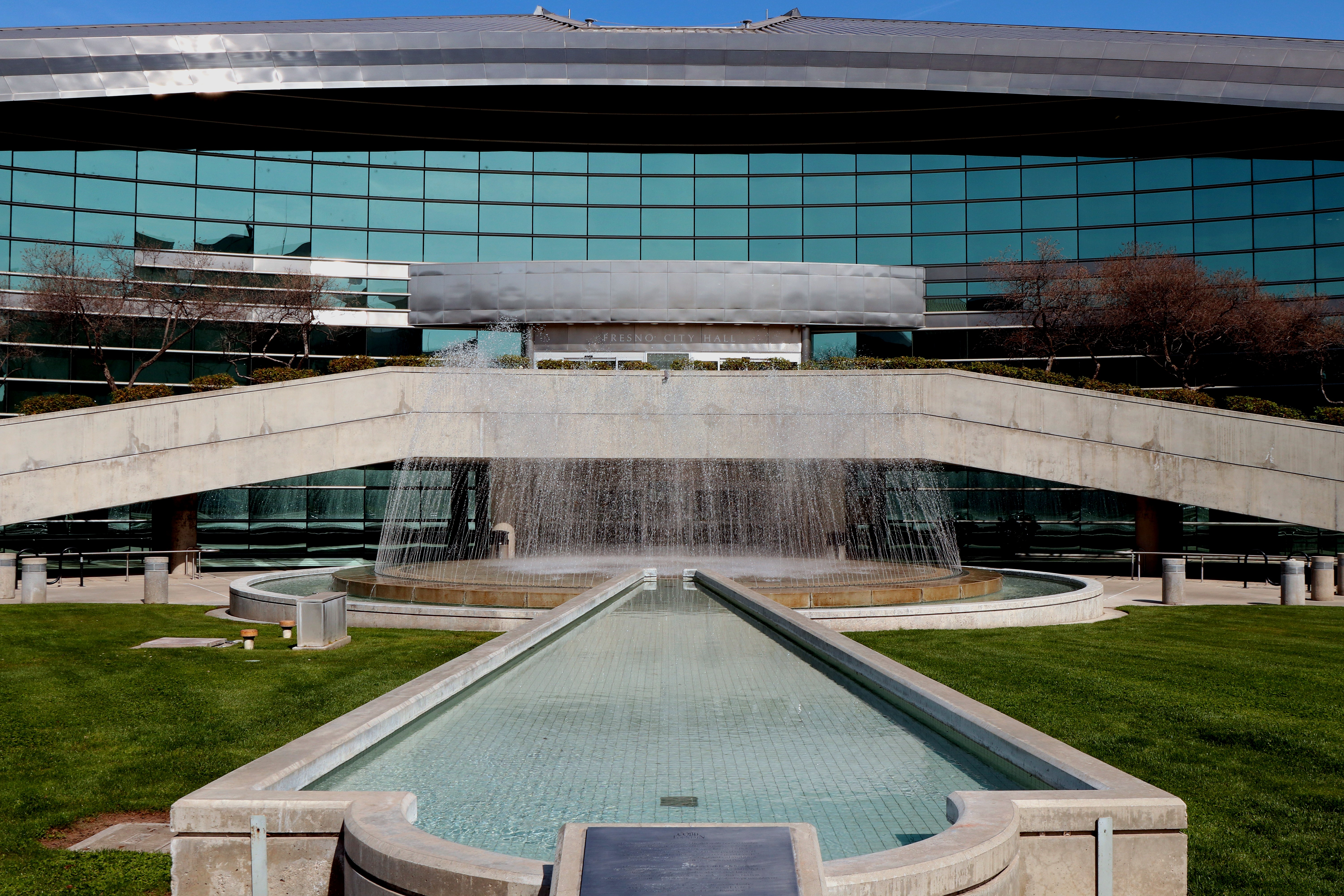
View of the fountain

The exterior is post-modern futurist in style and consists of dull-finished stainless steel and glass panels with an angular roofline, meant to evoke the peaks of the nearby Sierra Nevada mountains. The building is five stories in total. The central interior space is the council chamber, but it also houses the mayor's office, the finance department, the public works department, the economic resources department and other offices. The council chamber has public seating with a capacity for 249 people. The chamber also features natural light coming in through a skylight located in the gap between the two peaks.

There is a large fountain in the center of the dual stairways leading up to the main public entrance. The fountain was initially eliminated from the project due to budgetary concerns, but the Cobb family, early settlers of the Fresno area who opened successful businesses, donated $100,000 for the fountain. Other donors also contributed to keep the fountain as part of the project.

== History ==
=== Early City Halls ===
Fresno has occupied multiple city hall buildings since its inception. The first permanent city hall was completed in 1907 at Merced and Broadway streets, across from the Hotel Fresno. The construction was spearheaded by Mayor W. Parker Lyon.

The building across from Hotel Fresno operated for 34 years until a new city hall, four times larger, was completed in 1941. This two-story, L-shaped building was designed by architect Ernest J. Kump and located at Fresno and M streets. The building later became known as "Old City Hall" and was placed on Fresno's Register of Historic Places.

The 1907 city hall building was later demolished in 1961.

=== Current City Hall ===
Amid the continued growth of Fresno, a committee to study city operations space needs was formed. The committee issued a report in March 1986, calling current office conditions intolerable and urging immediate steps to build a new city hall. It took two years to secure funding and to scope the project, but the city council awarded a $2.7 million design contract to architect William Patnaude for the building in 1988. Patnaude enlisted Arthur Erickson for creating the look of the building. Erickson had won an AIA Gold Medal award a few years earlier for his lifetime body of work in architecture.

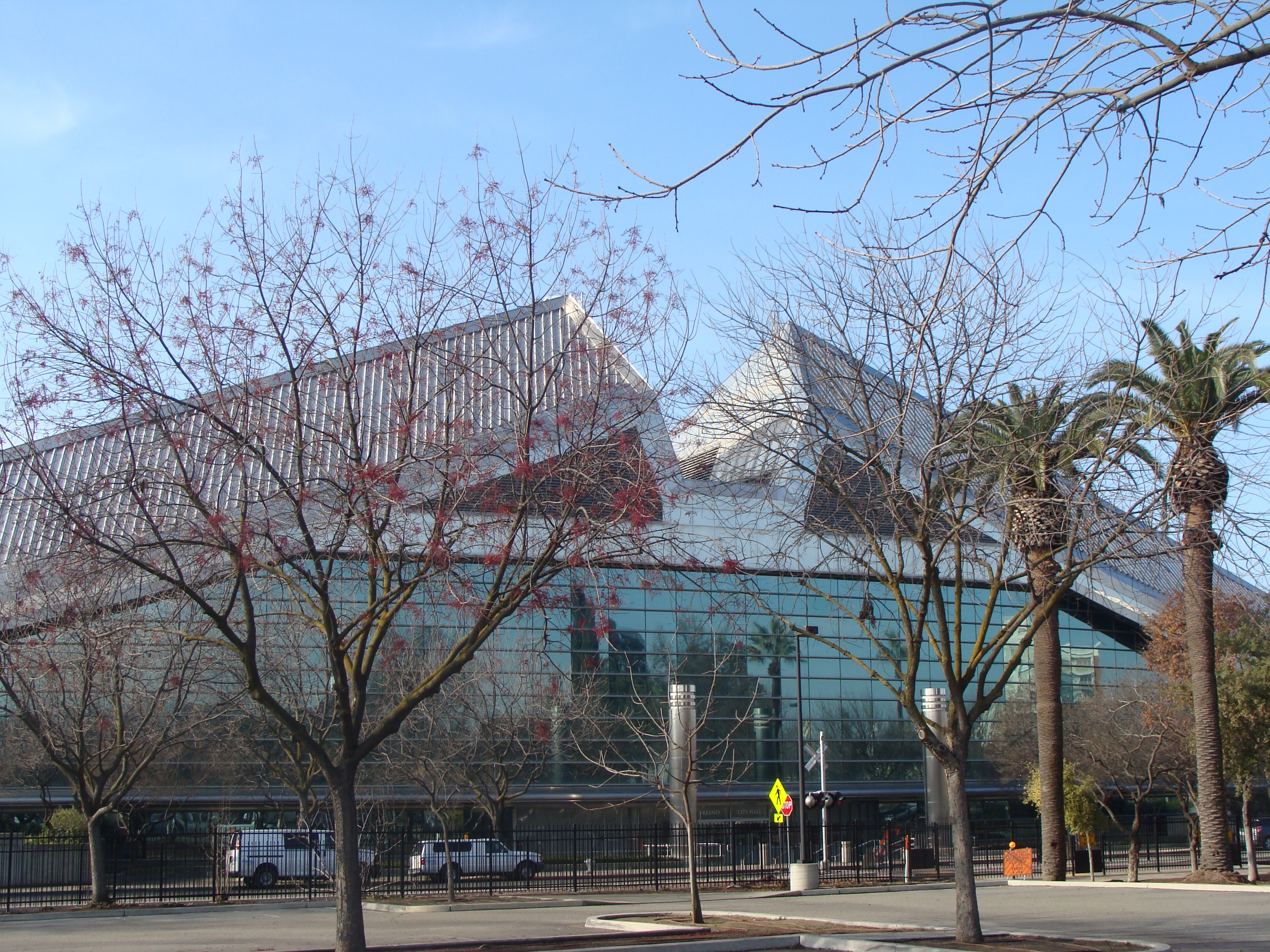
Rear view of the city hall building exterior

The original architectural design included a three-story arch in the middle and a massive vertical façade. Preliminary cost estimating determined that this arch design would end up over-budget. A new design featuring a large sloping roof and two separate peaks in the center was presented to the city council and approved with a vote of 4-2. Dissenting councilman Tom McMichael voiced his concerns, saying "this looks like a Klingon warship. I thought the arch was kind of a nice building."

The design met with mixed reviews. The deputy city manager said "we've heard it described as anything from Twin Peaks to Madonna's bra to a half-opened tuna can, as one man called it." The local American Institute of Architects chapter president had a more positive review, saying "I think it is a great building for the city. It does a wonderful thing for architecture because it is so controversial."

The building dedication ceremony occurred on February 17, 1992, Presidents' Day. It was attended by Lieutenant Governor of California Leo T. McCarthy, as well as architect Arthur Erickson, California assemblymen Jim Costa, Bill Jones and Bruce Bronzan.

The New Deal era building which no longer housed the city council became known as "Old City Hall", and was converted to an annex.

The building was used as a filming location for the 1994 science-fiction movie The Puppet Masters, with the exterior serving as Des Moines City Hall.

A time capsule was placed within a wall at City Hall when it was initially constructed, to be opened 30 years later. In December 2022, Mayor Jerry Dyer and city council members gathered for the opening and unveiling of the time capsule. It included newspapers, VHS and cassette tapes, old coins, and various other memorabilia from the time, including a figurine of The California Raisins. The capsule was re-filled and marked to be opened in 2052.
