= Sierra Vista Mall =

- Location: Clovis, California
- Address: 1050 Shaw Avenue
- Opened: 1988; 38 years ago
- Developer: The Hahn Company
- Manager: Namdar Realty Group
- Owner: Namdar Realty Group
- Num. of anchor tenants: 7 (5 open, 2 vacant)
- Floor area: 690,487 square feet (64,148.3 m^{2})
- Floors: 1
- Parking: 3,878 parking spaces

Sierra Vista Mall is an enclosed shopping mall in Clovis, California. Opened in 1988, the mall features Kohl's, and Target, plus a go-kart track, indoor Laser Tag park, and 16-screen movie theater. Two empty anchors were formerly occupied by Sears (closed April 18, 2021), and United Artists Theaters (closed December 14, 2006).

== History ==
Sierra Vista Mall was built in 1988 by the Hahn Company. While early plans called for both May Co. and Macy's stores, the original anchor stores were Mervyn's, Gottschalks, and Target. The mall was sold to Citicorp in 1995 and again to LandValue in 2002. A Sears was added in 1999 along with 10 other stores.

In 2006, an outdoor lifestyle center section was added, including several restaurants and a 16-screen movie theater. Both Mervyn's and Gottschalks closed when the chains declared bankruptcy, in 2008 and 2009 respectively. causing a decrease in mall foot traffic. The Gottschalks store was intended to reopen in 2010 as a flagship for a failed revival of the chain.

Kohl's replaced the Mervyn's in 2010, and an indoor go-kart track replaced part of the former Gottschalks in 2014. The mall was sold at a foreclosure auction for $39 million to LNR Property LLC in January 2015. No Surrender Laser Tag & Adventure Park moved from their location across town to the rest of the former Gottschalks store in 2017.

In recent years, the mall has struggled to attract and retain tenants, with many major chains, including Sunglass Hut, PacSun, Foot Locker, and Wet Seal, leaving the mall. National chains currently remaining include Bath & Body Works, Claire's, and Famous Footwear.

Multiple stores closed in the mall after the 2018 holiday season, including Sunglass Hut, Payless Shoesource, Blast Pizza, and Things Remembered, among other less known shops.

In early 2020, the mall's Starbucks closed, relocating to a freestanding drive-thru building across the street. Closures continued into the start of the 2020 holiday shopping season, with Victoria's Secret, New York & Company, and GNC among those closing.

On January 29, 2021, it was announced that Sears would be closing on April 18, 2021, as part of a plan to close 23 stores nationwide which will leave Kohl's and Target as the only traditional anchors left. The store closed permanently on April 18, 2021.
