= Hotel Fresno =

- U.S. National Register of Historic Places
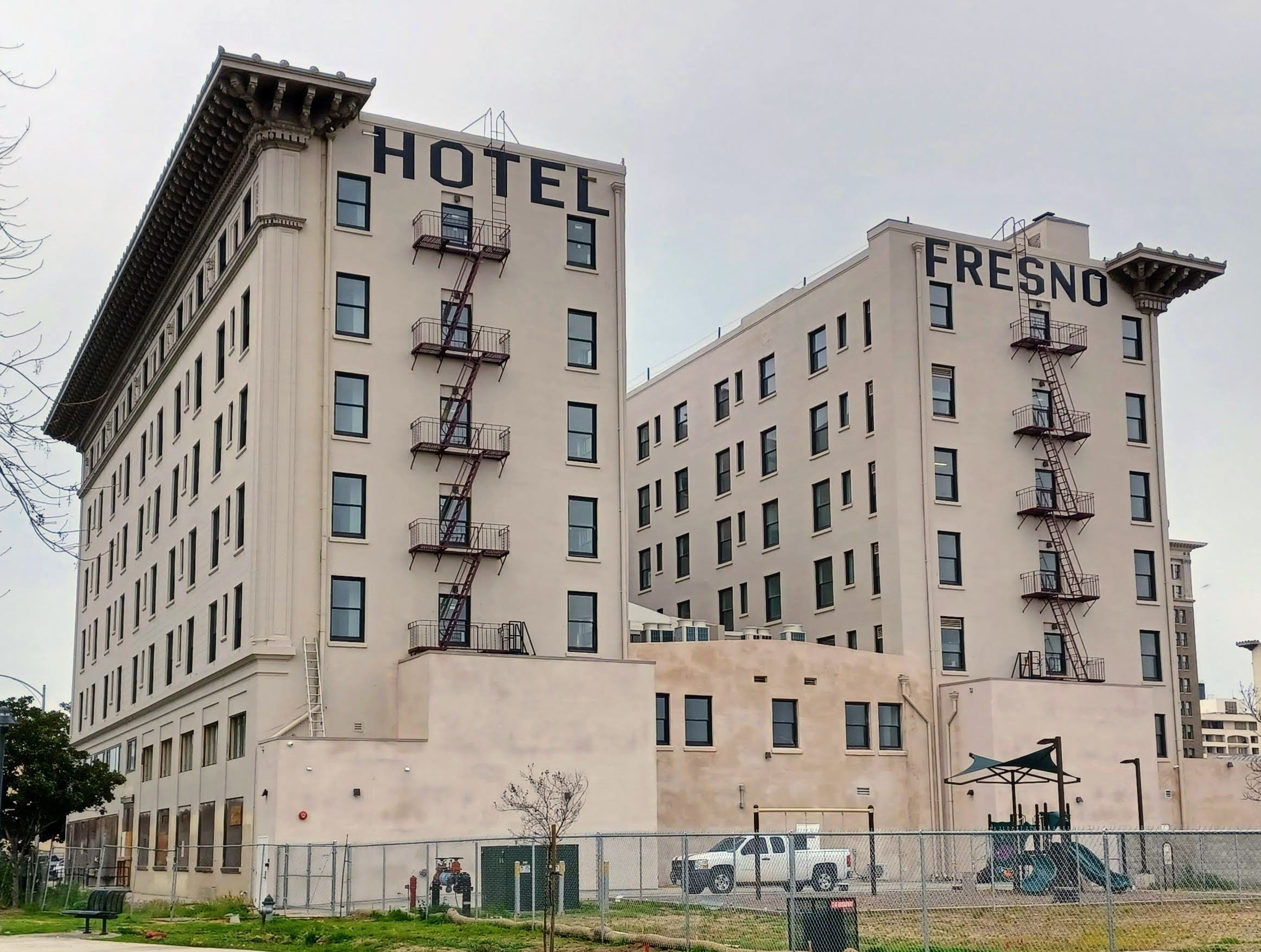
- rear view with "Hotel Fresno" signage on the exterior wall

- Location within California
- Location: 1241-1263 Broadway Plz., Fresno, California
- Coordinates: 36°44′09″N 119°47′38″W
- Area: 2.91 acres (1.18 ha)
- Built: 1912
- Architect: Edward T. Foukes
- NRHP reference No.: 100002910
- Added to NRHP: September 13, 2018

The Hotel Fresno is a historic hotel located at 1241-1263 Broadway Plaza in downtown Fresno, California. It is the oldest surviving hotel in the city, built in 1912. It was listed on the National Register of Historic Places in 2018.

The hotel was designed by architect Edward T. Foulkes and has been described as Neoclassical in style, with elements of Second Renaissance Revival and Beaux Arts styles. Its design "was reportedly adapted from that of the Palace Hotel in San Francisco, known for its crystal-roofed garden court." The Palace Hotel was built in 1875, and was rebuilt in 1909 after destruction in the 1906 San Francisco earthquake.

Architectural historian John Edward Powell describes it as having "adopted the 'caravansary' model, that is, a design around a centralized interior court or atrium lobby at first floor."

The hotel closed in 1983 due to "repairs", and remained vacant for 41 years. Starting mid-2019, the building went under renovation to become affordable housing for 79 families until finally reopening in October 2024.
