= Woodward Park (Fresno) =

Public park located in Fresno, California, US

Coordinates: 36.8708°N 119.7845°W

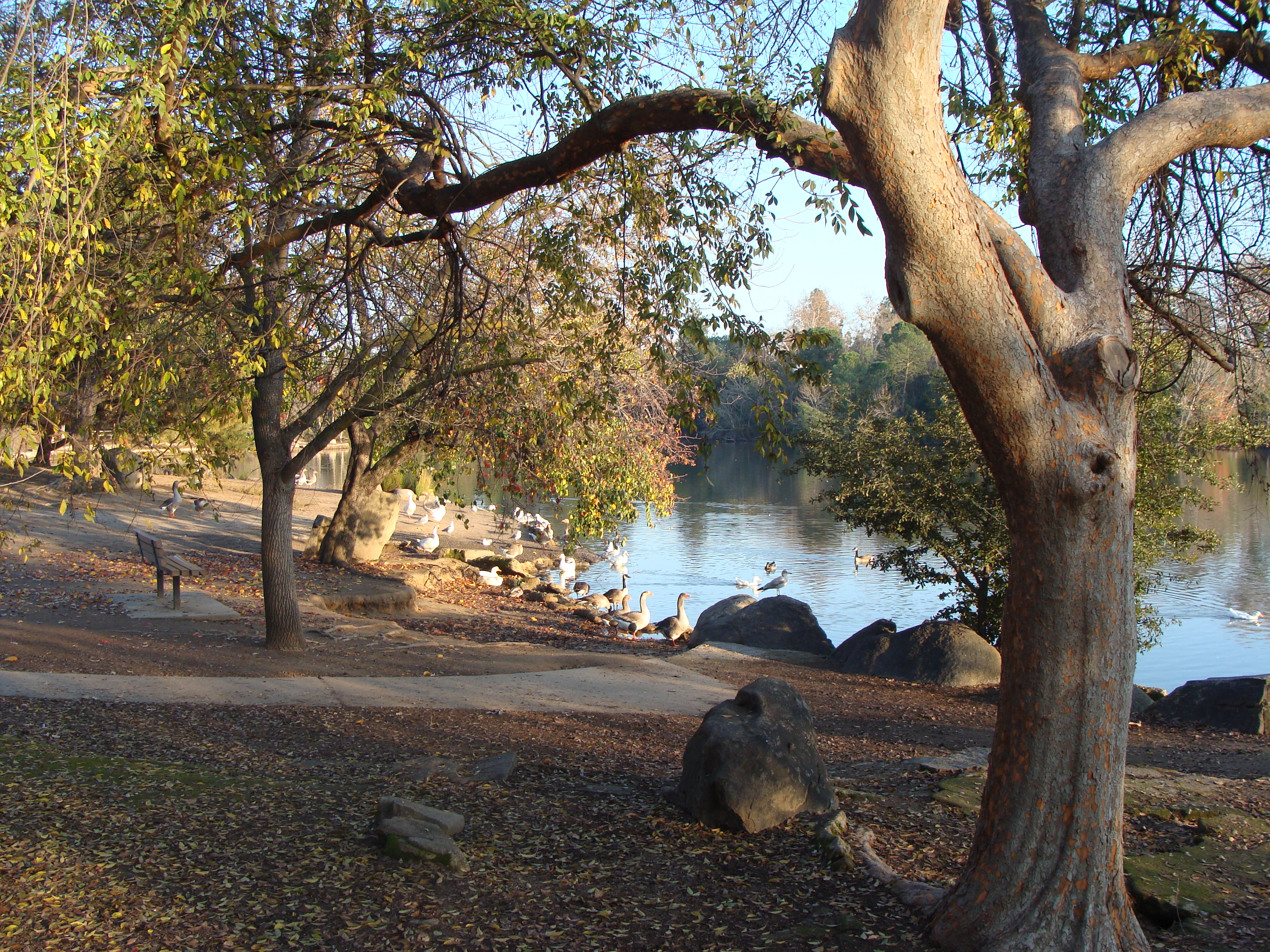
- Lakeside of Woodward Park
- Interactive map of Woodward Park
- Nearest city: Fresno, California, US
- Area: 300 acres (120 ha)
- Opened: 1968
- Operator: City of Fresno Parks Department

Woodward Park is a public park located in Fresno, California, abutting the San Joaquin River, opened in 1968. It is named after the late Ralph Woodward who bequeathed a portion of his estate to provide a regional park and bird sanctuary in Fresno. The park has a multi-use amphitheatre, an authentic Japanese Garden, disc golf course, BMX course, three children's playgrounds, a lake and trails that connect to the Lewis S. Eaton Trail.

== History ==
Ralph W. Woodward was a longtime businessman and property owner in the Fresno area. His father, Oscar James (O.J.) Woodward, was an early Fresno civic leader and banker who donated the large Memorial Fountain in Fresno's downtown Courthouse Park in 1921. Ralph Woodward created a will which included the requirement that, upon his death, one-fifth of his estate would go to the purchase of a site for a public park and bird refuge. The site was to be "selected solely by said trustees and conveyed to the City of Fresno as soon as purchased" and that the site shall be purchased "within a reasonable time." Woodward was an outdoorsman and frequently went trap shooting on the San Joaquin River. Woodward died on March 6, 1961, and his will was filed for probate. One of the executors and trustees of the estate estimated the value at $1 million.

Various options were considered for the site, but the estate trustees settled on land next to State Highway 41 and Shepherd Avenue with Friant Road skirting the eastern boundary in September 1964. The trustees purchased 185 acres (75 ha) of land for $296,000 and the city added 50 acres (20 ha) at a cost of $80,000 and the entire site was transferred to the city for the development of a park and bird refuge, now named Woodward Park.

== Features ==
=== Shinzen Friendship Garden ===
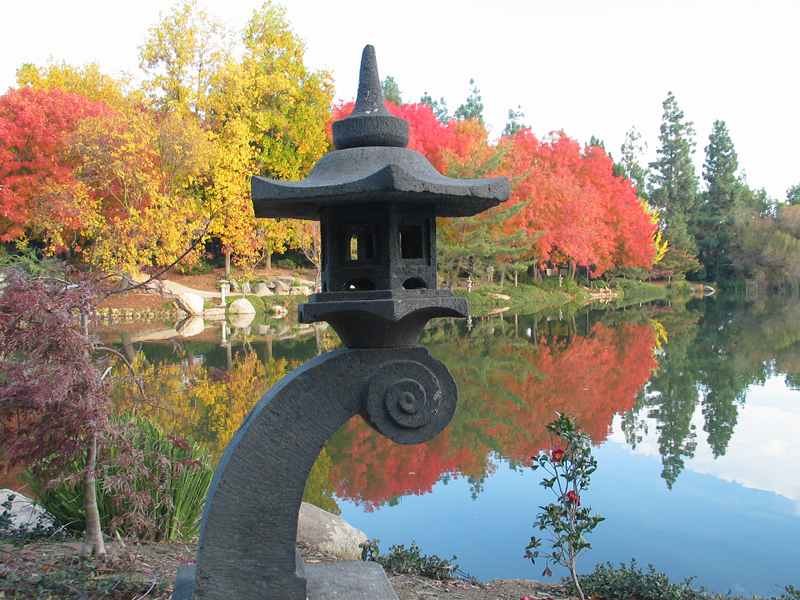
Shinzen Garden with Fall colors

As Woodward was being planted and constructed, a group of Japanese-Americans, headed by local accountant Ben Nakamura, approached the city to set aside two acres of the park for a Japanese garden. A meeting between the Japanese-American group, Fresno parks department director and the son of the late Ralph Woodward produced a plan for the project and they sought to raise $250,000 in donations for it. The city had formed a sister city relationship with Kochi, Japan a few years earlier, in 1965, and looked to them to donate authentic Japanese buildings.

Landscape architect Paul Saito was hired for design services in 1972 and construction began in 1975. Construction involved the addition of 30,000 cubic yards (23,000 m^{3}) of earth and 600 tonnes (1,300,000 lb) of granite boulders. On May 18, 1981, the garden was officially dedicated and a large delegation from Kochi attended the opening.

The Shinzen Friendship Garden, also known as the Shinzen Japanese Garden, is a 5-acre Japanese stroll garden. The Garden was planned around the four seasons, with distinctive plantings in each area. The spring section features Azaleas, Camellias, crabapples, irises, flowering cherries and plums. A paved pathway connects visitors to the summer section, in which a Koi Pond is the centerpiece. Tulip trees, Chinese pistache and tallow trees are planted in the Autumn Section, where they display bright colors in the fall. A large waterfall, pines and evergreens anchor the Winter Section.

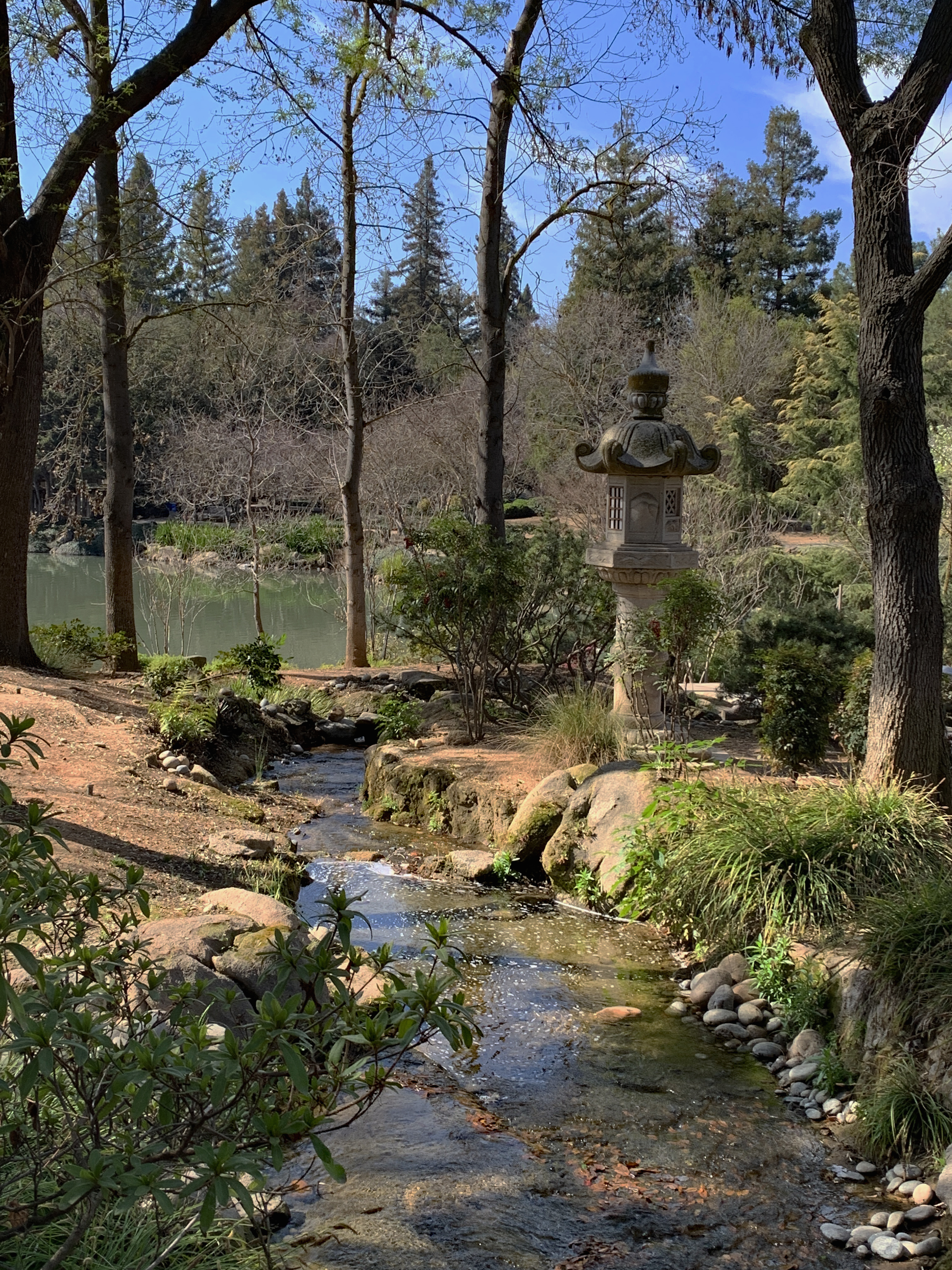
A stream running through the Fall Section of the Shinzen Garden

In 1989, the garden received a thatched-roofed teahouse that was built in Japan and re-assembled by Japanese carpenters on the shore of the pond. Allowing the construction of a Japanese-themed restaurant incorporated into the garden was much discussed. Proponents of the plan cited the revenue it would generate, allowing for continued improvements to the park while detractors claimed that a restaurant would violate the "quiet oasis" intent of original park benefactor Ralph Woodward. No restaurant was built and the area that it would occupy is a service yard seen from Friant Road.

The garden celebrated its 25th anniversary on April 29, 2006, with a delegation from Kochi, Japan present. A Cherry blossom tree was planted at the entry to commemorate this event. In 2015, the garden received over 100 bonsai specimens from the Golden State Bonsai Federation (GSBF) Collection of the former Clark Center for Japanese Art and Culture in Hanford, California.

The garden is a popular spot for photography sessions also hosts events. Annually, the garden is home to a Spring Blossom Festival, a Toro Nagashi (Floating Lantern) Ceremony in August and a Shinzen Cultural Faire.

=== Rotary Amphitheater ===
The park houses a shaded outdoor pavilion, named Rotary Amphitheater, which seats 4,000 people. The amphitheatre was renovated in 2010, and has hosted performances by acts such as Deftones, Tech N9ne, and Sevendust as well as numerous others.

=== BMX Track ===
BMX riders had used the park for recreation since the sport gained popularity. However, in 2007 the city constructed an official course in the Woodward's southwest corner. The 160,000 ft (49,000 m) S-shaped course includes timing equipment, barriers, hills, and a staging area.

=== Disc Golf Course ===
The first permanent disc golf course in Fresno was installed in Woodward Park, named "Woodward Legacy Disc Golf Course," and it opened in November 2003. The course includes eighteen holes on 57 acres (23 ha) acres of rolling hills, trees and bluffs. The hole distances range from 200 feet to more than 600 feet in length. Installation of the course was the work of city officials and parks department head at the time, Ron Primavera.

In the first year of operation, the course earned a spot as part of the "Central Valley Series," an annual circuit of approximately 10 tournaments throughout the Central Valley. Since 2014, the disc golf tournament in Fresno has branded itself the "Hard Pan Classic," named after the cementitious substratum frequently found in San Joaquin valley soil. In 2019, the Hard Pan Classic moved to the course in Kearney Park, just west of Fresno.

=== Connected open spaces and trails ===
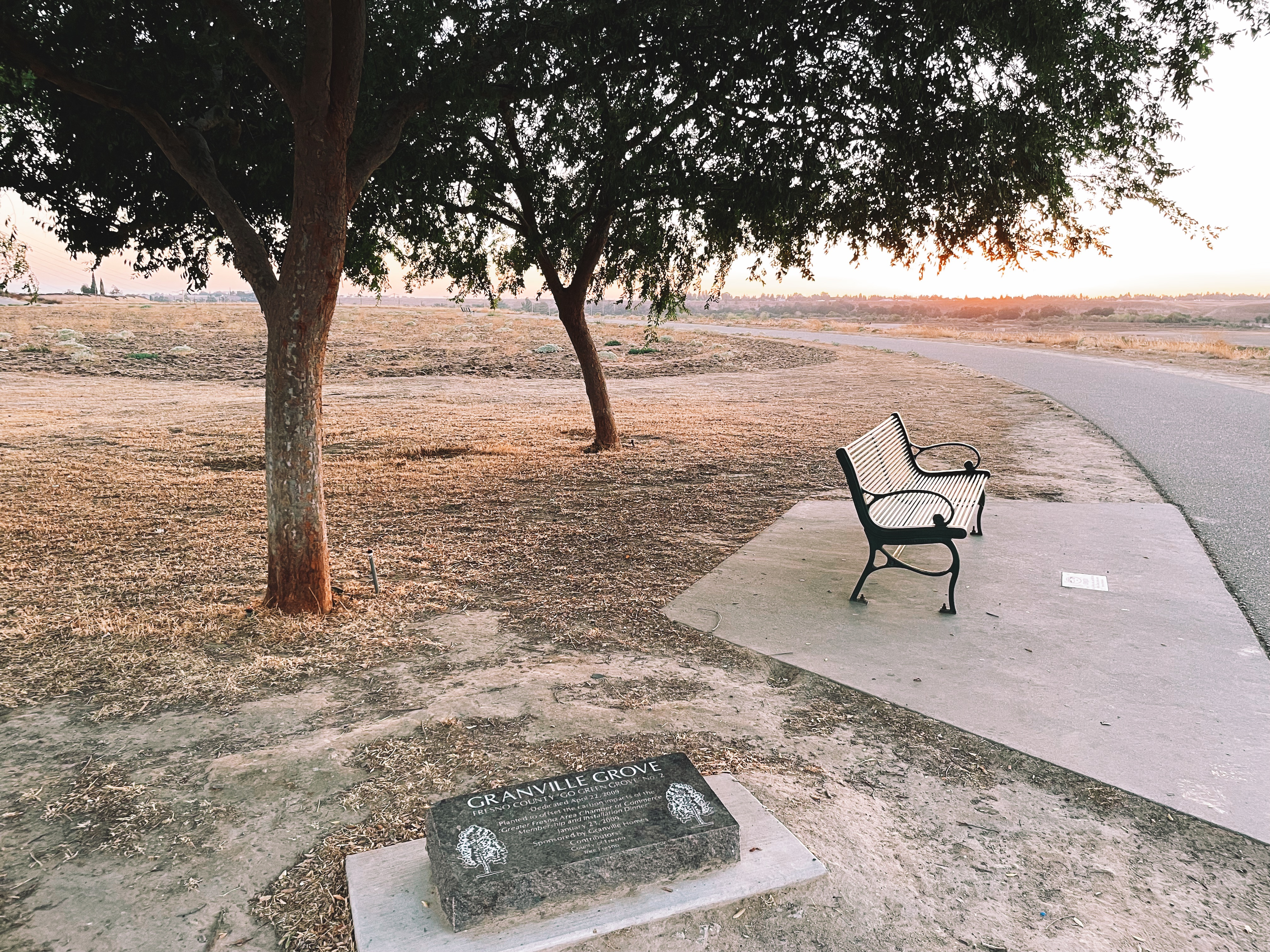
The connected Lewis S. Eaton trail

A 167-acre parcel just north of Woodward Park was acquired by the San Joaquin River Conservancy, named the Jensen River Ranch. The parks are now connected in multiple places. The six-mile, paved Lewis S. Eaton trail originates inside Woodward and continues north, following the curve of the San Joaquin river.

== Events ==
=== Cross Country ===
State championship Cross Country races for the top California high schoolers, organized by the CIF, have been held at Woodward since 1987. The state championship Cross Country races for community college students, organized by the CCCAA are also hosted there, typically in November.

At the university level, it is the home course for the Fresno State Bulldogs men's and women's cross country teams. It has also hosted 14 NCAA Regional Cross Country Championships since the tournament's inaugural year of 1968. The park most recently hosted the 2004 NCAA Western Region Championship, the 2006 Western Athletic Conference Championships and 2014 Mountain West Championships.

=== Shakespeare in the Park ===
Woodward Park also plays host to the Woodward Shakespeare Festival - for Shakespeare in the Park. The performances take place on the WSF Stage near the Friant/Fort Washington Entrance, and showcase a number of familiar titles. The company held 311 performances in the park over 11 seasons.

=== Grizzly Fest ===
Woodward Park hosted the Grizzly Fest music festival in 2018 and 2019. The event started in 2012, when local Fresno artist Fashawn organized a hip-hop festival held at the fairgrounds. The original lineup featured performances by himself, Murs, Husalah, Strong Arm Steady and many local talent and skateboarders. The event was revived in 2015 at Chukchansi Park, the minor league baseball stadium in downtown Fresno, and became an annual event after that. It moved to Woodward Park in 2018 because the move allowed expansion from one day to two days. There was much discussion about the potential effects of noise and parking congestion on nearby residents east of Woodward Park. The Grizzly Fest promoters appeared before the City Council in 2018 and responded to those concerns, getting their mitigation plan and $100,000 license to use Woodward Park approved.

In 2018, Snoop Dogg, Nas and Foster the People were the headliners and the event included two stages, a Ferris wheel, carnival games, vendor booths and food trucks. In 2019, the headliners were Portugal. The Man and G-Eazy. The festival was canceled in 2020 due to the COVID-19 pandemic and did not return in 2021 or 2022.

== Impact ==
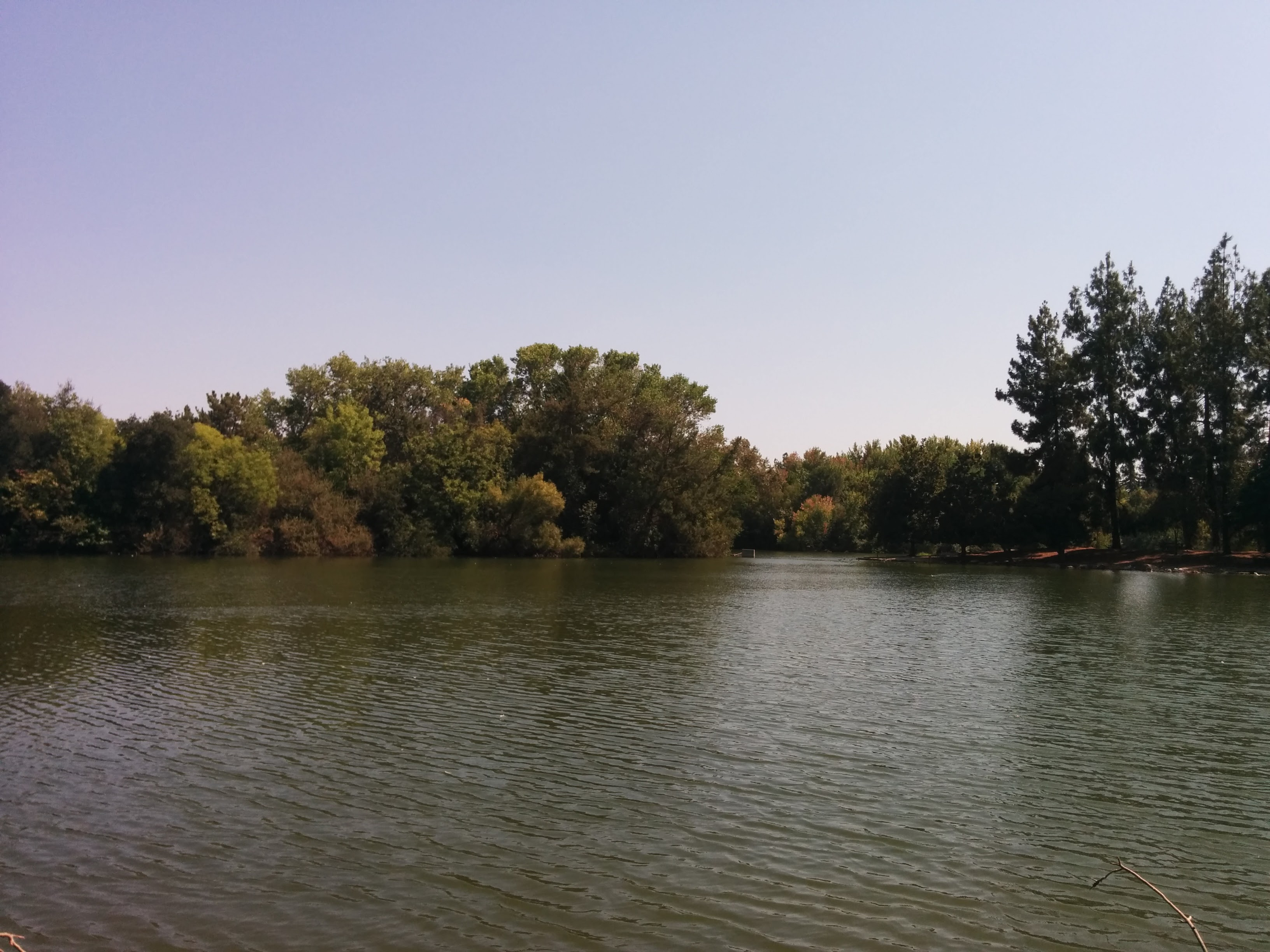
The lake in Woodward Park

The formation of Woodward Park preceded, and in some ways drove, development on Fresno's northeast edges. Ted C. Wills, who was mayor from 1969 to 1977 just following completion of Woodward Park, made northern expansion a focus of his administration. The community bounded on the south by Herndon Avenue, on the west by Blackstone Avenue, on the north by the San Joaquin River and Copper Avenue and on the east by Willow Avenue is called the Woodward Park area. Many structures in this area include the "Woodward" name, including the public library and the 1,100-home Woodward Lake subdivision. Woodward remains the largest public park in Fresno.
