= Community Regional Medical Center =

Hospital and trauma center in Fresno, California, U.S.

- Community Medical Centers
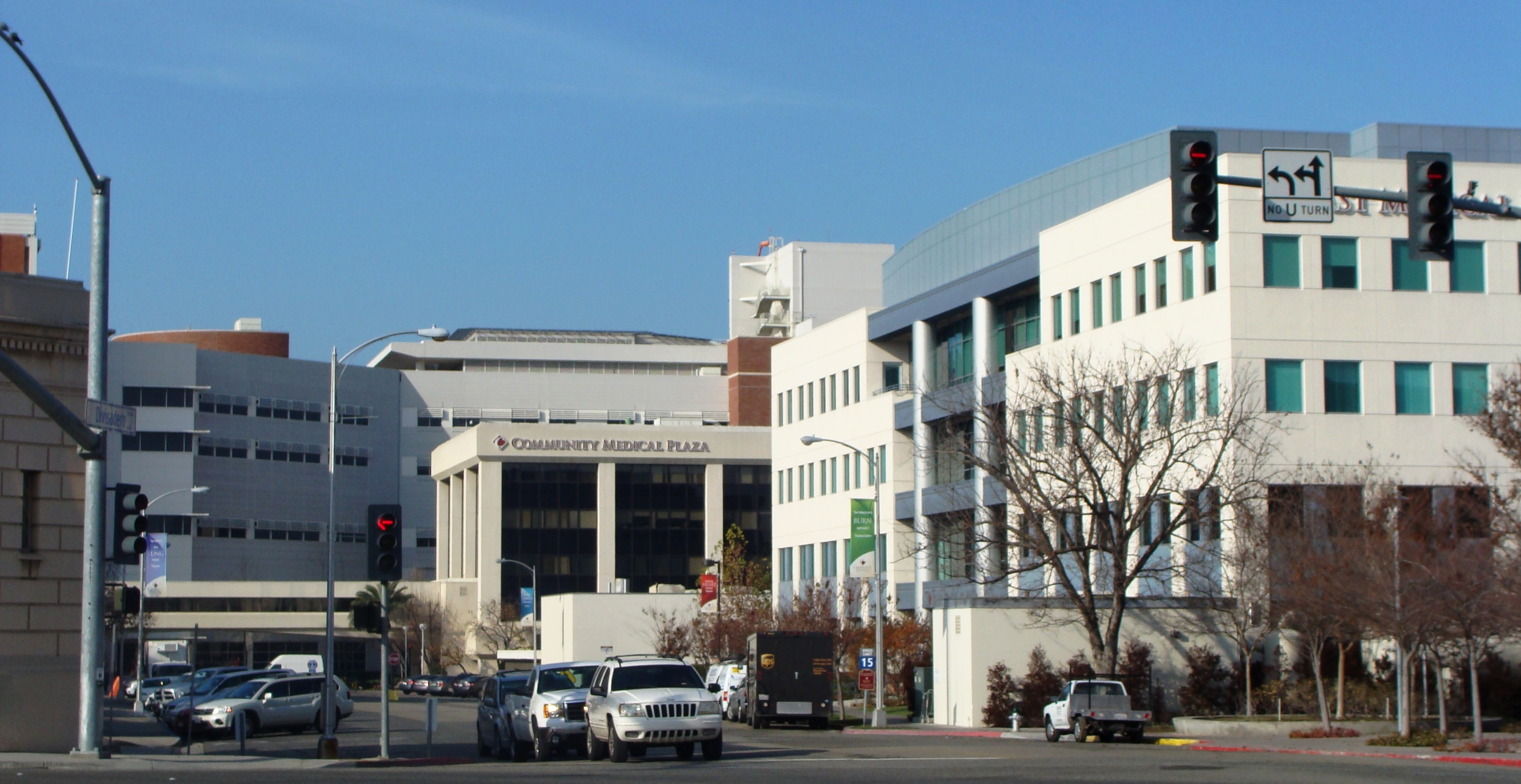

Geography
- Location: Fresno, California, United States
- Coordinates: 36°44′35″N 119°47′4″W

Organization
- Affiliated university: UCSF School of Medicine

Services
- Emergency department: Level I trauma center
- Beds: 685

History
- Founded: 1897

Links
- Website: communitymedical.org
- Lists: Hospitals in California

Community Regional Medical Center (CRMC) is a 685-bed regional hospital and trauma center in Fresno, California. It is a teaching hospital for the UCSF School of Medicine (UCSF Fresno), which provides graduate medical education and clinical training at the hospital.

CRMC is the flagship hospital of Community Medical Centers, a private nonprofit health system with four hospitals, long-term care facilities, and other health care facilities. Its history dates to the Burnett Sanitarium, established in 1897 and sold to the nonprofit Fresno Community Hospital in 1945. Operations of the Fresno County General Hospital were transferred to the Community system in 1996, and by 2007, the remaining functions of the former general hospital were transferred to CRMC.

Community Regional Medical Center is a Level I trauma center.

In 2020, its neurosurgical trauma services were reinstated after a brief suspension.

== See also ==
- University of California, San Francisco
