= Fresno County Courthouse =

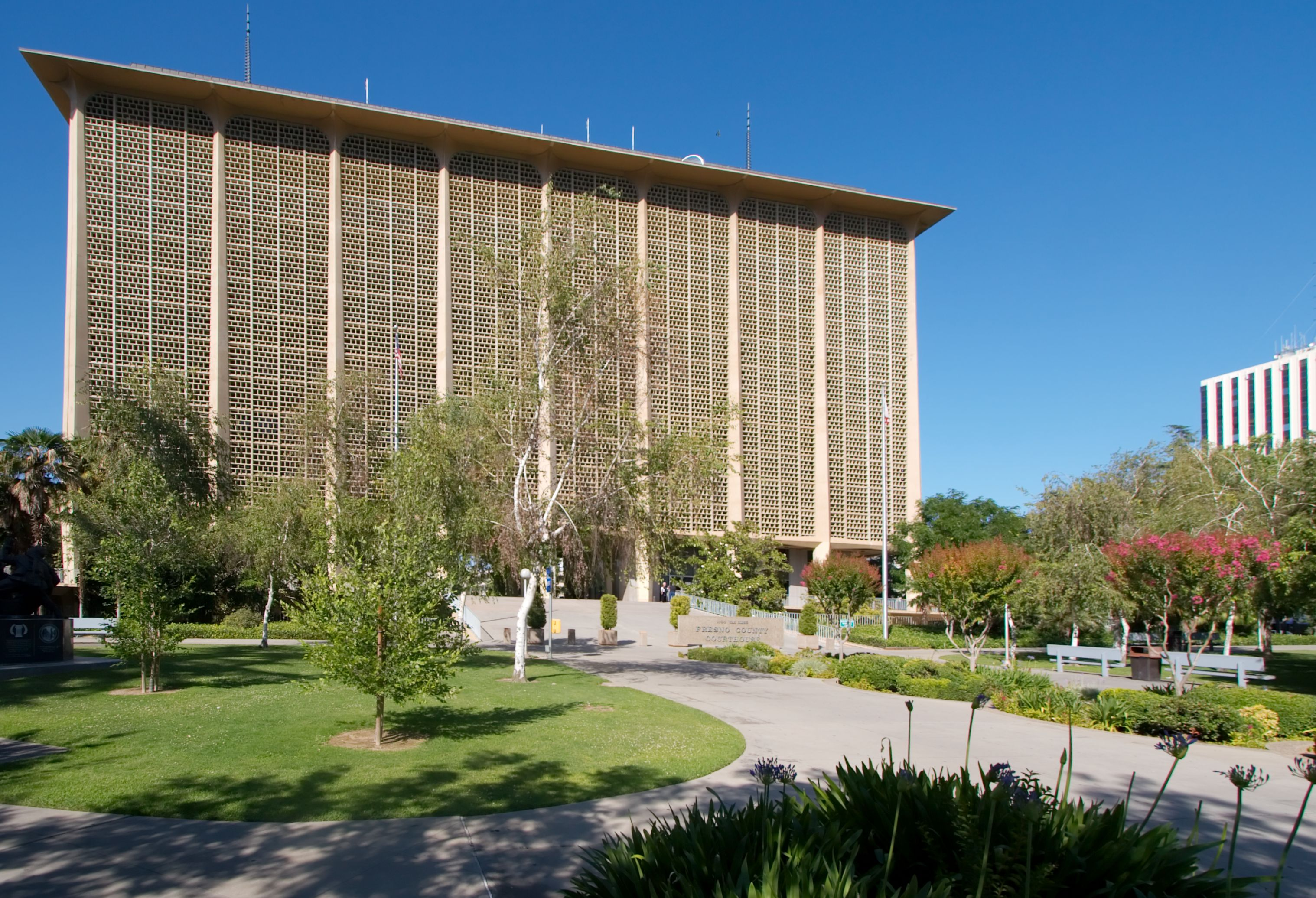
- Interactive map of the Fresno County Courthouse area
- Alternative names: Fresno Main Courthouse

General information
- Type: Courthouse
- Architectural style: New Formalism
- Location: 1100 Van Ness Avenue; Fresno, California
- Coordinates: 36.7364°N 119.7891°W
- Completed: 1966
- Owner: County of Fresno
- Management: County of Fresno

Height
- Roof: 200 ft (61 m)

Technical details
- Floor count: 8; 2 below ground
- Lifts/elevators: 5

Design and construction
- Architects: WALTER WAGNER & PARTNERS, who were Paul Harris, Project Architect, James Blayney, Paul Schoenwald, Will Thomas, and Harry Bode

The Fresno County Courthouse is an 8-story, 200-foot-tall (61 m) high-rise building at 1100 Van Ness Avenue in downtown Fresno, California that serves as the main location for the Fresno County Superior Court.

Construction was completed on the building in 1966 on the site of, and replacing, the previous neo-classical style courthouse that was built in 1875. Architectural historian David Gebhardt said of the loss of the old courthouse to the current one, "insipid."

The courthouse is connected to the Fresno County Jail underground through a system of tunnels providing easy and safe transportation of inmates.

A $113 million seismic retrofit was scheduled to be completed in 2015.

The V-LINE bus stops here, providing connections to Visalia six times daily

== Gallery ==
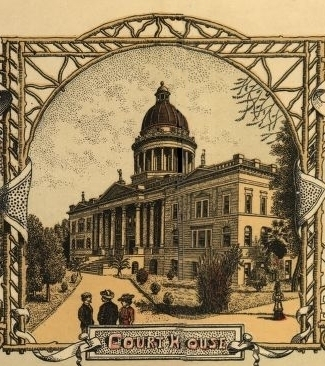
An early drawing of the old 1885 Fresno County Courthouse

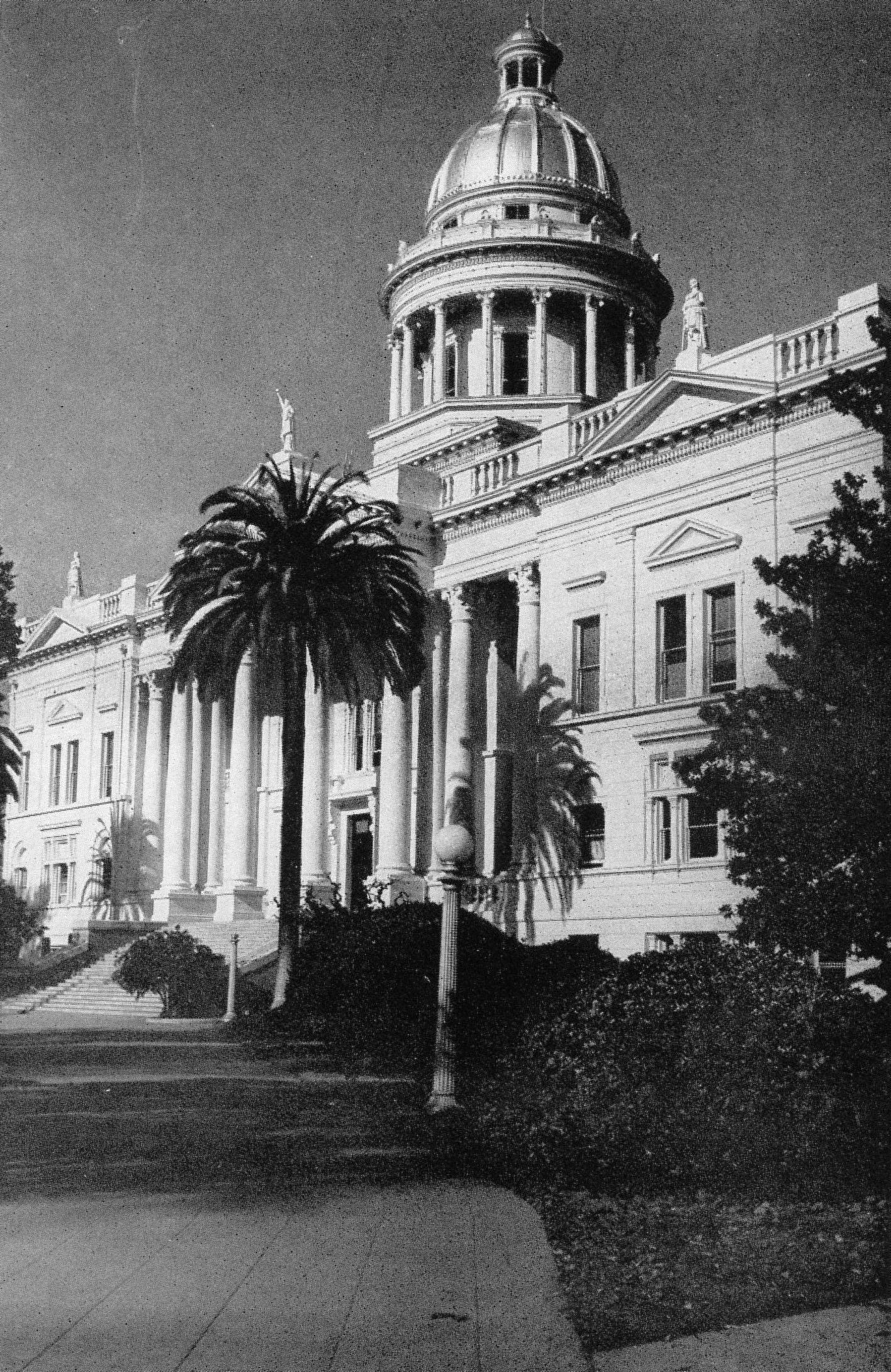
The Old Fresno Courthouse from 1956
