= Allensworth =

Allensworth may refer to:

== People ==
- Lt. Colonel Allen Allensworth (1842 – 1914), United States Army officer
- Jermaine Allensworth, American basketball player
- Josephine Leavell Allensworth (1855-1938), American musician, teacher, & activist

== Places ==
- Allensworth, California, town founded by Col. Allensworth
- Colonel Allensworth State Historic Park, California State Historic Park
