= Delilah Beasley =

American historian (1867–1934)

Delilah L. Beasley
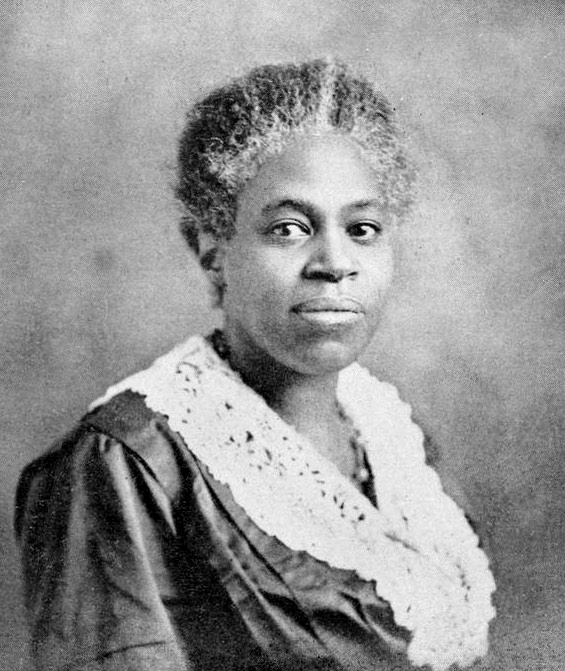
- Delilah L. Beasley, from a 1919 publication
- Born: September 9, 1867; Cincinnati, Ohio, U.S.
- Died: August 18, 1934 (aged 66); San Leandro, California, U.S.
- Occupations: Historian, columnist

Delilah Leontium Beasley (September 9, 1867 – August 18, 1934), was an American historian and newspaper columnist for the Oakland Tribune in Oakland, California. Beasley was the first African American woman to be published regularly in a major metropolitan newspaper. Beasley was also first to present written proof of the existence of California's Black pioneers in Slavery in California (1918) and The Negro Trail-Blazers of California (1919). Her career in journalism spanned more than 50 years. She detailed the racism in California and the heroic achievements by Black people to overcome them during the late 19th century and early 20th century.

== Biography ==
Beasley was born in Cincinnati, Ohio, the oldest of five children in the family of Daniel Beasley, an engineer, and Margaret Harris, a homemaker. After her parents' death, while she was still a teenager, Beasley had to find a full-time job to support herself, and she pursued a career as a trained masseuse.

In 1883, Beasley began writing for a Black newspaper, the Cleveland Gazette, which was founded by Harry C. Smith. She wrote briefly about church and social activities. Three years later, she published her first column in the Sunday The Cincinnati Enquirer under the headline "Mosaics". Beasley studied journalism under Daniel Rudd, a well-known newspaper publisher of the Colored Catholic Tribune in Cincinnati. Beasley, like Rudd, was a devout Catholic.

In 1910, at age 39, Beasley moved to Oakland, California, attending lectures and researching at University of California, Berkeley and writing essays for presentations at local churches. In 1910 the African American population in Oakland was 3,055. The small Black population supported a flowering of indigenous institutions and community formation in the 1910s and 1920s. Among these institutions were various black-owned small businesses, churches, and private social-welfare organizations. In addition, several Black newspapers were published in Oakland, including the Oakland Sunshine, which began publication in 1902, publisher William Prince, and the Western Outlook, established in 1894, publishers J. S. Francis and J. L. Derrick. In 1915, she wrote for a black audience in the Oakland Sunshine.

=== Trail-Blazers book ===
Delilah Beasley chronicled African American "firsts" and notable achievements in early California in her book The Negro Trail-Blazers of California (1919), which is a compilation of records from the California Archives in the Bancroft Library at the University of California, Berkeley, found in newspapers from 1848 to the 1890s, and most particularly all the Black newspapers from the first in 1855 through 1919. Beasley's Trail-Blazers book included diaries, biographical sketches, poetry, photographs, old papers, conversations with old pioneers, and a comprehensive history of early legislation and court cases. Beasley's informative compilation of records is full of success stories. It gives many hundreds of names of Black figures in California from the pioneer period to the late 19th century.

Beasley writes about the Black gold miners of the late 1840s:

"A history of the Negro people of California would be incomplete without mention of the mining men who came in 1849. There were at one time several hundred Negro miners working claims on Mormon and Mokelumn Hill, at Placerville, Grass Valley and elsewhere in California mountains. One such man was Moses Rodgers a mining expert and was considered one of the best mining engineers in the state. He was also a metallurgist and owned a group of mines at Hornitus. The colored miners rarely took a chance in buying mining stock. He had more sacred duties to perform with his money. He either used it to pay for the freedom or liberty of himself, his family or other loved ones in faraway "Dixie-Land". If not that, then he contributed largely from his diggings to assisting the "Executive Committee of the Colored Convention" in their struggles to secure legislative enactments in the interest of the Negro race in California".

Beasley spent nine years writing her book, which is important to historians of California and the West, and of African American western history. She knew many people who had been in California from the beginning of statehood and before. So much of what we know of California Black pioneers grows out of her book. One of her possible heroes in the book was Lt. Col. Allen Allensworth, in 1908 founder of an all African American town in Allensworth, California, now a state park, Colonel Allensworth State Historic Park. Beasley wrote, "The late Colonel Allensworth was born a slave, and yet there are few, if any, who have made more out of life and done more for their fellow man".

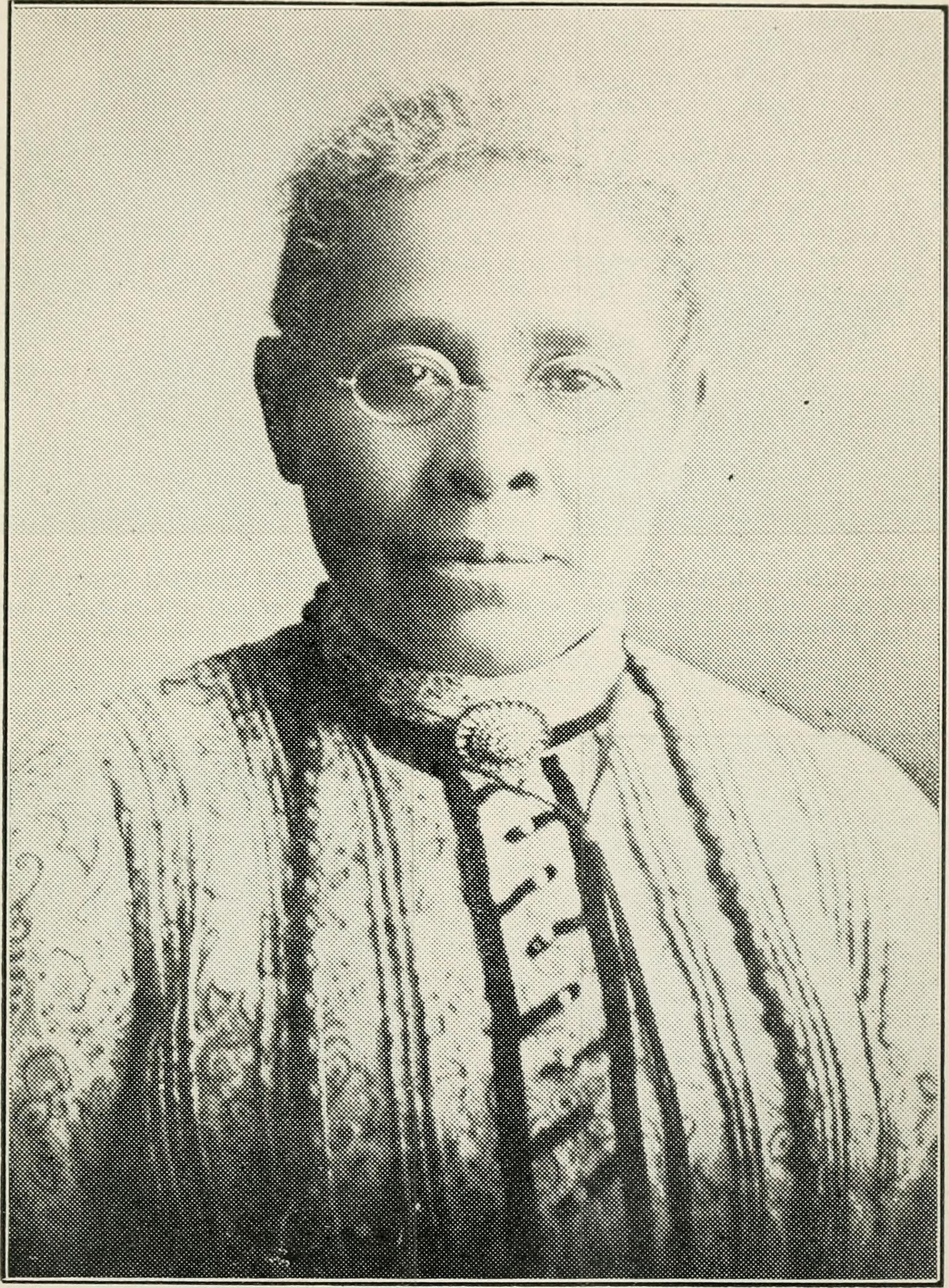
Photograph of Ellen Huddleston, a daughter of Biddy Mason, from The Negro Trailblazers of California.

Delilah Beasley placed women prominently in her book. Over the next four decades, no other major works followed Beasley's volume. One might expect a plethora of articles and books concerning various aspects of Black women's history during and immediately following the civil rights movements of the 1910s. Yet western Black women received little attention.

=== Newspaper columnist ===
Her work on the book The Negro Trail-Blazers paved the way for Beasley to become the first Black woman in California to write regularly for a major metropolitan newspaper. By 1925 Delilah was writing regularly for the Oakland Tribune, whose Sunday column Activities Among Negroes was authored by Beasley. She often spent far over forty hours a week collecting material for her column. She wrote about churches, social events, women's clubs, literary societies, and local as well as national politics. Beasley's motivation was to give the white readers of the Oakland Tribune a positive picture of the Black community by documenting the achievements of successful Black men and women, both in Oakland and elsewhere. By highlighting such items, she served the larger goal of demonstrating the capabilities of African Americans while building a strong constituency for her column and a network of sources from whom she could count on receiving information. In performing this service she laid an important part of the groundwork for the expanded inter-racial cooperation that developed during the Great Depression era of the 1930s. Richard Dillon, whose book on California Pioneers highlighted special qualities of their unusual and stimulating lives, wrote that Beasley was "born 50 years before her time". Beasley wrote for the Oakland Tribune from 1925–1934.

=== Community service and social activist ===
Beasley, who never married, belonged to many civic organizations, including The Delilah L. Beasley Literary and Improvement Club, National Association for the Advancement of Colored People (NAACP), northern California branch founded in 1915, headquarters in Oakland. She was a member of the Alameda County League of Women Voters, the Public Welfare League of Alameda County, and the League of Nations Association of the California Federated Women's Club, which hosted the biennial convention in the Oakland Auditorium, attracting delegates from across the country. In 1920, Oakland's black club women, including Delilah Beasley and others, organized the Linden Center Young Women's Christian Association (YWCA) to combat the cold reception extended to them by the all-white branches in the city. The Linden Center YWCA provided an array of services, including "religious and vocational training, adult education, counseling services, and a full calendar of recreational and cultural programs". In the mid-1920s, Beasley was a national historian of the National Association of Colored Women (NACW), and the Alameda County League of Colored Women Voters, and devoted press coverage to both in her column, Activities Among Negroes, which ran in the white daily, the Oakland Tribune.

Oakland Tribune, February 12, 1933

In 1929, Beasley also used her professional skills and prominence in international groups to rebut white fears about the consequences of creating an International House at the University of California, Berkeley. Many Berkeley landlords protested the construction of the House, fearing an influx of foreigners. International House at UC Berkeley is a multi-cultural residence and program center serving students, the local community and alumni worldwide. Its mission is to foster intercultural respect, understanding, lifelong friendships and leadership skills for the promotion of a more tolerant and peaceful world. The university wrote: "More than 800 people gathered in Berkeley to protest racial integration in the proposed International House. At that meeting, Delilah Beasley, a black reporter for the Oakland Tribune, passionately defended the concept to a disgruntled and stunned audience. And it was Beasley who stood up to the protests of property owners who feared that I-House would cause Berkeley to be overrun with Blacks and Asians". Notable I-House alumni and residents are, Delbert E. Wong, Jerry Brown, Oona King, Chitra Banerjee Divakaruni, Rose Bird, F. Drew Gaffney, Eric E. Schmidt, and Sadako Ogata.

The weekly column Beasley wrote for the newspaper, Activities Among Negroes, enhanced her standing in the community because of her ability to generate favorable publicity for black political struggles. Recognition of her ability to influence the white community strengthened her status within both white and Black communities. She confronted misconceptions and contradictions as a newspaper journalist, and campaign against the use in the press of explicitly derogatory words when writing about African Americans. In 1932, Beasley organized the donation of a painting by a Black artist to the Oakland Museum. Due to her efforts as president of the “Far Western Inter-Racial Committee,” a painting by Eugene Burk, titled "The Slave Mother" was unveiled and presented to gallery director William Clapp, with Beasley expressing hope that "the presentation of this picture to the permanent collection of the Oakland Municipal Art may be the means of opening many doors to young aspiring Negroes, not only of Oakland but of the United States." Clapp responded,

"We feel a very great appreciation of the thought and effort. Even under normal conditions the gift would be remarkable, since it is the first presented in this gallery as a formal expression of racial culture. It is also noteworthy because it is the first work of art that has been presented to the gallery by an organized group of citizens".

In 1933, it was at Beasley's urging that California State Assemblyman William F. Knowland, then assistant publisher of the Oakland Tribune, and Assemblyman Frederick M. Roberts of Los Angeles County, introduced an anti-lynching bill, that passed unanimously in both branches of the California Legislature. It was the state's first mob violence law. The majority of lynchings in California between 1850 and 1935 were perpetrated against Latinos, Native Americans, and Asian Americans.

== Death ==
Delilah Leontium Beasley died on August 18, 1934, at Fairmont Hospital in San Leandro, California. According to her death certificate, the cause of death was arterio-sclerotic heart disease with hypertension. Her home at that time was listed as being in Oakland, California. She was laid to rest at Saint Mary Cemetery in Oakland. Twenty years later, a monument was erected, and a perpetual care endowed. Carved on the old tombstone is a simple epitaph: "Author and columnist, a native of Ohio and for 25 years a resident of Oakland."

== Legacy ==
Veteran and student journalists are honored with the Hall of Fame & Scholarship Awards of the Cincinnati chapter of the National Association of Black Journalists, with the "Delilah Leontium Beasley Scholar" awards.

== Works by Beasley ==
- Beasley, Delilah L. "Slavery in California", Journal of Negro History, vol. 3, (January 1919) (includes California Freedom Papers (1851–1856)
- ___________. The Negro Trail-Blazers of California (1919), reprinted 1969, 1997 & 2004 – ISBN 978-1-885852-40-3
- ___________. Proceedings of the Fifteenth Biennial Convention, National Association of Colored Women: Held in Municipal Auditorium, Oakland, California, July 29 to August 6, 1926

== Resources ==
- Brown, Hallie Q. Homespun Heroines and Other Women of Distinction (1925), Oxford University Press, reprinted (1988), Oxford University Press. – ISBN 0-19-505237-4
- Crouchett, Lorraine Jacobs. Delilah Leontium Beasley: Oakland's Crusading Journalist, El Cerrito, California, Downey Place Publishing House, (1990) – ISBN 0-910823-03-0
- Hine, Darlene, et al. Black Women in America: An Historical Encyclopedia, Carlson Publishing Inc., (1994) – ISBN 0-926019-61-9
- Roses, Lorraine E. Harlem's Glory: Black Women Writing, 1900–1950, Harvard University Press (1997) – ISBN 0-674-37270-0
- Streitmatter, Roger. Delilah, Beasley: A Black Woman Journalist Who Lifted As She Climbed, American Journalism Historians Association, October 1991, Philadelphia
- Wheeler, B. Gordon. Black California: The History of African-Americans in the Golden State, Hippocrene Books, New York, (1993) – ISBN 0-7818-0074-9
