= Hopkins Library =

Coordinates: 44°55′32″N 93°24′51″W

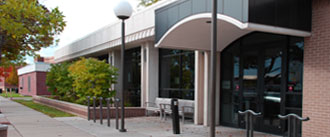
- Interactive map of the Hopkins Library area

General information
- Location: 22 11th Avenue North, Hopkins, Minnesota
- Opened: 1968
- Renovated: 2002

Library service to the Hopkins, Minnesota, community was established more than 100 years ago, when the library was housed in City Hall. The library moved to the historic Dow House in 1948 and then temporarily to a vacant restaurant in 1963. The library opened in its current location in 1968 and was renovated in 2002. The library joined Hennepin County Library in 1973.

== The beginnings ==
In 1910, the population of the Village of West Minneapolis, as Hopkins was first called, was 3,022. But the settlement was bustling: The Minneapolis Threshing Machine Company, which moved to the village in 1887, was manufacturing harvest equipment for farmers throughout the western prairie; the raspberry farms were thriving—and bars, churches, banks and other businesses were sprouting up everywhere. But something was missing from the village: There wasn't a library. In 1912, The Women's Improvement League, led by Mrs. W. B. Anderson, convinced city officials that space for a library should be set aside in the newly built city hall building on 8th and Excelsior Avenue (now Main Street). Three rooms were reserved, and soon the league and Hopkins high alumni stocked books, organized shelves and began children's story hours. The first librarian of this volunteer-based library was Lillian Wheeler. By 1915, the village had budgeted $700 a year to fund this young library, and there were some 800 books on the shelves. About 458 were checked out each month and, in just three years, 1,050 library cards were issued.

Children's story hours were put on by the League with up to 175 children attending. Along with donated and purchased English-language books, a collection of 1,200 Czech-language books were donated by the Western Bohemian Fraternal Association of Glen Lake. This was very helpful for the large population of Czechoslovaks that immigrated to Hopkins to work for the threshing machine company, in the raspberry fields and for businesses opening in the village. The Czech-language books were a source of pride for the immigrants, as well as a reminder of their Bohemian heritage.

== The Merger Controversy, Part 1 ==
In 1931, a lively debate was sparked in Hopkins over whether the city library should merge with the Hennepin County Library System. The county system was formed just after the Hopkins Library opened, and it was the only suburban library that still was independent.

According to The Hennepin County Review circa 1931, the Hopkins Village Council spent many hours hearing debate on the issue. The meetings were long and heavily attended; the citizenry was very invested in the outcome.

Those opposed objected to higher taxes as well as the loss of control: they wanted the autonomy to stock the titles they wanted, notably the Czech books. Those in favor supported the merger for expanded access to reference books for local schools, which were provided by the county—as well as for greater resources for local students. The Library board voted in mid-March to approve the merger by a vote of 8–1. Mayor Hagen commissioned the village council to study the measure—and ultimately, the village council rejected it on a 3–2 vote. At the next meeting, Miss Lindborg, principal at the Harley Hopkins School, expressed great regret at losing the service of the county system. Its loss, she pointed out, would greatly limit reference reading, because without the support of county funding the city simply couldn't stock as many volumes.

Finally, on April 28, the village council opted to let the public decide the matter—and set a special election for May 23, 1931. The two sides squared off respectively in The Hennepin County Review and The Minneapolis Journal—and the factions were equally passionate in their viewpoints. But perhaps the most compelling arguments came from The Hopkins Taxpayers League, formed specifically to oppose the merger. The league argued in The Hennepin County Review that increased county taxes would be burdensome and strongly objected to “outside” entities controlling town-owned assets. They even went so far as to point out that Hennepin County, at that time, had no board—and therefore would have no governance. The argument turned personal when the league questioned Mayor Hagen's loyalty to the village, pointing out that previous mayors had "deemed it disloyal to consider giving away the Hopkins Library."

But supporters of the merger countered with a full-page Journal article pointing out that the amount paid to the county would actually be $150 less than what was budgeted by the village. They also pointed out that the collection would remain in Hopkins—but that the public would now have access, as well, to an additional half-million books through an inter-library loan from the Hennepin County and Minneapolis systems. Finally, they assured readers that the current collection of books in Czech would remain at the library. On May 23, the special election was held. Turnout was heavy; emotions ran high—and when the polling place opened its doors, a line of voters stretched down the block. When all was said and done, the measure was defeated 501–411 and Hopkins kept its independent status—which the city would continue to do for more than 40 years.

Soon after the election, a name many local residents still recognize became an indelible part of Hopkins history. In 1932, Bloomie Mountain was hired as head librarian of the Hopkins Library. By all accounts a tough, no-nonsense person intolerant of mischief in her library, Miss Mountain was nonetheless a legend: beloved by children and adults alike. A staunch advocate of keeping the library for Hopkins people only, she made sure non-residents paid a fee for a library card. Meticulous with details, she made questionable cardholders prove their homes were in Hopkins—by insisting they show her where they lived on the road map she had hanging behind the reference desk at the Dow House.

Bloomie coordinated the move to the Dow House in 1948, and put her own stamp on the new library. She was complimented for her homey and creative touches throughout the building; she converted the mansion's butler's pantry—which included a dumbwaiter and sink—into her office. During Bloomie's tenure, a new children's and young adult section was opened, and library patrons fondly recall bringing their children to check out new books and picnic on the grounds at Dow House Park.

Bloomie loved the library and was responsible for many improvements during her 29-year tenure. She bought more than 28,000 books: when she retired in 1963, there were more than 10,000 non-fiction volumes in Hopkins’s collection; when she began her career in 1932, there were only 3,600 books total. She also organized the books into a more coherent cataloguing system. In an article about her retirement, she said, "When I took the job there was no filing system or catalogue – just shelves of books. I spent a year organizing the first file ... and I almost gave up three different times." But despite her love of the library, Bloomie Mountain had looked forward to renewing friendships and traveling to Rome after retirement but, unfortunately, it was not to be. She died soon after she quit working, in June 1963, at 73. Her portrait hung in the library for decades and is now at the Hopkins Historical Society. For 31 years, Bloomie defined the library—and she embodied the spunk and pioneer spirit still prevalent in Hopkins today.

== The Dow House ==
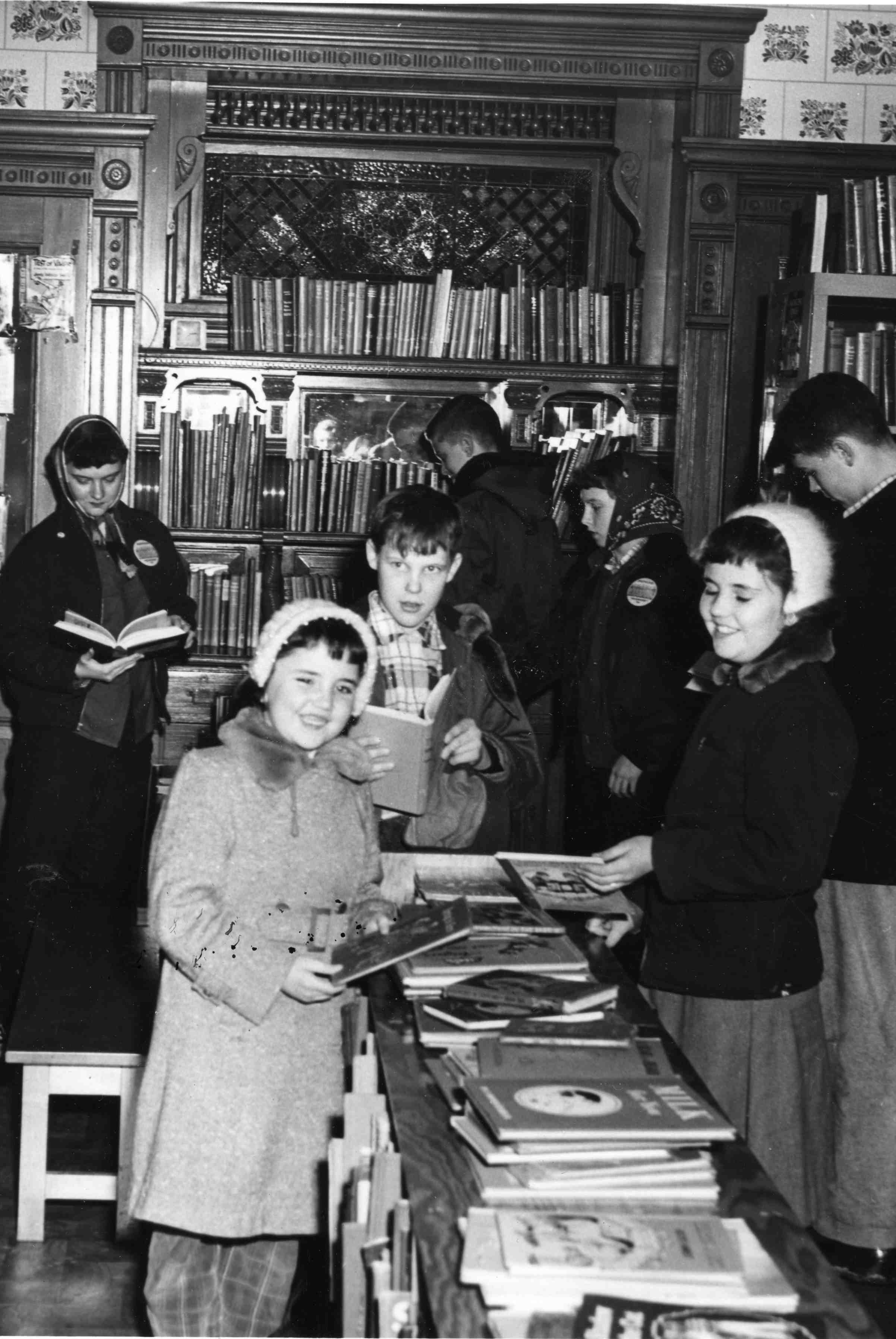
While Hopkins Library was located at the Dow House it was popular with children.

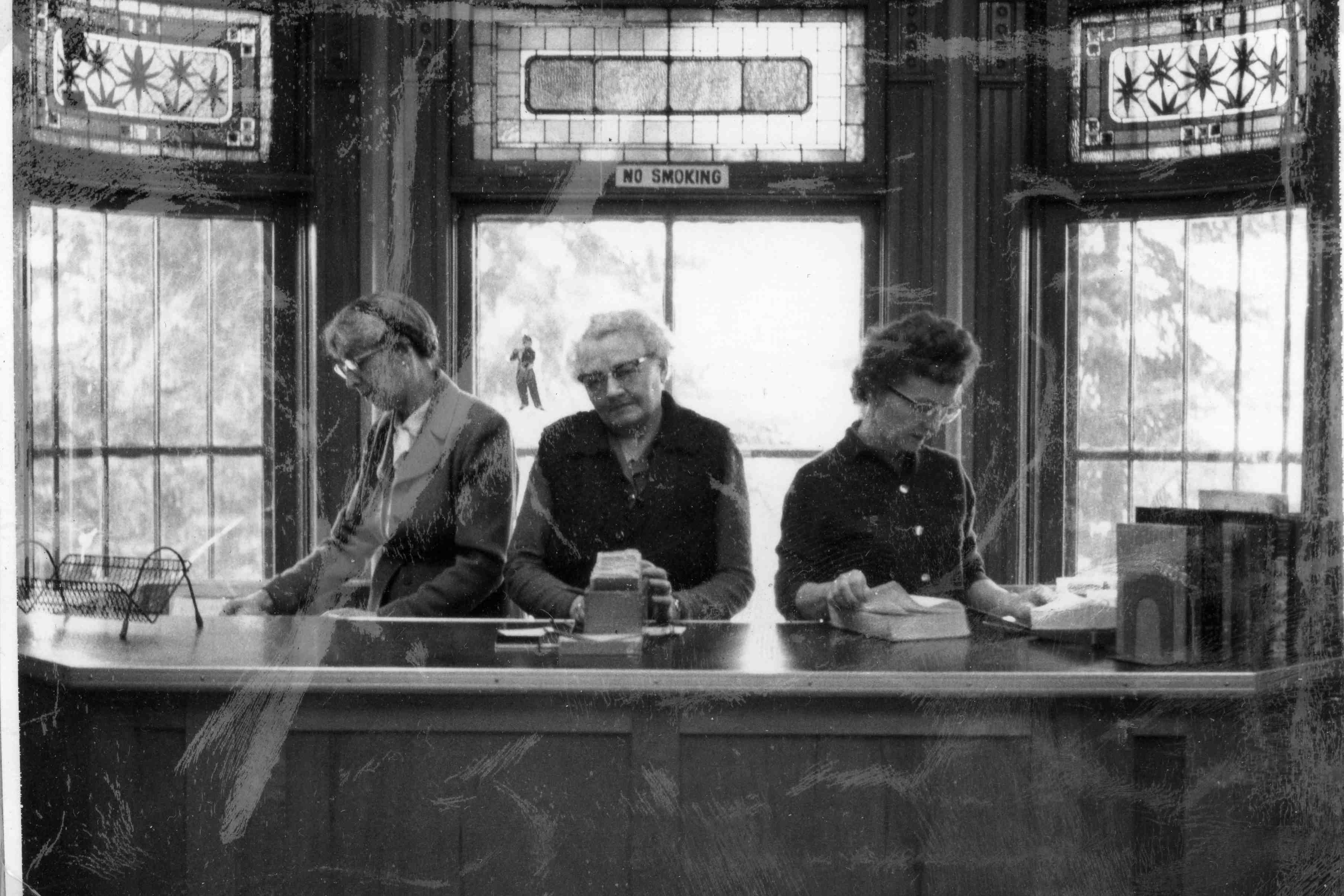
Hopkins Library staff working at the customer service desk at the Dow House.

In the late 1940s, it became clear that the three rooms in the back of the city hall were no longer adequate to house the expanding collection. Hopkins had grown and the village officially became a city in 1947. The city council considered letting the library use the meeting hall in the same building, but then an opportunity arose that solved two problems.

The Dow House was built in 1894 by Daniel and Belinda Dow. After marrying in 1855, they owned 160 acres and ran a prosperous farm. Portions of their land were ultimately sold both to the railroad and The Minneapolis Threshing Machine Company for a tidy profit—and they used the proceeds to build a beautiful 15-room mansion (land now occupied by the post office) at 9th and First Street South. The Dow family lived in the house until the 1930s when Llewellyn Dow, son of Daniel and Belinda, sold the house to the city for $4,300 in 1935. The house was used for various purposes after that, including rental offices for The Minneapolis Threshing Machine Company (now Minneapolis Moline).

At the same time that the library was looking for new space, the Moline Company was in negotiations to purchase the Dow House from the City of Hopkins. Articles in The Hennepin County Review between September and October 1947 reported a lack of communication between the council and Moline officials. At the Sept. 2 meeting, the Moline sent a letter asking if the city would like to sell the building, and if so, for how much? An appraisal had been done earlier that valued the house at $19,000. But during the course of the meeting, a motion was passed to order the Moline to vacate the Dow House by November 1. Why this motion passed is not entirely clear. The Minneapolis Moline Company had rented the first floor from the city for three years, and had expressed interest in purchasing a year earlier. No mention was made about the Moline being bad tenants. There could have been concern if the company bought the house it would be torn down to build a new office building. What seems clear was that communication between the city and the company was strained, and both sides grew weary of the protracted negotiation process. So when the library needed new space, the Dow House seemed to be the perfect fit.

At an October 7 meeting, members of the library board, headed by Joseph Vesely, said the move was mandatory because the library was bursting at the seams; there were so many books mashed on the crowded shelves there was no room to read. He pointed out that in 1947, an amazing 1,917 people visited the library and 19,000 books were loaned in the cramped quarters; the only solution, he argued, was to move to the more spacious Dow House. At this same meeting, M. B. Hagen, representing The Civic and Commerce Association, pointed out that selling the house to Minneapolis Moline would make good business sense. Moline, he said, was in desperate need of office space, and moreover the risk of losing a cornerstone of the city was not worth taking. Hagen also argued that the Dow House was not an adequate facility for the library.

When it came time to vote, the council sided with Vesely and moved the library to the Dow House; the city asked the Moline to vacate the premises by Jan. 1, 1948. But the debate had not yet cooled. At the next meeting, on Oct. 21, an official offer came in from Minneapolis Moline to purchase the house for $15,000. However, this offer was rejected—and the library officially moved into their new home in early 1948. Many people living today remember the Dow House, home of the Hopkins Library for 15 years, as the charming library of their youth and young adulthood. They have colorful memories of walking from room to room to find the book they sought, of two large fireplaces on each side of the south parlor, of the large staircase that spiraled up to the children's section. Circulation, Reference, Fiction and Non-Fiction were all on the first floor; in the dining room the shelves were so tall and over-burdened with books that the public wasn't allowed into the section: If you wanted a non-fiction book, you had to fill out a slip and the librarian would get the item for you. In the warmer months, people would bring their families, picnic on the grounds and read books from the library.

== The New Building and Merger Part 2 ==
In the 1960s, the movement for accessibility made the Dow House no longer an ideal location for a library. The building was not specifically built to house the weight of books and book shelves. There was concern about the safety of the library—after housing the heavy book collection for 15 years—and in 1962 a comprehensive study was commissioned to find out what amenities were desired by the community. It was determined that the library was inadequate to serve the community, so change was necessary.

In 1963, a new temporary location was found at what became Bridgeman's at 9th Street North and Mainstreet (now Law Offices). David Smith was the library director at the time, and he remembers hauling the entire collection of books to the new location in the heat of the summer, including at least one trip in a large dump truck. When they began moving in, the shelving hadn't been delivered, so they created temporary stacks from cement blocks and planks, which had been donated by Justus Lumber. Various community organizations also donated furniture and other items to the new library. While at the temporary location, a new library was planned, but it soon became clear that funding would be tight. At the time there was a federal grant program set up to encourage public libraries to flourish; conditions included a mandate that the building had to serve as a library for 20 years and that the city also had to contribute funds to the project. There were a few twists and turns, but finally the grant came through, and in 1968 the Hopkins Library was built where it stands today: at 22 11th Ave. North.

Besides Minneapolis, Hopkins remained the final independent library in the county. After the survey found enhancements were needed, the city doubled funding for the library. Soon after the library moved opened in its new location the possibility of merging with Hennepin County Library was an option. A packed community meeting was held in 1970 to discuss the possibility of a merger and although there was still some resistance, the merger passed, and in 1973 the Hopkins Library became a member of the Hennepin County Library System.

There remained in the collection some 1,000 books in Czech. The community had held on to these books even though most Hopkins residents no longer could read Czech or speak the language. Finally in the 1990s, they were donated first to The Hopkins History Center and then to the University of Minnesota Immigration Research Center, where to this day they are a valuable resource in the study of Czechoslovakia. In 2002, the Hopkins library closed for nine months to undergo a significant remodeling that resulted in a more efficient floor plan, more computers and overall better customer service. A new layout, fixtures, art and an enhanced library environment overall complemented other redevelopment projects on Main Street. Since then, further improvements have been made, including an expanded teen area as well as a lounge along the front windows.

In August 2010 a new early literacy play area called "Mainstreet" was specifically designed and built for the Hopkins Library by the Minnesota Children's Museum. Historically, The Friends of the Hopkins Library have played a key role in supporting the library. Membership dues and funds from Friends' book sales have bought new furnishings, books for young readers, beautiful stained glass and year-round programs for all ages.

A renovation of Hopkins Library was finished in 2015. More information on Hopkins Library history can be found at the Hopkins Historical Society.
