= Allensworth School District =

School district in California

Address
- 3320 Young Road Allensworth, California, 93219; United States

District information
- Type: Public, Single-school district
- Grades: K–8
- Superintendent: Robert Cardenas
- Budget: $10,433 per student
- NCES District ID: 0601980

Students and staff
- Students: 67 (2020–2021)
- Teachers: 4.53 (FTE)
- Staff: 4.18 (FTE)
- Student–teacher ratio: 14.79:1

Other information
- Website: www.allensworthesd.org

Allensworth School District is a public school district in the town of Allensworth in Tulare County, California. It includes a single school serving grades K through 8.

== Demographics ==
- Economically disadvantaged 97.2%
- English language learners 53.8%
- Students with disabilities 0.0%
- American Indian 0.0%
- Asian 0.0%
- Pacific Islander 0.0%
- Filipino 0.0%
- Hispanic 56.9%
- African American 43.1%
- White 0.0%
- Multiple/no response 0.0%
