= Colonel Allensworth State Historic Park =

Preserve hosting California's first Black-owned town

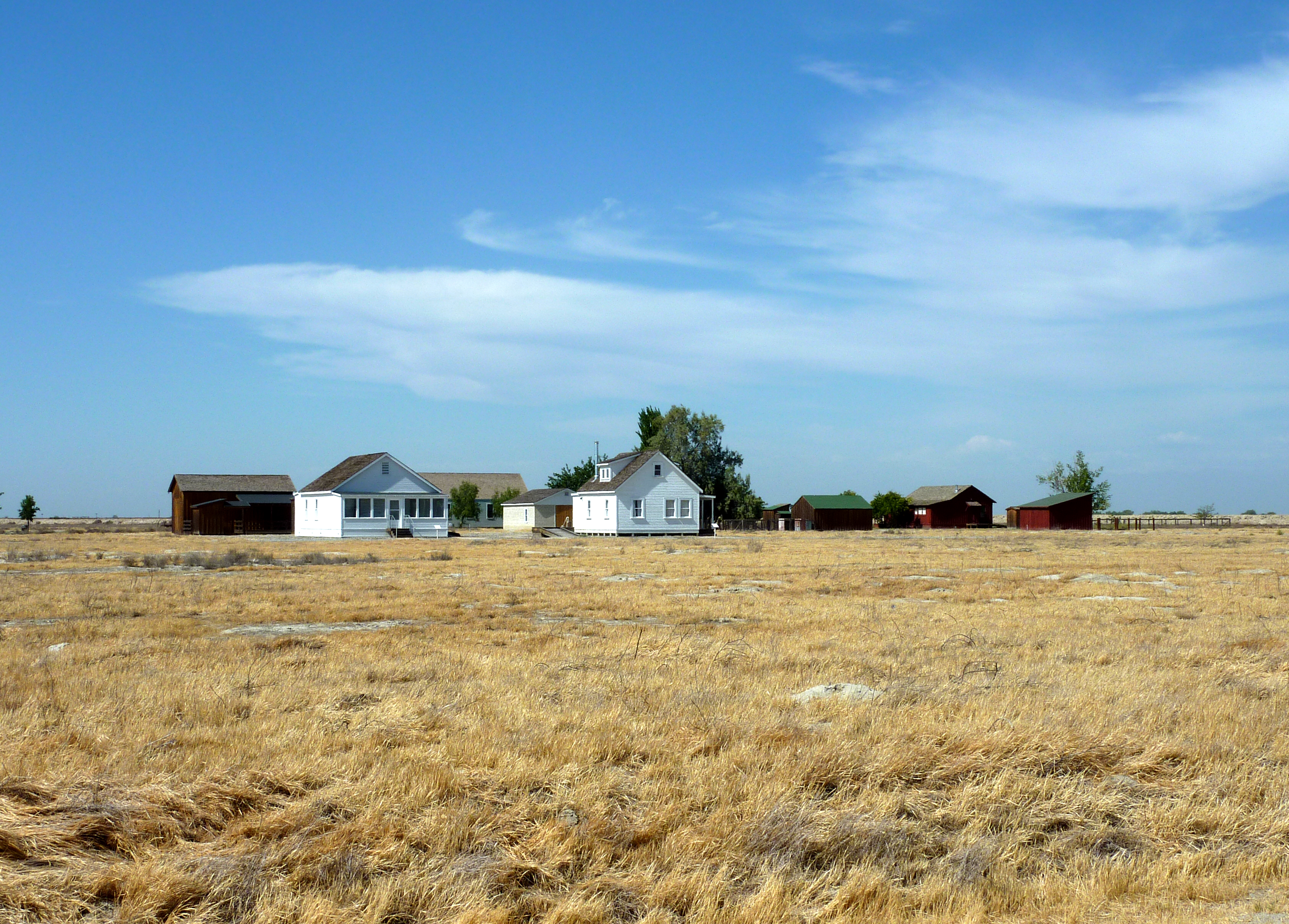
- The restored buildings in Allensworth rise from the San Joaquin Valley

- Location within California Location within the United States
- Location: Tulare County, California; United States
- Nearest city: Earlimart, California
- Coordinates: 35°51′49″N 119°23′20″W
- Area: 3,715 acres (15.03 km^{2})
- Established: 1973
- Governing body: California Department of Parks and Recreation
- Allensworth Historic District
- U.S. National Register of Historic Places
- U.S. Historic district
- Built: 1908
- NRHP reference No.: 72000263
- Added to NRHP: February 23, 1972

California Historical Landmark
- Reference no.: 1047

Colonel Allensworth State Historic Park is a state park unit of California, United States, preserving Allensworth, the only California town to be founded, financed and governed by African Americans. The small farming community was founded in 1908 by Lt. Colonel Allen Allensworth, Professor William Payne, William Peck, a minister; John W. Palmer, a miner; and Harry A. Mitchell, a real estate agent, dedicated to improving the economic and social status of African Americans. Colonel Allensworth (1842–1914) had a friendship with Booker T. Washington and was inspired by the Tuskegee Institute and development in its neighboring town. Allensworth hoped to develop the "Tuskegee of the West".

Uncontrollable circumstances, including a drop in the area's water table, resulted in the town's demise. Allensworth is now an unincorporated area in Tulare County.

The park has a train station on the Gold Runner line that is used during special events at the park, or when large tour groups book a stop.

== History ==
=== Early history ===
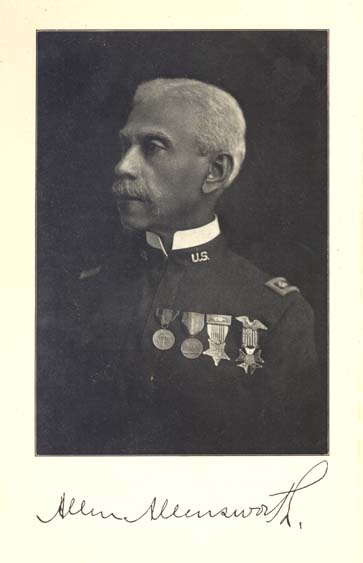
Lt. Colonel Allen Allensworth

In 1908, United States Army veteran Lt. Colonel Allen Allensworth and Professor William Payne, Rev. William Peck and John W. Palmer, and Harry A. Mitchell sought to build a town where African Americans could own property, learn, and live the American Dream. They chose an 800-acre (320 ha) Tulare County site for a new town near the present location of Earlimart, California, and about 45 miles (72 km) north of Bakersfield. The site was chosen for fertile soil, adequate water, and its location along a railroad corridor. Black men and women — craftsmen, artisans, businessmen, farmers, ranchers, retired military — moved their families to the newly purchased land. In 1914, the California Eagle newspaper stated that Allensworth deeded land was worth more than $112,000. The affairs of the town were administered by a council form of government known as the Allensworth Progressive Association, which directed the community through its formative and critical early years. Men and women held responsible positions in the community.

Allensworth's economy depended on agriculture; farmers cultivated alfalfa, wheat, sugar beets, and cotton; and raised dairy cattle, chickens, turkeys, and Belgian hares. The town had several businesses and public buildings: bakery, drugstore, livery stable, barbershop, church, school, library, and a machine shop. Sources such as the Oakland Sunshine, a leading black Oakland, California newspaper, in 1913 claimed that Allensworth generated nearly $5,000 monthly in its business ventures.

In 1910 Joshua and Henrietta Singleton opened Singleton's General Store & Post Office. The store sold a variety of merchandise and served as a weigh station for wagons. The Allensworth Hotel was opened by Clara and John Morris; the hotel had eight guestrooms and charged 75 cents per night.

=== Water problems ===
In 1908 the southwest corner of Tulare County had abundant water from wells drilled into the then-shallow water table. The artesian wells and water mains laid throughout the residences during and since 1912 were controlled by Allensworth Rural Water Company, a state corporation. But water problems began developing in 1912 and by 1914 had become serious. The declining water tables throughout the area and increasing problems with alkali salts helped to doom the community. As the original settlers moved away, the land values declined, some of the houses were left empty, and others were rented or sold.

By the 1950s Allensworth was an impoverished area without drinkable water supplies; its only water wells were contaminated with arsenic, and state health officials declared them unusable. When the state acquired the land for park purposes, state officials said land owners were paid "market value" but because these values were so low, the state also provided financial assistance to relocate the former owners. According to State Park Ranger Greg Kauffman, "only two or three families were unhappy with the move". And, he said, "the project itself has received strong support".

=== Colonel Allensworth's death ===
Colonel Allensworth died on September 14, 1914 at Monrovia Hospital after being hit by a tandem motorcycle driven by D.S. White (with William E. Wray listed as passenger). Allensworth had just stepped off of a train and was en route to speak at a church. The California Eagle newspaper wrote that Allensworth was walking on Myrtle Avenue, "a sixty-foot boulevard," when "he was overtaken and struck down by a motorcycle ridden by two young caucasians. The bruised and bleeding form was rushed to the hospital at Monrovia where death came after two days of unconsciousness." Allensworth was listed as having broken "both legs, one arm, collar bone and skull" in the ordeal. Burial paperwork from the Angelus-Rosedale Cemetery lists Allensworth's cause of death as "Fracture of skull" due to an accident.

White and Wray claimed they were only going about 12 miles per hour, but many people on at the scene "believed the motorcycle must have been going at high speed, and that Colonel Allensworth had little opportunity to save himself." The coroner's jury quickly returned an "open verdict" exonerating White and Wray from any blame, which led Assistant District Attorney Richardson to advise local law enforcement to not arrest the men.

In 1919 Delilah L. Beasley wrote in her book The Negro Trail-Blazers of California:

"The death of Colonel Allensworth was most tragic, because after passing through three wars, he was finally killed by a careless motorcyclist on the streets of Monrovia, California, a few miles out from Los Angeles, the accident occurring on a Sunday morning in September, 1914. The aged Colonel was on his way to preach in a small church of the village and had just stepped from a Pacific Electric street car when these men knocked him down and ran over him, killing him through their careless driving, his death, occurring within twenty-four hours afterwards without his regaining consciousness, it was like a thunderbolt from a clear sky to the people of the State. He had spent the two years previous in dictating and assisting Professor Charles Alexander to write his autobiography."

The book had been sent to the publishers and was ready to come off the press when he was killed.

Widely loved and respected, Allensworth received a military funeral by the Grand Army of the Republic veterans of Los Angeles. Memorial services were held for him throughout the state and nation. He was interred at Rosedale Cemetery in Los Angeles on September 18, 1914. The Allensworth community was devastated. Although Professor William Payne and Oscar Overr assumed the leadership of the colony, no one could replace the Colonel. Without Allensworth's spiritual guidance and leadership, the community began to disintegrate. By 1920, the two leading figures, William Payne and the widow Josephine Allensworth, had left the area. Payne accepted a teaching job in El Centro, while Josephine Allensworth returned to Los Angeles to live with her daughter Nella. The exodus of residents continued during the years of the Great Depression and World War II.

=== California State Historic Park ===
In 1968 Cornelius "Ed" Pope, a former resident of Allensworth, worked in Sacramento as a draftsman and planner for the California Department of Parks and Recreation. With the help of a professor at California State University, Sacramento, he wrote a proposal to restore the Allensworth settlement as a state historical site. In 1972 "Allensworth Historic District" was added to the National Register of Historic Places. Finally, in 1974 then-Governor Ronald Reagan authorized the department to establish the park. Colonel Allensworth State Historic Park was established on 240 acres (97 ha) in 1976. Ed Pope returned to the area in his retirement "to become a preservation activist on the scene."

The 100th anniversary of Allensworth was celebrated in October 2008. Events are held throughout the year to commemorate the park's history.

The preserved townsite features nine restored buildings, including a schoolhouse, a hotel, a general store, and library and several homes. The park has a visitor center, and tours are available by making arrangements with the park in advance. The visitor center features a video presentation, "The Spirit of Allensworth."

Fifteen campsites, open all year, accommodate RVs or tents. Each site includes a picnic table and a camp stove; flush toilets are nearby. Facilities accessible to people with disabilities are available. Turf, trees, and shade ramadas are other features. A nearby picnic area is shaded by 75 large trees, planted by the California Conservation Corps.

The park is 10 miles (16 km) southwest of Earlimart on County Road J22, just west of the Central Valley Highway [SR-43].

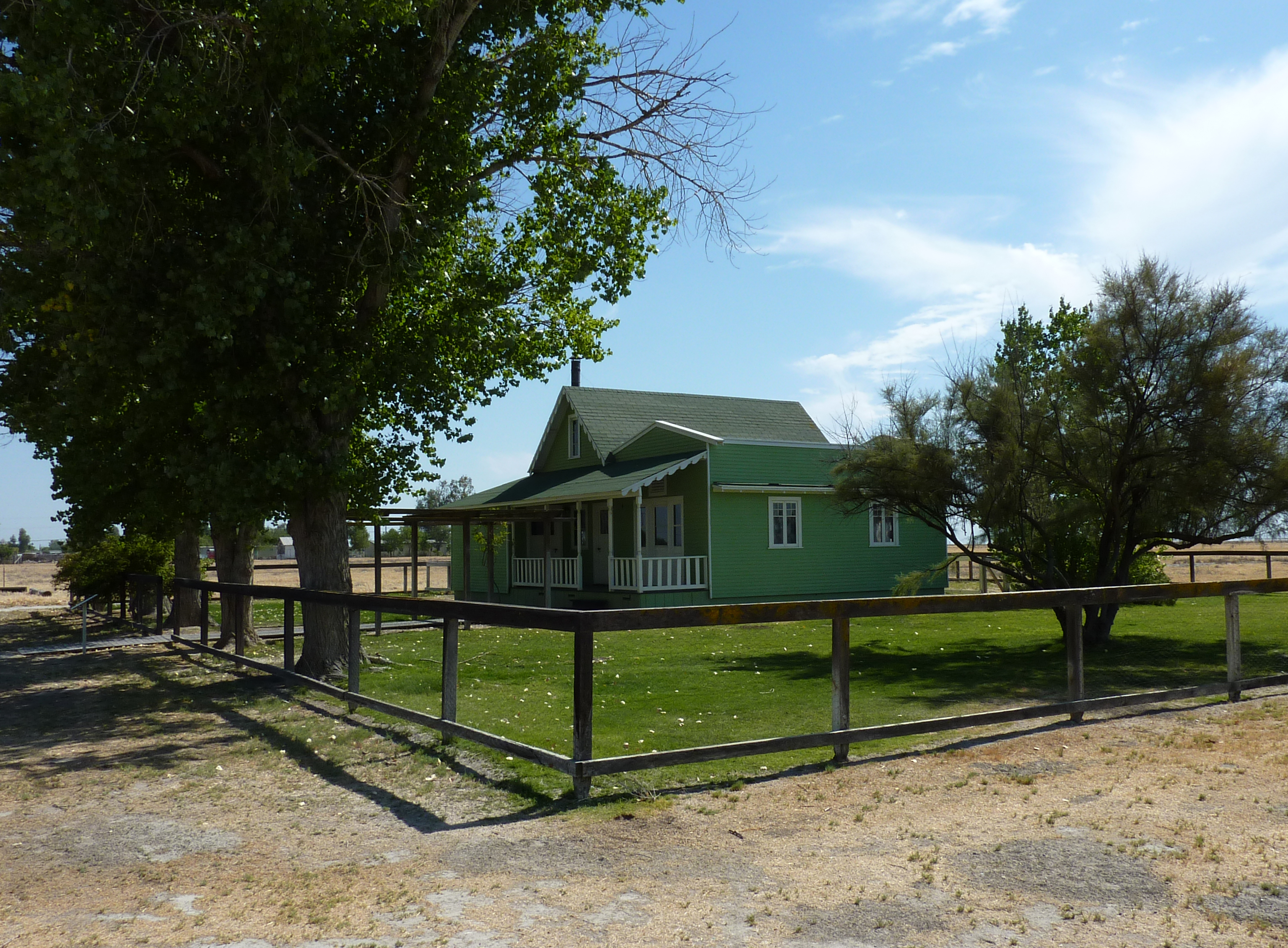
Allensworth House

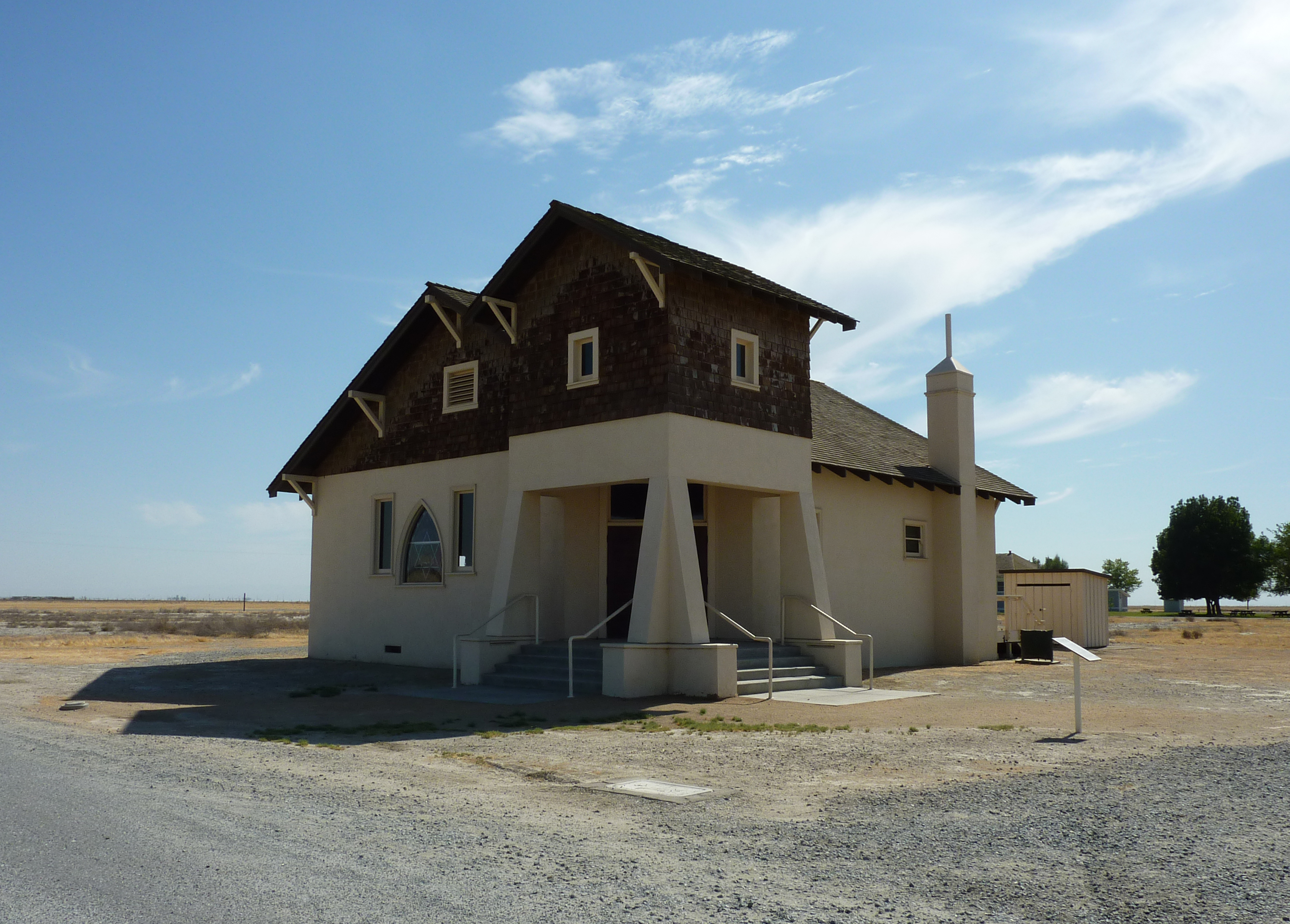
First Baptist Church

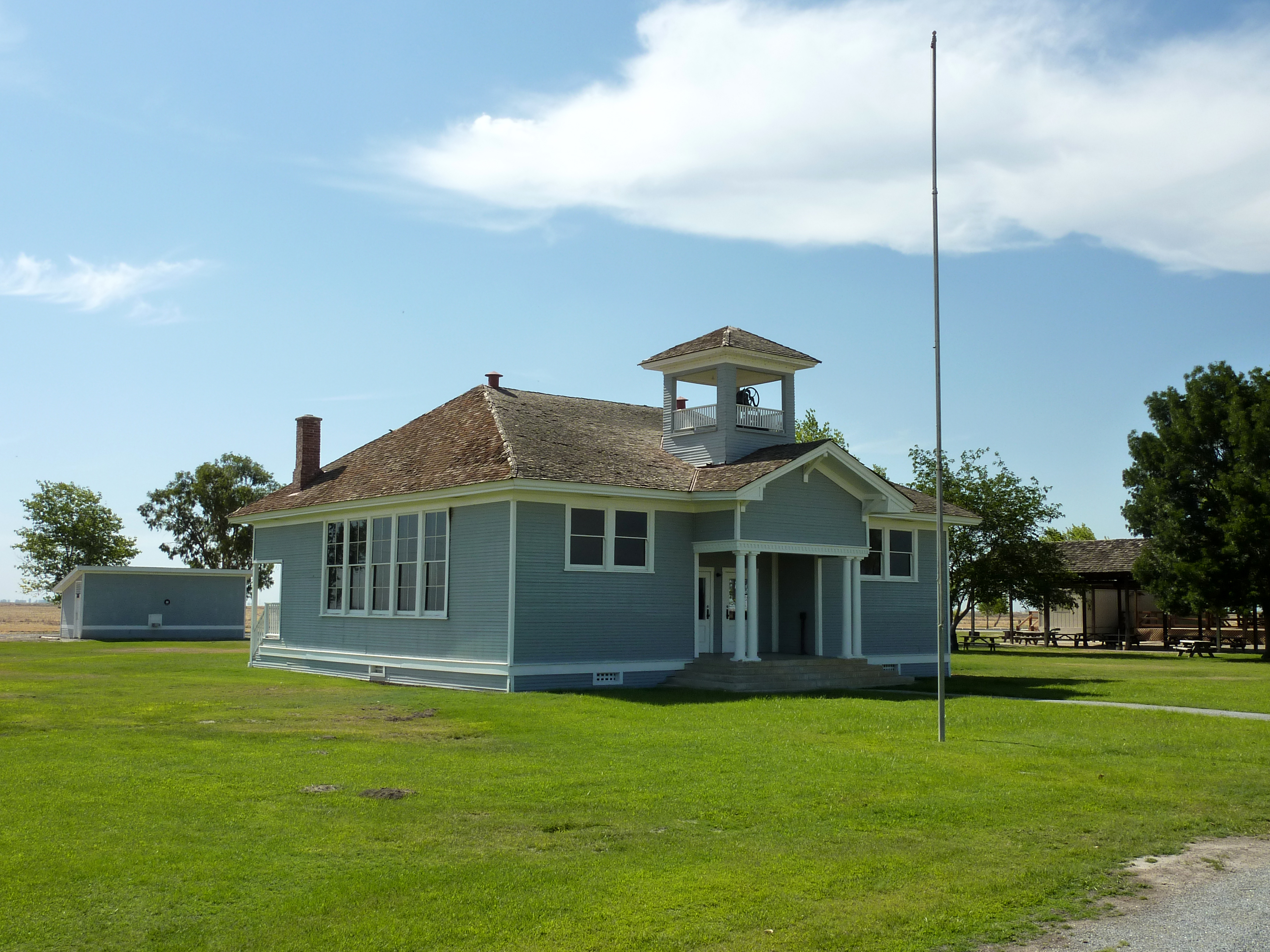
Allensworth Elementary School

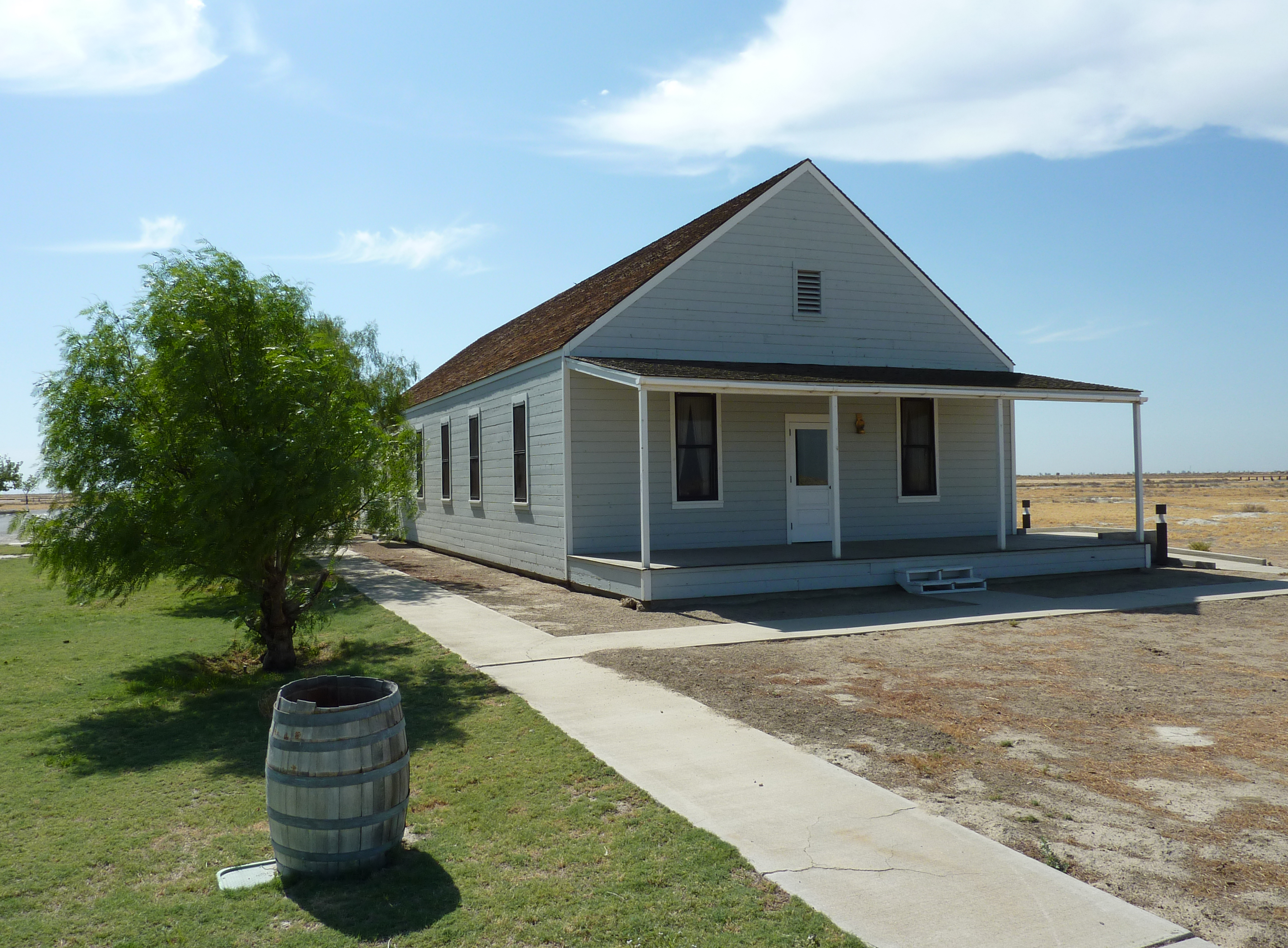
Allensworth Hotel

Singleton's General Store & Post Office

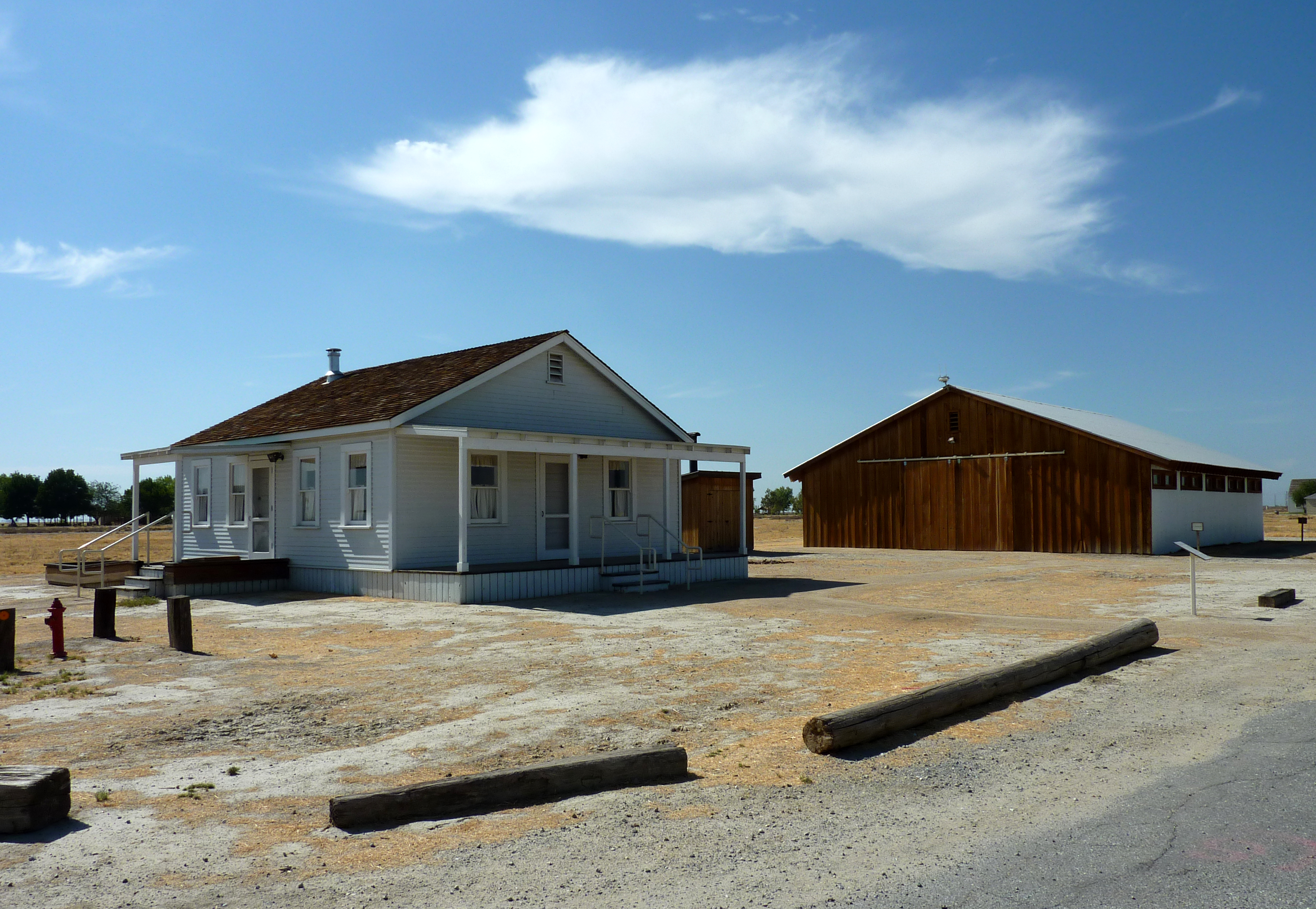
Dodson House and Restaurant; Blacksmith Area (right)

== Terrain and environment ==
The terrain is typical of the southern San Joaquin Valley. Excepting the railroad roadbed, there is less than 5 feet (1.5 m) elevation difference across town. Like most of the valley, there has been some subsidence probably related to historic overpumping of ground water for irrigation.

A generally warm, dry climate prevails in the Central Valley; it is hot in the summer, mild in the winter. In the Central Valley precipitation falls mainly from October through April. Winter temperatures well below freezing producing frost; however, snow is very rare. Summer temperatures above 100 °F (38 °C) are part of the normal pattern.

The valley was historically the site of vernal pools and seasonal lakes before 20th-century diversions of water and agriculture. A natural gas well field exists west of town. Burrowing owls, a species active in daylight hours, are sometimes present in the park.

Just north of Allensworth is the 6,389-acre (2,586 ha) Pixley National Wildlife Refuge, operated by the United States Fish and Wildlife Service. Adjacent to the town is the Allensworth Ecological Reserve. The endangered San Joaquin kit fox (Vulpes macrotis mutica) can be found in this area.

In 2007 the California State Legislature passed Assembly Bill 576, which established a 2.5-mile (4.0 km) dairy-free zone around the park. The bill was drafted in response to two proposed dairies. Environmental activists had protested that the dairy operations were likely to have a negative impact (dairy flies and offensive odors) on the historic park, along with the adjacent Pixley National Wildlife Refuge and Allensworth Ecological Reserve.

== Amtrak station ==
Allensworth State Historic Park
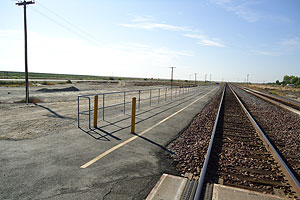
- Allensworth State Park station platform in 2012

General information
- Location: 4011 Grant Drive; Allensworth, California; United States
- Coordinates: 35°51′50″N 119°23′08″W
- Line: BNSF Bakersfield Subdivision
- Platforms: 1 side platform
- Tracks: 2

Construction
- Accessible: Yes

Other information
- Status: Conditional
- Station code: Amtrak: CNL

History
- Opened: May 9, 1992

Passengers
- FY 2025: 1,651

Services
Preceding station	Amtrak	Following station
Corcoran toward Oakland or Sacramento	Gold Runner (limited service)	Wasco toward Bakersfield
Location

The Allensworth station or Colonel Allensworth State Historic Park station is located east of the state historic park, just outside the entrance to the park near the Central Valley Highway (SR-43). The station has a platform only with no shelter. The station is served by Amtrak's Gold Runner service between Bakersfield and either Oakland or Sacramento. Trains began stopping here on May 9, 1992.

The station is a conditional stop, with the train only stopping for groups of 20 or more that make reservations several weeks in advance. Because special arrangements are required for trips to and from the station, it is absent from many of Amtrak’s lists of active stations. Scheduled, public service is offered during special events at the park, such as the annual Juneteenth celebration and the rededication event held every October.

In fiscal year 2025, 1,651 passengers boarded or detrained at Colonel Allensworth State Historic Park station.

Gold Runner trains are expected to cease services here once California High-Speed Rail operations begin.

=== Restored railroad boxcar ===
One of two 19th-century wooden boxcars associated with Allensworth was conserved by the California State Railroad Museum for display at the park. Both 30-foot cars were believed to have been built in the 1880s for the Gulf, Colorado and Santa Fe Railway, a subsidiary of the Atchison, Topeka and Santa Fe Railway (ATSF). After the turn of the 20th century, the wheels were removed from the cars and they were used to house ATSF employees working at the station in Allensworth. California State Parks contracted with the nonprofit California State Railroad Museum Foundation in 2002 to restore the cars. One was dismantled to provide information and parts. The other received museum-level conservation for display at the park near the current station. The car is considered to be a rare preserved example of an early railroad freight car.
