= Josephine Leavell Allensworth =

American musician and activist (1855–1938)

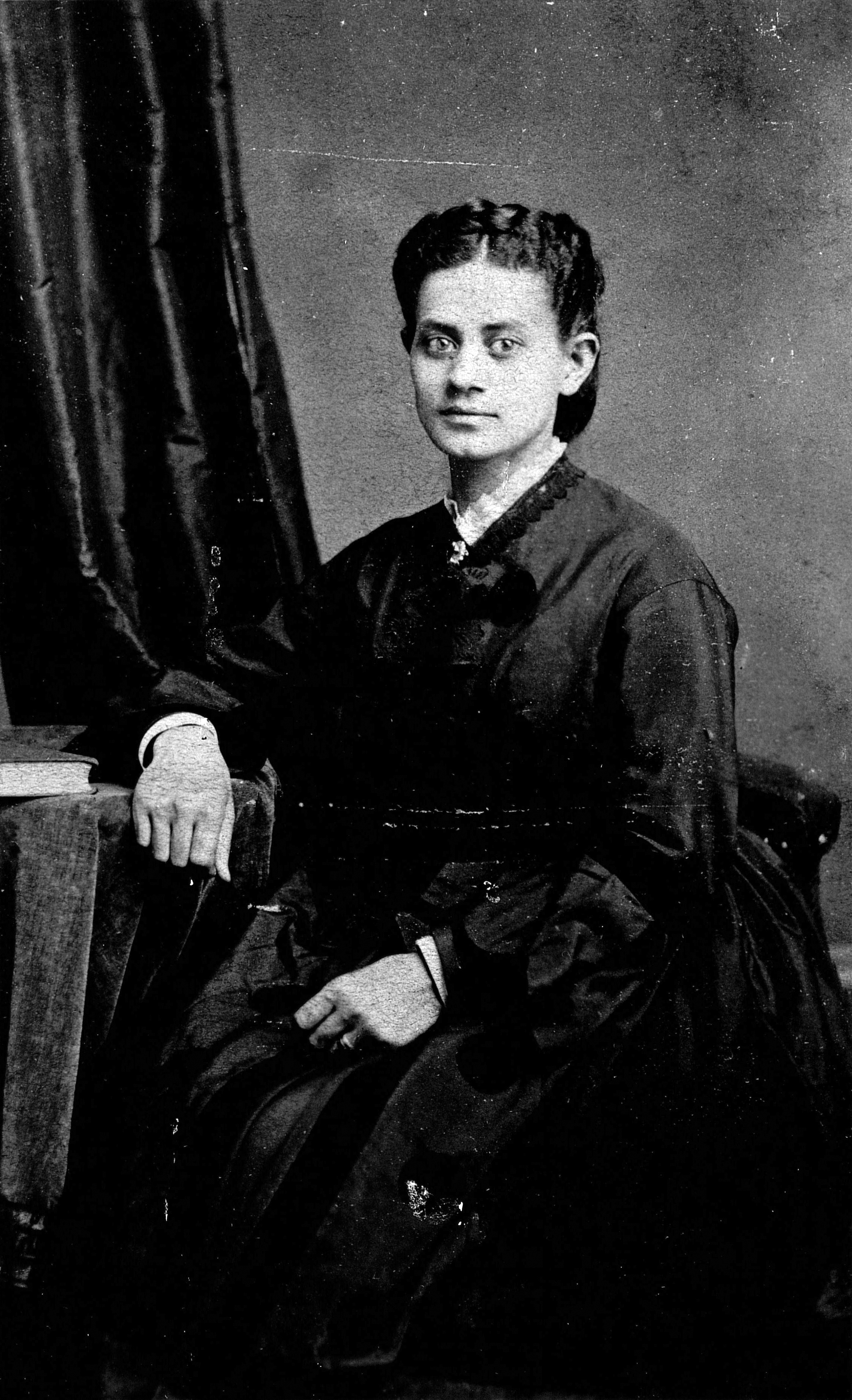

Background information
- Also known as: Josie Allensworth
- Born: Josephine Leavell; 1855; Trenton, Kentucky, United States
- Died: 1938 (aged 82–83) Los Angeles, California, United States
- Occupations: Musician, music teacher
- Instrument: Organ
- Spouse: Allen Allensworth

Josephine Leavell Allensworth, also known as Josie Allensworth (1855–1938), was an American musician, music teacher, and activist.

She co-founded Allensworth, California with her husband, after a series of events, including the Great Depression and World War II, there was a wave of residents who moved out of the area. Allensworth was a small town on 40 to 50 families in 1985. About 240 acres of Allensworth land was used to create a California State Historic Park called Colonel Allensworth State Historic Park.

== Personal life ==
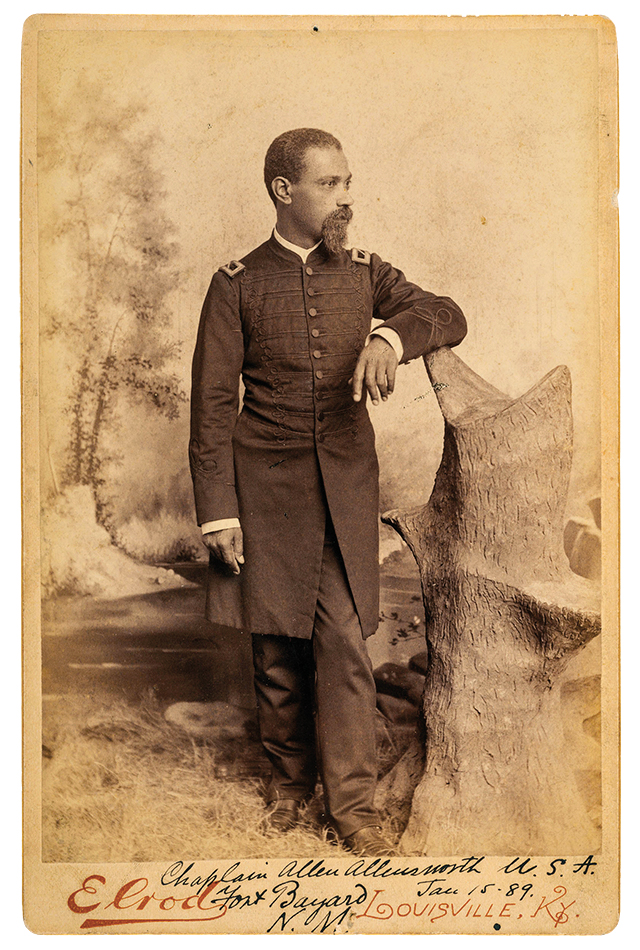
1889 photograph of Allen Allensworth in Fort Bayard, New Mexico

Josephine Leavell was born in Trenton, Kentucky, in April 1855. She married Allen Allensworth in 1877. He was an African-American Baptist minister in the United States Army. President Grover Cleveland appointed him as chaplain. He served in 24th Infantry Regiment, one of the Black Regiments. He was the second Black man in the United States Army to be a commanding officer.

They had two daughters, Eva (born January 1880) and Nella (born October 1881). The family lived in Fort Supply, Oklahoma, and Fort William Henry Harrison in Montana. Leavell played the organ when Allensworth hosted services. Allen was a private aide to William Howard Taft. The Allensworths lived in San Francisco in 1900. Allen Allensworth retired from the Army with the rank of lieutenant colonel in 1906.

== Allensworth ==
Allen and Josephine founded Allensworth, California, a place for Blacks to live free of discrimination in a town that they governed. Land for the town was purchased because it was inexpensive old farm land that had artesian wells. It was also located near the Santa Fe Railroad line. Ranchers, farmers, skilled workers, teachers, and business people were lured to the town in south Tulare County, California.

Several events led to the closing of the town. Allen, who was the leader of the town, died in an accident in 1914. Over time, the town experienced a shortage of water. The Great Depression and World War II drew people to places with greater opportunities. More people left when three of the town's wells were found to have arsenic in 1965. Wishing to maintain the historic town, supporters lobbied to make the area a park. Governor Ronald Reagan signed the legislation to make a park from some of the land in 1973. There is still the small town of Allensworth, in 1985, there were about 40 to 50 families living there. A grant provided the funding for a 10,000 gallon holding tank for water.

About 240 acres from Allensworth was used to create the California State Historic Park, Colonel Allensworth State Historic Park, which became part of the state park system in 1973. It was updated in 1985 from funding attained from historic development section of the California Parks and Recreation Facilities Act of 1984.

== Women's Improvement League ==
While living in Allensworth, Leavell founded the Women's Improvement League. She also provided the land for the founding of the Mary Dickinson Memorial Library. The founding of the library developed out of a library being approved by the Allensworth Board of Trustees. The reading room they approved was too small for the community. Leavell therefore created the property to develop more land for a larger library. The library is named after her mother and was completed in July 1913. The building of the library cost $500. It could hold 1,000 books. The Allensworths donated their personal book collection to the library. She was also a school board member.

== Later years and death ==
Allen Allensworth was hit by a motorcyclist in Monrovia, California. He died at the hospital on September 14, 1914.

In 1922, Leavell moved to Los Angeles to live with her daughter, Nella, who was married to Louis Blogett. As a resident in Los Angeles, Leavell fought for racial integration in swimming pools and other venues. Leavell lived in Los Angeles until her death in 1938.
