= Oakland Sunshine =

American newspaper in Oakland, California (1897–1922)

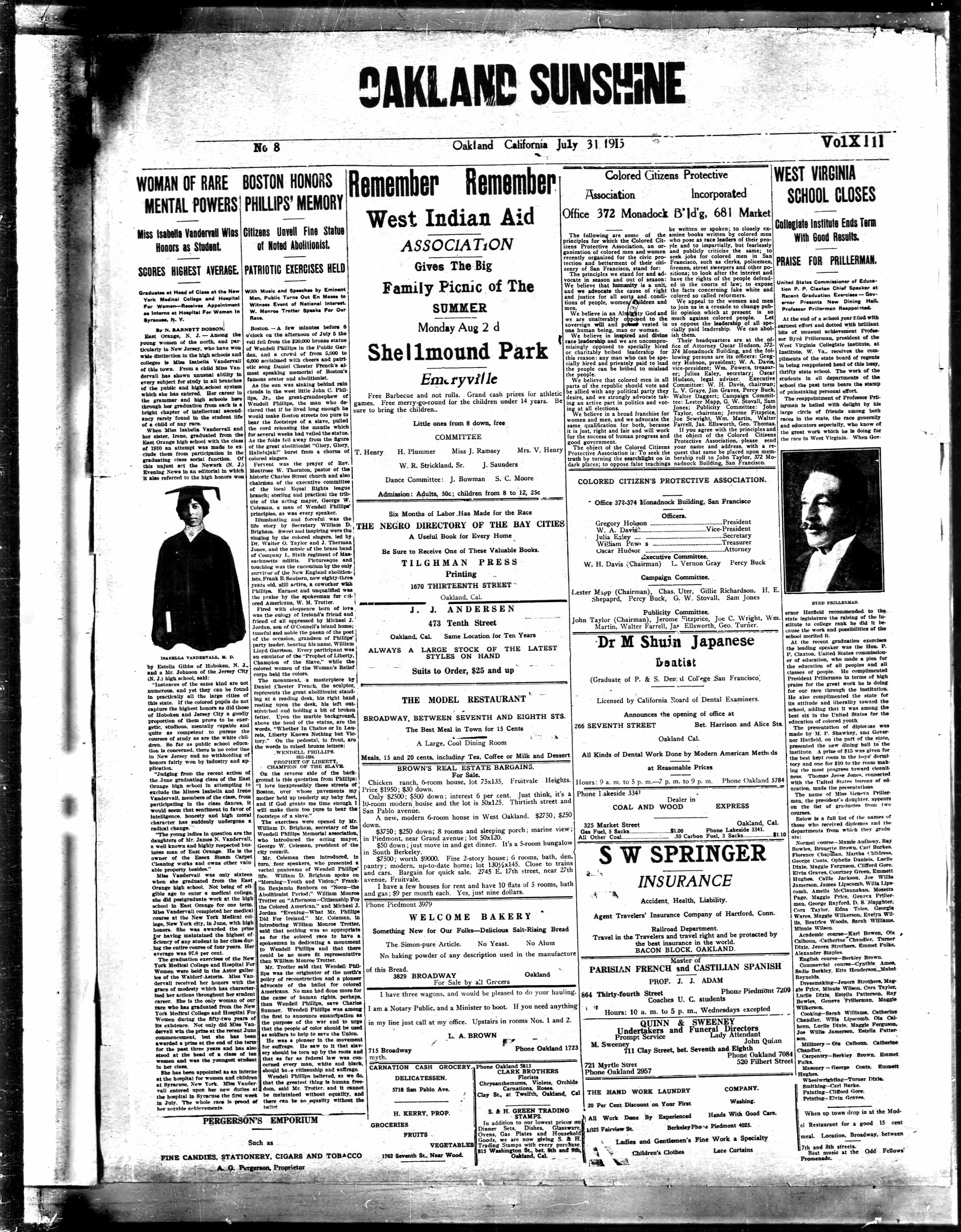
- Oakland Sunshine, July 1915
- Founder: John A. Wilds
- Publisher: J.M. Bridges
- Editor: John A. Wilds
- Founded: 1897
- Ceased publication: 1922
- Headquarters: 855 Broadway, Oakland, California, U.S.
- ISSN: 2995-6498
- OCLC number: 10384635

Oakland Sunshine (1897–1922) was an early African-American newspaper in Oakland, California, U.S.

The Oakland Sunshine newspaper was founded and edited by John A. Wilds (1845–1921). It was located at 855 Broadway in Downtown Oakland; and published weekly by J.M. Bridges, and sometimes the Tilghman Press. Delilah Beasley wrote a column for the newspaper in 1915.

== See also ==
- List of African American newspapers in California
