= Fort Bayard, New Mexico =

- Unincorporated community
- Location within New Mexico Location within the United States
- Coordinates: 32°47′46″N 108°09′01″W
- Country: United States
- State: New Mexico
- County: Grant
- Elevation: 6,119 ft (1,865 m)
- Time zone: UTC-7 (Mountain (MST))
  - Summer (DST): UTC-6 (MDT)
- ZIP code: 88036
- Area code: 575
- GNIS feature ID: 906335

Fort Bayard is an unincorporated community, in Grant County, New Mexico, United States.

== History ==
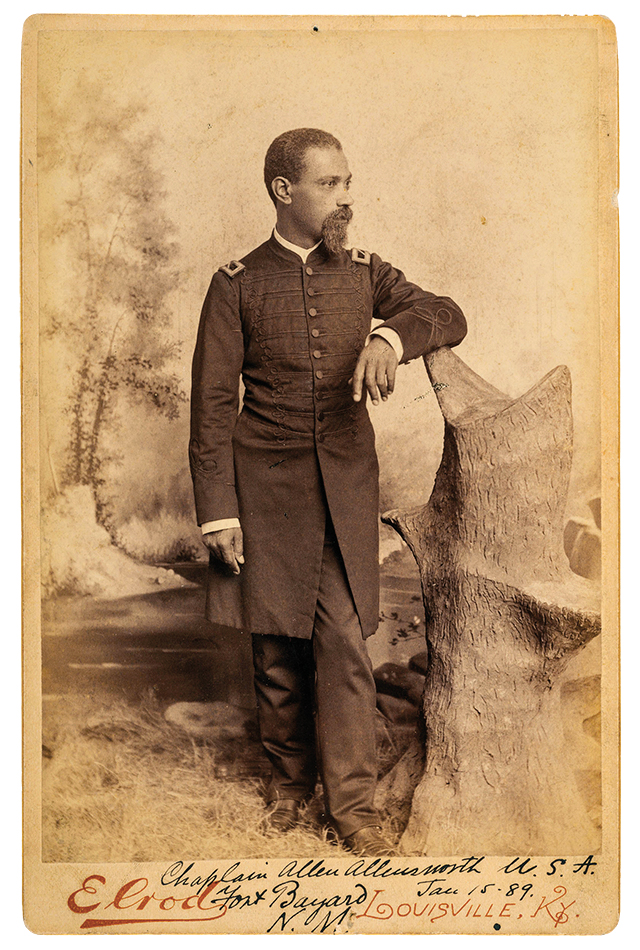
Allen Allensworth photographed in Fort Bayard, 1889

In 1888, Kentuckian chaplain Allen Allensworth moved with his regiment to Fort Bayard, becoming a military educator. In 1889, Allensworth published the pamphlet Outline of Course of Study, and The Rules Governing Post Schools of Ft. Bayard, N.M., which became a military education standard.

Also in 1888, United States Army officer Geoffrey Keyes was born in Fort Bayard; he would become significant for his time in Italy during World War II.

In 1926, Supreme Court judge Harry Stowers was born in Fort Bayard.

== Climate ==
Fort Bayard has a hot-summer Mediterranean climate (Köppen Csa) with hot summers and mild winters

Climate data for Fort Bayard, New Mexico (1991–2020 normals, extremes 1897–2011)
Month	Jan	Feb	Mar	Apr	May	Jun	Jul	Aug	Sep	Oct	Nov	Dec	Year
Record high °F (°C)	78 (26)	84 (29)	85 (29)	95 (35)	99 (37)	106 (41)	104 (40)	102 (39)	100 (38)	90 (32)	81 (27)	73 (23)	106 (41)
Mean maximum °F (°C)	66.0 (18.9)	68.8 (20.4)	74.7 (23.7)	81.1 (27.3)	89.2 (31.8)	96.6 (35.9)	96.7 (35.9)	92.2 (33.4)	88.3 (31.3)	83.7 (28.7)	73.5 (23.1)	66.2 (19.0)	98.6 (37.0)
Mean daily maximum °F (°C)	55.6 (13.1)	59.1 (15.1)	66.1 (18.9)	72.7 (22.6)	80.1 (26.7)	90.2 (32.3)	88.4 (31.3)	86.9 (30.5)	83.2 (28.4)	74.2 (23.4)	63.5 (17.5)	55.3 (12.9)	72.9 (22.7)
Daily mean °F (°C)	43.6 (6.4)	46. (8)	51.8 (11.0)	57.8 (14.3)	65.1 (18.4)	74.8 (23.8)	76.0 (24.4)	74.9 (23.8)	70.7 (21.5)	60.6 (15.9)	50.5 (10.3)	42.8 (6.0)	59.6 (15.3)
Mean daily minimum °F (°C)	31.6 (−0.2)	33.6 (0.9)	37.5 (3.1)	43.0 (6.1)	50.2 (10.1)	59.5 (15.3)	63.7 (17.6)	62.8 (17.1)	58.1 (14.5)	47.0 (8.3)	37.4 (3.0)	30.3 (−0.9)	46.2 (7.9)
Mean minimum °F (°C)	15.9 (−8.9)	18.1 (−7.7)	22.2 (−5.4)	27.2 (−2.7)	36.0 (2.2)	46.2 (7.9)	54.3 (12.4)	53.9 (12.2)	46.0 (7.8)	30.3 (−0.9)	19.4 (−7.0)	14.4 (−9.8)	12.0 (−11.1)
Record low °F (°C)	−12 (−24)	−6 (−21)	7 (−14)	13 (−11)	23 (−5)	30 (−1)	42 (6)	38 (3)	29 (−2)	19 (−7)	1 (−17)	−3 (−19)	−12 (−24)
Average precipitation inches (mm)	1.07 (27)	0.91 (23)	0.48 (12)	0.32 (8.1)	0.57 (14)	0.84 (21)	3.91 (99)	2.93 (74)	2.10 (53)	0.99 (25)	0.85 (22)	1.22 (31)	16.19 (411)
Average snowfall inches (cm)	0.3 (0.76)	0.3 (0.76)	0.0 (0.0)	0.0 (0.0)	0.0 (0.0)	0.0 (0.0)	0.0 (0.0)	0.0 (0.0)	0.0 (0.0)	0.0 (0.0)	trace	1.0 (2.5)	1.6 (4.02)
Average precipitation days (≥ 0.01 inch)	5.8	5.9	4.8	2.4	3.4	4.7	14.6	13.2	7.4	5.3	3.4	5.9	76.8
Average snowy days (≥ 0.1 in)	0.3	0.1	0.0	0.0	0.0	0.0	0.0	0.0	0.0	0.0	0.1	0.3	0.8
Source: NOAA (snow/snow days 1981–2010)
