= Allen Allensworth =

American chaplain, colonel, city founder, and theologian (1842–1914)

Lt. Col. Allen Allensworth
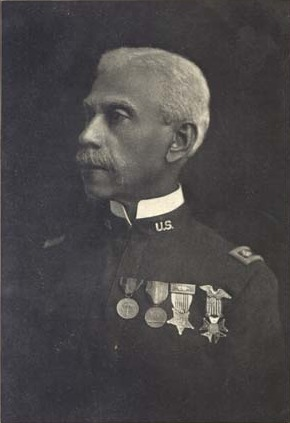
- Photograph from his 1914 biography
- Born: April 7, 1842; Louisville, Kentucky, US
- Died: September 14, 1914 (aged 72); Monrovia, California, US
- Burial place: Angelus-Rosedale Cemetery; Los Angeles, California
- Spouse: Josephine Leavell Allensworth
- Military career
- Allegiance: United States
- Branch: United States Navy, United States Army
- Rank: Lieutenant colonel
- Other work: Founder, Allensworth, California

Allen Allensworth (April 7, 1842 – September 14, 1914) was an American chaplain, colonel, city founder, and theologian. Born into slavery in Kentucky, he escaped during the American Civil War by joining the 44th Illinois Volunteers as a Union soldier. After being ordained as a Baptist minister by the Fifth Street Baptist Church, April 9, 1871, he worked as a teacher, led several churches, and was appointed as a chaplain in the United States Army. In 1886, he gained appointment as a military chaplain to a unit of Buffalo Soldiers in the West, becoming the first African American to reach the rank of lieutenant colonel in the United States Army. He served in the Army for 20 years, retiring in 1906.

Allensworth was a prolific public speaker, embarking on a speaking tour with the goal of inspiring Black youth. His lectures included Five Manly Virtues Exemplified, The Battle of Life and How to Fight It, and Character and How to Read It. While on tour in Pasadena, he met William Alexander Payne, a professor. In 1908, Allensworth, Payne, and a small committee founded Allensworth, California, the first community established, financed, and governed entirely by African Americans. It continues to be restored and maintained as the Colonel Allensworth State Historic Park.

== Early life and education ==
Born into slavery in Louisville, Kentucky in 1842, (Note: The National Park Service's Sailor record for Allensworth states that he was born in New York, New York.) Allensworth was the youngest of thirteen children of Phyllis (c. 1782 – 1878) and Levi Allensworth. Over the years, their family was scattered: his sister Lila escaped with her intended husband to Canada via the Underground Railroad; and the older boys William, George, Frank, Levi and Major were sold downriver to plantations in the Deep South, which continued to buy enslaved workers from the Upper South to develop the cotton industry. Mary Jane was his only sibling who grew up in Kentucky and married there; she purchased her freedom in 1849, gaining stability.

His mother was enslaved by A.P. and Bett Starbird. The mistress assigned Allen as a young slave to her son Thomas. When the Starbird boy started school, Allen began to learn from him, although it was illegal. After his father died when Allen was young, his mother chose to be sold as a cook to a neighbor, the attorney Nat Wolfe. When the Starbirds found Allen was learning to read, they separated him from their son and placed him with another family, the Talbots. Mrs. Talbot, a Quaker, was kind to Allen and continued to teach him to read and write; she also took him to a Sunday school for slave children. When Bett Starbird discovered this, she took Allen back. In 1854 she made arrangements with her husband's partner John Smith to send the boy downriver to a plantation owned by John's brother Pat, in Henderson, Kentucky, to put an end to his learning. On the steamboat, the boy was placed in the care of a slave steward rather than being chained with other slaves below deck, who were being transported for sale to downriver markets.

Hebe Smith, Allen's new enslaver, assigned him to be a houseboy; she prohibited him from continuing his studies and whipped him for trying to do so. Also working in the household was a white orphan boy Eddie; the two boys became friends and helped each other. Suffering on the farm from a cruel overseer, in 1855 at age 13, Allen planned to escape to Canada. He spent two weeks hiding at a neighboring farm before returning to the Smiths for punishment. Later he ran away again. The Smiths and Starbirds agreed to sell him on the auction block in Henderson.

Allensworth was sold again in Memphis, Tennessee and shipped to New Orleans. There he was bought by Fred Scruggs, who taught him to work as an exercise boy and jockey in Jefferson, Louisiana. Unlike others, his new enslaver was pleased to learn that the boy could read; he assigned him to race his best horse.

== Civil War and freedom ==
In early 1861, the Civil War loomed, but horse racing continued. Scruggs took Allen and his horses upriver for the fall meet in Louisville. Allensworth hoped to see his mother Phyllis again, as he had learned that her last enslaver, a Rev. Bayliss, had freed her after she cared for his dying wife. He found that she had recently gone to New Orleans with a Union man to look for her sons. (She found Major in prison.) Waiting for her return, Allensworth was reunited with his sister Mary Jane, who had married and had a son. She had self-liberated by purchasing her freedom in 1849. When Phyllis Starbird returned to Louisville, Mary Jane and Allen were reunited.

While working nearby on a farm where Scruggs' deputy had placed him, Allensworth met soldiers from the 44th Illinois Volunteer Infantry Regiment, a Union unit encamped near Louisville. When he told them of wanting freedom, they invited him to join the Hospital Corps. In disguise, he marched with the unit past his old master through Louisville and off to war. After serving as a civilian nursing aide for some time, he was invited to accompany Dr. A. J. Gordon, one of the surgeons, to his home in Georgetown, Ohio. There Allensworth dined with Gordon's family, was given a room of his own, and felt he first walked as a free man. With the war continuing, on April 3, 1863, Allensworth enlisted in the US Navy, where he earned his first pay as a free man. He was soon promoted to Captain's steward and clerk, and served on the Tawah and Pittsburgh for two years. (Note: The National Park Service's Sailor detail record for Allensworth shows that he served on the Tawah and Pittsburgh in the Civil War. Charles states that he served on the gunboats Queen City and Tawah.)

== Postwar years ==
Allensworth first returned to Kentucky to work and study. In 1868, he joined his brother William in St. Louis, where they operated two restaurants. The business proved successful. However, while they were considering further expansion the brothers were falsely accused of circulating counterfeit currency. This prompted them to sell their venture and led Allensworth to return to Louisville. He worked while putting himself through the Ely Normal School, one of several new schools in the South established by the American Missionary Association. During Reconstruction, Allensworth taught at schools for freedmen and their children operated by the Freedmen's Bureau. Inspired by his own teaching, he began attending courses at the Nashville Institute, later known as the Roger Williams University, but did not graduate. The school later gave him an honorary Master of Arts.

Allensworth became involved with the Baptist Church in Louisville and attended the Fifth Street Baptist Church led by Henry Adams. He was ordained as a preacher by the Baptists in 1871. In the 1870s, Allensworth went to Tennessee to study theology. During this time he also served as a preacher in Franklin, Tennessee, south of Nashville.

In 1875, Allensworth started working as a teacher in Georgetown, Kentucky. He also served as the financial agent of the General Association of the Colored Baptists in Kentucky. They had joined to support the founding of a religious school for black teachers and preachers. Allensworth was among the founders of The State University, helped guarantee the salary of the president in the early years, and served on the Board of Trustees.

He returned to Louisville when called to be pastor of the Harney Street Baptist Church, which he reorganized, attracting many new members. They renamed it Centennial Baptist Church; it was selected as a model by the American Baptist Home Mission Society of America. Within a few years, Allensworth had increased the congregation nearly fivefold, and it built a new church.

== Marriage and family ==
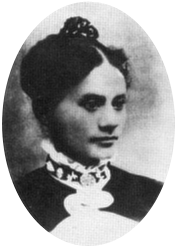
Josephine Leavell Allensworth

In 1877, he married American musician and activist Josephine Leavell (1855–1938), who also was born in Kentucky. They met while studying at Roger Williams University in Nashville, Tennessee. Leavell was an accomplished pianist, organist and music teacher.

The year of his marriage, Allensworth invited his mother to live with him and Josephine. They had several months together before she died in 1878, at the age of 96. Allensworth and Josephine had two daughters, Eva B., born about 1880, and Nella K., born about 1882. In 1900, they lived in San Francisco, California.

== Post-Reconstruction era ==
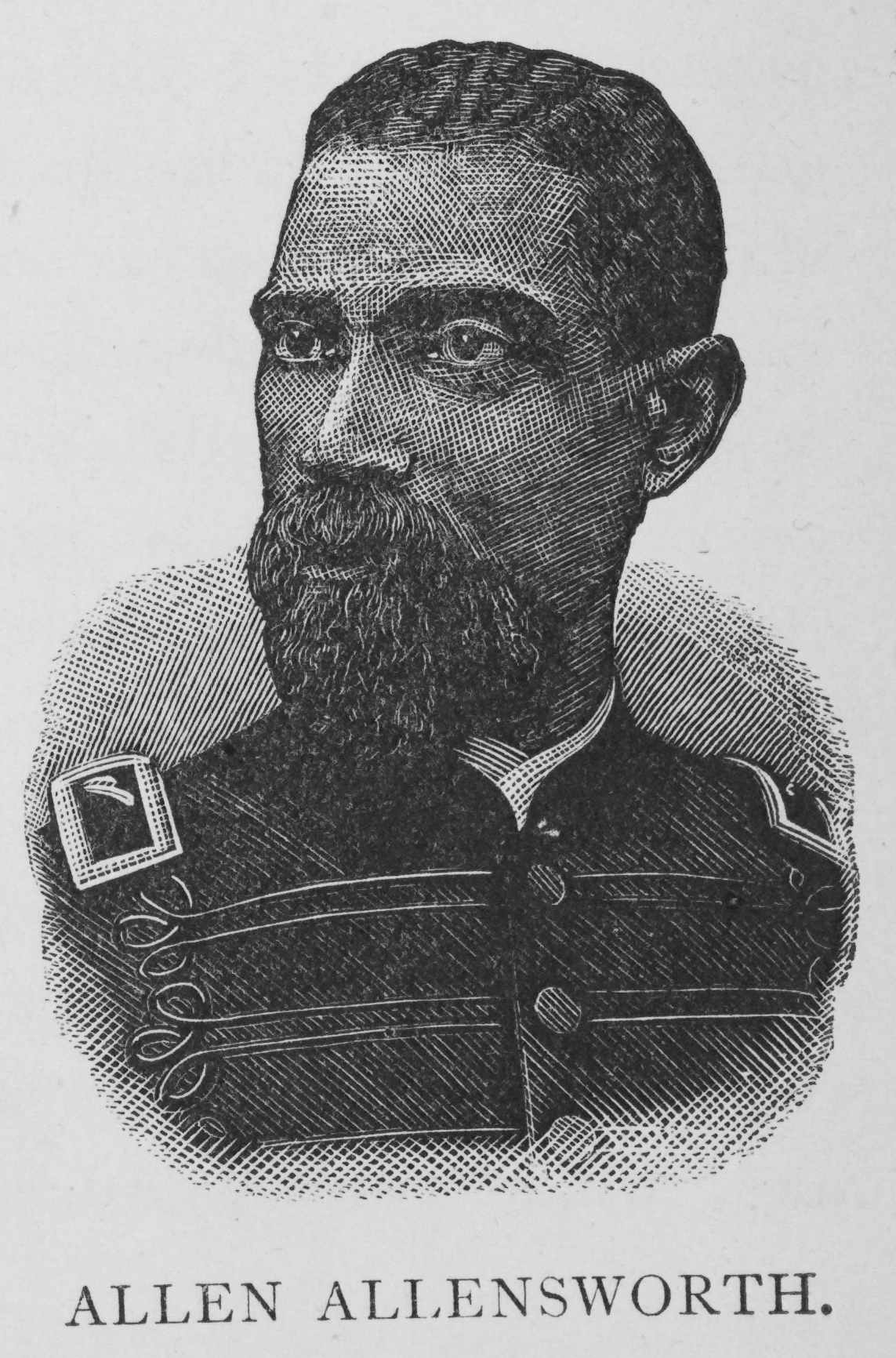
1887 illustration of Allensworth, featured in Men of Mark.

Allensworth was called to the State Street Church in Bowling Green, Kentucky. He also gave public lectures. That fall, he went to Boston to give a series of lectures, after studying public speaking in Philadelphia.

On his return, he met people from the American Baptist Publication Society in Philadelphia, who appointed him as Sunday School Missionary for the state of Kentucky. He had always worked to build up the Sunday Schools at his churches, and this gave him the chance to continue to work on education around the state. The Colored Baptist State Sunday School Convention of Kentucky appointed him to the position of State Sunday School Superintendent.

With his leadership positions and public speaking, Allensworth became increasingly interested in politics. In 1880 and 1884, he was selected as Kentucky's only black delegate to the Republican National Conventions.

== Military career as chaplain ==
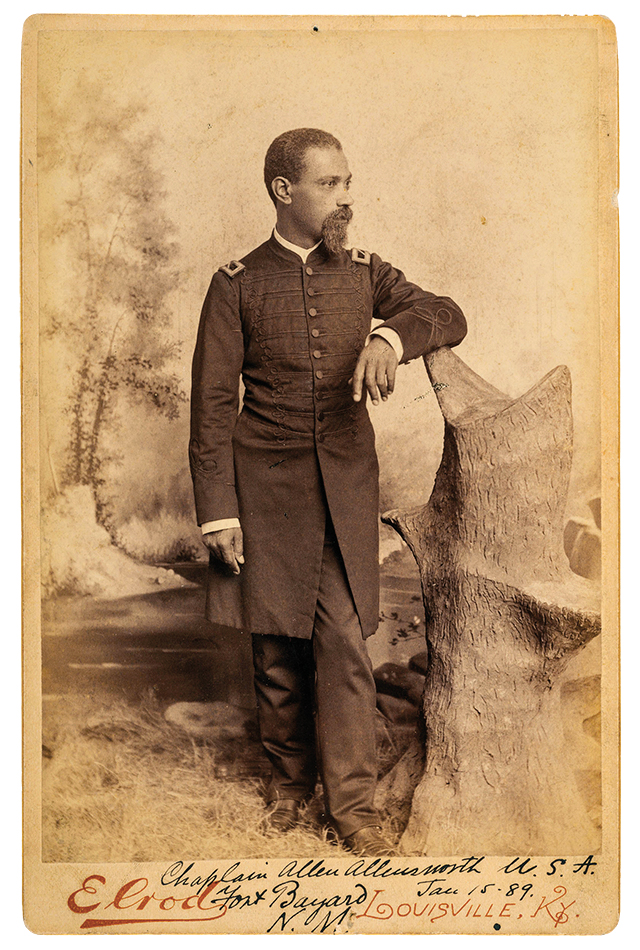
1889 photograph of Allensworth in Fort Bayard, New Mexico.

In 1886, when he was 44, Allensworth gained support by both southern and northern politicians for appointment as a chaplain in the US Army; his appointment was confirmed by the Senate, as necessary at the time, and approved by President Grover Cleveland. He was assigned to the 24th Infantry Regiment, known as the Buffalo Soldiers. He was the second Black man in the United States Army to be a commanding officer.

His family accompanied him on assignments in the West, ranging from Fort Bayard, New Mexico Territory to Fort Supply, Indian Territory, and Fort Harrison, near Helena, Montana.

Josephine Leavell, his wife, played organ in the fort chapels.

In 1887, Allensworth was featured in Men of Mark: Eminent, Progressive and Rising, an anthology of African-American biographies by William J. Simmons.

His assignment to Fort Douglas in Utah (1886–1888) was initially marked by a disparaging column in the local newspaper; near the end of his time there it published a retraction and lauded his work at the fort.

In 1889, while at Fort Bayard, Allensworth published the pamphlet Outline of Course of Study, and The Rules Governing Post Schools of Ft. Bayard, N.M., which became a military education standard.

By the time of his retirement in 1906, Allensworth had been promoted to the rank of lieutenant colonel, the second African American to have become a commanding officer and the first to have become a lieutenant colonel in the United States Army.

== Allensworth, California ==
After the army, Allensworth and his family settled in Los Angeles, California. He was inspired by the idea of establishing a self-sufficient, all-black California community where African Americans could live free of the racial discrimination that pervaded post-Reconstruction America. His dream was to build a community where black people might live and create "sentiment favorable to intellectual and industrial liberty."

By 1908, he had founded Allensworth in Tulare County, about thirty miles north of Bakersfield, in the heart of the San Joaquin Valley. The black settlers of Allensworth built homes, laid out streets, and put up public buildings. They established a church, and organized an orchestra, a glee club, and a brass band. Allensworth is the only California community to be founded, financed and governed by African Americans.

The Allensworth colony became a member of the county school district and the regional library system and a voting precinct. Residents elected the first African-American Justice of the Peace in post-Mexican California. In 1914, the California Eagle reported that the Allensworth community consisted of 900 acres (360 ha) of deeded land worth more than US$112,500.

Allensworth soon developed as a town, not just a colony. Among the social and educational organizations that flourished during its golden age were the Campfire Girls, the Owl Club, the Girls' Glee Club, and the Children's Savings Association, for the town's younger residents, while adults participated in the Sewing Circle, the Whist Club, the Debating Society, and the Theater Club. Col. Allensworth was an admirer of the African-American educator Booker T. Washington, the founding president and longtime leader of the Tuskegee Institute in Alabama. Allensworth dreamed that his new community could be self-sufficient and become known as the "Tuskegee of the West."

The Girls' Glee Club was modeled after the Jubilee Singers of Fisk University, who had toured internationally. They were the community's pride and joy. All the streets in the town were named after notable African Americans and/or white abolitionists, such as Sojourner Truth, Frederick Douglass, poet Paul Laurence Dunbar, and Harriet Beecher Stowe, abolitionist and author of Uncle Tom's Cabin. The 1915 voting registration showed "farmers, storekeepers, carpenters, nurses and more, all suggesting that the colony’s business and industrial output was prodigious."

Several events led to the town's decline. Allen, who was the leader of the town, died in an accident in 1914. Over time, the town experienced a shortage of water. The Great Depression and World War II drew people to places with greater opportunities. More people left when three of the town's wells were found to have arsenic in 1965, The town was scheduled for demolition in 1966 as a result. About 240 acres from Allensworth was used to create the California State Historic Park, Colonel Allensworth State Historic Park, which became part of the state park system in 1973. It was updated in 1985 from funding attained from historic development section of the California Parks and Recreation Facilities Act of 1984.

== Death ==
Allen Allensworth died at the age of 72, on September 14, 1914. He was hit by a motorcyclist in Monrovia, California. Colonel Allensworth was buried at Angelus-Rosedale Cemetery in Los Angeles, California.

== Legacy and honors ==
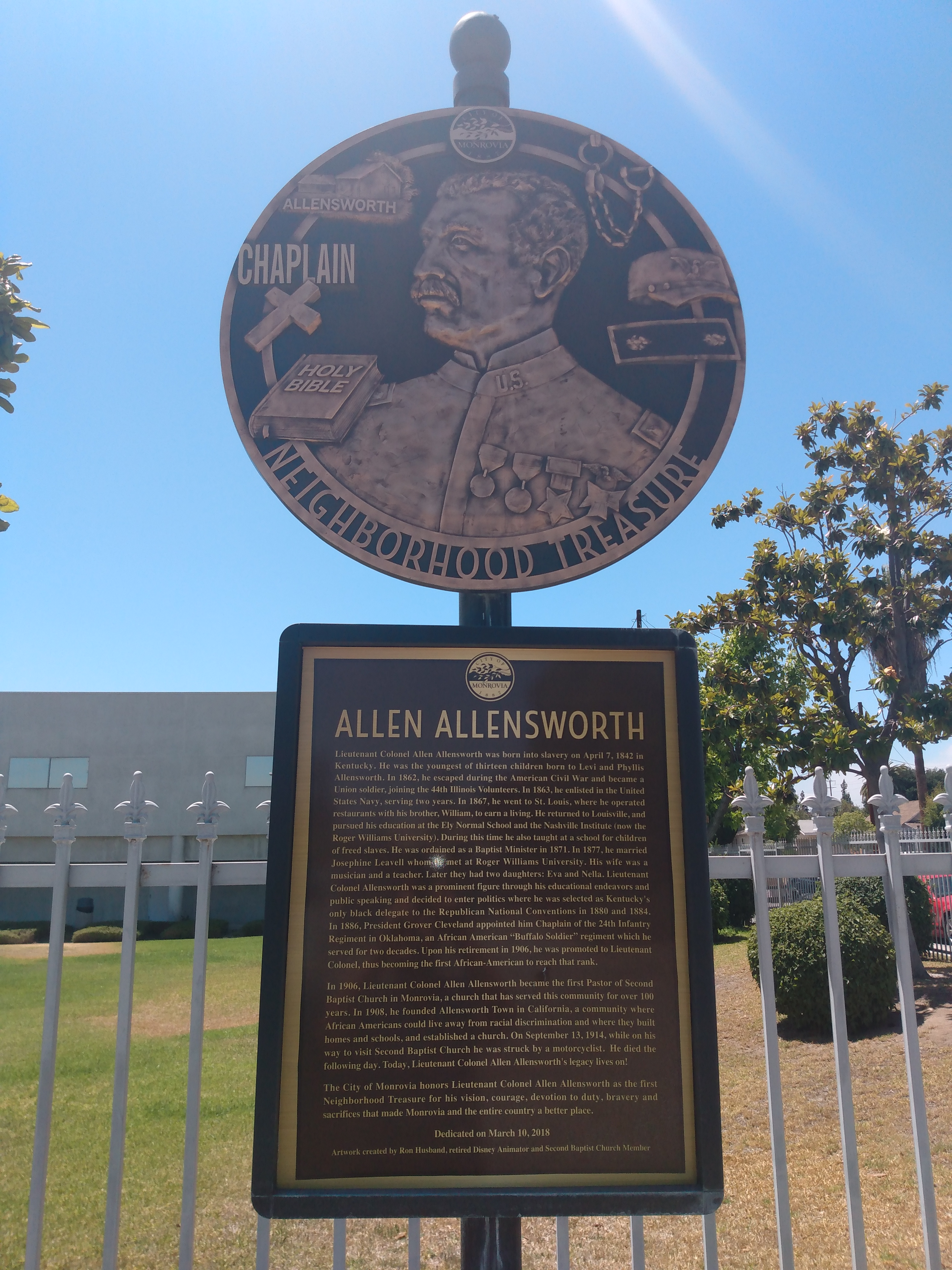
Memorial for Allen Allensworth in Monrovia, California

In 1914, Charles Alexander wrote Allensworth's biography, Battles and Victories of Allen Allensworth, A.M., Ph.D., Lieutenant-Colonel, Retired, U.S. Army.

The state has preserved the Allensworth site and is gradually restoring its buildings. The most important building is the school house, which the community prized as representing the future of its children. In use until 1972, it is furnished as it would have been on a school day in 1915. The park arranges events to celebrate the former community's history, and the park's visitor center features a film about the site. An annual re-dedication ceremony reaffirms the vision of the original pioneers.

Col. Allensworth's residence is preserved and furnished in the 1912-period style. It contains items from his life in the military service and the ministry. A small display of farm equipment is a reminder of the Allensworth economic base. A public monument, designed by Ron Husband, has been funded by the City of Monrovia, California.

== See also ==
- Poindexter & Little § Slave depot
