= Allensworth, California =

- Unincorporated community Census designated place
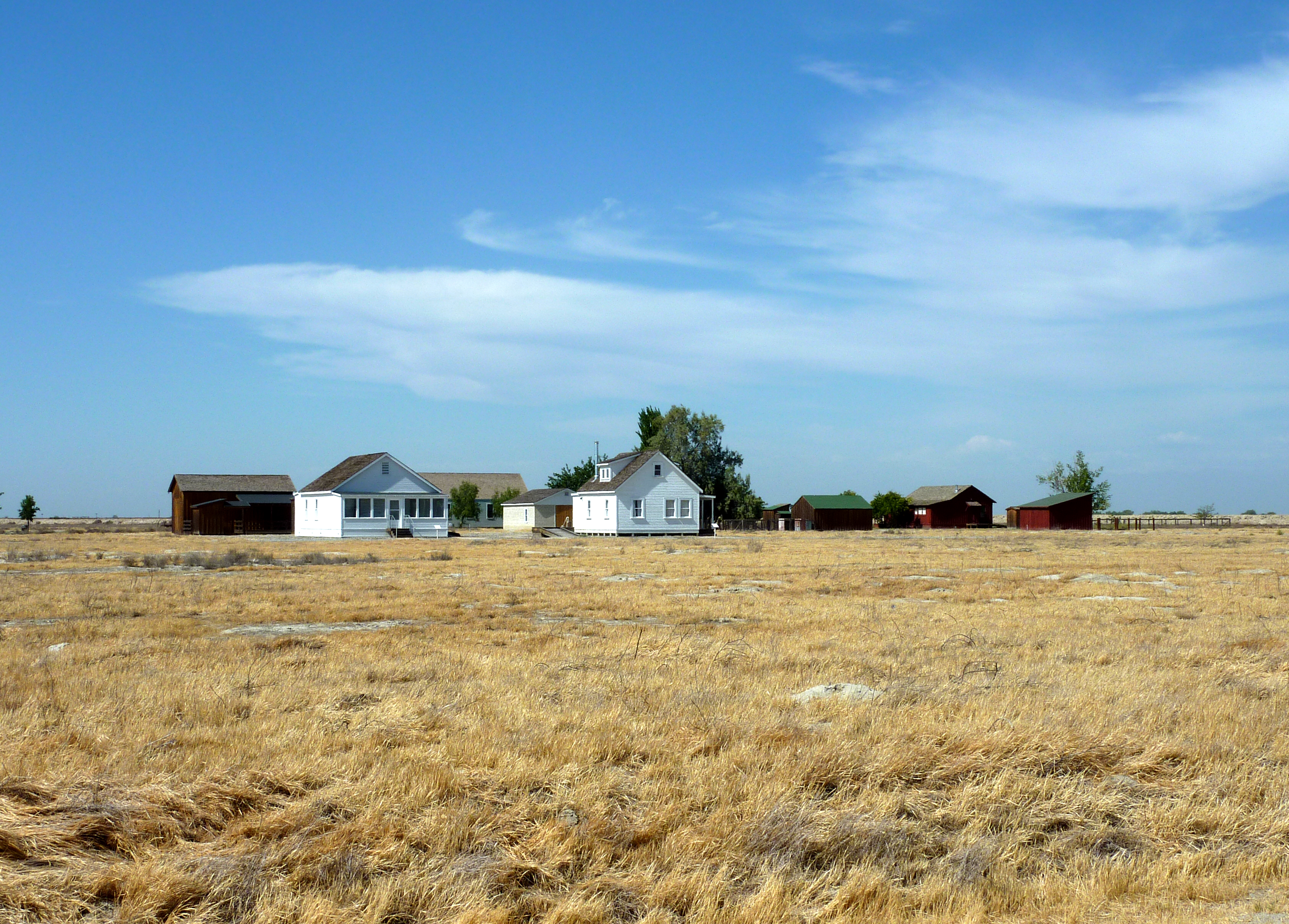
- Allensworth's restored buildings now occupy Colonel Allensworth State Historic Park.

- Location in Tulare County and the state of California

- Position in California.
- Coordinates: 35°51′00″N 119°23′21″W
- Country: United States
- State: California
- County: Tulare
- Founded: 1908
- Named for: Allen Allensworth

Area
  - Total: 3.10 sq mi (8.04 km^{2})
  - Land: 3.10 sq mi (8.04 km^{2})
  - Water: 0 sq mi (0.00 km^{2}) 0%
- Elevation: 213 ft (65 m)

Population (2020)
  - Total: 531
  - Density: 171.2/sq mi (66.09/km^{2})
- Time zone: UTC-8 (Pacific (PST))
  - Summer (DST): UTC-7 (PDT)
- ZIP code: 93219
- Area code: 661
- FIPS code: 06-01010
- GNIS feature ID: 2585402

Allensworth is an unincorporated community in Tulare County, California, United States. Established by Allen Allensworth in 1908, the town was the first in California to be founded, financed, and governed by African-Americans.

The original townsite is designated as Colonel Allensworth State Historic Park. The 2020 United States census reported Allensworth's population was 531, up from 471 at the 2010 census. For statistical purposes, the United States Census Bureau has defined Allensworth as a census-designated place (CDP).

Allensworth sits at an elevation of 213 feet (65 m), the same elevation as the huge and historically important Tulare Lake shore when it was full. The community is located in the ZIP Code 93219 and in the area code 661.

== History ==
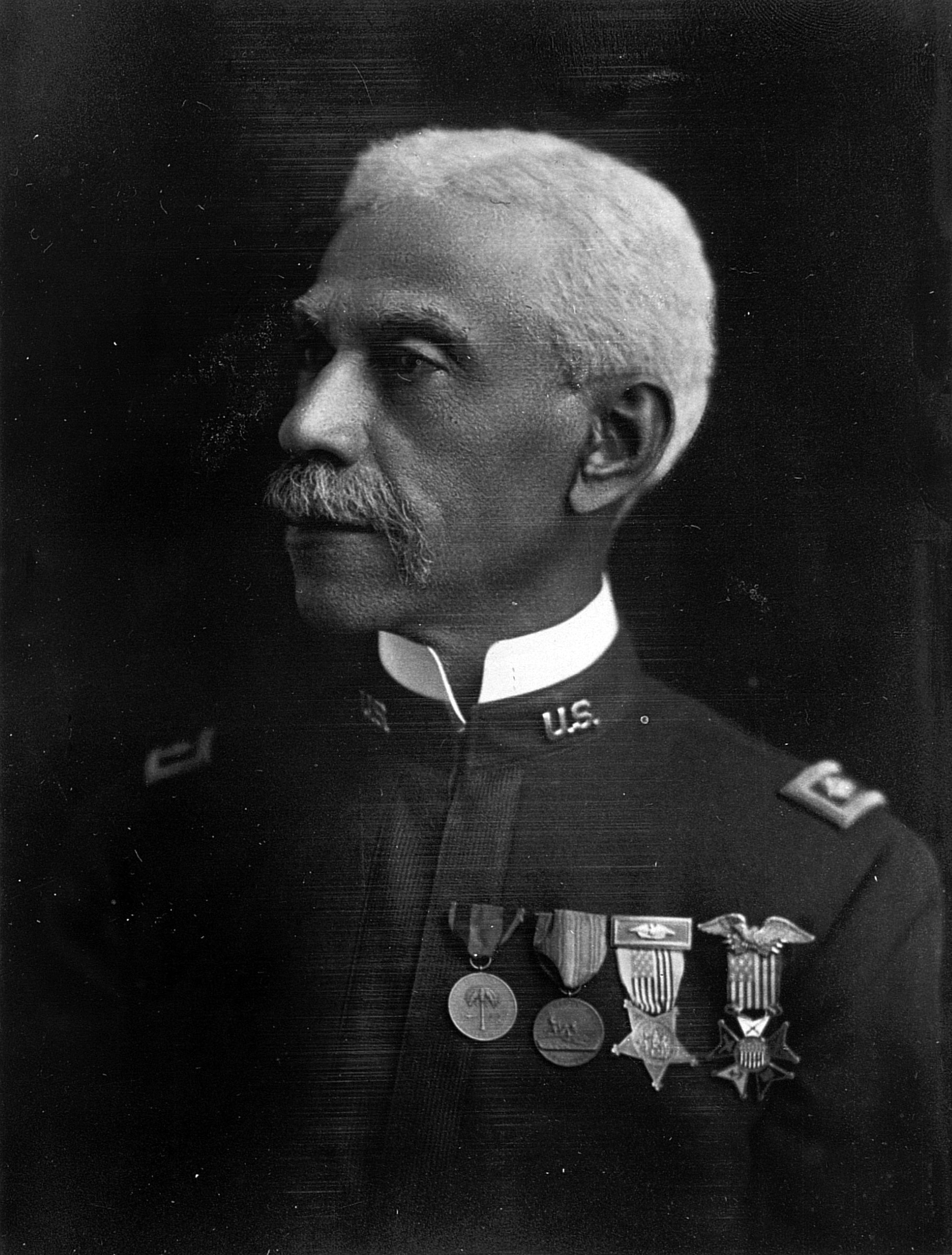
The town was named for and in part established by Col. Allen Allensworth, a chaplain of the United States Army who escaped slavery during the Civil War.

On June 30, 1908, clergyman Colonel Allen Allensworth and Denison University graduate Professor William Alexander Payne established the California Colony and Home Promoting Association. Allensworth and Payne were the chief officers, with the other constituents being miner John W. Palmer; minister William H. Peck; and real estate agent Harry A. Mitchell (all of whom were Black men). The Association purchased 20 acres of land from the Pacific Farming Company with the goal of establishing a town for Black soldiers. The land was situated at the then-extant Santa Fe rail line stop, titled "Solita." The land was divided into individual parcels, forming "a colony of orderly and industrious African Americans who could control their own destiny."

Allensworth's reputation drew many from all over the country to the town, causing some to buy property sight-unseen in order to support the efforts. In the early 20th century, the area boasted a great boom and hosted California's first African American school district by 1910.

The town was especially reported upon in 1912 to 1915, the period considered its apex as a thriving community. Its growth was reported in The New York Age, the California Eagle (which emphasized that "there is not a single white person having anything to do with the affairs of the colony") and the Los Angeles Times, which labelled Allensworth as the "ideal Negro settlement."

By 1914, the town had established a schoolhouse, thereby becoming California's first African American school district. It also had a courthouse, a Baptist church, a hotel, and a Tulare County library.

However, multiple complications occurred in 1914. The Santa Fe rail system moved its railroad stop from Allensworth to Alpaugh. In September 1914, Colonel Allensworth died in Monrovia, California, where he was struck by a motorcycle while crossing the street. The town experienced extreme losses, coupled with severe drought due to water being redirected from the town causing decreased crop yields. Despite this, the 1915 voting registration showed "farmers, storekeepers, carpenters, nurses and more, all suggesting that the colony’s business and industrial output was prodigious."

Many residents left the area following World War I.

The California Colony and Home Promoting Association's 1929 blueprint of Allensworth is available for viewership online via the California State Archives.

The town of Allensworth was scheduled for demolition in 1966 when arsenic was found in the water supply.

=== Legacy ===
The town was memorialized as a state park in 1974, and hosts seasonal events to preserve its history, which garner "thousands of visitors" from around the state. The area around the park is inhabited. In 1976, the Colonel Allensworth Historic Park was established, a process which was started by Cornelius Ed Pope. Historic buildings from 1908 to 1918 have been restored in the town center.

A number of the restored buildings are at the center of the 2022 documentary film Allensworth by James Benning. The film had its U.S. premiere at the 2022 Denver Film Festival and its European premiere at the 2023 Berlinale.

A children's historical novel Ellen of Allensworth by Janet Nichols Lynch was published in 2025, depicting life in Allensworth at the beginning of the Twentieth Century.

== Geography ==
Allensworth marks the eastern high-water shoreline of Tulare Lake, (once the largest U.S. lake outside the Great Lakes) which supported one of the largest Indian populations on the continent, herds of elk, millions of water fowl, as well as a commercial fishery and ferry service. Other townsites located on this historic shoreline include Lemoore on its northern tip, and Kettleman City on the western shore, while nearby Alpaugh is on the eastern end of a long, sandy ridge at elevation 210 ft. that was once called Hog Island. Due to diversions of the natural waterways since the mid to late 19th century, only a tiny remnant of Tulare Lake now remains. The last time Tulare Lake was full and overflowed its spillway (near Lemoore) was 1878.

Just north of Allensworth is the Pixley National Wildlife Refuge, 6,833-acre (27.65 km^{2}) grassland and wetland habitats operated by the Department of the Interior, US Fish and Wildlife Service. Of great interest, thousands of sandhill cranes (Grus canadensis), use this refuge each winter from November through March. Red-tailed hawks (Buteo jamaicensis), are among the 141 type of birds that can be seen here. Burrowing owls are sometimes present. Also present are Pacific pond turtles, once an important part of Tulare Lake's fishery trade with San Francisco.

Adjacent to the town is Allensworth Ecological Reserve. The endangered San Joaquin kit fox (Vulpes macrotis mutica) can be found in this area.

According to the United States Census Bureau, the CDP covers an area of 3.1 square miles (8.0 km^{2}), all land.

== Demographics ==
Historical population
Census	Pop.	Note	%±
2010	471		—
2020	531		12.7%
U.S. Decennial Census; 1860–1870 1880-1890; 1900 1910 1920; 1930 1940 1950; 1960 1970 1980; 1990 2000 2010

Allensworth first appeared as a census designated place in the 2010 U.S. census.

=== 2020 census ===
As of the 2020 census, Allensworth had a population of 531. The population density was 171.2 inhabitants per square mile (66.1/km^{2}). The median age was 27.8 years. The age distribution was 38.4% under the age of 18, 9.6% aged 18 to 24, 25.4% aged 25 to 44, 19.4% aged 45 to 64, and 7.2% who were 65 years of age or older. For every 100 females there were 89.6 males, and for every 100 females age 18 and over there were 98.2 males age 18 and over.

0.0% of residents lived in urban areas, while 100.0% lived in rural areas. The census reported that 100% of the population lived in households.

There were 128 households in Allensworth, of which 65.6% had children under the age of 18 living in them. Of all households, 50.8% were married-couple households, 17.2% were cohabiting couple households, 14.1% were households with a male householder and no spouse or partner present, and 18.0% were households with a female householder and no spouse or partner present. About 7.8% of all households were made up of individuals and 6.3% had someone living alone who was 65 years of age or older. The average household size was 4.15. There were 111 families (86.7% of all households).

There were 138 housing units, of which 7.2% were vacant. The homeowner vacancy rate was 0.0% and the rental vacancy rate was 8.1%. Of occupied housing units, 55.5% were owner-occupied, and 44.5% were occupied by renters.

Racial composition as of the 2020 census
Race	Number	Percent
White	98	18.5%
Black or African American	20	3.8%
American Indian and Alaska Native	6	1.1%
Asian	7	1.3%
Native Hawaiian and Other Pacific Islander	1	0.2%
Some other race	223	42.0%
Two or more races	176	33.1%
Hispanic or Latino (of any race)	494	93.0%

== Education ==
The Allensworth School District, which covers the CDP, hosts a single school serving grades K through 8. That school is named Allensworth Elementary School.

The high school district is the Delano Joint Union High School District.

== Government ==
In the California State Legislature, Allensworth is in the 16th senatorial district, represented by Democrat Melissa Hurtado, and in the 33rd Assembly district, represented by Republican Alexandra Macedo.

In the United States House of Representatives, Allensworth is in California's 22nd congressional district, represented by Republican David Valadao.
