= Madera station (California High-Speed Rail) =

Madera

General information
- Location: Avenue 12; Madera, California; United States
- Coordinates: 36.93647°N 119.98644°W
- Line: BNSF Stockton Subdivision

History
- Opening: Summer 2027 (Gold Runner); 2030 (California High-Speed Rail)

Future services
Preceding station	Amtrak	Following station
Merced toward Oakland or Sacramento	Gold Runner	Fresno toward Bakersfield
Preceding station	California High-Speed Rail	Following station
Merced Terminus	Phase 1 Initial Operating Segment	Fresno toward Bakersfield
Gilroy toward San Francisco	Phase 1	Fresno toward Anaheim
Location
- Location within California

Madera station is a proposed train station to serve Madera, California. It would be located near the intersection of Avenue 13 and Santa Fe Drive.

The Madera Amtrak station opened in 2010 as a replacement for the hundred-year old Storey station. The 2016 California High-Speed Rail Business Plan proposed a relocated Madera station in order to provide strong transit connectivity, potential for transit oriented development, good access to State Route 99 and the City of Madera, and connections between that system and Amtrak Gold Runner services. The station is being built by the San Joaquin Joint Powers Authority (instead of the California High-Speed Rail Authority, as is the case for other initial operating stations). Funding for the station was provided as part of the Valley Rail project in 2018. Work on station relocation is ongoing as of November 2019, as the San Joaquin Joint Powers Authority has entered into negotiations with CAHSR, Madera County, and the city of Madera. Gold Runner trains are expected to cease services here once high-speed operations begin. The Joint Powers Authority would receive a further $54-million federal grant via the Bipartisan Infrastructure Law in 2024.
