= Mission Rock =

Mission Rock may refer to:

- Mission Rock, San Francisco, a housing development in San Francisco, California, United States
- Mission Rock station, a light rail station on Mission Rock Street in San Francisco
- Mission Rock (Antarctica), a rock in Antarctica
