= Judah and 31st Avenue station =

Muni Metro light rail stop in San Francisco

Judah and 31st Avenue
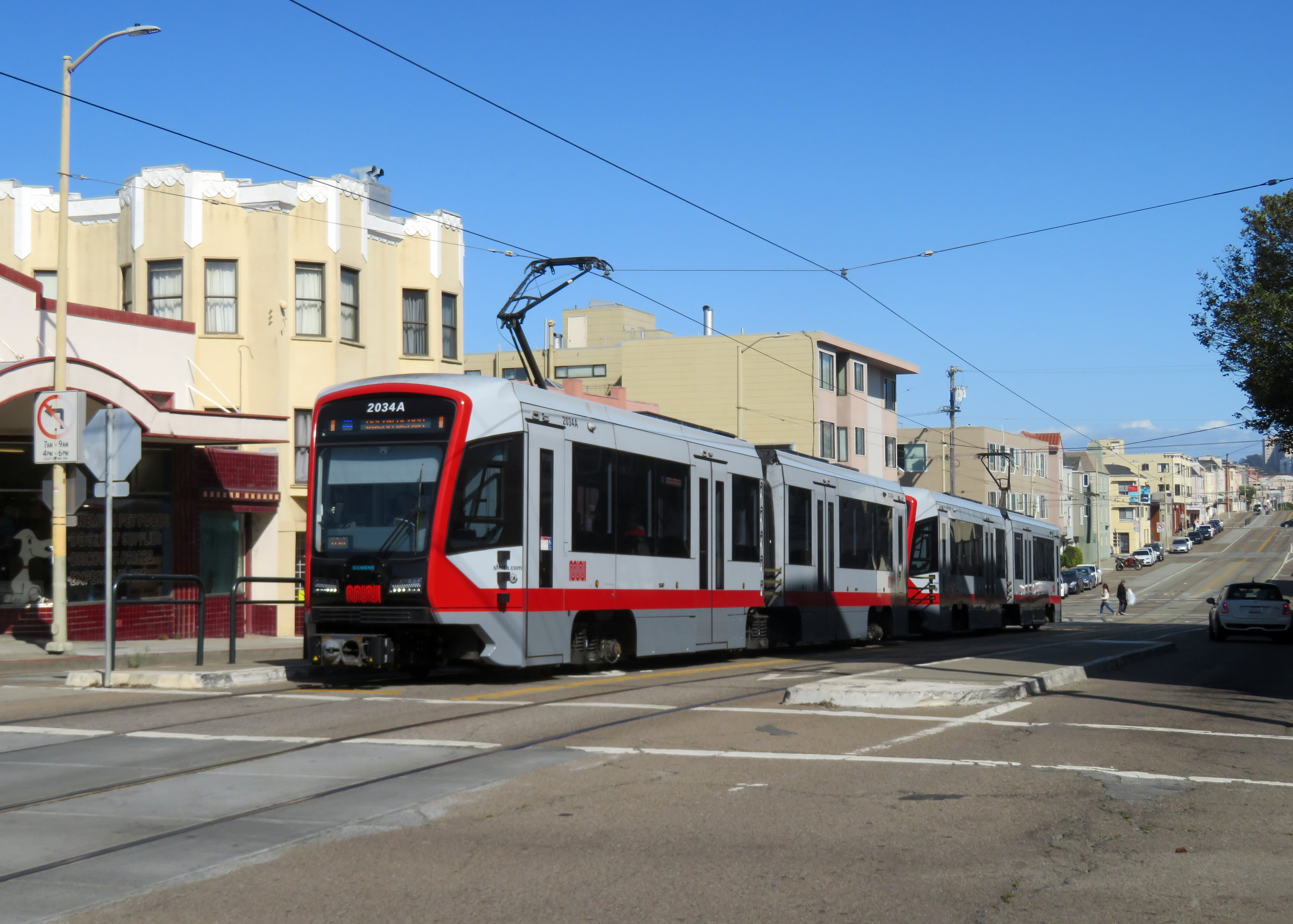
- A westbound train at Judah and 31st Avenue in September 2019

General information
- Location: Judah Street at 31st Avenue; San Francisco, California
- Coordinates: 37°45′40″N 122°29′23″W
- Platforms: 2 side platforms
- Tracks: 2
- Connections: Muni: N^{x}

Construction
- Accessible: No

History
- Opened: October 21, 1928

Services
Preceding station	Muni	Following station
Judah and 34th Avenue toward Ocean Beach	N Judah	Judah and 28th Avenue toward 4th and King
Location

Judah and 31st Avenue station is a light rail stop on the Muni Metro N Judah line, located in the Sunset District neighborhood of San Francisco, California. The station opened with the N Judah line on October 21, 1928. The station has two short side platforms in the middle of Judah Street (traffic islands) where passengers board or depart from trains. The station is not accessible to people with disabilities. A wye is located east of the station, allowing trains to short-turn.

== History ==
In March 2014, Muni released details of the proposed implementation of their Transit Effectiveness Project (later rebranded MuniForward), which included a variety of stop changes for the N Judah line. Under that plan – which will be implemented as the N Judah Rapid Project – the stop will have its short boarding islands extended to accommodate longer trains, and the inbound platform will be moved to west of 31st Avenue.

== Bus service ==
The stop is also served by the N^{x} bus, a weekday peak hours service that provides express service from the east end of the N Judah line to the Financial District, plus the N Bus and N Owl bus routes, which provide service along the N Judah line during the early morning and late night hours respectively when trains do not operate.
