= Folsom station (Muni Metro) =

Muni Metro light rail station in San Francisco

Folsom & The Embarcadero
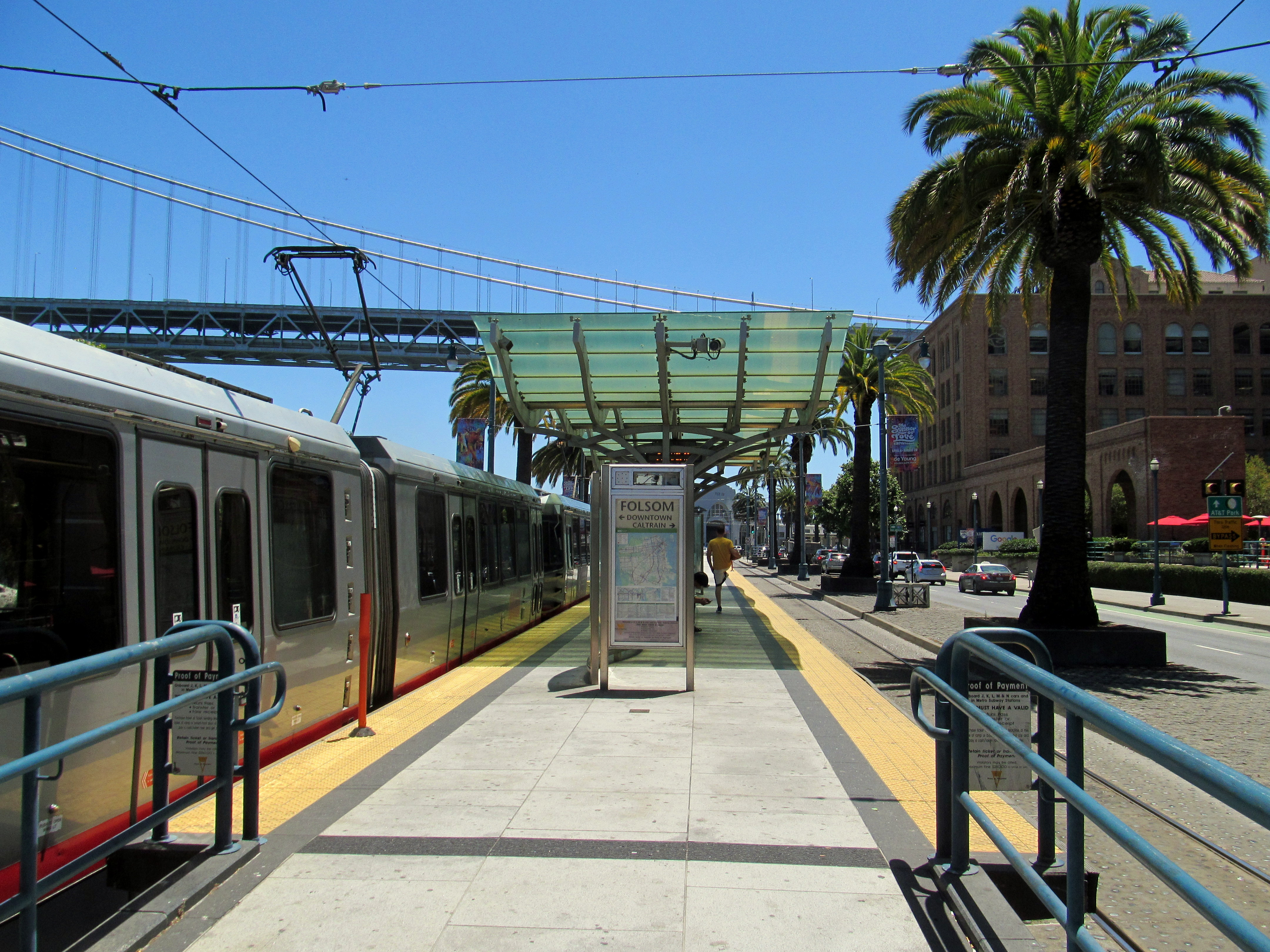
- Muni Metro train at Folsom & The Embarcadero station in July 2017

General information
- Location: The Embarcadero at Folsom Street; San Francisco, California
- Coordinates: 37°47′26″N 122°23′22″W
- Line: Muni Metro Extension
- Platforms: 1 high level island platform 2 low level side platforms
- Tracks: 2

Construction
- Accessible: Yes

History
- Opened: January 10, 1998

Services
Preceding station	Muni	Following station
Embarcadero toward Ocean Beach	N Judah	Brannan toward 4th and King
Former services
Preceding station	Muni	Following station
Ferry Building toward Jones and Beach	E Embarcadero	Brannan toward 4th and King
Embarcadero toward West Portal	T Third Street	Brannan toward Sunnydale
Location

Folsom station (signed as Folsom & The Embarcadero) is a Muni Metro light rail station located in the median of The Embarcadero between Folsom Street and Harrison Street in the Rincon Hill area of San Francisco, California.

The station was built with both a high-level island platform for Muni Metro trains, and a pair of low-level side platforms at the south end of the station next to the Harrison Street grade crossing for historic streetcars, which are not in use as of 2026.

== History ==
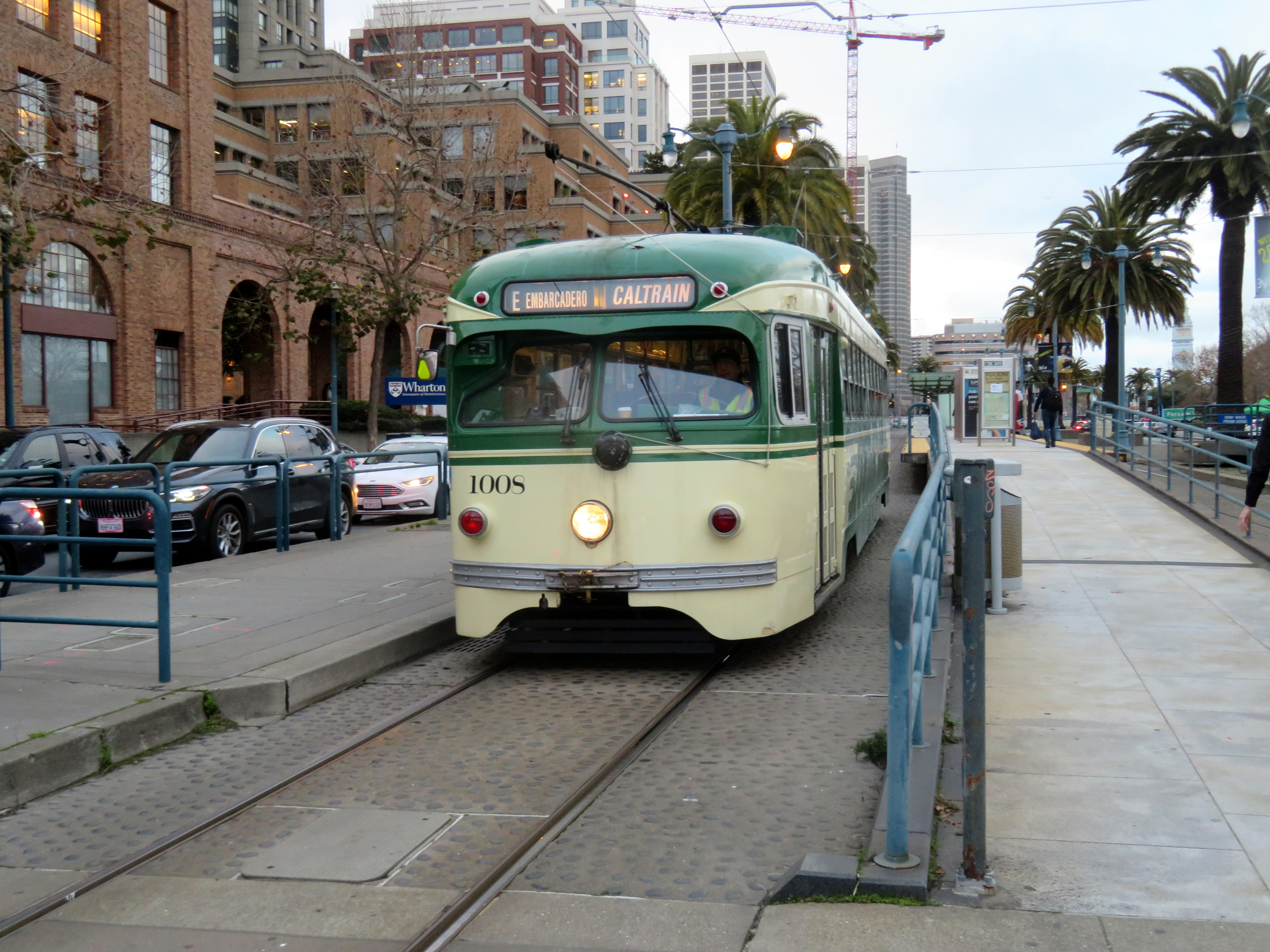
E Embarcadero streetcar at the station

The station opened on January 10, 1998, as part of the Muni Metro Extension project. It was initially served by a temporary E Embarcadero line between Embarcadero station and 4th and King/Caltrain station. N Judah service replaced the shuttle service on August 22, 1998. T Third Street service began on April 7, 2007; N Judah service was initially cut back to Embarcadero station, with J Church service added at peak hours. On June 30, 2007, the J and N were restored to their previous configuration. E Embarcadero heritage streetcar service was added on August 1, 2015, but ended in 2020 due to the COVID-19 pandemic.

The station is served by the N Bus and N Owl bus routes, which provide service along the N Judah line during the early morning and late night hours respectively when trains do not operate.
