= Brannan station =

Muni Metro light rail station in San Francisco

Brannan & The Embarcadero
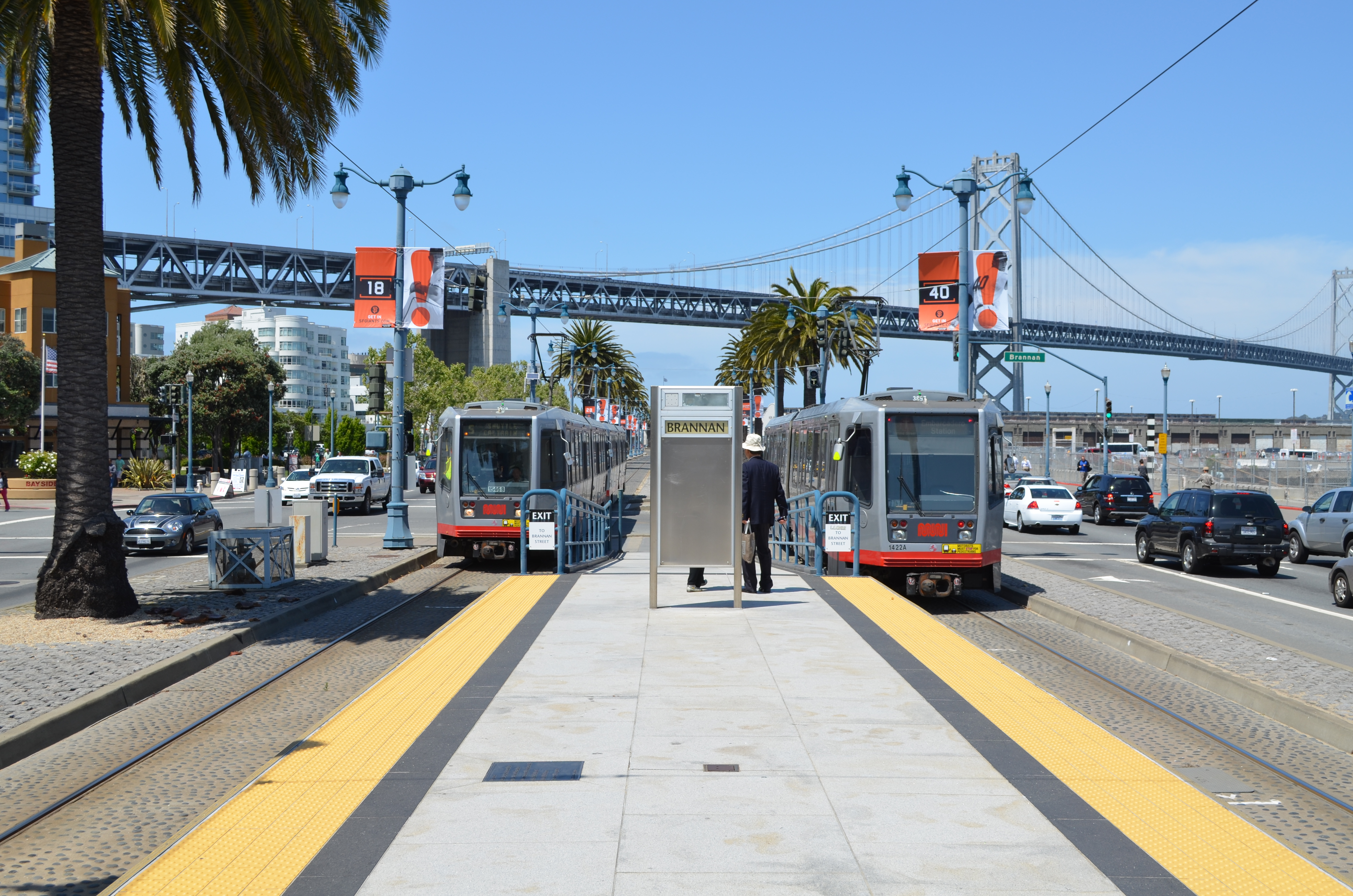
- Muni Metro trains at Brannan & The Embarcadero station in May 2012

General information
- Location: The Embarcadero at Brannan Street; San Francisco, California
- Coordinates: 37°47′3.72″N 122°23′17.33″W
- Line: Muni Metro Extension
- Platforms: 1 high level island platform 2 low level side platforms
- Tracks: 2

Construction
- Accessible: Yes

History
- Opened: January 10, 1998

Services
Preceding station	Muni	Following station
Folsom toward Ocean Beach	N Judah	2nd and King toward 4th and King
Former services
Preceding station	Muni	Following station
Folsom toward Jones and Beach	E Embarcadero	2nd and King toward 4th and King
Folsom toward West Portal	T Third Street	2nd and King toward Sunnydale
Location

Brannan station (signed as Brannan & The Embarcadero) is a Muni Metro light rail station located in the median of The Embarcadero south of Brannan Street in the South Beach area of San Francisco, California.

The station was built with both a high-level island platform for Muni Metro trains, and a pair of low-level side platforms at the south end of the station for historic streetcars, which are not in use as of 2026.

== History ==
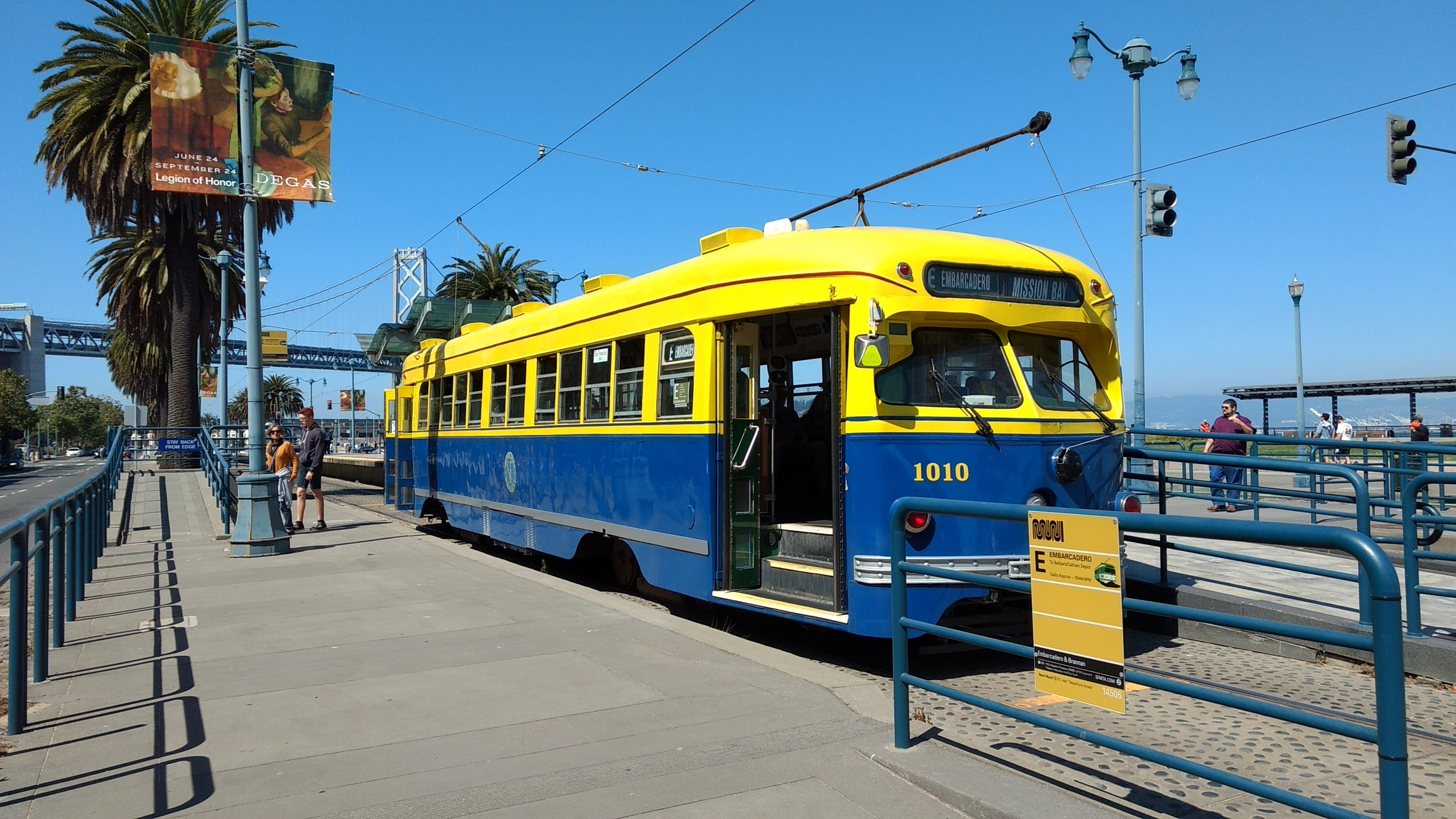
An E Embarcadero streetcar at the station in 2017

The station opened on January 10, 1998, as part of the Muni Metro Extension project. It was initially served by a temporary E Embarcadero line between Embarcadero station and 4th and King/Caltrain station. N Judah service replaced the shuttle service on August 22, 1998. T Third Street service began on April 7, 2007; N Judah service was initially cut back to Embarcadero station, with J Church service added at peak hours. On June 30, 2007, the J and N were restored to their previous configuration. E Embarcadero heritage streetcar service was added on August 1, 2015, but ended in 2020 due to the COVID-19 pandemic.

T Third Street service was rerouted off The Embarcadero and into the Central Subway on January 7, 2023.

The station is served by the N Bus and N Owl bus routes, which provide service along the N Judah line during the early morning and late night hours respectively when trains do not operate.
