= Fresno station (California High-Speed Rail) =

Railway station in Fresno, California, U.S.

Fresno
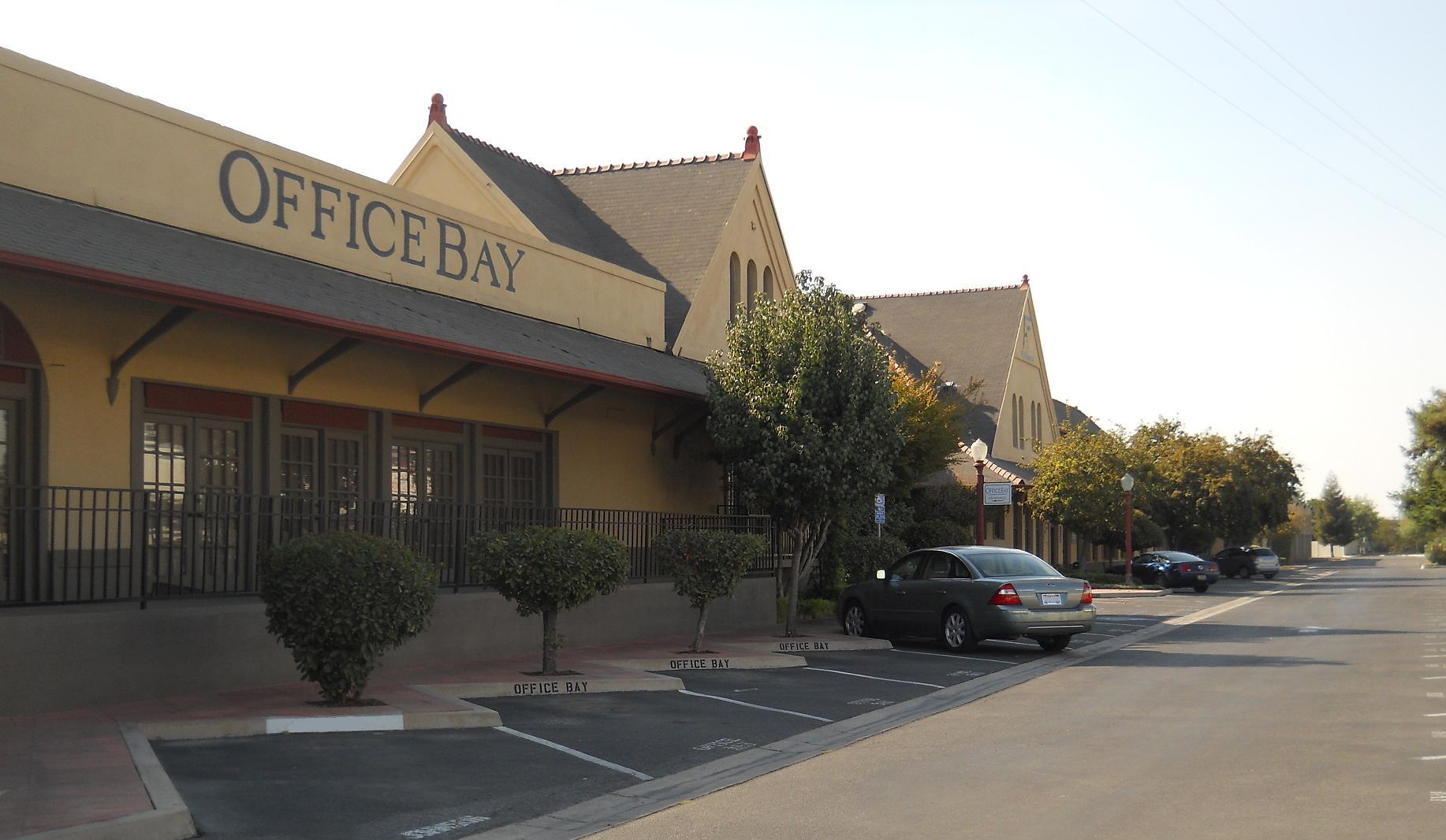
- The Depot as seen from Tulare Street, 2014

General information
- Location: H Street; Fresno, California
- Coordinates: 36.733074°N 119.793732°W
- Owner: California High-Speed Rail Authority

Other information
- Status: under construction

History
- Opened: May 28, 1872
- Opening: 2030 (California High-Speed Rail)
- Closed: April 1, 1971
- Rebuilt: October 1889
- Original company: Central Pacific Railroad

Future services
Preceding station	California High-Speed Rail	Following station
Madera toward Merced	Phase 1 Initial Operating Segment	Kings–Tulare toward Bakersfield

Former services
Preceding station	Southern Pacific Railroad	Following station
Madera toward Oakland Pier	San Joaquin Valley Line	Malaga toward Los Angeles
Kerman toward Oakland Pier	San Joaquin Valley Line via; West Side	Malaga toward Los Angeles
Terminus	Exeter Branch	Sanger toward Porterville
Terminus	Clovis Branch	Barton toward Friant
Madera toward Sacramento	Sacramento Daylight	Tulare toward Los Angeles
Madera toward Oakland Pier	San Joaquin Daylight	Tulare toward Los Angeles
- Southern Pacific Depot
- U.S. National Register of Historic Places
- Location within California Location within the United States
- Coordinates: 36°43′57″N 119°47′33″W
- Area: 1 acre (0.40 ha)
- Built: 1889
- Built by: Southern Pacific
- Architectural style: Queen Anne style
- NRHP reference No.: 78000665
- Added to NRHP: March 21, 1978
Location
- Location within California

Fresno is a California High-Speed Rail station being constructed in Fresno, California. The first purpose-built high speed rail station in the United States, it is part of the system's Initial Construction Segment. The facility is located in Downtown Fresno at H Street between Fresno and Tulare Streets, and is being built as an expansion of the adjacent historic Fresno Southern Pacific Depot. It is one block from the former Fulton Street Mall.

The station is about 7 blocks south from the existing Fresno Amtrak station. The high-speed rail line runs along the right-of-way of the Union Pacific Railroad at this location.

== History ==
=== Southern Pacific Railroad ===
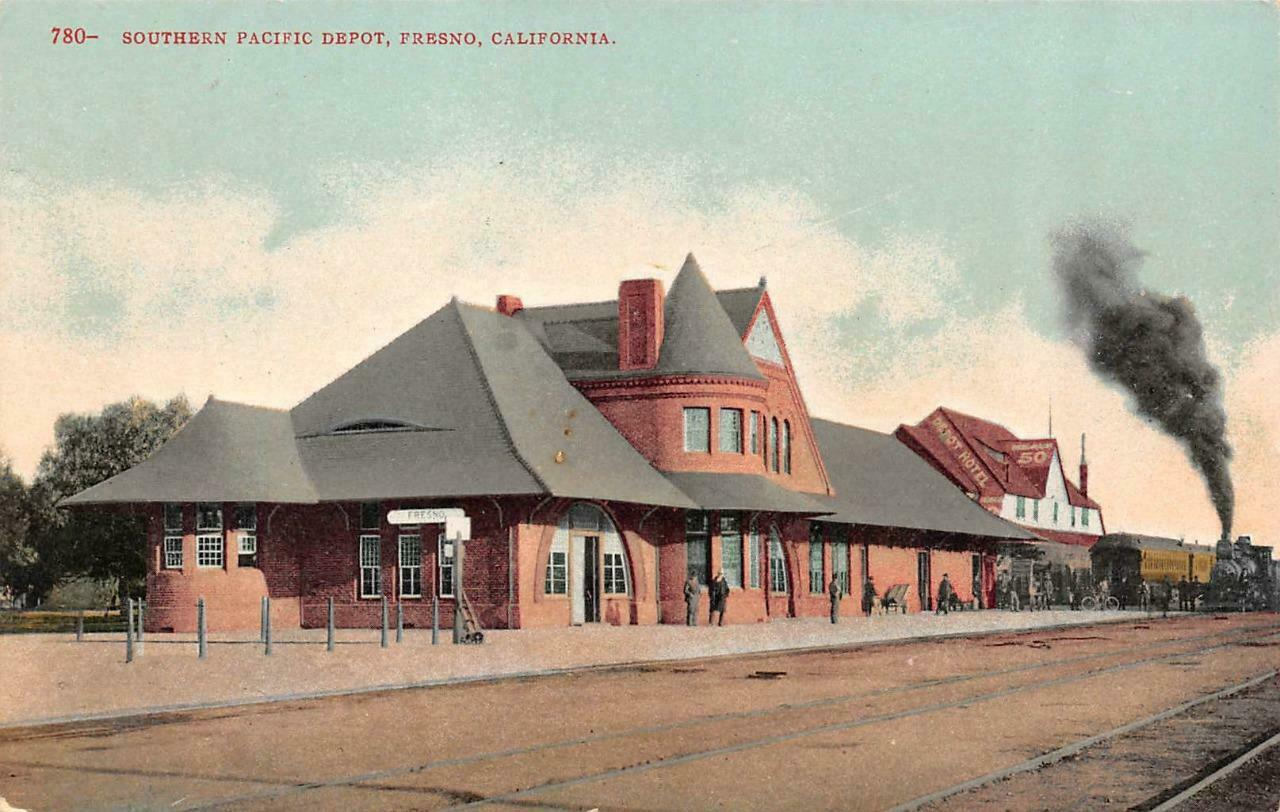
Southern Pacific Fresno Station c. 1915

This was the site of the first station established in Fresno. The Central Pacific Railroad began service here on May 28, 1872. The railroad built a simple wood frame depot.

By 1888 the station had come under the ownership of Southern Pacific (SP), who wished to expand the facility. The City of Fresno rejected initial plans for a new station building, forcing SP to redesign and submit a new blueprint in the Queen Anne style of architecture, one of two such stations in California. The new Depot opened in October 1889 and consolidated much of the company's freight operations in the Valley.

Expansions and remodels occurred in the 1900s: more freight space was added on the south side of the building some time between 1914 and 1929, offices were built on the north side in 1930, and the waiting room was remodeled in 1945. The Depot hosted named trains such as the Sacramento Daylight and San Joaquin Daylight.

The station was closed on May 1, 1971, as Amtrak assumed most intercity rail operations in the United States and the Central Valley was left out of the initial system. When services were resumed in Fresno in 1974, they used the Santa Fe Passenger Depot on the Atchison, Topeka and Santa Fe Railway line, about 3/4 mile (1.2 km) to the northeast.

The station was added to the National Register of Historic Places on March 21, 1978. It is additionally listed on the City of Fresno Local Register of Historic Resources.

=== California High-Speed Rail ===
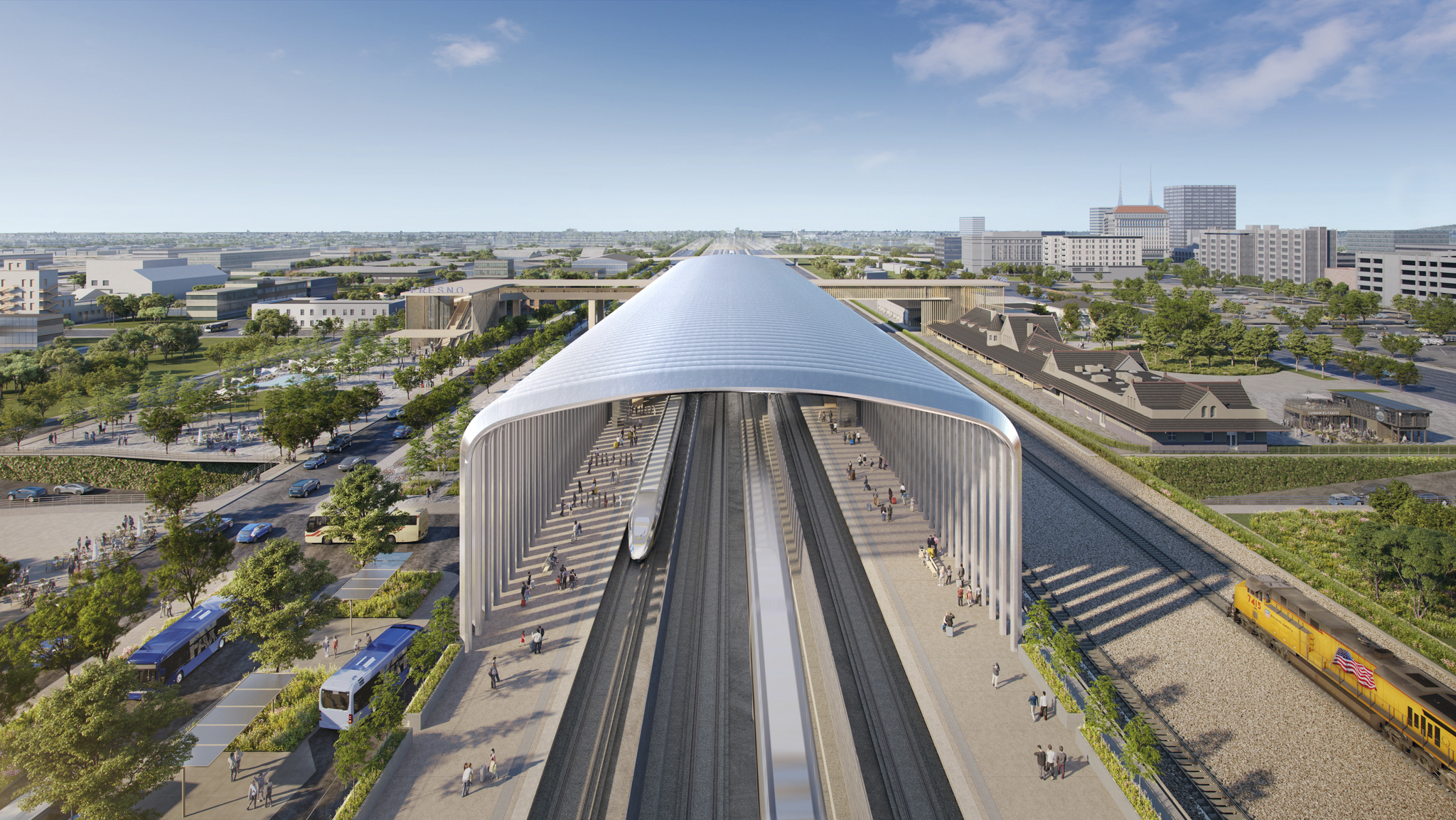
Rendering of the planned Fresno HSR station; the old station building is on the right

The groundbreaking ceremony for the California High-Speed Rail system was held at the station site on January 6, 2015. In July 2015, it was estimated that construction of the station building itself would commence in 2017 or 2018 and was expected to spur new development in Downtown Fresno. In October 2016, the plans called for the station to occupy about 120,000 square feet and cost about $80 million, with the planning work being finished by the end of 2019.

Several existing industrial and office buildings in the vicinity had to be demolished to make way for the station and tracks. At the end of January 2017, demolition was begun on a former Greyhound bus terminal dating from the 1950s that occupied the site of the future high-speed rail station.

In June 2023, the CHSRA received a $20 million federal grant for restoration of the station building and construction of a plaza. The $33.2 million project budget also includes $11.2 million in CHSRA funds.
