= Route of California High-Speed Rail =

Route of the California High-Speed Rail system

CAHSR route as of Feb. 2021. Click to enlarge.

The California High-Speed Rail system will be built in two major phases. Phase 1, about 520 miles (840 km) long using high-speed rail through the Central Valley, will connect San Francisco to Los Angeles. In Phase 2, the route will be extended in the Central Valley north to Sacramento, and from east through the Inland Empire and then south to San Diego. The total system length will be about 800 miles (1,300 km) long. Phase 2 currently has no timeline for completion.

The Interim Initial Operating Segment currently under construction will connect the downtowns of Merced and Bakersfield. Its completion date is estimated to be between 2030 and 2033.

The route of Phase 1 has been selected, however, the route for Phase 2 has not been finalized.

== Background ==
CAHSR route showing population density.

On August 13, 2008, California Assembly Bill 3034 (AB 3034) was approved by the state legislature and signed by Governor Arnold Schwarzenegger on August 26, 2008. The bill was submitted to California voters in the November 2008 election as Proposition 1A and approved. With the voter's mandate, certain route and travel time requirements were established. Among these were that the route must link downtown San Francisco with Los Angeles and Anaheim, and must link the state's major population centers together, "including Sacramento, the San Francisco Bay Area, the Central Valley, [the] Los Angeles Basin, the Inland Empire, Orange County, and San Diego." The first phase of the project must link San Francisco with Los Angeles and Anaheim. Up to 24 stations were authorized for the completed system.

Some people were concerned with the Central Valley route going down the east side of the Valley rather than the more open west side. Citizens for California High-Speed Rail Accountability note: "Environmental lawsuits against the California High-Speed Rail Authority often claim inadequate consideration of running the track next to Interstate 5 in the Central Valley or next to Interstate 580 over the Altamont Pass." However, the intent of Proposition 1A was clear in connecting the major population centers together as the current route does.

The Authority knew from the outset that it did not have enough funding to do the entire system, so it investigated ways to implement the system in stages. There were two basic options for the Initial Operating Section (IOS): extend the San Joaquin Valley segment, where construction had started, northward toward the San Francisco Bay Area (the IOS-North option, San Francisco to Bakersfield), or southward to Southern California (the IOS-South option, Merced to San Fernando Valley). In the 2012 and 2014 Business Plans the goal was to implement the IOS-South, but a 2016 analysis of the funding available and time necessary to completion lead the Authority to propose the IOS-North be implemented instead. The proposal, named the Silicon Valley to Central Valley Line, was expected to have sufficient funding available to bring this segment online by 2031. The rail authority stated its commitment to pursue additional funding to complete the Phase 1 system by 2033. The current 2022 Business Plan does not commit to the 2033 date.

== California State Rail Modernization ==
CAHSR connections to commuter rail systems. Click to enlarge.

The California Department of Transportation's California State Rail Modernization Plan (2023 Draft) integrates the High-Speed Rail system into its long-range passenger rail plan.

The map to the right shows how the HSR system will provide connections to long distance (Amtrak) as well as commuter rail services at the north and south ends of the HSR system.

The Interim Initial Operating Segment runs in the Central Valley from Merced (north end) to Bakersfield (south end).

== Initial Operating Segment ==
CAHSR phased implementation plan as of March 2023. Note the Initial Operating Segment (IOS) runs from Merced to Bakersfield, which is the Yellow line. Phase II (Sacramento extension and San Diego extension) are not featured on this map. Click to enlarge.

The 2022 Business Plan focuses on developing an Interim Initial Operating Segment (IOS) between Merced and Bakersfield. This IOS will have 5 stations: Merced, Madera, Fresno, Kings/Tulare, and Bakersfield.

The route to San Francisco from the Central Valley has been selected, however funding to initiate construction from Merced to San Jose is not yet available.

== San Francisco to Central Valley route selection ==
Although the Authority is focused on getting the Interim IOS in the Central Valley in operation by the end of the decade, it is also looking ahead to the next step (that is, connecting to San Francisco using the prepared Caltrain blended route). On April 28, 2022 it approved the final route in the San Jose to Merced section. This alignment (Alternative 4) uses the existing Union Pacific Railroad (UPRR) alignment from San Jose to Gilroy as a blended section.

East of Gilroy the alignment becomes a pure HSR section with approximately 15 miles (24 km) of tunnels through the Pacheco Pass. Trains will be able to travel at 220 mph (350 km/h) even through the tunnels. When tunnel field studies, early engineering, and design work are completed for this section, it will be ready for construction when funding is available. Tunnel construction is anticipated to take up to 6 years to complete once begun.

== Phase 1 route details ==
External images
- San Francisco to San Jose Section map (July 2018)
- San Jose to Merced Section map (April 2022)
- Central Valley Wye Section map (September 2020)
- Merced to Fresno Section map (September 2020)
- Fresno to Bakersfield Section map (December 2019)
- Bakersfield to Palmdale Section map (December 2021)
- Palmdale to Burbank Section map (DRAFT, October 2020) Factsheet (August 2020)
- Burbank to Los Angeles Section map (June 2020)
- Los Angeles to Anaheim Section map (May 2022)

The list of maps to the right indicate the preferred routes in all Phase 1 sections except where 'DRAFT' is indicated. All Initial Operating Segment sections are indicated by '(IOS)' in the subsection headings below.

=== San Francisco to San Jose ===
The 49 miles (79 km) bookend from San Francisco to San Jose used by Caltrain was electrified on September 21, 2024. The existing Caltrain track can only support maximum train speeds of 79 miles per hour (127 km/h) due to track curves, so since the HSR trains will be sharing track, in places the track will need to be redone in order to support the HSR 110 miles per hour (180 km/h) speeds. Both the high-speed trains and the new Caltrain EMUs will be able to run at 110 mph (180 km/h) on shared tracks from San Jose north. Service is planned to be extended to the Salesforce Transit Center once the Downtown Rail Extension (now known as The Portal) is completed. Non-stop HSR design speed for this segment is about 29 minutes.

The one-way fare between San Francisco and San Jose is expected to cost $22 in 2013 dollars.

The Authority recognizes the value of adding this link as soon as possible to the Initial Operating Segment (IOS), and is exploring ways of obtaining additional funding for it.

=== San Jose to Merced / the Diablo Range crossing ===
South of San Jose, CHSR will continue to share the Union Pacific right-of-way until it reaches Gilroy, when it will switch onto dedicated HSR tracks for the remainder of the route to Merced. The San Jose-Merced section is 125 miles (201 km) in total.

One issue initially debated was the crossing of the Diablo Range via either the Altamont Pass or the Pacheco Pass to link the Bay Area to the Central Valley. On November 15, 2007, Authority staff recommended that the High-Speed Rail follow the Pacheco Pass route because it is more direct and serves both San Jose and San Francisco on the same route, while the Altamont route poses several major engineering obstacles, including crossing San Francisco Bay. Some cities along the Altamont route, such as Pleasanton and Fremont, opposed the Altamont route option, citing concerns over possible property taking and increase in traffic congestion. However, environmental groups, including the Sierra Club, opposed the Pacheco route because the area is less developed and more environmentally sensitive than Altamont.

The Pacheco Pass alignment going through the Grasslands Ecological Area has been criticized by two environmental groups, The Sierra Club and the Natural Resources Defense Council. A coalition that includes the cities of Menlo Park, Atherton, and Palo Alto has also sued the Authority to reconsider the Altamont Pass alternative. More than one hundred land owners along the proposed route rejected initial offers by the Authority, and the Authority has taken them to court, seeking to take their land through eminent domain. The possibility of urban sprawl into communities along the route have been raised by farming industry leaders.

On December 19, 2007, the Authority Board of Directors agreed to proceed with the Pacheco Pass option. Pacheco Pass was considered the superior route for long-distance travel between Southern California and the Bay Area, although the Altamont Pass option would serve as a good commuter route. The Authority plans conventional rail upgrades for the Altamont corridor, to complement the high-speed project.

This segment will also cross the Calaveras Fault.

On April 28, 2022 the Authority approved the final route in the San Jose to Merced section. This alignment (Alternative 4) uses the existing UPRR alignment from San Jose to Gilroy. (The section's alternatives are discussed in the San Jose to Merced Project Section, Final Environmental Impact Report/ Environmental Impact Statement, Executive Summary, February 2022.

East of Gilroy the alignment becomes a pure HSR route with approximately 15 miles (24 km) of tunnels through the Pacheco Pass. When tunnel field studies, early engineering, and design work are completed for this section, it will be ready for construction when funding is available.

=== Chowchilla Wye ===
The Chowchilla Wye, or Central Valley Wye, is a planned high-speed rail flying wye junction to be located south of Chowchilla in the Central Valley of California. California High-Speed Rail trains will use the structure to switch between the three branches of the Phase I system: westward towards the San Francisco Peninsula, southward towards Bakersfield (and later southern California), and northwards towards Merced (where passengers may transfer to other rail services until the line is extended to Sacramento). The north–south leg is planned to become operational with the Central Valley Segment opening in 2029, with the full facility coming online when the Peninsula line begins operations.

A study in 2013 identified 14 potential alignments for the Wye, referred to by the closest roads to be paralleled. These were pared down to four options by 2017. In 2019 the California High-Speed Rail Authority selected the final alignment: the State Route 152 / Road 11 option. The board approved that alignment in September 2020.

=== Merced to Fresno ===
The entire 60-mile (97 km) segment from Merced to Fresno in the Central Valley will run on dedicated HSR tracks. This segment also includes the Chowchilla Wye. The southern portion of this segment (north of Madera to Fresno) has received route approval and is undergoing construction.

The Madera station (unlike the other 4 IOS stations) is going to be designed through local means.

=== Fresno to Bakersfield ===
This segment includes stations at Fresno, Kings–Tulare, and Bakersfield, as well as crossings of the Kings River, Cross Creek, and the Kern River.

The 114-mile (183 km) segment in the Central Valley will run on dedicated HSR tracks for the Initial Operating Section in 2029. As of 7 May 2014, the route for this segment has been chosen and approved by the California High-Speed Rail Authority. Final route approval was obtained by the Federal Railroad Administration and the federal Surface Transportation Board in August 2014. The segment is currently under construction. Due to disputes with the cities of Shafter and Bakersfield, the segment under construction currently ends north of Shafter until final routes through Shafter and northern Bakersfield are negotiated with those cities.

=== Bakersfield to Palmdale / the Tehachapi Mountains crossing ===
The 79 miles (127 km) from Bakersfield to Palmdale crosses the Tehachapi Pass. Non-stop design speed for this segment is 23 minutes.

The low point on Tehachapi Pass is 4,031 feet (1,229 m). This is significantly higher than Pacheco Pass at 1,368 feet (417 m) over the Diablo Range, and so this is a more formidable engineering challenge. For comparison, the route over Pacheco Pass begins in Chowchilla (elevation 240 feet (73 m)), crosses the valley floor and climbs to the pass (elevation 1,368 feet (417 m)), and descends to Gilroy (elevation 200 feet (61 m)). The route over the Tehachapi Pass begins in Bakersfield (elevation 404 feet (123 m)), crosses the valley floor and climbs over steeper mountains to the pass (elevation 4,031 feet (1,229 m)), then descends to Palmdale (elevation 2,657 feet (810 m)).

Community meetings to solicit stakeholder concerns were held around the end of 2015.

In August 2021, the Authority approved the Bakersfield to Palmdale alignment. The alignment includes nine tunnels over a length of more than 10 miles (16 km), and it requires 15 miles (24 km) of aerial structures.

=== Palmdale to Burbank / the San Gabriel Mountains crossing ===
The segment from Palmdale to Burbank is a distance of 38 miles (61 km). This segment will cross the San Gabriel Mountains. Non-stop design speed for this segment is 13 minutes.

On September 2, 2022 the California High-Speed Rail Authority issued the Draft Environmental Impact Report/Environmental Impact Statement for the section. The preferred alternative, designated as SR14A, will contain four tunnels that cover a distance of 28 mi (45 km).

On June 27th, 2024, the Final Environmental Impact Report/Environmental Impact Statement (EIR/EIS) for the Palmdale to Burbank segment was approved by the California High-Speed Rail Authority Board of Directors.

=== Burbank to Los Angeles ===
The segment from Burbank to Los Angeles (LA Union Station) is 14 miles (23 km). Non-stop design speed for this segment is about 7 minutes.

The one-way fare between Burbank and Los Angeles is expected to cost $26 in 2013 dollars.

The Burbank to Los Angeles route was approved in January 2022.

=== Los Angeles to Anaheim ===
The 33 miles (53 km) from Los Angeles to Anaheim will run on an upgraded Metrolink corridor for Phase 1 Blended in 2033. Non-stop design speed for this segment is 46 minutes. In 2023, CAHSR proposed upgrading the railway between Los Angeles and Fullerton from the existing three mainline tracks to four tracks. Two tracks would be dedicated to freight, while the other two tracks would be dedicated for passenger rail (although freight trains would still be able to use the two passenger tracks). In the four-track section, two of the tracks would be electrified. Two mainline tracks would be available between Fullerton and Anaheim. The proposal to upgrade the BNSF-owned right-of-way brought the estimated overall cost of the Los Angeles-Anaheim segment down to between US$6.46 and US$6.72 billion, a reduction from US$8.97 billion for the previous plan that involved building a freight holding area to house trains not currently in use.

The one-way fare between Los Angeles and Anaheim is expected to cost $29 in 2013 dollars.

== Phase 1 stations & transit system connections ==
All stations in this table represent proposed HSR service. Station names in italics are optional stations that may not be constructed. In most cases existing stations will be re-purposed for high-speed rail service, with the exception of completely new stations at Merced, Fresno, Kings–Tulare, and Bakersfield.

Station; link to see latest information	Location	Status	Completion	Connecting rail services	Connecting bus services	Notes
Salesforce Transit Center (rail connection awaiting completion of the Downtown Rail Extension, now known as The Portal)	San Francisco	Existing, train station and connecting tunnel unfunded	postponed	Caltrain	AC Transit, Amtrak Thruway, Golden Gate Transit, Greyhound, Paratransit Service, Muni, Chariot Transit, SamTrans, WestCAT Lynx	
San Francisco–4th and King Street (temporary until Salesforce Transit Center opens to trains); see the latest information	San Francisco	Existing, modifications needed	2029	Caltrain, Muni Metro, E Embarcadero	Muni, Flixbus	This will be the initial northern terminus of CAHSR.
Millbrae Intermodal Terminal at San Francisco International Airport; see the latest information	Millbrae	Existing, modifications needed	2029	BART, Caltrain (AirTrain (SFO) via BART)	SamTrans	
Diridon station; see the latest information	San Jose	Existing, modifications needed	2029	ACE, BART, Caltrain, Capitol Corridor, Coast Starlight, VTA light rail	Amtrak Thruway, California Shuttle Bus, DASH, Highway 17 Express, Monterey-Salinas Transit, RTD, VTA	
Gilroy station; see the latest information	Gilroy	Existing, modifications needed	2029	Caltrain	Monterey-Salinas Transit, San Benito County Express, VTA	
Merced Station; see the latest information	Merced	Planning agreement in place	2029 (CVS)	ACE, Gold Runner	YARTS	in IOS
Madera Station	near Madera Community College Center	Planning agreement in place	2029 (CVS)	Gold Runner		in IOS; site relocation
Fresno Station; see the latest information	Fresno	Existing, modifications needed	2029 (CVS)	Gold Runner	YARTS, Fresno Area Express	in IOS
Kings–Tulare Regional Station; see the latest information	near Hanford		2029 (CVS)	Cross Valley Corridor (planned)		in IOS
Bakersfield Station; see the latest information	Bakersfield	Planning agreement in place	2029 (CVS)	Gold Runner	Kern Transit	in IOS
Palmdale Transportation Center; see the latest information	Palmdale	Planning agreement in place	2033	Metrolink, Brightline West (planned)	Amtrak Thruway, AVTA, Santa Clarita Transit, Greyhound Lines; LA County Beach Bus (summer only)	
Burbank Airport Station; see the latest information	Burbank	Planning agreement in place	2033	Coast Starlight, Metrolink, Pacific Surfliner	Metro, BurbankBus, Glendale Beeline	
Los Angeles Union Station; see the latest information	Los Angeles	Existing, modifications needed	2033	Coast Starlight, Metro Rail, Metrolink, Pacific Surfliner, Southwest Chief, Sunset Limited, Texas Eagle	Antelope Valley Transit Authority, Big Blue Bus, Citadel Outlets Express, Dodger Stadium Express, FlyAway, Foothill Transit, Greyhound, Metro, Metro Bus Rapid Transit, OC Bus, Santa Clarita Transit, Torrance Transit	
Norwalk–Santa Fe Springs possible station	Norwalk	Optional, no decision made		Metrolink, Metro (planned)	Metro	
Fullerton possible station	Fullerton	Optional, no decision made		Metrolink, Pacific Surfliner	OC Bus	
Anaheim ARTIC Station; see the latest information	Anaheim	Existing, modifications needed	postponed	Metrolink, Pacific Surfliner	Greyhound, Metro, OC Bus, ART	

Note: The Authority considered a mid-peninsula station in Redwood City, Mountain View, or Palo Alto, but it was removed from the business plan in May 2016 due to low ridership projections, although the possibility was raised of adding one in the future.

== Phase 2 route details ==
External images
- Merced to Sacramento Section (DRAFT, July 2018)
- Los Angeles to San Diego Section map (DRAFT, May 2013)

There has been route planning for Phase 2, but no dates and no financing plans have been made. Proposition 1A requires that Phase 1 be completed before construction is started on Phase 2. The Phase 2 segments, Merced–Sacramento and Los Angeles–San Diego, total about 280 miles (450 km). The completed system length after these extensions are constructed will be about 800 miles (1,300 km).

In 2015, the following stations and options were proposed. Existing train stations, if any, are linked. There is often a choice of alignments, some of which may involve the construction of a new station at a different location.

=== NORTH: Merced to Sacramento ===
The segment from Merced to Sacramento will be built on dedicated high-speed rail tracks and go to:

- Modesto
- Stockton
- Sacramento Valley Station

Proposals for services through a future second Transbay Tube, a San Jose–Oakland line, and a Stockton–Union City line have been studied but are not in the Phase 2 plan adopted by voters statewide.

=== SOUTH: Los Angeles to San Diego via the Inland Empire ===
The southernmost segment from Los Angeles to San Diego will be built on dedicated high-speed rail tracks with several routing and stations options. Key stations are identified as:

- Ontario International Airport
- Escondido near Interstate 15
- San Diego International Airport

Trains may additionally call at:

- El Monte station
- West Covina
- Pomona (Pomona–Downtown station, or a site on Holt)
- San Bernardino (San Bernardino Transit Center, or a site near Interstate 10)
- Corona (near El Cerrito)
- March Air Reserve Base
- Murrieta (Interstate 15 and Interstate 215 options)

San Diego is considering how high-speed rail can play a role in their transportation options as Lindbergh Field is expected to reach maximum capacity between 2025 and 2030. A stop has been proposed at the north end of the airport in conjunction with a new transit center. Airport consultants suggest that the train could provide an alternative for California destinations such as Los Angeles, San Francisco, Sacramento and Ontario.
