= 2nd and King station =

Light rail station in San Francisco, California

2nd & King
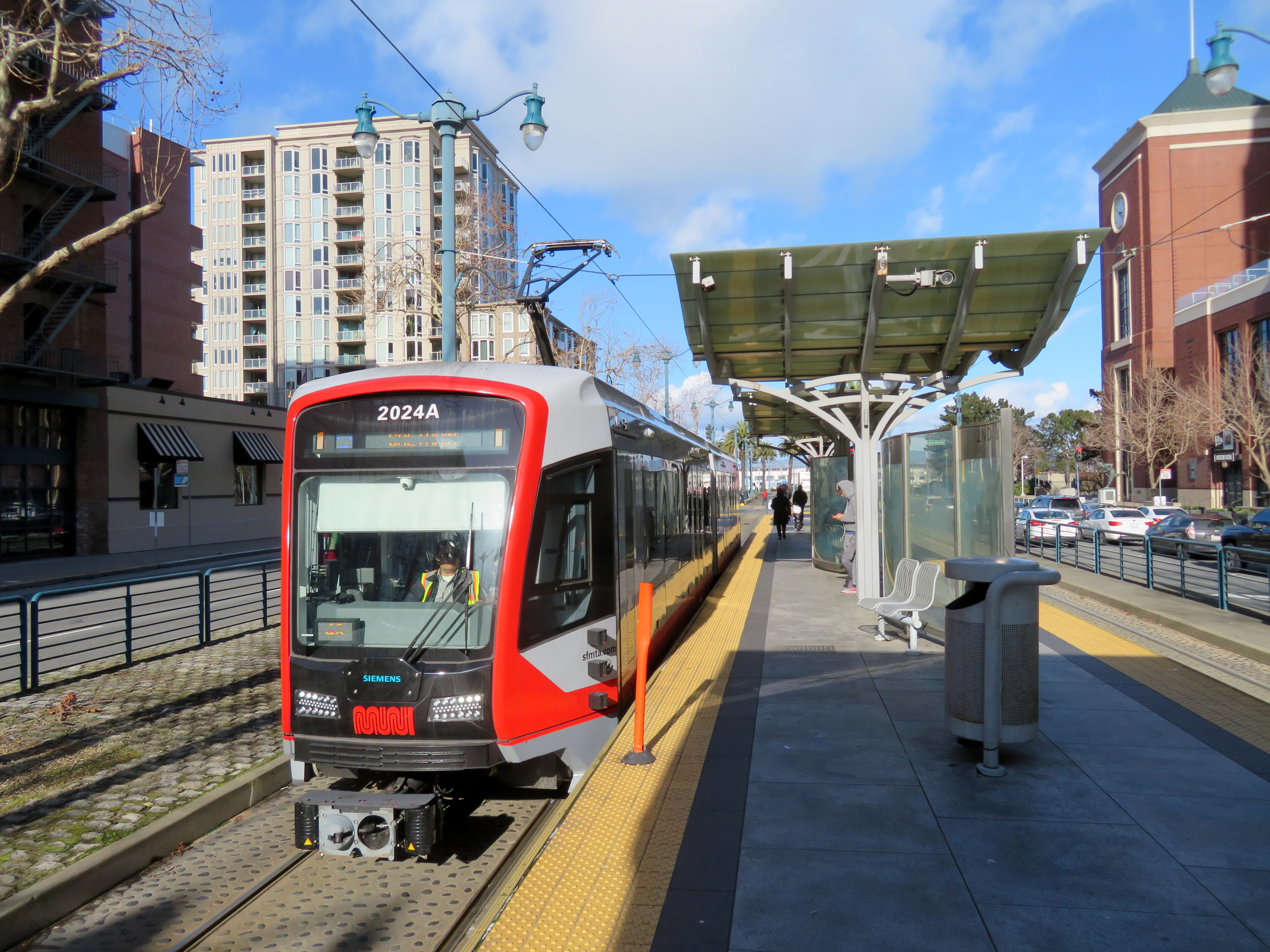
- N Judah train at 2nd and King station with ballpark at right

General information
- Location: King Street at 2nd Street; San Francisco, California
- Coordinates: 37°47′3.72″N 122°23′17.33″W
- Line: Muni Metro Extension
- Platforms: 1 high level island platform 2 low level side platforms
- Tracks: 2

Construction
- Accessible: Yes

History
- Opened: January 10, 1998

Services
Preceding station	Muni	Following station
Brannan toward Ocean Beach	N Judah	4th and King Terminus
Former services
Preceding station	Muni	Following station
Brannan toward Jones and Beach	E Embarcadero	4th and King Terminus
Brannan toward West Portal	T Third Street	4th and King toward Sunnydale
Location

2nd and King station is a Muni Metro light rail station located in the median of King Street near Second Street in the China Basin neighborhood of San Francisco, California. It is adjacent to Oracle Park, the home of the San Francisco Giants of Major League Baseball.

The station has both a high-level island platform for Muni Metro trains, and a pair of low-level side platforms at the south end of the station for historic streetcars, which are not in use as of 2026.

== History ==
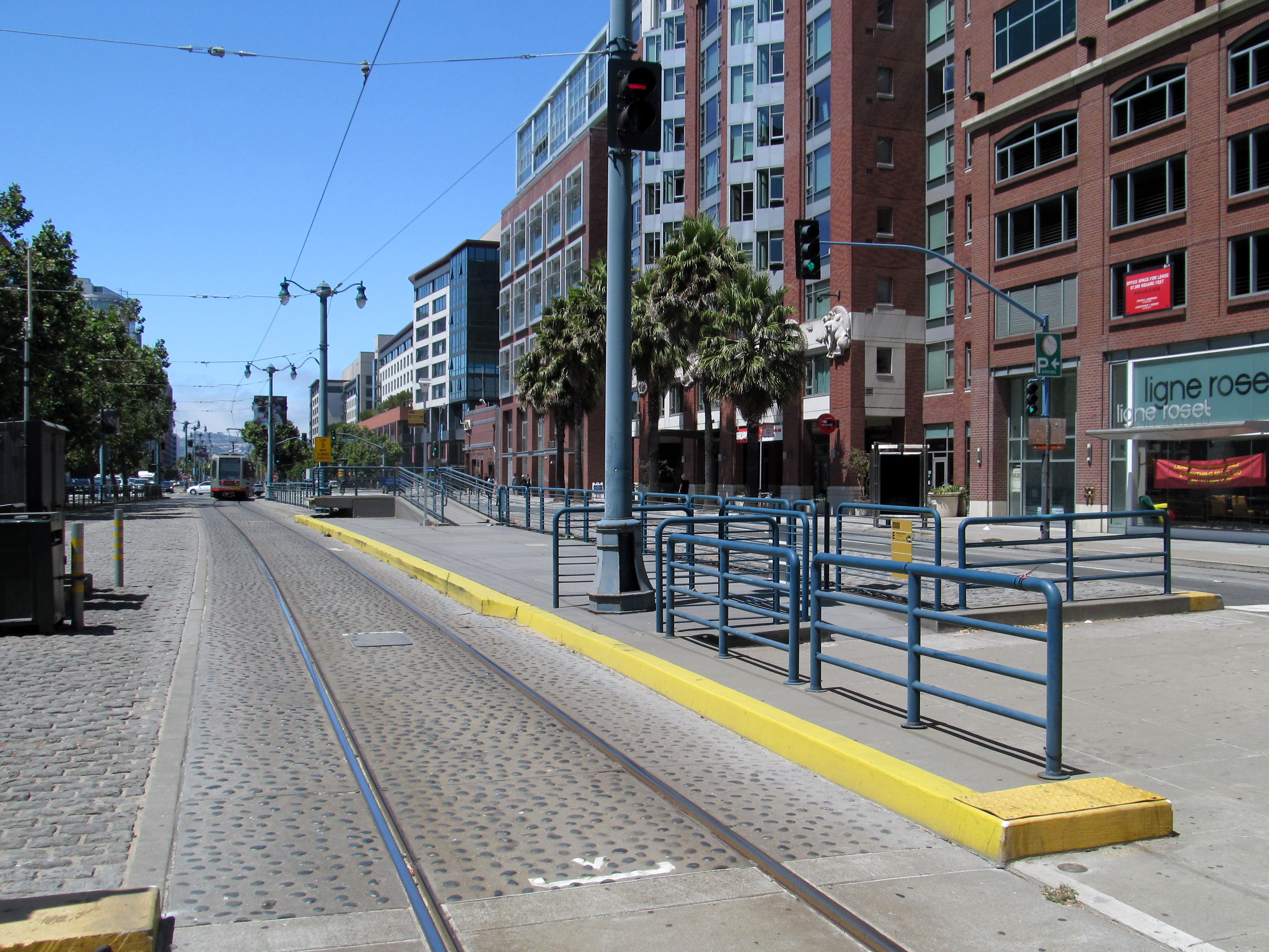
The 2015-opened streetcar platform

The station opened on January 10, 1998, as part of the Muni Metro Extension project. It was initially served by a temporary E Embarcadero line between Embarcadero station and 4th and King/Caltrain station. N Judah service replaced the shuttle service on August 22, 1998. The adjacent San Francisco Giants baseball stadium (then named Pacific Bell Park) opened in 2000, with 2nd and King station serving as a major transit connection for the stadium and surrounding redevelopment.

T Third Street service began on April 7, 2007; N Judah service was initially cut back to Embarcadero station, with J Church service added at peak hours. On June 30, 2007, the J and N were restored to their previous configuration. E Embarcadero heritage streetcar service was added on August 1, 2015, but ended in 2020 due to the COVID-19 pandemic.

T Third Street service was rerouted off King Street and into the Central Subway on January 7, 2023.

The station is served by the N Bus and N Owl bus routes, which provide service along the N Judah line during the early morning and late night hours respectively when trains do not operate.
