= Guébriant Islands =

Pair of islands in Antarctica

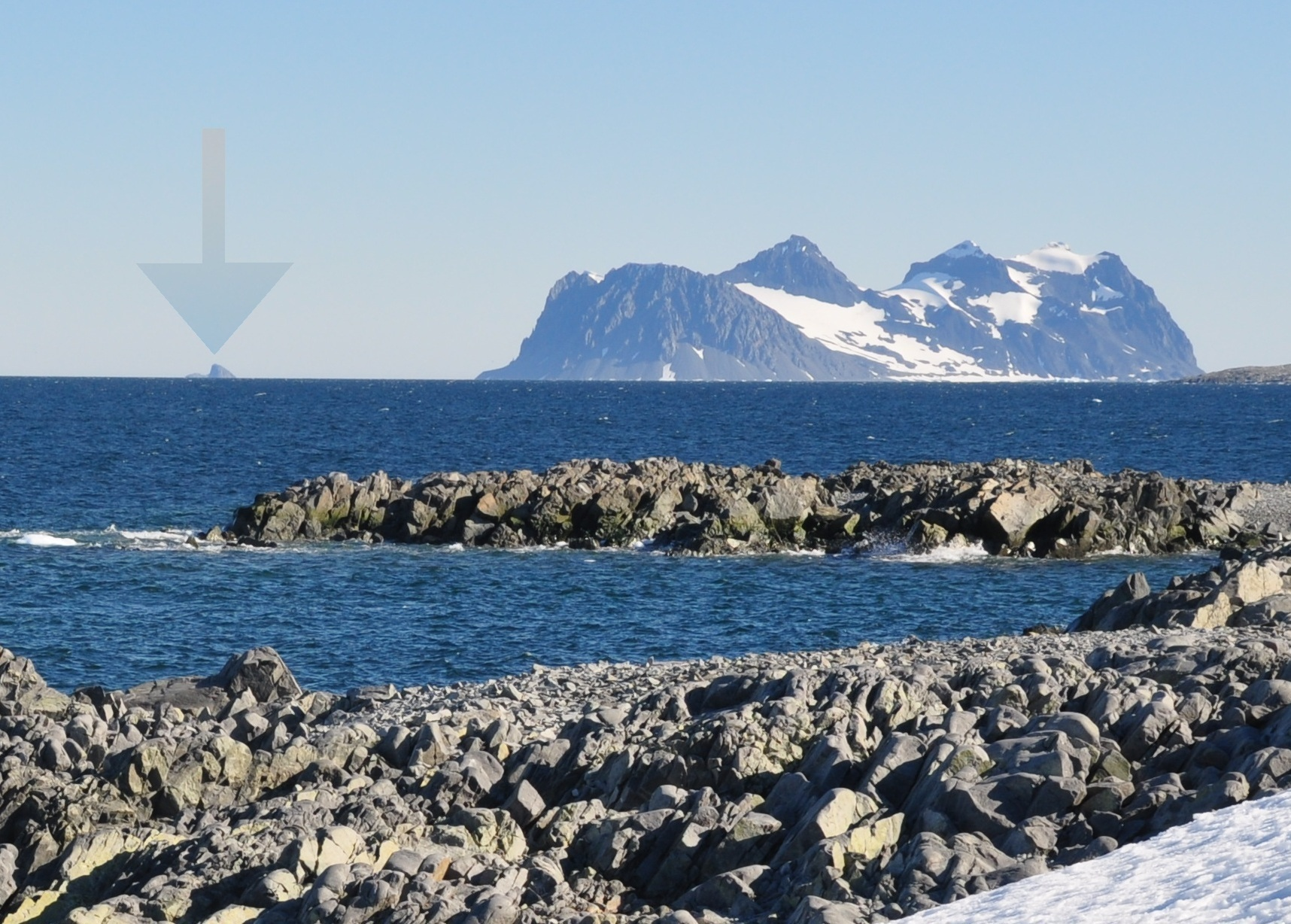
- The tiny Guébriant Islands (at arrow) seen from Rothera Point on Adelaide Island. The larger island on the right is Jenny Island.

- Location within Antarctica

Geography
- Location: Antarctica
- Coordinates: 67°48′S 68°25′W

Administration
- Administered under the Antarctic Treaty System

Demographics
- Population: Uninhabited

The Guébriant Islands (Spanish: Islotes Guébriant) are two islands west of the Antarctic Peninsula, in the northern part of Marguerite Bay, lying 9.3 kilometres (5 nmi) southeast of Cape Alexandra, the southeast cape of Adelaide Island. They were discovered by the fourth French Antarctic Expedition 1908–1910 under Jean-Baptiste Charcot and named by him as "Îlots de Guébriant" after the Reverend Jean Budes de Guébriant, a French Catholic missionary to China.

The islands were surveyed by the Falklands Islands Dependencies Survey (FIDS, the predecessor of the British Antarctic Survey) in 1948. They were recharted by a Royal Navy Hydrographic Survey Unit in 1963. Both islands have an elongated shape, stretching in a north east to south west direction. The smaller (northernmost) island is about 500 m long, 200 m wide and has a highest point of 92 meters. The southern island has a similar width and is about 1100 m long. It is much lower. The islands are separated by a channel about 200 m wide. In summer they become virtually ice free. About 1 km to the south-southeast of the islands lies Mission Rock, also named after missionary de Guébriant. Mission Rock is not considered part of the Guébriant Islands proper.

Argentina, Chile and the United Kingdom all consider the islands to be part of their national territory, as they fall within the overlapping Antarctic territorial claims of all three nations. However, there is no physical presence of any of these nations on the islands.

On a clear day, the islands can be seen from Rothera Research Station, a distance of about 28 km (see picture).

== Flora and fauna ==
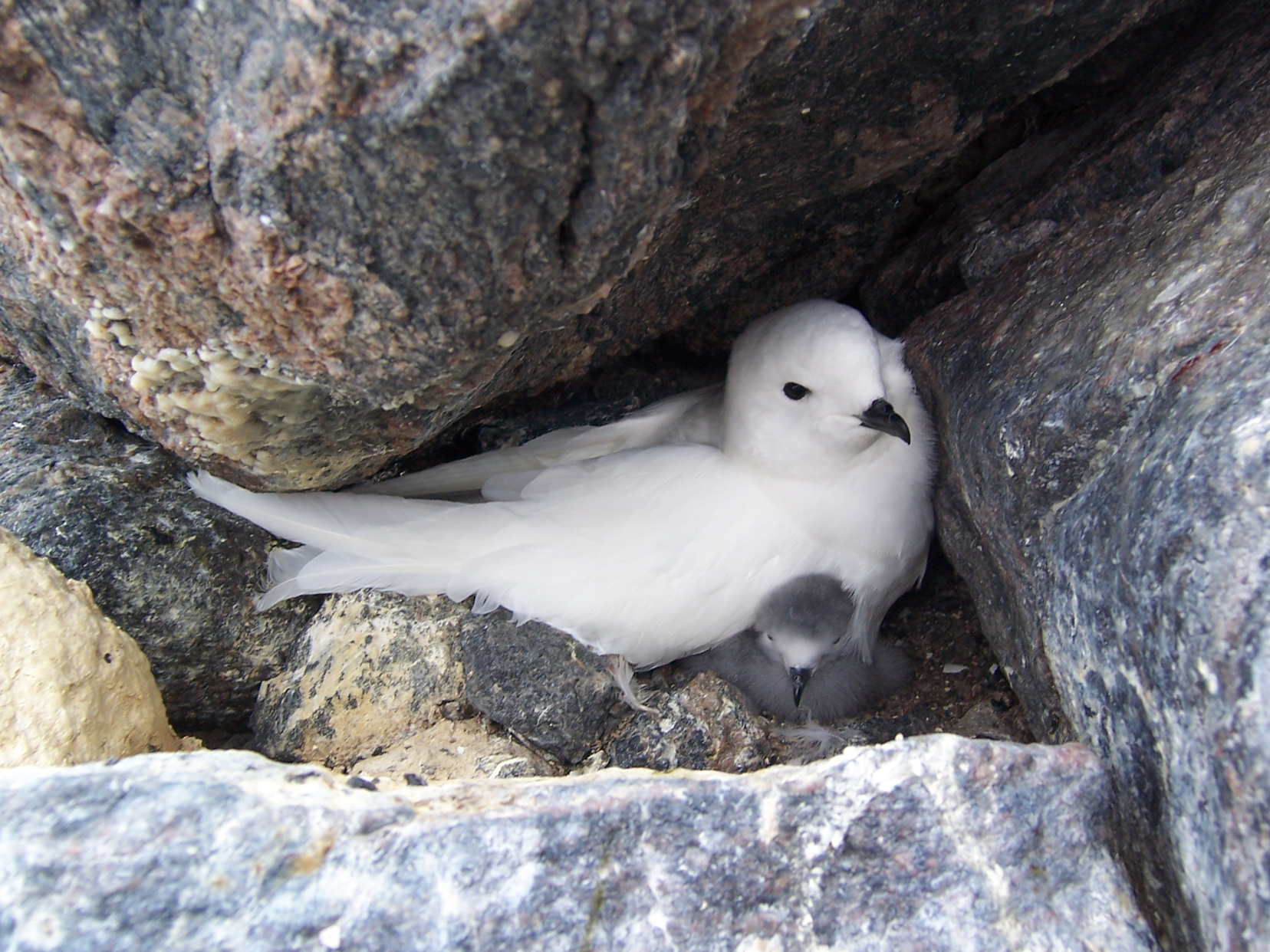
It is unknown whether snow petrels breed on the Guébriant Islands.

A publication from 1995 attempting to list all the breeding sites of the snow petrel (Pagodroma nivea) in Antarctica mentions the Guébriant Islands as a possible breeding site, based on a single observation from 1962. The vegetation of the islands consists of moss patches of the genera Brachythecium, Bryum and Drepanocladus, among other things. In these moss communities the most abundant nematodes are from the genera Plectus and Aphenchoides. In moss patches of Drepanocladus these worms may number 428,000 per square meter in just the uppermost 2.5 cm.

Alectoria minuscula f. biformis, a species of lichen, was found on the islands by B. Stonehouse and V.E. Fuchs on 13 October 1948 and was abundant at altitudes above 100 ft. Another lichen species, of the genus Lecanora, was found on the leeward slope of the southern Guébriant island at an altitude of 61 metres in 1961.

== See also ==
- List of Antarctic and sub-Antarctic islands
