= Bakersfield station (California High-Speed Rail) =

Proposed stop on the California High-Speed Rail corridor

Bakersfield

General information
- Location: Golden State Avenue; Bakersfield, California
- Coordinates: 35.390655°N 119.022328°W
- Owner: California High-Speed Rail Authority

History
- Opening: 2030; 4 years' time

Services
Preceding station	California High-Speed Rail	Following station
Kings–Tulare toward Merced	Phase 1 Initial Operating Segment	Terminus
Kings–Tulare toward Merced or San Francisco	Phase 1	Palmdale toward Anaheim
Location

Bakersfield station is a proposed California High-Speed Rail station in Bakersfield, California, United States. The station is part of the initial construction segment.

== History ==
The initial 2005 environmental impact report for the system considered two general alignments for the Fresno to Bakersfield segment: one following the BNSF Railway right-of-way down the center of the Central Valley, and another following the Union Pacific Railroad right-of-way farther to the east. The BNSF alignment was chosen because it avoided urban areas, making it less expensive and having fewer constructibility concerns. The preferred Bakersfield station option co-located it with the existing Bakersfield station at Truxtun Avenue due to its central location and connectivity with existing transportation. The city of Bakersfield had endorsed the Truxtun Avenue station location in 2003, but reversed its position in 2011 to oppose the High-Speed Rail project due to concerns on the impact to new facilities and revitalization to the downtown area that had occurred in the interim.

The environmental impact report for the Fresno to Bakersfield segment was approved in May 2014 by the California High-Speed Rail Authority, preserving the BNSF Railway alignment and Truxtun Avenue station location. Construction of this alignment would have impacted 526 structures, including 231 residences. The city of Bakersfield filed a lawsuit in June 2014 opposing this alignment. The lawsuit was settled in December 2014 with an agreement to instead adopt a "locally generated alignment" that uses the alignment of the slightly-farther-north Union Pacific Railroad, stopping at a new station near the intersection of F Street and Golden State Avenue. The new alignment is 1.3 miles (2.1 km) shorter, and its construction would be much less disruptive, impacting only 150 buildings, almost all of which are non-residential.

This change, along with an ongoing lawsuit with the nearby city of Shafter, California, caused the southernmost 8 miles (13 km) of the Initial Construction Segment to be delayed and not included as part of the first package of construction bids. A station planning agreement with the city was announced on September 15, 2015.

In February 2016, the California High-Speed Rail Authority's draft business plan stated that the funding on hand would only allow construction of the segment from San Jose to just northwest of Shafter, raising the possibility that a temporary station might be built near Shafter, 23 miles north of Bakersfield, if additional funds could not be obtained. The April 2016 revisions to the plan cut back the initial construction segment to Wasco, 30 miles north of Bakersfield, given its better connectivity to existing transportation.

As of December 2019, an elevated station design was being planned for the Bakersfield station.
