= Mission Rock station =

Muni Metro light rail station in San Francisco

Mission Rock
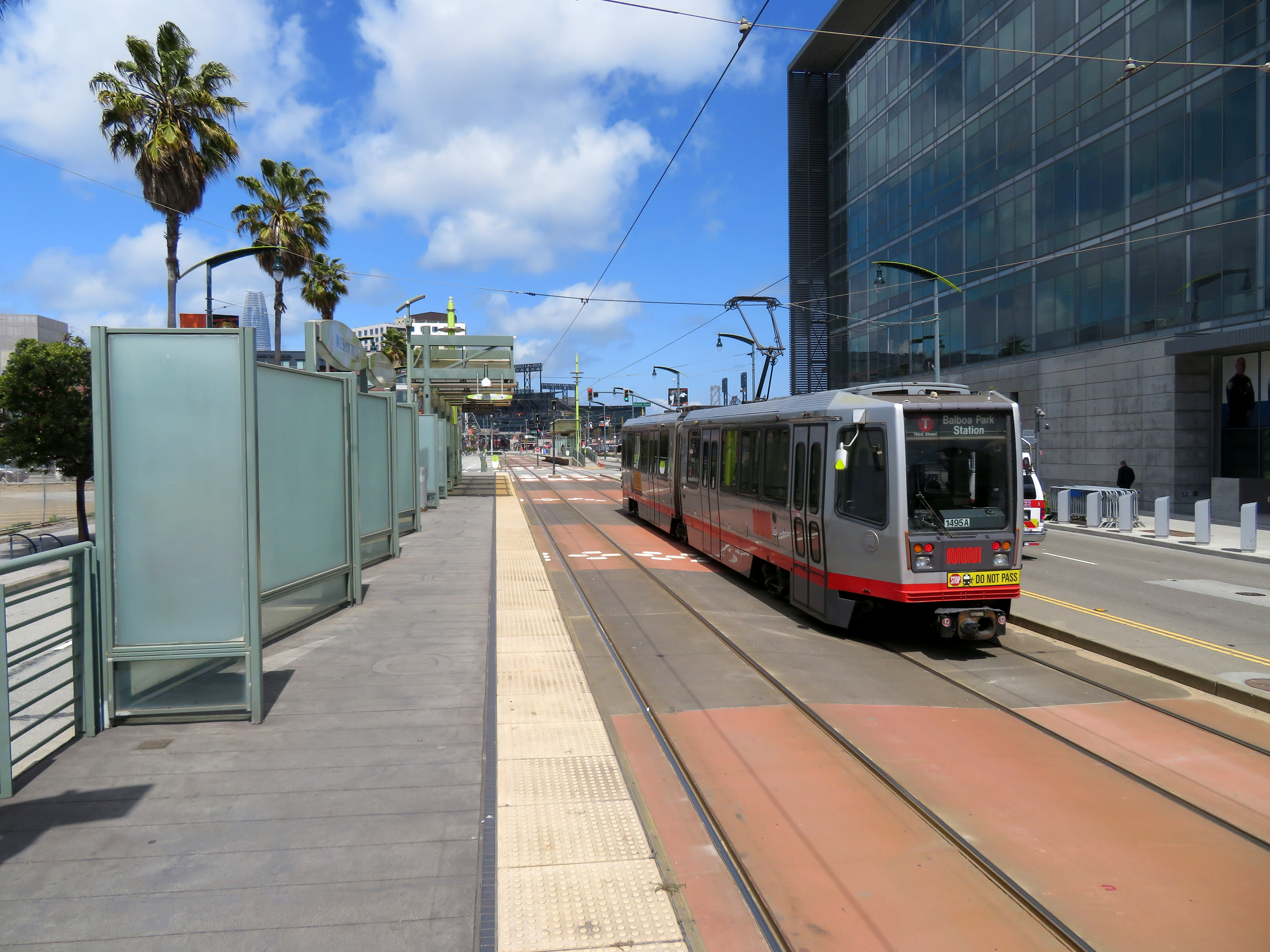
- A northbound train passing Mission Rock station in April 2018

General information
- Location: Third Street at Mission Rock Street; San Francisco, California
- Coordinates: 37°46′22.67″N 122°23′22.82″W
- Platforms: 2 side platforms
- Tracks: 2
- Connections: Muni: 22

Construction
- Cycle facilities: Bay Wheels station
- Accessible: Yes

History
- Opened: January 13, 2007

Services
Preceding station	Muni	Following station
4th and King toward Chinatown	T Third Street	UCSF/Chase Center toward Sunnydale
Location

Mission Rock station is a light rail station on the Muni Metro T Third Street line, located in the median of Third Street at Mission Rock Street in the Mission Bay neighborhood of San Francisco, California. The station opened with the T Third Street line on January 13, 2007. It has two side platforms; the northbound platform is north of Mission Rock Street, and the southbound platform south of Mission Rock Street, which allows trains to pass through the intersection before stopping at the station.

The stop is also served by the route 22 bus, plus the T Bus and 91 Owl bus routes, which provide service along the T Third Street line during the early morning and late night hours respectively when trains do not operate.
