= Cross Valley Corridor =

Proposed California passenger rail service

Technical
- Track gauge: 1,435 mm (4 ft 8 1/2 in) standard gauge

The Cross Valley Corridor is a proposed passenger rail service in the California Central Valley, connecting Visalia, Hanford, Porterville, and surrounding cities to each other and California High-Speed Rail's planned Kings–Tulare Regional Station.

== Design ==
=== Route ===
The 80-mile (130 km) route is proposed to run east–west, mostly along existing tracks. These rights-of way were originally constructed in the 1870s and 1880s by the Southern Pacific Railroad, which founded all the cities along the corridor when it first laid tracks, with the exception of the older city of Visalia. The tracks are currently owned by the Union Pacific Railroad (UPRR), with the San Joaquin Valley Railroad operating on nearly all of the corridor, except for a 1 mi (1.6 km) portion of the Union Pacific mainline connecting the eastern and western branches near Goshen.

The specific subdivisions projected for re-use as the CVC are:

- Hanford Subdivision (owned by UPRR), from Huron to SR 99
- Goshen Subdivision (UPRR), from SR 99 to Exeter
- Exeter Subdivision (UPRR), from Exeter to Lindsay
- Exeter right-of-way (City of Porterville), from Lindsay to Porterville

The projected termini are in Porterville (east) and Huron (west); the route follows SR 198 and SR 65. The easternmost 6 miles (9.7 km) of the route between Strathmore and Porterville were abandoned and the tracks pulled up, but the land was purchased by the City of Porterville to preserve the right-of-way.

=== Stations ===
Potential Cross-Valley Connector rail stations
No.	Name	Location	Sub	City	County	Notes / Refs.
1	Huron	Lassen & 9th	Hanford	Huron	Fresno	
2	NAS Lemoore	4,000 ft (1,200 m) N of Franklin Ave	Hanford	Lemoore Station	Kings	Serving Naval Air Station Lemoore
3	West Hills College Lemoore	Near Bush St	Hanford	Lemoore	Kings	Serving West Hills College Lemoore
4	Downtown Lemoore	Heinlen & E	Hanford	Lemoore	Kings	
5	Armona	14th Ave	Hanford	Armona	Kings	
6	Hanford	Seventh & Santa Fe	Hanford	Hanford	Kings	Connects to Amtrak (Gold Runner); two alternative sites to the east also proposed
7	Kings/Tulare	1/2 mi (0.80 km) E of SR 43 & 2,000 ft (610 m) N of SR 198	Hanford	Hanford	Kings	
8	Goshen	Ave 308 & Camp Dr	Goshen	Goshen	Tulare	Two alternative sites to the east also proposed.
9	Visalia Industrial	Goshen Rd, between American & Plaza	Goshen	Visalia	Tulare	Potential infill station, serving employment areas
10	Visalia Transit Center	E Oak & N Bridge	Goshen	Visalia	Tulare	
11	Visalia (2)	Ben Maddox & K	Goshen	Visalia	Tulare	Potential infill station, serving residential areas
12	Farmersville	W Front & N Farmersville	Goshen	Farmersville	Tulare	
13	Exeter	N G & W Pine	Exeter	Exeter	Tulare	Alternative option at Chestnut & F
14	Lindsay	Sweetbriar Ave & Honolulu St	Exeter	Lindsay	Tulare	Alternative option nearby
15	Strathmore	Ave 196 & Orange Belt	Exeter	Strathmore	Tulare	
16	Porterville Transit Center	N D & W Oak	Exeter	Porterville	Tulare	

Proposed stations for Cross Valley Corridor (†: termini)
- Fresno County
- Kings County
- Tulare County
1 Huron†
2 NAS Lemoore
3 West Hills College Lemoore
4 Lemoore
5 Armona
6 Hanford (Option 1)
7 Kings—Tulare
8 Goshen
9 Visalia Industrial Park (potential infill)
10 Visalia Transit Center
11 Visalia (Ben Maddox) (potential infill)
12 Farmersville
13 Exeter
14 Lindsay
15 Strathmore
16 Porterville Transit Center†

=== Phased implementation ===
Initial plans called for a three-phase implementation of the project. Originally, Phase 1 was to occur within ten years of opening CAHSR service, with existing and new local bus services from cities along the projected CVC route being coordinated to run to the planned Kings/Tulare high-speed rail station.

In July 2024, the Tulare County Association of Governments (TCAG) released the Cross Valley Corridor Phased Operations Plan. With this updated plan, Phase 1 has been split into three sub phases: Phase 1A, Phase 1B, and Phase 1C.

Phase 1A, which began service in July 2024, enhanced the existing Kings Area Regional Transit (KART) Route 15 Bus by adding a stop in Western Visalia and increasing service to 8 daily round trips. In addition to this, the service upgrades included limited weekend service, and timed transfers to improve connections at the Hanford Amtrak Station.

Phase 1B, which is expected to begin service at the end of 2025, will dramatically increase service on the route to every 30 minutes, every day of the week, between 6AM and 11PM on weekdays and 7:30AM to 11PM on weekends.

Phase 1C, which is expected to begin service in Fall 2027, will rebrand the service to be the Cross Valley Express (CVX), and extend the route to Lindsay Transit Center. This service will begin sometime between the opening of the Hanford Transit Center and the opening of California High-Speed Rail. Prior to the start of High Speed Rail service, the route will be extended to NAS Lemoore, and a fleet of branded double deck fully electric busses will serve the route. Additionally, service will be extended to midnight for all days.

Originally, Phase 2 was set to replace bus services with rail within 20 years of opening CAHSR for the central portion of the CVC, between Lemoore and Visalia, and open a rail maintenance facility in that segment. However, the latest plans call for the route to continue using these previously purchased double deck busses but instead stopping at the future Kings-Tulare Regional Station, with the Hanford Amtrak Station set to close with the opening of the Initial Operating Segment of CAHSR.

The draft plans called for a Phase 3, set to begin more than 20 years after CAHSR, which would have completed the entire CVC rail service; within Tulare County, bus services would connect the CVC station in Visalia with local communities. However, with the latest operating plans, this no longer appears to be the case.

The original cost of the total project was estimated at US$350 to 489 million, split approximately 2% to Phase 1, 48% to Phase 2, and 50% to Phase 3, though the updated plans state that Capital Infrastructure costs are estimated to be US$61 million for just bus services. Though the TCAG has not outright cancelled the plans for the final conversion to rail, it is unclear what the current costs of the rail project's build out will be, as is the timeline for which this will take place.

== History ==
Initial studies of a passenger rail service were conducted in the mid-1990s. A Cross Valley Rail Corridor Joint Powers Authority was founded, which raised $14.2 million from government and private sources to resurface the rail corridor in 2002–2003 to accommodate heavier freight traffic, and keep the line in operation in preparation for a passenger rail service. A 2004 study revisited passenger rail plans.

California High-Speed Rail offered $600,000 in funding for a station planning grant including the Cross Valley Corridor, providing that the City of Hanford (which is in Kings County) and Tulare County each provided $100,000 in matching funds. Hanford and Kings County have strongly opposed the high-speed rail project, while Visalia and Tulare County have supported it. In August 2015, the Hanford City Council voted not to spend the funds, but Tulare County officials proceeded with the planning process.

In April 2017, the Tulare County Association of Governments released an existing conditions report. In June 2018, it approved a final plan. The line was included in the 2018 California State Rail Plan as part of the 2040 Vision.
