= Mission Rock (Antarctica) =

Rock in Antarctica

Mission Rock (67°49′S 68°25′W) is a low-lying rock lying southwest of the Guébriant Islands, off the south end of Adelaide Island, Antarctica. It was surveyed by the Royal Navy Hydrographic Survey Unit, 1962–63, and was so named by the UK Antarctic Place-Names Committee in 1963 because of the rock's proximity to the Guébriant Islands, which were named for the French missionary Father Jean Budes de Guébriant.
