= Traffic island =

Object in the middle of a road designed to channel traffic

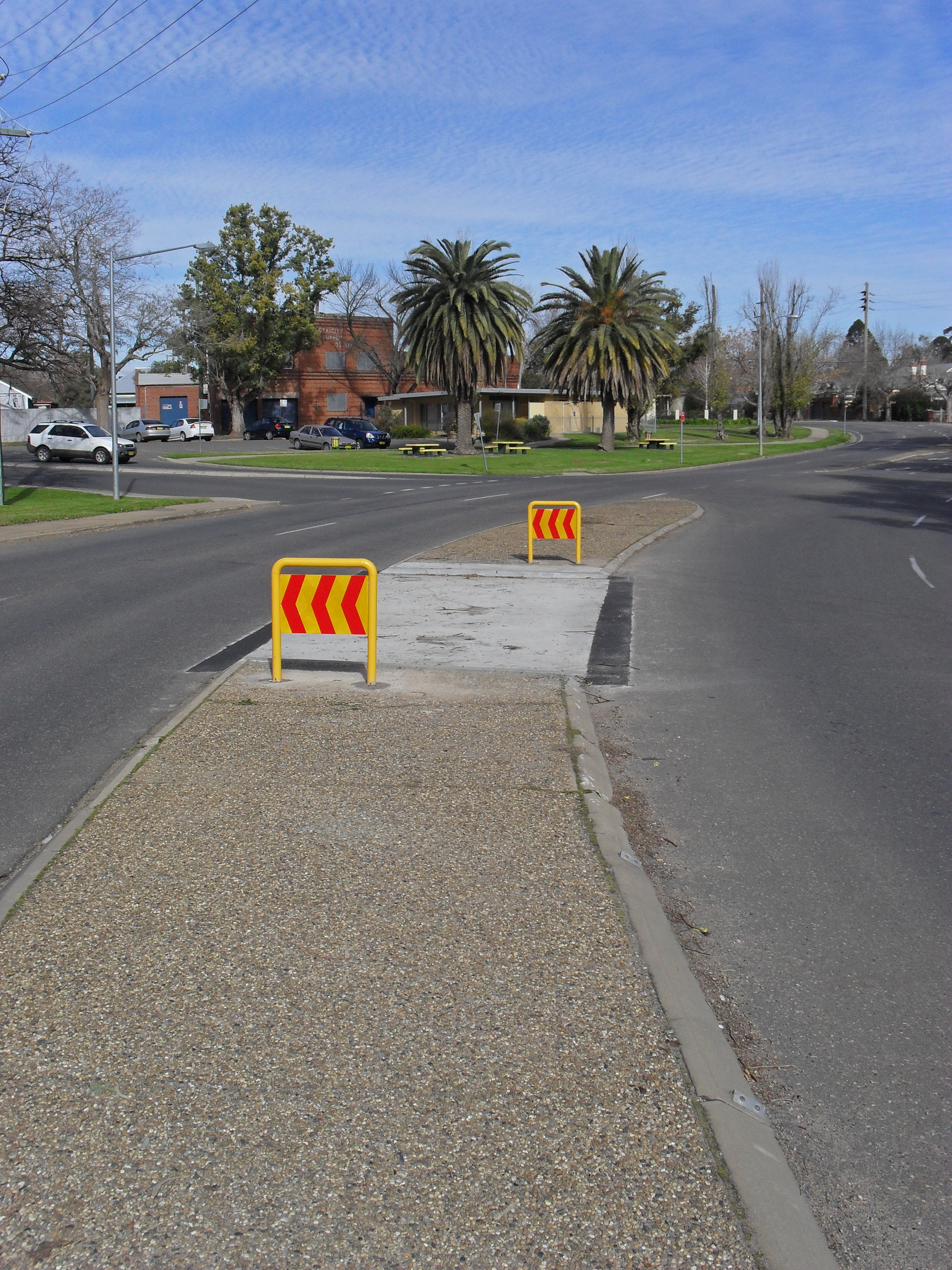
A traffic island in Wagga Wagga, New South Wales, Australia

A traffic island, or refuge island, also known as a pedestrian refuge or pedestrian island, is a solid or painted object in a road that channels traffic. It can also be a narrow strip of an island between roads that intersect at an acute angle. If the island uses road markings only, without raised curbs or other physical obstructions, it is called a painted island or ghost island (especially in the UK). Traffic islands can be used to reduce the speed of cars driving through or to provide a central refuge to pedestrians crossing the road.

When traffic islands are longer, they are called traffic medians, a strip in the middle of a road, serving as a divider over a much longer distance.

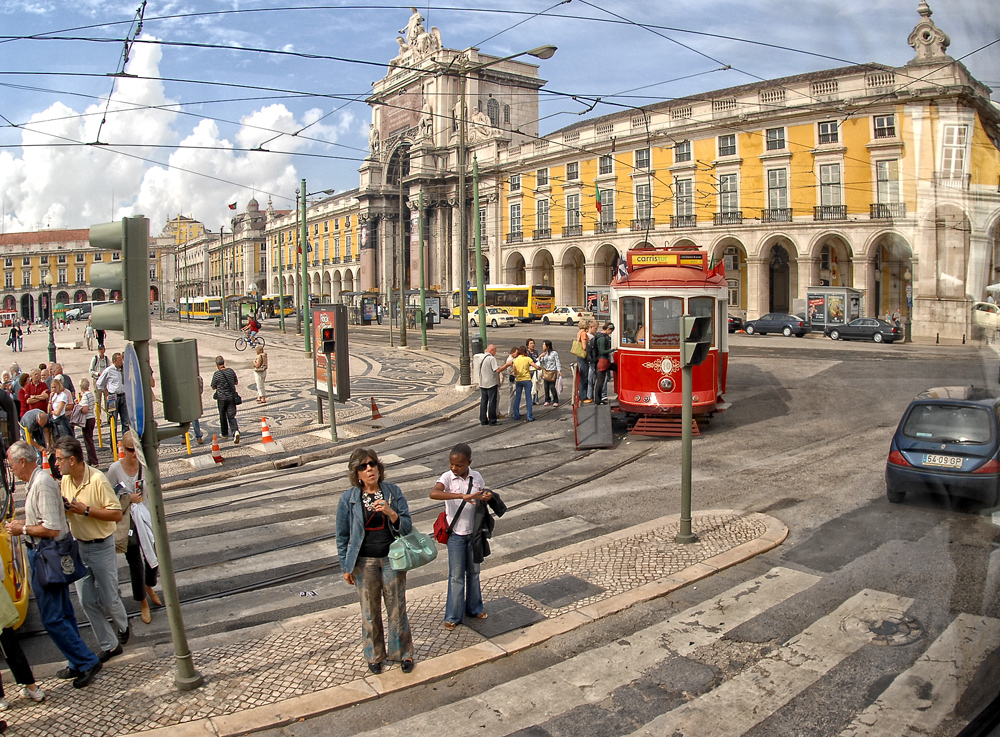
Refuge island in Lisbon, Portugal

Some traffic islands may serve as pedestrian refuge islands. Traffic islands are often used at partially blind intersections on back streets to prevent cars from cutting a corner with potentially dangerous results, or to prevent some movements altogether for traffic safety or traffic calming. Refuge islands may also be used when no light exists and pedestrians need safe harbour after managing one direction of traffic and before carrying on to the next. This significantly improves amenity for pedestrians trying to cross busy streets, as they are much more likely to find two small gaps in traffic rather than one situation in which gaps for both directions coincide. Since this reduces pedestrians' average waiting time, it also improves safety, with impatient pedestrians less likely to use gaps that turn out to be too short for safe crossing.

In certain areas of the United Kingdom, particularly in The Midlands, the term island is often used as a synonym for roundabout.
