= San Francisco station =

Train station in San Francisco, California, U.S.

San Francisco
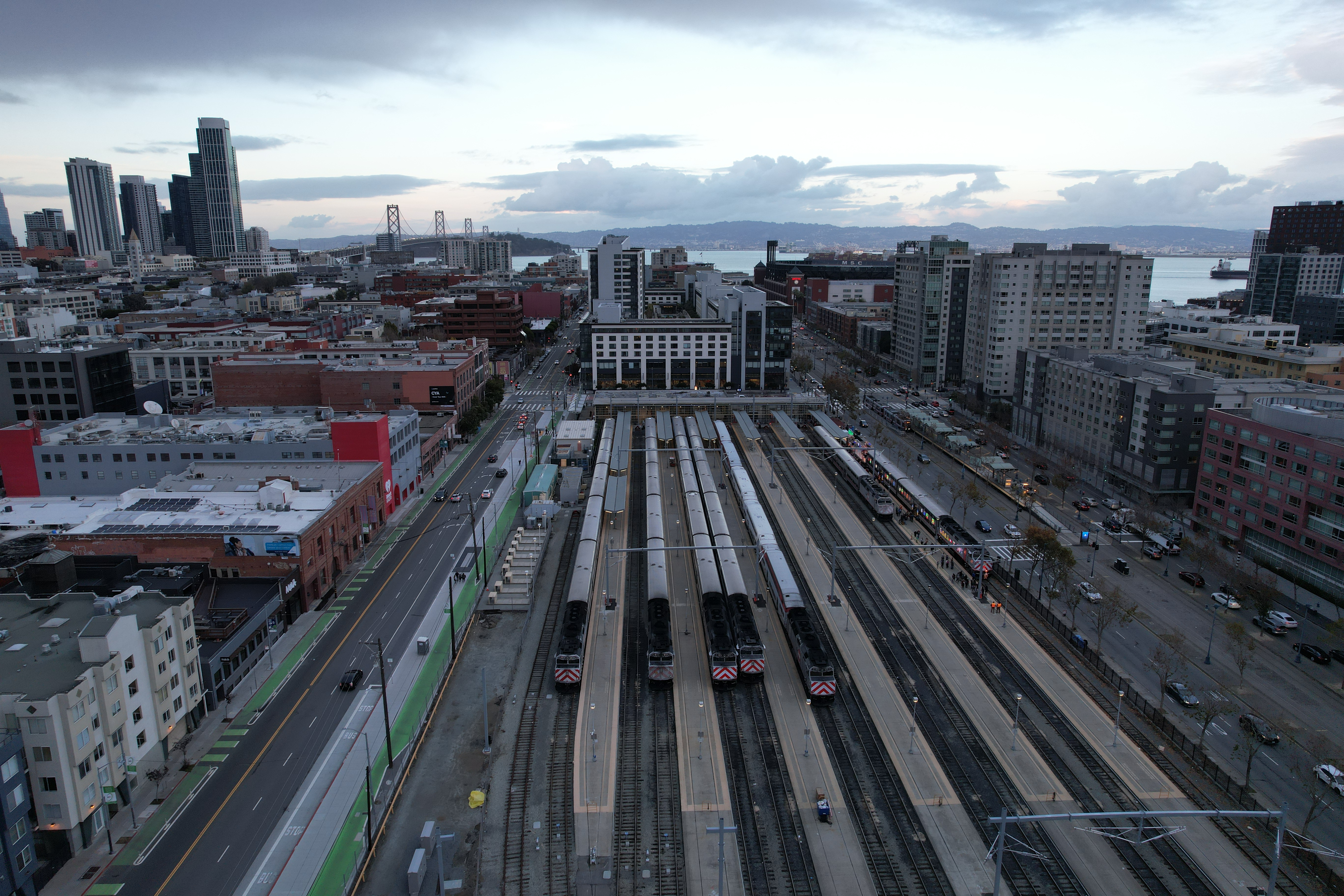
- San Francisco station in December 2022

General information
- Location: 700 Fourth Street at King Street; San Francisco, California
- Coordinates: 37°46′35″N 122°23′40″W
- Owner: Peninsula Corridor Joint Powers Board (PCJPB)
- Line: PCJPB Peninsula Subdivision
- Platforms: 6 bay platforms (Caltrain); 2 island platforms (Muni)
- Tracks: 13 (Caltrain); 4 (Muni)
- Connections: Flixbus; Muni: 15, 30, 45; Mission Bay Shuttle: East, Transbay/Caltrain, West

Construction
- Parking: Paid parking nearby
- Cycle facilities: Parking station, Bay Wheels station
- Accessible: Yes

Other information
- Fare zone: 1 (Caltrain)

History
- Opened: 1975 (Caltrain), 1998 (Muni)

Passengers
- FY 2025: 6,874 (weekday avg.) ▲43% (Caltrain)
Services
Preceding station	Caltrain	Following station
Terminus	Local	22nd Street toward San Jose Diridon or Tamien
Terminus	Limited	22nd Street toward San Jose Diridon
Terminus	Express	22nd Street toward San Jose Diridon
Terminus	Weekend Local	22nd Street toward San Jose Diridon or Tamien
Preceding station	Muni	Following station
2nd and King toward Ocean Beach	N Judah	Terminus
4th and Brannan toward Chinatown	T Third Street	Mission Rock toward Sunnydale
Former services
Preceding station	Caltrain	Following station
Terminus	Local (L1)	22nd Street toward San Jose Diridon or Tamien
Terminus	Weekend Local (L2)	22nd Street toward San Jose Diridon or Tamien
Terminus	Limited (L3)	Millbrae toward San Jose Diridon, Tamien or Gilroy
Terminus	Limited (L4)	22nd Street toward San Jose Diridon, Tamien or Gilroy
Terminus	Limited (L5)	22nd Street toward San Jose Diridon or Tamien
Terminus	Baby Bullet (B7)	Millbrae toward San Jose Diridon
Terminus	Baby Bullet (B7)	22nd Street (reverse peak) toward San Jose Diridon
Preceding station	Muni	Following station
2nd and King toward Jones and Beach	E Embarcadero Suspended	Terminus
Preceding station	Southern Pacific Railroad	Following station
Terminus	Peninsula Commute From 1975	23rd Street toward San Jose
Future services
Preceding station	Caltrain	Following station
Salesforce Transit Center Terminus	Local	22nd Street toward San Jose Diridon or Tamien
Salesforce Transit Center Terminus	Limited	22nd Street toward San Jose Diridon
Salesforce Transit Center Terminus	Express	22nd Street toward San Jose Diridon
Salesforce Transit Center Terminus	Weekend Local	22nd Street toward San Jose Diridon or Tamien
Preceding station	California High-Speed Rail	Following station
Terminus	Phase 1	Millbrae–SFO toward Merced or Anaheim
San Francisco (Salesforce) Terminus	Phase 1 Future	Millbrae–SFO toward Merced or Anaheim
Track layout
Key
Location

San Francisco station (also known as the Caltrain Depot and 4th and King station) is a train station in the SoMa district of San Francisco, California. It is the northern terminus of the Caltrain commuter rail line serving the San Francisco Peninsula and Santa Clara Valley. It is also served by Muni Metro; it is the eastern terminus of the N Judah and an intermediate stop on the T Third Street. The station is additionally the projected terminus for the first phase of the California High-Speed Rail project and a station once Phase 2 is completed.

== History ==
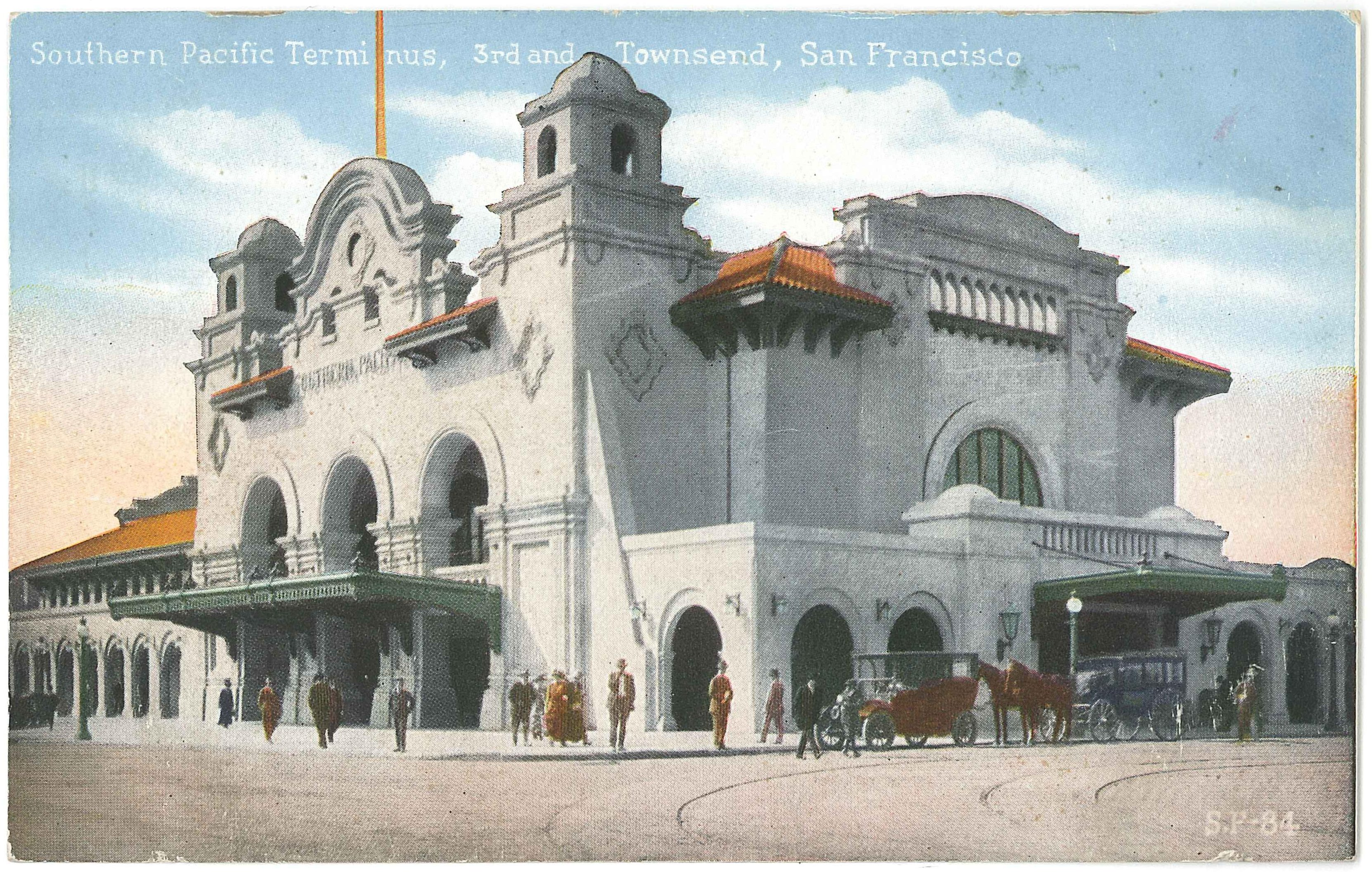
Southern Pacific's 3rd and Townsend terminal was replaced in 1975 by the current station.

The station is in the Mission Bay/China Basin area, bordered on the north by Townsend Street, east by 4th Street, and south by King Street. All 13 tracks approaching from the west presently terminate here, just short of 4th Street. The facility opened on June 21, 1975, replacing a station built in 1914 at 3rd and Townsend, one block away to the east.

The station is one block from Oracle Park, the home ballpark of the San Francisco Giants of Major League Baseball. Caltrain runs extra trains on game days to shuttle fans to and from the ballpark.

The Muni light-rail extension to the station was opened in 1998.

=== Future ===
The Portal project (formerly the Downtown Rail Extension) to the rebuilt Salesforce Transit Center includes the construction of an underground platform serving through tracks. The underground portion will be adjacent to the current station on the Townsend Street side, but Caltrain will continue using the surface platforms. Until that time, California High-Speed Rail trains are planned to utilize the existing station with modifications for that service.

Following the opening of the Portal project, California High-Speed Rail service will be extended to the Salesforce Transit Center, though most trains are intended to stop at the underground 4th and Townsend as an additional, secondary stop for San Francisco.

== Muni service ==
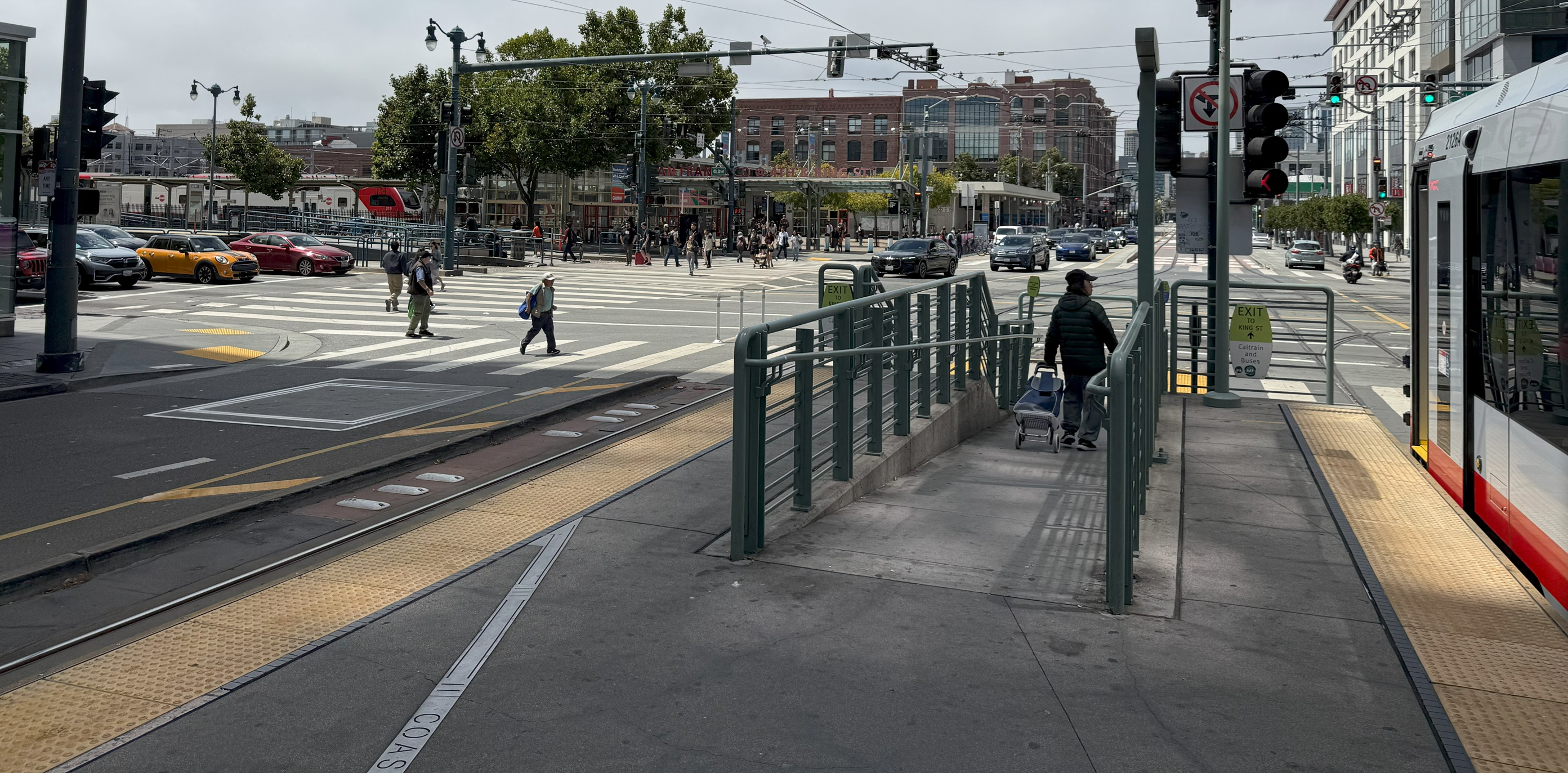
The T Third Street platform facing the Caltrain entrance with the N Judah platform on the left side

The station hosts a number of Muni bus lines and two Muni Metro light rail lines.

The N Judah light rail line runs through downtown via the Market Street subway, and the T Third Street line runs to Chinatown via Muni's Central Subway.

The N Judah platform is located on the median of King Street immediately southwest of the 4th and King intersection, while the T Third Street platform is located on the median of 4th Street immediately southeast of the intersection.

The station is also served by Muni bus routes 15, 30 and 45. Additionally, the N Bus, N Owl, T Bus and 91 Owl bus routes provide service along the N Judah and T Third Street lines during the early morning and late night hours when trains do not operate.
