= Construction of California High-Speed Rail =

High-speed rail project status as of July 2026

The California High-Speed Rail system is being constructed by the California High-Speed Rail Authority (CHSRA). The project is expected to span about 800 miles (1,300 km) and will be completed in two phases:

- Phase 1 (totaling about 500 miles (800 km)) runs from the San Francisco Bay Area in northern California to Greater Los Angeles in southern California. It has been partially funded and is under construction mainly in the San Joaquin Valley since 2015, as well as in "bookend" investments in the two metropolitan areas.
- Phase 2 is a future extension of the system north to Sacramento, and south through the Inland Empire to San Diego.

== Overview of project segments ==
Due to the project being only partially funded, the Authority is completing the environmental clearance of Phase 1 and focusing construction activity on the Early Operating Segment (EOS) (Note: Also known as the Initial Operating Segment (IOS)) in the Central Valley. The EOS is intended to be a self-contained and financially self-sustaining high-speed rail system, improving on and replacing the existing Amtrak Gold Runner service between Merced and Bakersfield. As funding becomes available, the Authority plans to extend the system to San Francisco in the northwest, and subsequently southwards to Los Angeles and Anaheim.

To deliver operational segments of high-speed rail, the Authority must seek environmental clearance, followed by design and civil construction, then track and systems installation, and static and dynamic testing.

Phase 1 status by segment
Section	Corridor type	Environmental clearance	Funding	Civil construction	Track & systems
San Francisco (Note: 4th and King station serves as the interim San Francisco terminus, with the planned Downtown Rail Extension project (also known as The Portal) providing an extension to the Salesforce Transit Center.) to San Jose	Blended (Caltrain)	Cleared	Partially funded (Caltrain electrification)	HSR construction not yet started	Electrified Caltrain service
San Jose to Gilroy	Blended (Caltrain)	Cleared	Not yet funded	Not yet started	Not yet started
Gilroy to Madera (Original) (Note: Authority to redetermine which mountain pass alternative for this route.)	TBD / Majority dedicated high-speed	Cleared	Partially funded	Not yet started	Not yet started
Gilroy to Madera (Alternatives)	TBD / Majority dedicated high-speed	Awaiting clearance	Partially funded	Not yet started	Not yet started
Merced Extension	Dedicated high-speed	Cleared	Fully funded, but possibly resequenced	60% design complete; advancing to 100% design and land acquisition	Procurement underway
Madera to Fresno	Dedicated high-speed	Cleared	Funded	In progress (CP 1)	Procurement underway
Fresno to Tulare/Kern	Dedicated high-speed	Cleared	Funded	In progress (CP 2-3)	Procurement underway
Tulare/Kern to Poplar Ave	Dedicated high-speed	Cleared	Funded	Substantively complete (CP 4) (Note: All structures and guideway complete except a 400 feet (120 m) section due to outstanding utility relocation)	Procurement underway
Poplar Ave to Bakersfield	Dedicated high-speed	Cleared	Funded	Advancing to 60% design	Procurement underway
Bakersfield to Palmdale	Dedicated high-speed	Cleared	Not yet funded	Not yet started	Not yet started
Palmdale to Burbank	Dedicated high-speed	Cleared	Not yet funded	Not yet started	Not yet started
Burbank to Los Angeles	Blended (Metrolink, Amtrak, and freight)	Cleared	Not yet funded	Not yet started	Not yet started
Los Angeles to Anaheim	Blended (Metrolink, Amtrak, and freight)	Cleared	Not yet funded	Not yet started	Not yet started

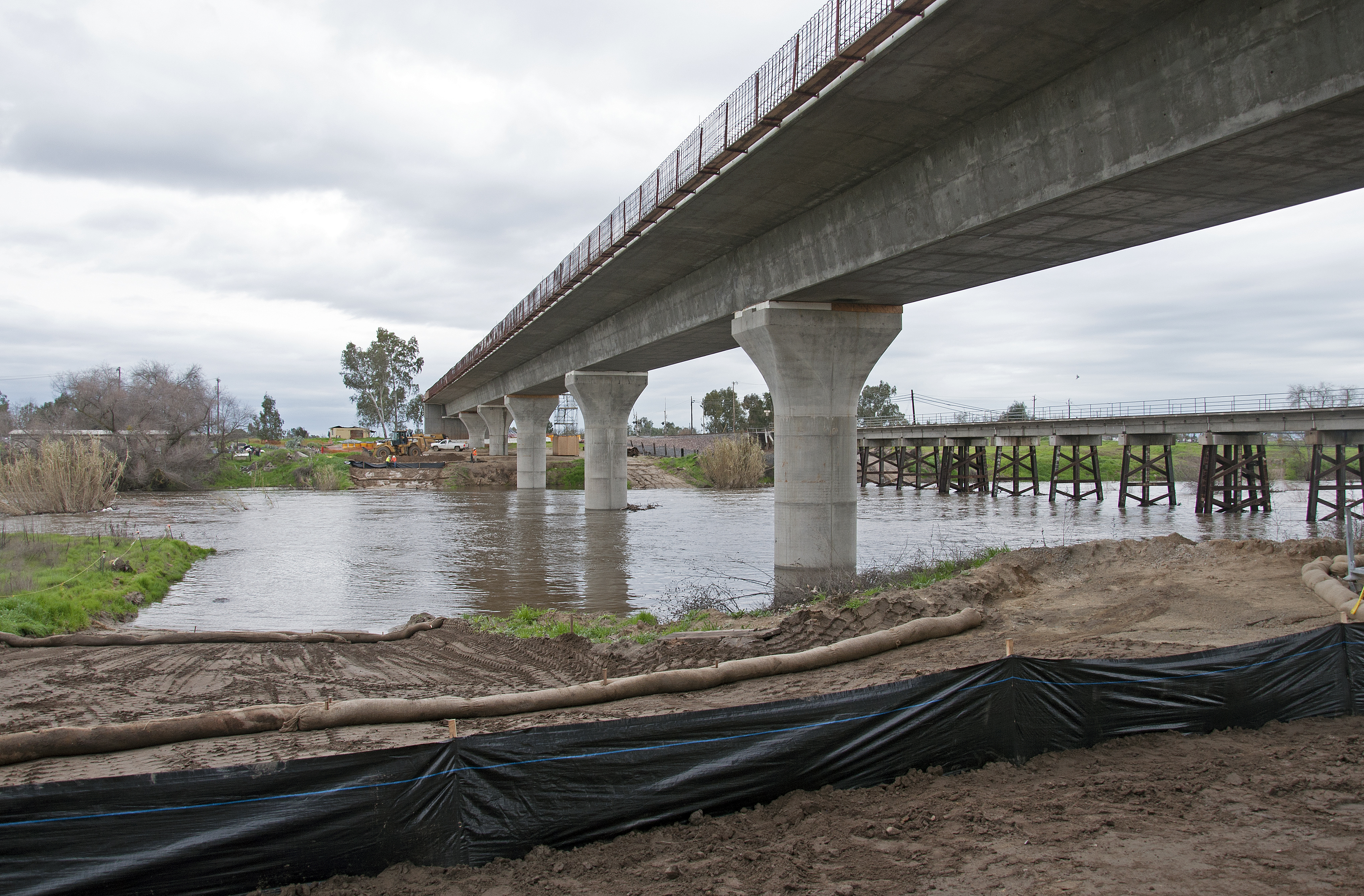
The Fresno River Viaduct under construction in 2017

== History of construction ==
=== Major construction milestones ===
- On December 2, 2010, the Authority Board of Directors voted to begin construction on the first section of the system (in the Central Valley).
- On July 19, 2012, Governor Jerry Brown signed legislation approving construction of the high-speed system.
- On January 6, 2015, the City of Fresno hosted a groundbreaking ceremony to mark the commencement of sustained construction activities.
- On January 6, 2025, groundbreaking for the railhead was held outside of Bakersfield, in a ceremony marking the substantive completion of CP 4 and the beginning of laying track.
- On November 26, 2025, the Authority Board of Directors officially opened a request for proposals for tracking and systems procurement for the entire Central Valley IOS from the Merced Extension to downtown Bakersfield.

=== Past projected construction timelines ===
The 2008 Business Plan projected that construction for the entire project would be completed by 2030.

The 2012 Business Plan projected HSR service between Los Angeles and San Francisco would not be available until 2029.

The 2016 Business Plan projected:

- By 2018: The Initial Construction Segment (ICS) would be completed – 130 miles (210 km) – Merced to Bakersfield.
- By 2022: Initial Operating Section (IOS) would be completed – 300 miles (480 km) – Merced to Burbank
- By 2027: Bay to Basin would be completed – 410 miles (660 km) – San Jose & Merced to Burbank
- By 2029: Phase 1 Blended would be completed – 520 miles (840 km) – San Francisco to Los Angeles/Anaheim

The 2018 Business Plan projected HSR service between Los Angeles and San Francisco will not be available until 2033.

The 2020 Business Plan projected HSR service between Silicon Valley and the Central Valley would be operational by late 2031, and that service between Los Angeles and San Francisco will be operational in 2033.

The 2022 Business Plan does not have a projected timeline for completion of any of the segments other than the Interim IOS, recognizing that financial constraints make such an estimate unpredictable. Table 5.0 gives estimates of costs to finish the construction in year of expenditure dollars, but assumes that there would be no major delays.

=== Initial construction approvals ===
On December 2, 2010, the Authority Board of Directors voted to begin construction on the first section of the system from Madera to Fresno, known as the Initial Construction Segment (ICS). Five "construction packages" were initially planned for this section. With the Design-Build contractual system the Authority was using, the contractor would be responsible for the final construction design elements, following the guidelines and specifications of the contract. The intent of this (as explained by Dan Richard, chair of the Authority) was to minimize last minute design change orders arising during the construction process (which tend to add to expenses and slow construction).

On December 20, 2010, due to the infusion of an additional $616 million in federal funds reallocated from states that cancelled their high-speed rail plans, the initial segment of construction was extended to Bakersfield. Another $300 million was reallocated on May 9, 2011, extending the funded portion north to the future Chowchilla Wye (where trains can be turned).

In September 2012, the Obama administration gave California's high-speed rail project the green light to streamline the permitting process for the 114-mile (183 km) section of the project which starts just north of Fresno in Madera County and runs south to Bakersfield.

On August 12, 2014, the federal Surface Transportation Board approved the HSR route from Fresno to Bakersfield. This was the final approval needed before beginning construction.

Also, on December 15, 2014, the federal Surface Transportation Board determined (using well-understood preemption rules) that its approval of the HSR project in August "categorically preexempts" lawsuits filed under the California Environmental Quality Act (CEQA). This cleared the last obstacle before construction could begin. However, this supposition is still being tested in the California courts in a similar case, Friends of Eel River v. North Coast Railroad Authority.

On June 10, 2015, the Authority authorized a "Rail Delivery Partner" contract to be negotiated and signed by the CEO, valued at up to $700 million, for services through 2022. This is a successor to the support provided by the current Project Management Team contract. The RDP will provide engineering and management services to see the project from a planning mode into a construction mode. The RDP partnership under the lead of Parsons Brinckerhoff includes Network Rail Consulting (the international consulting arm of the UK rail authority) and LeighFisher (a global management firm with extensive experience in infrastructure and advisory services). The other partnership competing was under Bechtel Infrastructure Corporation.

=== Central Valley Construction ===
As of October 2024, active construction in the Central Valley has been ongoing on 119 miles (192 km) of high-speed right-of-way with a design speed of 220 miles per hour (350 km/h). These 119 miles are constructed by three different consortia, split into so-called "construction packages (CPs)": CP 1, CP 2-3, and CP 4. The full "initial operating segment (IOS)" in the Central Valley will stretch 171 miles (275 km), with its remaining segments under advanced design and construction contracts yet to be awarded.

==== Initial contracts awards (119 miles) ====
CP 1. On August 20, 2013, the joint venture of Tutor Perini/Zachry/Parsons executed a design-build contract for the initial Madera to Fresno segment, about 29 miles (47 km) long. The contract is valued at approximately $985 million, plus an additional $53 million in provisional sums. Construction was originally expected to begin in 2013, but was delayed by the slow pace of property acquisition.

CP 2-3. Dragados of Spain, with Flatiron West of San Marcos, and Jacobs Engineering of Oakland, won the bid for the second design-build construction package on December 11, 2014. Dragados/Flatiron/Jacobs submitted a bid of $1,365,335,890 to design and build the 65-mile (105 km) stretch from the south end of Fresno to near the Tulare-Kern county line and was deemed the "apparent best value" bidder by the Authority. The winning bid came well below the range of $1.5 billion to $2 billion that was forecast by engineers and consultants working for the rail authority due to their innovative plan for cutting-and-filling instead of more expensive construction alternatives. This plan however was deemed impossible due to soil and hydrological conditions on site and the plan was reverted to its original designs.

CP 4. Five construction teams competed for this 22-mile (35.4 km) segment. This section was estimated to cost $400–500 million. In January 2016 the apparent best value bid of $347.5 million (about $50 to $150 less than the estimated cost) was received from California Rail Builders (a consortium led by Ferrovial Agroman US Corp, an American subsidiary of Spain's Ferrovial S.A., also including Eurostudios, a Spanish engineering firm, and Othon Inc., a Houston-based engineering and environmental consulting company). The California Rail Builders bid was $347.5 million. The contract awarded includes an additional $107 million for utility relocation costs for electric, gas and communication lines. This project has had the least issues out of all of the current construction packages and is set to be completed by late 2023.

This package was shortened by about 8 miles (13 km) to a length of 22 miles (35 km) due to disputes with the cities of Bakersfield and Shafter. The construction segment now ends on the north side of Shafter due to the need to negotiate routes through Shafter and northern Bakersfield. The agreement between the cities and the Authority gave the parties until January 2016 to come up with the new alignment. The Poplar Avenue to Bakersfield Locally Generated Alternative was signed by the Authority's CEO on October 31, 2019, and as of May 2022, geotechnical work has begun taking place.

==== Central Valley extensions (52 miles) ====
In August 2022, contracts for advanced design work, right-of-way mapping, and identification of utility relocation work in the Merced-Madera and the Shafter to Bakersfield (Locally Generated Alternative) segments were approved. Construction will only begin once the design and land has been acquired. This reflects a change from the approach taken with the first four construction packages. Utility relocations will also begin as land is purchased to speed the construction process and avoid delays.

The Merced to Madera extension design contract ($41 million) was awarded to Stantec Consulting Services Inc., for approximately 33.9 mi. with 40 structures. The Shafter to Bakersfield (Locally Generated Alternative) extension design contract ($44.9 million) was awarded to HNTB for approximately 18.5 mi. with 31 structures. These design contracts are expected to last into 2024.

==== Rail facilities and stations ====
The design contract for the Central Valley stations was awarded on October 20, 2022.

In addition, a large parcel will be needed for a rail yard, train sheds, machine shops, and other buildings for work on the tracks and trainsets in the Heavy Maintenance Facility (HMF). The counties of Fresno, Madera, Merced, Kings, and Kern all have expressed some interest in being selected for the site, since it is expected to provide up to 1500 good paying jobs. Per the May 2023 CEO Report to the Board, eleven potential sites have been identified in these four counties, and an architectural and engineering contractor will be selected (approximately by October 2023) for a two-year contract to evaluate the properties, develop the necessary environmental documents, and obtain necessary approvals. In 2025 staff will provide the Board with their preferred alternative for their decision.

=== Statewide connectivity projects ===
According to the Authority: "Connectivity or 'Bookend' Projects refer to the billions of dollars in infrastructure investment throughout the state that are part of the California High-Speed Rail system. These funds will strengthen and improve existing rail networks, while also connecting them with California's future high-speed rail system. Senate Bill (SB) 1029 passed by the California Legislature and signed by Governor Brown in July 2012, invests almost $2 billion from the Safe, Reliable, High-Speed Passenger Train Bond Act for the 21st Century (Proposition 1A) into transit, commuter, and intercity rail projects across the state. This funding leverages approximately $5 billion in additional funding for these projects."

Major "bookend" investments are underway to the north and south:

- The Caltrain electrification "bookend" investment in the Bay Area (as well as grade separations, etc.) is proceeding, and is expected to be completed in late 2024.
- A "bookend" investment in the "Link US" project (Phase A) will shortly begin construction for Los Angeles Union Station. Phase B still needs to be funded.

Other connectivity projects partly funded by the Authority are:

- Bay Area Caltrain Advanced Signal System (CBOSS/Positive Train Control)
- Bay Area Central Subway
- Bay Area Maintenance Shop and Yard Improvements
- Bay Area Millbrae Station Track Improvement and Car Purchase
- Central Valley Sacramento Intermodal Facility High-Speed
- Central Valley San Joaquin Corridor, Merced to Le Grand Segment 1
- Central Valley Stockton Passenger Track Extension
- Central Valley/Los Angeles Metrolink High-Speed Rail Readiness Program
- Los Angeles Metrolink Positive Train Control
- Los Angeles Positive Train Control, Los Angeles to Fullerton Triple Track
- Los Angeles Positive Train Control, Moorpark to San Onofre
- Los Angeles Regional Connector Transit Corridor
- San Diego Blue Line Light Rail Improvements
- San Diego North San Diego County Transit District, Positive Train Control
- San Diego Positive Train Control, San Onofre to San Diego

== Current status ==
=== Central Valley Segment (CVS) ===
As of October 2026, construction is primarily taking place on the Central Valley Segment (CVS), a section of the Early Operating Segment from Madera to Poplar Avenue totaling 92 structures and 119 miles (192 km) of guideway. As of October 2026, 70 of its structures are completed and 22 are underway; 90 miles of guideway are completed, 24 are underway, and 5 are not yet started. All 2,294 parcels that were needed have been delivered.

The CVS has been divided into three construction packages: CP 1 (Madera to Fresno), CP 2-3 (Fresno to Tulare/Kern), and CP 4 (Tulare/Kern to Poplar Ave).

==== Madera to Fresno (CP 1) ====
Construction Package 1 (CP 1) comprises 32 miles (51 km) between Avenue 19, north of Madera, and East American Avenue, south of Fresno. It includes 12 grade separations (GS), two viaducts, one tunnel, the San Joaquin River Viaduct, and the realignment of State Route 99. The contractor is the joint venture of Tutor Perini/Zachry/Parsons (TPZP), with whom the design–build contract was signed August 16, 2013. A Notice to Proceed was given on October 15, 2013; groundbreaking was on January 6, 2015, in Fresno; and commencement of construction for the package and overall high-speed rail system occurred on June 16, 2015, with the Fresno River Viaduct.

As of August 2026, out of 33 structures, 24 were completed and 9 are underway; out of 32 miles of guideway, 11 were completed, 16 are underway, and 5 had not yet begun construction. Substantial completion is expected by August 2027.

CP 1 status by project
# (Note: Includes only structures enumerated in the Business Plans and counted in the Central Valley Status Reports.)	Project	Distance	Status	Completion	Notes	Refs
1	Road 26 GS (Note: Grade Separation)	166.26 mi (267.57 km)	Completed	May 18, 2026	636 ft (194 m) long, 68 ft (21 m) wide; over HSR alignment and BNSF tracks.	
	Schmidt Creek Bridge		Completed	Apr 2025	Over Schmidt Creek.	
2	Road 27 GS	167.69 mi (269.87 km)	Completed	Aug 20, 2021	636 ft (194 m) long, 43 ft (13 m) wide; over HSR alignment and BNSF tracks.	
3	Avenue 17 GS	168.67 mi (271.45 km)	Completed	Oct 30, 2025	614 ft (187 m) long, 43 ft (13 m) wide; over HSR alignment and BNSF tracks.	
4	Fresno River Viaduct	169.99 mi (273.57 km)	Completed	Mar 2018	1,600 ft (490 m) long; over Raymond Rd, Fresno River, and SR 145. First construction project started in CP 1 and the CAHSR system establishing on June 16, 2015, and first structure completed in Madera County.	
5	Avenue 15 1/2 GS		Completed	Aug 26, 2022	468 ft (143 m) long, 40 ft (12 m) wide; over HSR alignment and BNSF tracks.	
6	Avenue 15 GS	171.32 mi (275.71 km)	Completed	Aug 26, 2020	278 ft (85 m) long, 42 ft (13 m) wide; over HSR alignment and BNSF tracks.	
7	Cottonwood Creek Viaduct		Completed	Mar 2018	250 ft (76 m) long; over Cottonwood Creek.	
8	Avenue 12 HSR Overhead	174.81 mi (281.33 km)	Completed	Oct 2020	167 ft (51 m) long; over HSR alignment and local access road.	
9	Avenue 12 BNSF Overhead		Completed	Oct 2020	Over BNSF tracks east of HSR alignment.	
10	Avenue 11 GS	175.82 mi (282.95 km)	Completed	Jul 31, 2019	110 ft (34 m) long, 34 ft (10 m) wide; over HSR alignment.	
11	Avenue 10 GS	176.85 mi (284.61 km)	Completed	Sep 8, 2020	116 ft (35 m) long, 35 ft (11 m) wide; over HSR alignment.	
12	Avenue 9 GS	177.94 mi (286.37 km)	Completed	Nov 15, 2023	177 ft (54 m) long, 66 ft (20 m) wide; over HSR alignment.	
	Private agricultural underpass		Completed	Jul 31, 2019	Box culvert-style agricultural underpass under HSR alignment for private farm road.	
13	Avenue 8 Overpass	179.08 mi (288.20 km)	Completed	Jul 31, 2019	110 ft (34 m) long, 34 ft (10 m) wide; over HSR alignment.	
14	Avenue 7 GS	180.27 mi (290.12 km)	Completed	Oct 2, 2020	196 ft (60 m) long, 43 ft (13 m) wide; over HSR alignment.	
15	San Joaquin River Viaduct & Pergola	181.59 mi (292.24 km)	Completed	Feb 2021	4,741 ft (1,445 m) long, 43 ft (13 m) wide; over San Joaquin River via a 200 ft (61 m) long arch span and UP tracks via a 1,626 ft (496 m) long pergola.	
16	Herndon Avenue HSR Underpass		Underway	Winter 2027 (exp.)	Under HSR alignment and UP tracks. As of November 2026, excavation work and utility relocations for the underpass are still ongoing; concrete pouring for the HSR bridge pier and abutments are completed awaiting framework removal; site for the UP bridge section is still being prepared for the next phase of construction as temporary retaining walls are being put into place.	
17	Herndon Avenue UPRR Underpass		Underway	Winter 2027 (exp.)	Under HSR alignment and UP tracks. As of November 2026, excavation work and utility relocations for the underpass are still ongoing; concrete pouring for the HSR bridge pier and abutments are completed awaiting framework removal; site for the UP bridge section is still being prepared for the next phase of construction as temporary retaining walls are being put into place.	
	Golden State Boulevard Realignment		Underway	Aug 2027 (exp.)	Road between Herndon Ave and Ashlan Ave being realigned west, allowing space for HSR alignment between new roadway and UP tracks. As of November 2026, roadway between just south of Shaw Ave and Ashlan Ave is now open to traffic; work just north of Shaw Ave is nearly completed awaiting striping and work under Shaw underway preparing for paving with both works for this section expected to be completed by December 13, 2026; IPB (intrusion protection barrier) walls are being erected between HSR and UP alignments with most of it completed; north of Veterans Blvd, only part of the new Golden State Blvd has finished construction while area near Herndon Ave excavation work has begun on sloping the new road down to meet with Herndon; almost all of the old road has been demolished; a new canal/trench has been constructed in the area as well as IPB walls.	
18	Veterans Boulevard Project (Note: Including Golden State Boulevard viaduct)		Completed	Sep 19, 2022	294 ft (90 m) long, 132 ft (40 m) wide over HSR alignment and UP tracks including an additional span over Golden State Blvd. Associated SR 99 interchange opened on November 20, 2023.	
19	Shaw Avenue GS	184.97 mi (297.68 km)	Underway	Dec 13, 2026 (exp.)	Over Golden State Blvd, HSR alignment, and UP tracks. As of November 2026, concrete pouring for the deck is completed with work for the barriers and roadwork now underway.	
	State Route 99 Realignment		Completed	Feb 2019	Portions of highway between Ashlan Ave and Clinton Ave shifted 80–100 ft (24–30 m) west to make space for HSR alignment.	
20	McKinley Avenue GS	188.99 mi (304.15 km)	Underway	Mar 2027 (exp.)	402 ft (123 m) long, 78 ft (24 m) wide; over Golden State Blvd, HSR alignment, UP tracks, and Weber Ave. As of November 2026, embankment works are completed with road and sidewalk work underway for them; all bents have been constructed with all girders on top of them; deck panels have been installed between the western abutment and western bent and are awaiting deck works for the rest of the bridge and then concrete pouring.	
	Motel Drive (Note: Another name for parts of Golden State Blvd due to many motels located along it.) Realignment		Completed	Aug 2026	Road between south of Clinton Ave and Olive Ave being realigned west, allowing space for HSR alignment between new roadway and UP tracks.	
21	Olive Avenue GS		Underway	Jul 2027 (exp.)	Over HSR alignment, UP tracks, and Weber Ave. As of August 2026, utility works are currently underway; land has been cleared on either end north of the current roadway for a temporary bypass.	
22	Belmont Avenue GS		Completed	May 23, 2025	611 ft (186 m) long, 62 ft (19 m) wide; over Wesley Ave, HSR alignment, UP tracks, and Weber Ave.	
23	Fresno Trench & State Route 180 Passageway	190.83 mi (307.11 km)	Underway	Sep 2027 (exp.)	About 1 mi (1.6 km) long, 40 ft (12 m) deep; under a rail spur, an irrigation canal, and SR 180. As of November 2026, the walls, floor, and lid for the tunnel are completed; excavation work for the slope of the trench from the north side are in progress now reaching Belmont Ave with concrete pour for the slope's floors and sidewalls are completed for almost half of this particular area; not much progress yet from the south side of the trench past the tunnel; old Belmont Ave trench has been removed and utilities relocated; work for a shoofly for the wye closer to Belmont is in progress; dig out of the tunnel under Dry Creek Canal has been completed; IPB walls are being erected between the trench and UP alignment.	
	Stanislaus Street Bridge		Cancelled		Demolition of existing structure is cancelled and will remain due to having adequate height clearance for current HSR requirements.	
24	Tuolumne Street Bridge		Completed	Aug 4, 2017	1,500 ft (460 m) long; over G St, HSR alignment, and UP tracks. Rebuilding of previous bridge to increase clearance and widen walkways and bike paths. First structure to be completed in Fresno County, CP 1, and CAHSR system.	
25	Fresno Street Underpass	191.85 mi (308.75 km)	Underway	Jun 2027 (exp.)	Lengthening and renovation of underpass under HSR alignment and UP tracks. As of November 2026, all remnants of the old roadways except for a vault has been removed; continued groundworks and utility relocations are underway; framework for abutments for the HSR bridge are underway.	
26	Tulare Street Underpass	192.03 mi (309.04 km)	Completed	Jul 31, 2025	1,000 ft (300 m) long, 60 ft (18 m) wide, 22 ft (6.7 m) deep; under G St, HSR alignment, and UP tracks.	
27	Ventura Street Underpass (Note: Returned to original name; formerly called Cesar Chavez Underpass.)	192.39 mi (309.62 km)	Completed	Mar 10, 2026	1,000 ft (300 m) long, 90 ft (27 m) wide, 15 ft (4.6 m) deep; under G St, HSR alignment, and UP tracks.	
	State Route 41 Freeway		Underway	TBD	Minor modifications to two existing structures (westbound and eastbound) carrying SR 41 over HSR alignment. As of September 2026, work on reinforcing foundations of the highway viaduct are underway.	
28	Church Avenue GS		Underway	May 2027 (exp.)	340 ft (100 m) long, 84 ft 6 in (25.76 m) wide; over HSR alignment and UP tracks. 345 ft (105 m) long, 84 ft (26 m) wide; over BNSF and SJVR tracks. As of November 2026, the western substructure concrete pouring of its deck is completed and awaiting barrier and roadworks; the eastern substructure has completed both abutments with work now underway for embankment works for the easternmost abutment; bent cap works for the eastern substructure bridge bent are underway.	
29	Jensen Trench		Underway	Feb 2027 (exp.)	3,800 ft (1,200 m) long, 14 ft (4.3 m) deep; under Church Ave and Jensen Ave. Routing between west embankment and 1st westernmost bridge bent to provide clearance for HSR alignment under road's pre-existing bridge. As of November 2026, utility and ground works for the trench is currently in progress mostly on the north side; excavation of the slope of the trench has reached the bridge while excavation south of the bridge has not begun yet and also work has extended north past Church Ave; concreting of the trench extends from Church Ave to just north of Jensen Ave; IPB walls are being erected between the trench and UP alignment.	
	Golden State Viaduct	194.91 mi (313.68 km)	Completed	Feb 2023	Over Golden State Blvd.	
30	Cedar Viaduct (Note: Also known as the Downtown Fresno Viaduct)	195.66 mi (314.88 km)	Completed	May 10, 2023	3,700 ft (1,100 m) long, 40 ft (12 m) wide; over North Ave, Cedar Ave, and SR 99.	
31	Muscat Avenue Viaduct	195.98 mi (315.40 km)	Completed	Jul 2019	Over Muscat Ave. Connecting between Cedar Viaduct and ground level.	
	Property access viaduct		Completed	Mar 2018	Short section allowing a property access road to run underneath.	
32	Central Avenue GS	196.48 mi (316.20 km)	Completed	May 23, 2025	432 ft (132 m) long, 42 ft (13 m) wide; over HSR alignment and BNSF tracks.	
33	American Avenue GS	197.49 mi (317.83 km)	Completed	Nov 2020	353 ft (108 m) long, 43 ft (13 m) wide; over HSR alignment and BNSF tracks. Allowance for additional track to access the HSR Heavy Maintenance Facility/Fresno Railhead.	

==== Fresno to Tulare/Kern (CP 2-3) ====
Construction Package 2-3 (CP 2-3) comprises 65 miles (105 km) from East American Avenue, south of Fresno, to 1 mile (1.6 km) north of the Tulare/Kern county border. It includes approximately 36 grade separations, viaducts, underpasses, and overpasses. The contractor is the joint venture of Dragados/Flatiron (DF), with whom the design–build contract was signed June 10, 2015. A Notice to Proceed was given on July 25, 2015, and groundbreaking took place in August 2018.

As of August 2026, out of 48 structures, 30 were completed and 18 are underway; out of 65 miles of guideway, 57 were completed and 8 are underway. Substantial completion is expected by March 2027.

CP 2-3 status by project
#	Project	Distance	Status	Completion	Notes	Refs
1	Lincoln Avenue GS		Cancelled		This grade separation has been cancelled and will not be constructed. Lincoln Ave will be terminated on either side of the HSR alignment.	
2	Adams Avenue GS	199.49 mi (321.05 km)	Completed	Dec 20, 2022	357 ft (109 m) long, 40 ft (12 m) wide; over HSR alignment and BNSF tracks.	
3	South Avenue GS	200.49 mi (322.66 km)	Completed	Feb 28, 2022	390 ft (120 m) long, 40 ft (12 m) wide; over HSR alignment and BNSF tracks.	
4	BNSF Track Realignment		Completed	Oct 2025	BNSF tracks realigned east allowing space for HSR alignment between South Ave and the Conejo Viaduct. As of August 2026, new realigned tracks have been installed and are in service; only some old tracks to the west of the HSR alignment remain and are being removed.	
5	Manning Avenue Overcrossing	201.49 mi (324.27 km)	Underway	Sep 2026 (exp.)	342 ft (104 m) long, 43 ft (13 m) wide; over HSR alignment and BNSF tracks. As of November 2026, both embankments and deck work are completed; barriers and road works are nearly completed.	
6	Floral Avenue GS	203.52 mi (327.53 km)	Completed	Jul 15, 2024	381 ft (116 m) long, 40 ft (12 m) wide; over HSR alignment and BNSF tracks.	
7	Nebraska Avenue GS	204.60 mi (329.27 km)	Underway	Nov 2026 (exp.)	785 ft (239 m) long; over HSR alignment and BNSF tracks. As of November 2026, embankment are completed; deck works are completed and work on barrier are nearly completed as well; roadworks are underway.	
8	Mountain View Avenue GS	205.58 mi (330.85 km)	Completed	Jul 15, 2024	368 ft (112 m) long, 40 ft (12 m) wide; over HSR alignment and BNSF tracks.	
9	Conejo Viaduct & Pergola	207.70 mi (334.26 km)	Completed	Aug 2026	2,000 ft (610 m) long, 34 ft (10 m) wide; over Conejo Ave and BNSF tracks via a pergola.	
10	Peach Avenue Viaduct	208.29 mi (335.21 km)	Completed	Dec 6, 2024	306 ft (93 m) long, up to 43 ft (13 m) wide; over Peach Ave.	
11	Elkhorn Avenue GS	210.18 mi (338.25 km)	Completed	Jul 7, 2023	345 ft (105 m) long, 40 ft (12 m) wide; over HSR alignment.	
12	Fowler Avenue Overcrossing	210.73 mi (339.14 km)	Completed	Dec 21, 2022	299 ft (91 m) long, 40 ft (12 m) wide; over HSR alignment.	
13	Davis Avenue Overcrossing	212.08 mi (341.31 km)	Completed	Oct 30, 2023	416 ft (127 m) long, 32 ft (9.8 m) wide; over HSR alignment.	
14	State Route 43 Tied Arch Bridge		Underway	Mar 2027 (exp.)	249 ft (76 m) long, 52 ft (16 m) wide; over SR 43; one of a series of 6 Kings River crossings. As of November 2026, nearly all framework has been removed; final works on the bridge are in progress with among them are tensioning the cables for the bridge. Reason for delay in its opening is unknown; only reported information is that it is now not expected to be open until March 2027.	
15	Cole Slough Viaduct		Completed	Aug 2026	317 ft (97 m) long, 40 ft (12 m) wide; over Cole Slough; one of a series of 6 Kings River crossings.	
	Private agricultural underpass		Completed	Aug 2026	Box culvert-style agricultural underpass under HSR alignment for private farm road. Located just inside the Fresno County line near where CP 2 and CP 3 would have met if segments were split.	
16	Dutch John Cut Bridge		Completed	Sep 2026	669 ft (204 m) long, 43 ft (13 m) wide; over Dutch John Cut; one of a series of 6 Kings River crossings.	
17	9th Avenue Viaduct	215.67 mi (347.09 km)	Completed	Jul 2023	Over 9th Ave; one of a series of 6 Kings River crossings.	
18	Cairo Avenue Viaduct	216.09 mi (347.76 km)	Completed	Dec 20, 2022	84 ft (26 m) long, 43 ft (13 m) wide; over Cairo Ave; one of a series of 6 Kings River crossings.	
19	Kings River Bridge		Completed	Aug 2026	445 ft (136 m) long, 43 ft (13 m) wide; over Kings River; one of a series of 6 Kings River crossings.	
20	Dover Avenue Overcrossing	217.82 mi (350.55 km)	Completed	May 3, 2023	227 ft (69 m) long, 43 ft (13 m) wide; over HSR alignment.	
21	Excelsior Avenue GS	218.3 mi (351.3 km)	Completed	Jun 12, 2026	Over HSR alignment.	
22	Elder Avenue GS		Cancelled		This grade separation has been cancelled and will not be constructed. Elder Ave will be terminated on either side of HSR alignment.	
23	Flint Avenue GS	220.86 mi (355.44 km)	Completed	Jun 26, 2024	205 ft (62 m) long, 40 ft (12 m) wide; over HSR alignment.	
24	Fargo Avenue GS	221.88 mi (357.08 km)	Completed	Jan 30, 2025	205 ft (62 m) long, 40 ft (12 m) wide; over HSR alignment.	
25	Grangeville Boulevard Viaduct	222.91 mi (358.74 km)	Underway	Dec 2026 (exp.)	Over Grangeville Blvd. As of November 2026, embankment works are underway; bridge deck has been pour and awaiting frame removal and work on barriers.	
26	Hanford Viaduct	223.94 mi (360.40 km)	Completed	Sep 2026	6,330 ft (1,930 m) long; over San Joaquin Valley Railroad tracks and SR 198.	
27	Hanford Armona Road GS	224.92 mi (361.97 km)	Completed	Oct 31, 2025	209 ft (64 m) long, 80 ft (24 m) wide; over HSR alignment.	
28	Houston Avenue GS	225.96 mi (363.65 km)	Completed	Nov 2026	450 ft (140 m) long, 40 ft (12 m) wide; over HSR alignment.	
29	Iona Avenue GS		Cancelled		This grade separation has been cancelled and will not be constructed. Iona Ave will be terminated on either side of HSR alignment.	
30	Idaho Avenue Overcrossing	227.96 mi (366.87 km)	Completed	May 3, 2023	205 ft (62 m) long, 40 ft (12 m) wide; over HSR alignment.	
31	Jackson Avenue Overcrossing	228.97 mi (368.49 km)	Completed	Sep 15, 2022	212 ft (65 m) long, 35 ft (11 m) wide; over HSR alignment. First structure to be completed in Kings County.	
32	State Route 43 Bridge at Jersey Avenue	230.27 mi (370.58 km)	Completed	May 21, 2026	437 ft (133 m) long, 43 ft (13 m) wide; over HSR alignment.	
33	Kent Avenue GS	231.18 mi (372.05 km)	Completed	Oct 12, 2022	215 ft (66 m) long, 35 ft (11 m) wide; over HSR alignment.	
34	Kansas Avenue GS	232.21 mi (373.71 km)	Completed	Nov 2, 2023	207 ft (63 m) long, 43 ft (13 m) wide; over HSR alignment.	
35	Lansing Avenue Underpass		Completed	Apr 2026	Box culvert-style agricultural underpass under HSR alignment.	
36	Cross Creek Viaduct		Completed	Apr 2026	2,500 ft (760 m) long, 43 ft (13 m) wide; over Cross Creek.	
37	State Route 43 Curved Bridge	235.82 mi (379.52 km)	Completed	Sep 2026	660 ft (200 m) long, 45 ft (14 m) wide; over HSR alignment.	
38	Newark Avenue Overpass		Cancelled		This grade separation has been cancelled and will not be constructed. Newark Ave will be terminated on either side of HSR alignment. West of HSR alignment, a new Niles Ave access road to Newark Ave has been constructed; east of HSR alignment, a realigned Niles Ave connection that parallels the HSR alignment to 5 1/2 Ave for east Newark Ave access has been constructed.	
39	Corcoran Highway Overpass (Note: Also known as Waukena Avenue Overpass.)	240.17 mi (386.52 km)	Completed	Aug 11, 2026	713 ft (217 m) long, 43 ft (13 m) wide; over existing canal, HSR alignment, and 5th and Orange Ave.	
40	Whitley Avenue Underpass	241.16 mi (388.11 km)	Completed	Apr 24, 2025	128 ft (39 m) wide, 17 ft (5.2 m) deep; under HSR alignment.	
41	156 Avenue Underpass		Completed	Oct 2025	Box culvert-style agricultural underpass under HSR alignment.	
42	Tule River Viaduct & Pergola	244.79 mi (393.95 km)	Completed	May 2026	3,573 ft (1,089 m) long; over Ave 144, SR 43, BNSF tracks, and Tule River via a pergola.	
43	Avenue 136 GS	245.77 mi (395.53 km)	Completed	May 2026	55 ft (17 m) long; over Ave 136.	
44	Avenue 120 GS	248.1 mi (399.3 km)	Underway	Nov 2026 (exp.)	Over HSR alignment, BNSF tracks, and SR 43. As of November 2026, embankments and abutments appears to be completed; all piers and girders for the bridge have been installed; deck work is currently underway.	
45	Lakeland Bridge		Completed	Aug 2026	402 ft (123 m) long, 43 ft (13 m) wide; over existing waterway.	
46	Avenue 88 GS	252.90 mi (407.00 km)	Completed	Aug 21, 2025	485 ft (148 m) long, 32 ft 8 in (9.96 m) wide; over HSR alignment, BNSF tracks, and SR 43.	
47	Deer Creek Viaduct		Completed	Sep 2026	3,000 ft (910 m) long, 43 ft (13 m) wide; over Deer Creek and adjacent wetlands to the south.	
48	Stoil Spur Railroad GS		Underway	Dec 2026 (exp.)	Over freight rail track spur. As of November 2026, deck work appears to be completed; work on barriers are currently underway.	
49	Alpaugh Bridge		Completed	Nov 2026	Over part of Alpaugh Pond. As of November 2026, bridge appears to be completed.	
50	Avenue 56 GS	257.16 mi (413.86 km)	Completed	Jun 16, 2025	219 ft (67 m) long, 35 ft (11 m) wide; over HSR alignment. First structure to be completed in Tulare County.	
51	Atwell Island-Alpaugh-Allensworth Trail Crossing (Note: Also known as Avenue 44 Agricultural Crossing.)		Completed	Aug 2024	Small box culvert-style agricultural underpass under HSR alignment.	
52	Avenue 24 GS	261.17 mi (420.31 km)	Completed	Oct 2024	Box culvert-style agricultural underpass under HSR alignment.	

==== Tulare/Kern to Poplar Ave (CP 4) ====
Construction Package 4 (CP 4) comprises 22 miles (35 km) from 1 mile (1.6 km) north of the Tulare/Kern border to Poplar Avenue, northwest of Shafter. It includes at-grade embankments, retained-fill overcrossings, viaducts, aerial sections of the high-speed rail alignment, and the relocation of four miles of existing Burlington Northern Santa Fe (BNSF) tracks. The contractor is California Rail Builders (CRB), a joint venture of Ferrovial and Griffith Company, with whom the design–build contract was signed February 29, 2016. A Notice to Proceed was given on April 15, 2016.

Substantial completion was achieved in 2024. As of August 2026, all 11 structures are completed; out of 21.2 miles of guideway, 21.1 are completed with only a remaining 0.1 underway. The remaining component is a single canal relocation.

Groundbreaking for the railhead was held outside of Bakersfield on January 6, 2025, marking the beginning of laying track.

CP 4 status by project
#	Project	Distance	Status	Completion	Notes	Refs
1	Garces Highway Viaduct	266.50 mi (428.89 km)	Completed	Jan 27, 2021	102 ft 4 in (31.19 m) long, 52 ft 8 in (16.05 m) wide; carrying alignment over Garces Highway. First project started in CP 4.	
2	Pond Road Viaduct	270.00 mi (434.52 km)	Completed	Jul 2021	121 ft (37 m) long, 52 ft (16 m) wide; over Pond Rd/Ave.	
3	Peterson Road Bridge	271.20 mi (436.45 km)	Completed	May 10, 2023	153 ft (47 m) long, 52 ft (16 m) wide; over Peterson Rd.	
4	Poso Creek Viaduct		Completed	Oct 28, 2020	240 ft (73 m) long, 56 ft (17 m) wide; over Poso Creek. First structure completed in Kern County and in CP 4.	
5	McCombs Road GS	277.30 mi (446.27 km)	Completed	Jul 18, 2023	415 ft (126 m) long, 40 ft (12 m) wide; over HSR alignment, BNSF tracks, and SR 43.	
6	State Route 46 Underpass		Completed	Mar 2024	Rebuilt underpass; under HSR alignment and BNSF tracks.	
7	Wasco Pedestrian Underpass	278.90 mi (448.85 km)	Completed	Mar 2024	58 ft (18 m) long, 15 ft (4.6 m) wide; box culvert underpass for pedestrians to cross under HSR alignment to access Wasco Amtrak station along adjacent BNSF tracks.	
8	Poso Avenue Underpass	279.40 mi (449.65 km)	Completed	Aug 3, 2023	1,084 ft (330 m) long, 67 ft (20 m) wide; under HSR alignment, BNSF tracks, and Wasco Ave (J St).	
9	Wasco Viaduct	280.40 mi (451.26 km)	Completed	Mar 2023	2,000 ft (610 m) long; over BNSF tracks via a pergola.	
10	Kimberlina Viaduct	281.40 mi (452.87 km)	Completed	Feb 2023	110 ft (34 m) long; over Kimberlina Rd.	
11	Merced Avenue GS		Completed	Aug 8, 2023	509 ft (155 m) long, 43 ft (13 m) wide; over SR 43, BNSF tracks, and HSR alignment.	

=== Merced and Bakersfield extensions ===
The Merced to Madera and Poplar Ave to Bakersfield segments (Merced and Bakersfield extensions, respectively) are under design, with completion of mapping and commencement of parcel acquisition targeted by the end of 2025. Design for both extensions is funded, and construction for the Bakersfield extension is funded from Poplar Ave to approximately Bakersfield Airport.

=== Northern and Southern California ===
"Bookend" investments in Northern and Southern California are underway to improve existing rail lines and prepare for the arrival of high-speed rail service. In the Bay Area, the Authority provided partial funding for the Caltrain Modernization Program, electrifying and adding positive train control to Caltrain commuter rail service; revenue service on electric trainsets began in 2024. In Los Angeles, the Authority is contributing funds for the Link Union Station (LinkUS) project, expanding capacity at Los Angeles Union Station.

== Station construction details ==
Five stations are planned for the Initial Operating Segment (IOS). The design contract for the central valley stations was awarded on October 20, 2022. This contact is for initial planning, including utilities management; a follow-on contract will be necessary for detailed station construction plans. The number of stations on the completed system was limited by Proposition 1A to 24.

At the start of operations of the Interim Initial Operating Segment (Interim IOS, Merced to Bakersfield) there will be 5 stations. These stations are discussed in the 2023 Project Update Report on pages 12–15. The report also has a timeline (on pages 8–9) that shows station construction is anticipated to commence in mid-2026, and finish in mid-2029.

Station Information
Station	Status	Location	Notes	Images
Merced	Initial planning & design	An aerial multi-modal hub station located adjacent to State Route 99, the Union Pacific Railroad Line and the Merced Transpo between R and O streets.	Local community is responsible	...
Madera	Initial planning & design	Located North of Ave. 12 in Madera	CHSRA is responsible, along with the San Joaquin Joint Powers Authority (SJJPA)	...
Fresno Historic Depot	Initial planning & design. The Fresno Historic Depot seismic retrofit design has also commenced and is expected to be completed in December 2024.	Located in downtown Fresno between Fresno, G, H, and Tulare streets. This will be a new station that incorporates the Historic Depot building into the site plan.	CHSRA is responsible	...
Kings-Tulare Regional	Initial planning & design	Located near the intersection of State Routes 198 and 43	CHSRA is responsible	...
Bakersfield	Initial planning & design	Project area is generally bounded by F Street to the west, 38th Street to the north, Union Avenue to the east and California Avenue to the south	CHSRA is responsible	...

Per the December 6, 2023 Board Memo: Construction Update:

"Central Valley Station Design Update
The station design contract was executed in March 2023 and awarded to Foster + Partners and Arup (F+P Arup) for the first phase of station designs. The preliminary designs for the four Central Valley stations have started, and the concept designs were submitted to the Authority in November 2023. The Fresno Historic Depot seismic retrofit design also commenced and is expected to be completed in December 2024. Outreach and coordination efforts with local agencies and stakeholders will remain ongoing as the design of stations advances."
