= 2017 California floods =

2017 regional natural disaster event

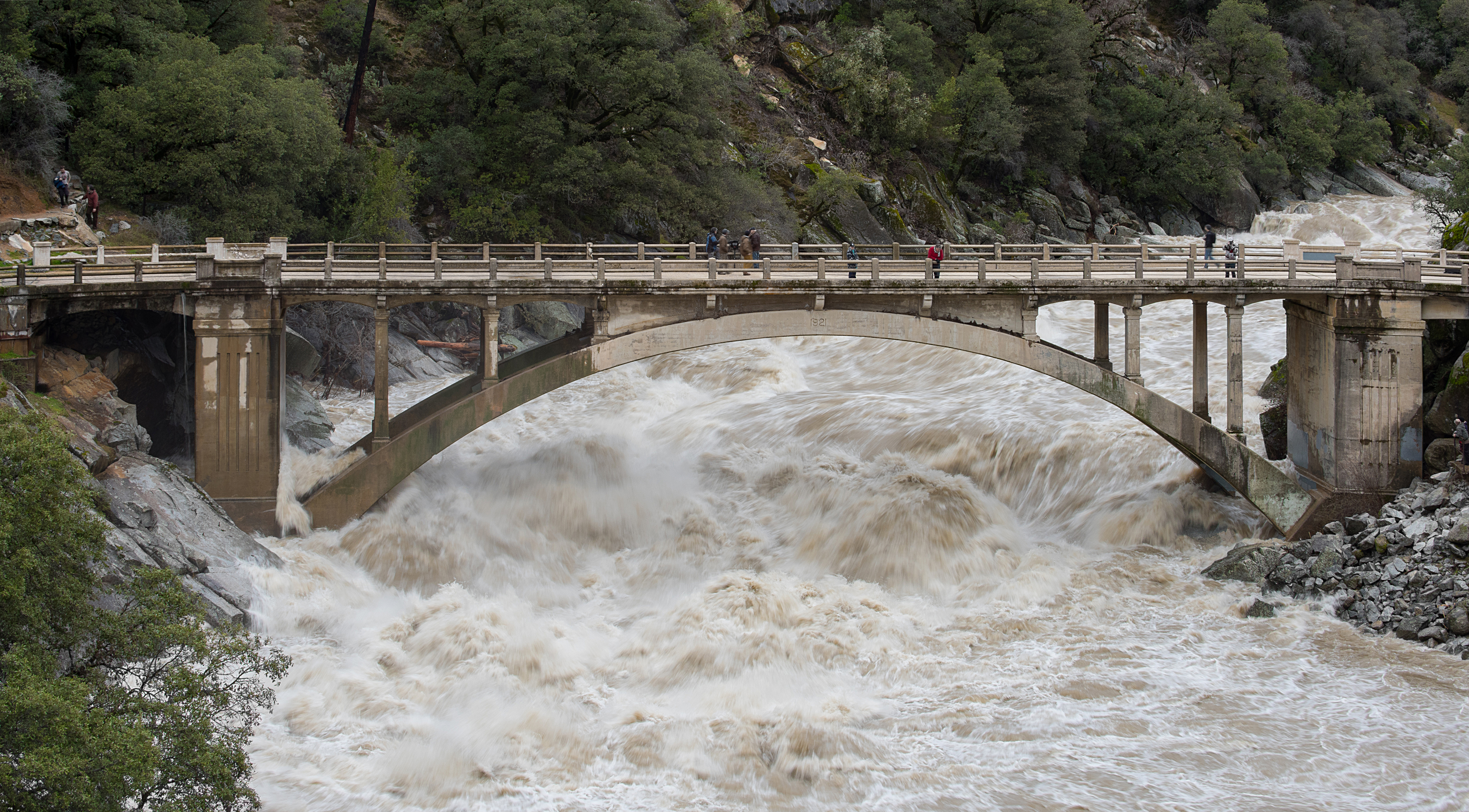
- The South Yuba River at Highway 49 floods after heavy rain on January 9, 2017. The flow is about 25,000 cubic feet per second (710 m^{3}/s), more than 40 times the normal rate.
- Date: January 7 – February 22, 2017
- Location: California Nevada
- Deaths: At least 5 directly
- Property damage: >$1.55 billion ($2,035,874,287 today)

Flooding in 2017 affected parts of California in the first half of the year. Northern California saw its wettest winter in almost a century, breaking the record set in 1982–83. The same storm systems also flooded parts of western Nevada and southern Oregon. The damage was estimated at $1.55 billion ($2,035,874,287 today), including damage to California roads and highways estimated at more than $1.05 billion.

The flooding occurred at the end of one of California's worst droughts on record, and much of the state was unprepared to handle the huge volume of rain and snow. The precipitation helped to refill surface water supplies, including many major lakes and reservoirs, but had limited impact on groundwater reserves. Governor Jerry Brown declared the drought officially over on April 4, 2017.

== Background ==
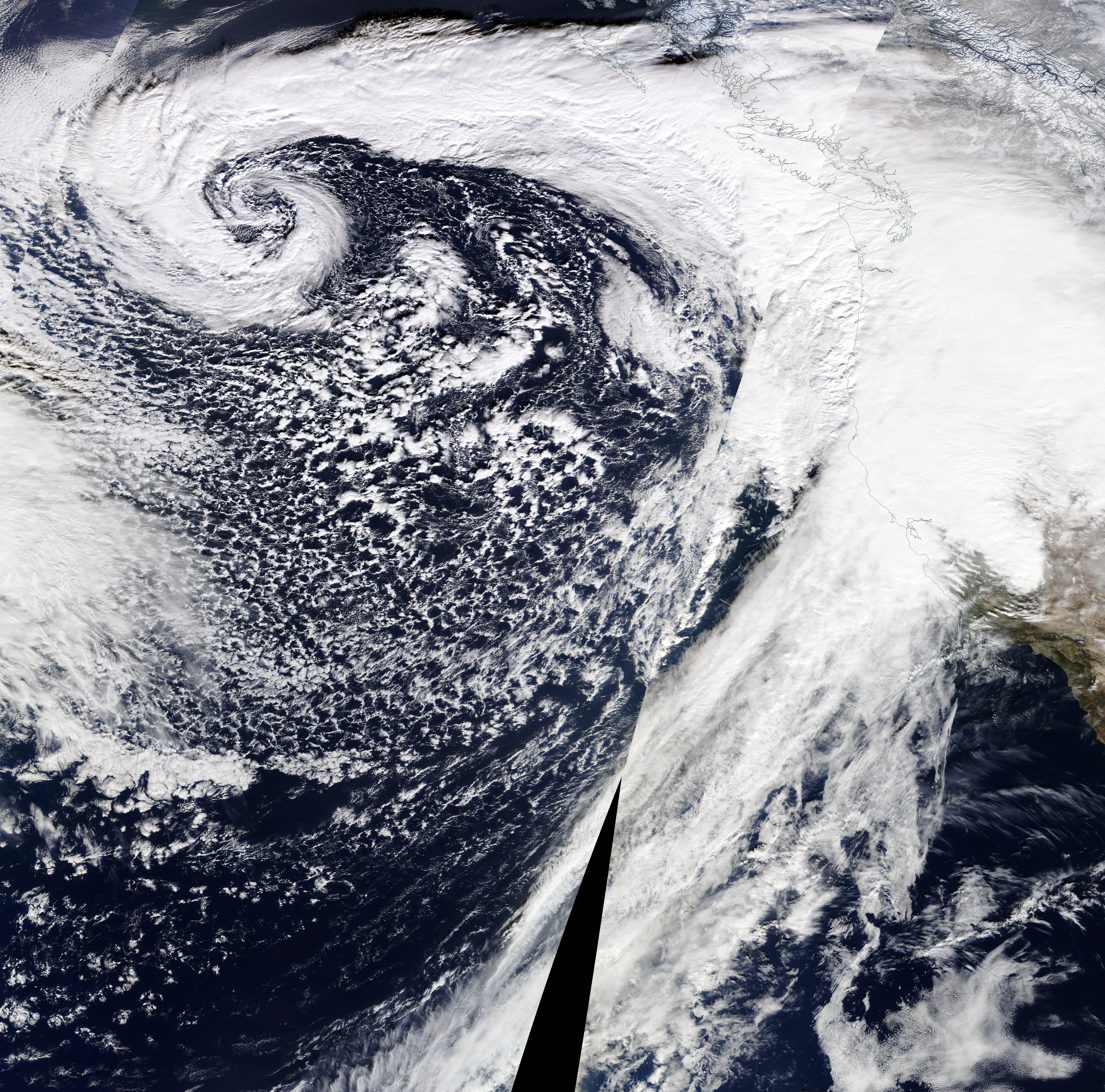
Satellite images of one of the first extratropical cyclones responsible for the flooding (unofficially named "Winter Storm Iras" by The Weather Channel).

The high-amplitude ridge off the West Coast that characterized the 2011–17 California drought, dubbed the "Ridiculously Resilient Ridge", was replaced by a persistent presence of anomalous troughs affected California. Another feature in the 2013–2015 winters was the extreme temperature contrast between a warm western U.S. and a cold eastern continent. These anomalous temperature and circulation patterns were referred to as the North American winter “dipole”. The dipole basically describes the wintertime stationary waves over North America, which contribute to the mean temperature difference between the climatologically warmer western U.S. and colder eastern half. Therefore, an amplification of the stationary wave would enhance such a temperature difference, like in the 2013-2015 winters, while a weakening of the stationary wave would reverse the situation, like in the 2016–2017 winter. Indeed, in winter 2016–2017 this dipole was apparently reversed.

== Effects ==
=== Northern California ===
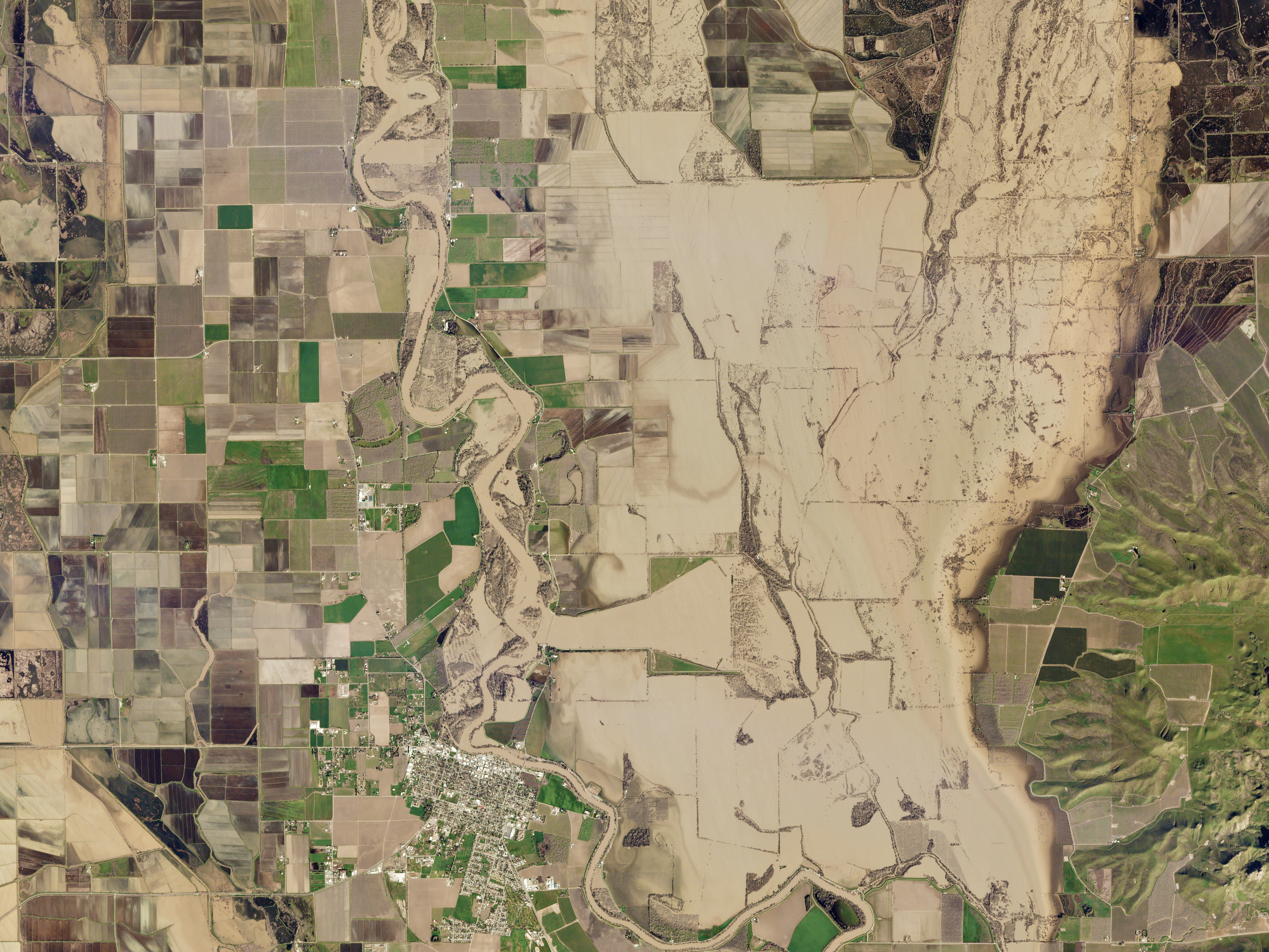
Flooding inundates farmland along the Sacramento River outside Colusa, on February 11

In early January 2017, the Russian River in Sonoma and Mendocino Counties rose 3 feet (0.91 m) above flood stage, inundating about 500 houses. More than 570,000 customers of the Pacific Gas and Electric Company lost power in Northern and Central California during the event. More than 3,000 people in the Guerneville area were evacuated. The community of Forestville and the nearby Laguna de Santa Rosa flooded, blocking roads and agricultural lands. Flooding in the Russian River valley inundated vineyards, causing millions of dollars in crop damage.

The American River east of Sacramento reached record flows, although property damage was limited by the protection provided by Folsom Dam. The maximum flood release of 70,000 cubic feet per second (2,000 m^{3}/s) was the highest since 1997. The popular recreation areas at the American River Parkway and Discovery Park were flooded for four months.

On the early morning of February 18, flash flooding on Stone Corral Creek flooded the town of Maxwell in Colusa County. More than 100 residents had to be evacuated by boat after water filled the streets.

Floods and mudslides closed roads in numerous areas in Northern California. Both directions of U.S. Route 395 was temporarily closed in Mono County.

==== San Francisco Bay Area ====
Anderson Dam in Morgan Hill overflowed in February for the first time in 11 years. The resulting flooding along Coyote Creek forced the evacuation of 14,000 people in San Jose and caused $73 million in damage. City workers reportedly tried to warn authorities of the flooding risk as much as a day before the river burst its banks, but it remains unclear why evacuations were not ordered until the flooding actually began.

The Puerto Suello Hill Tunnel along the Sonoma–Marin Area Rail Transit line was partially damaged by mudslides; this delayed pre-revenue testing of the system for three weeks.

==== Oroville Dam spillway failures ====
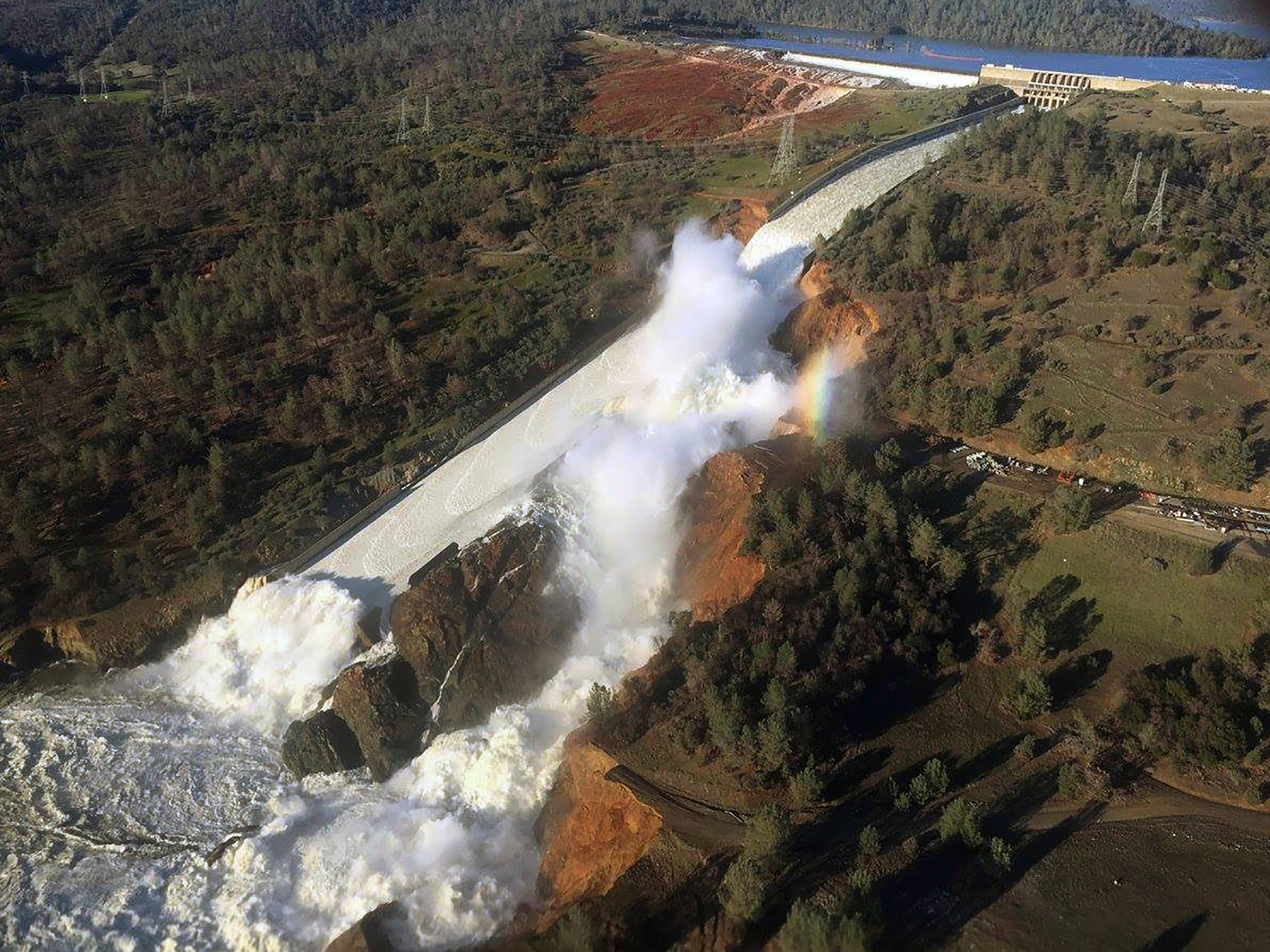
View of Oroville Dam's main spillway (center) and emergency spillway (top), February 11, 2017. The large gully to the right of the main spillway was caused by water flowing through its damaged concrete surface.

On February 7, heavy flows damaged the spillway of Oroville Dam in Butte County. However, due to heavy storm runoff into Lake Oroville, dam operators were forced to continue using the concrete spillway, eventually destroying the lower half of the chute. The reservoir rose so quickly that it overtopped the emergency spillway, which had never been tested for safety, and threatened to undermine it. More than 188,000 people in the Feather River valley were evacuated as officials feared the collapse of the emergency spillway, which could have sent a 30-foot (9 m) wall of water into the Feather River below and flooded communities downstream.

High water flows in the Feather River caused considerable damage, collapsing the river banks and destroying large areas of farmland. The Feather River Fish Hatchery was flooded with turbid water, and several million juvenile salmon had to be evacuated from the facility.

The estimated cost to repair Oroville Dam is $400 million. As of September 2018, the actual cost of repairs had risen to $1.1 billion.

=== Central California ===
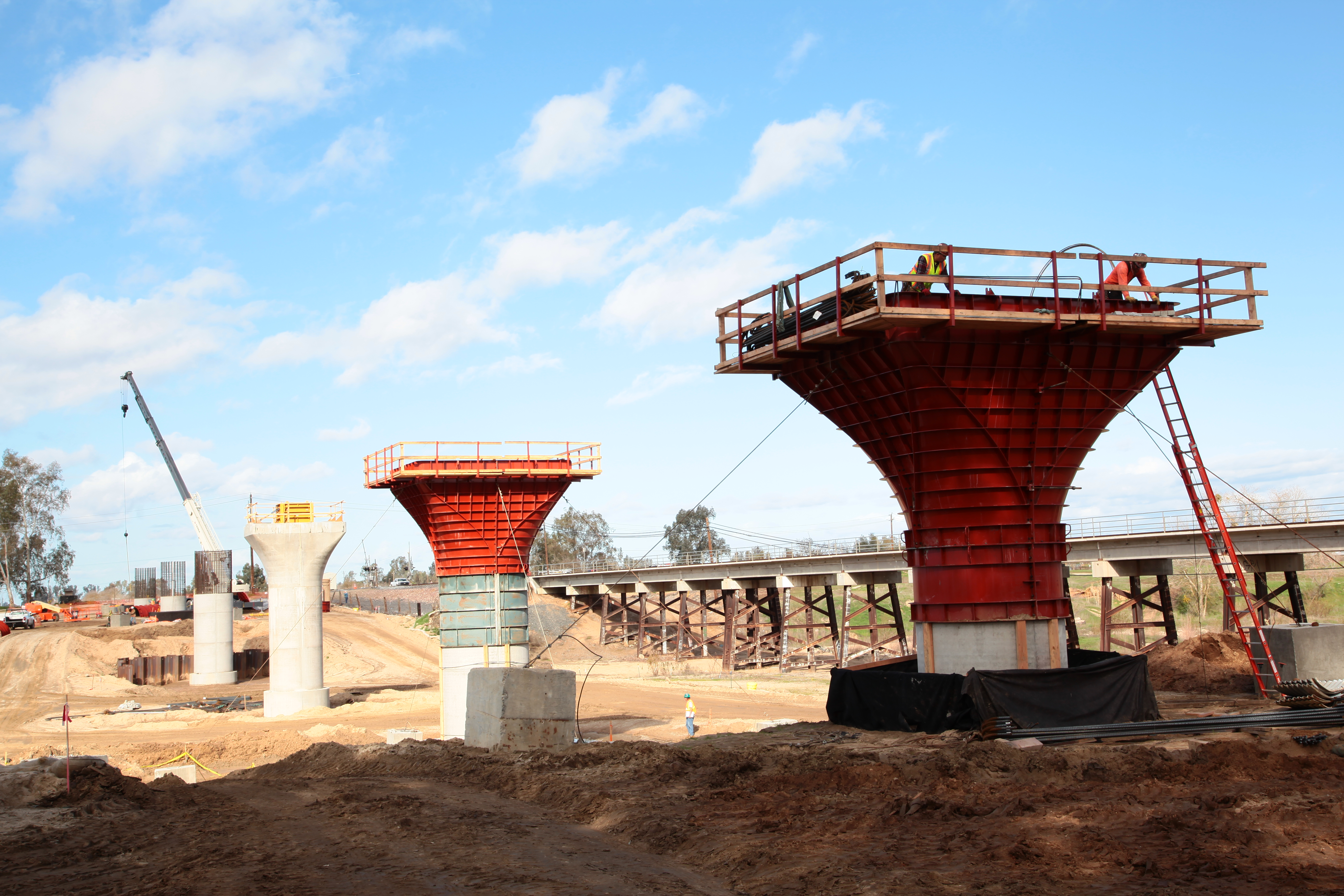
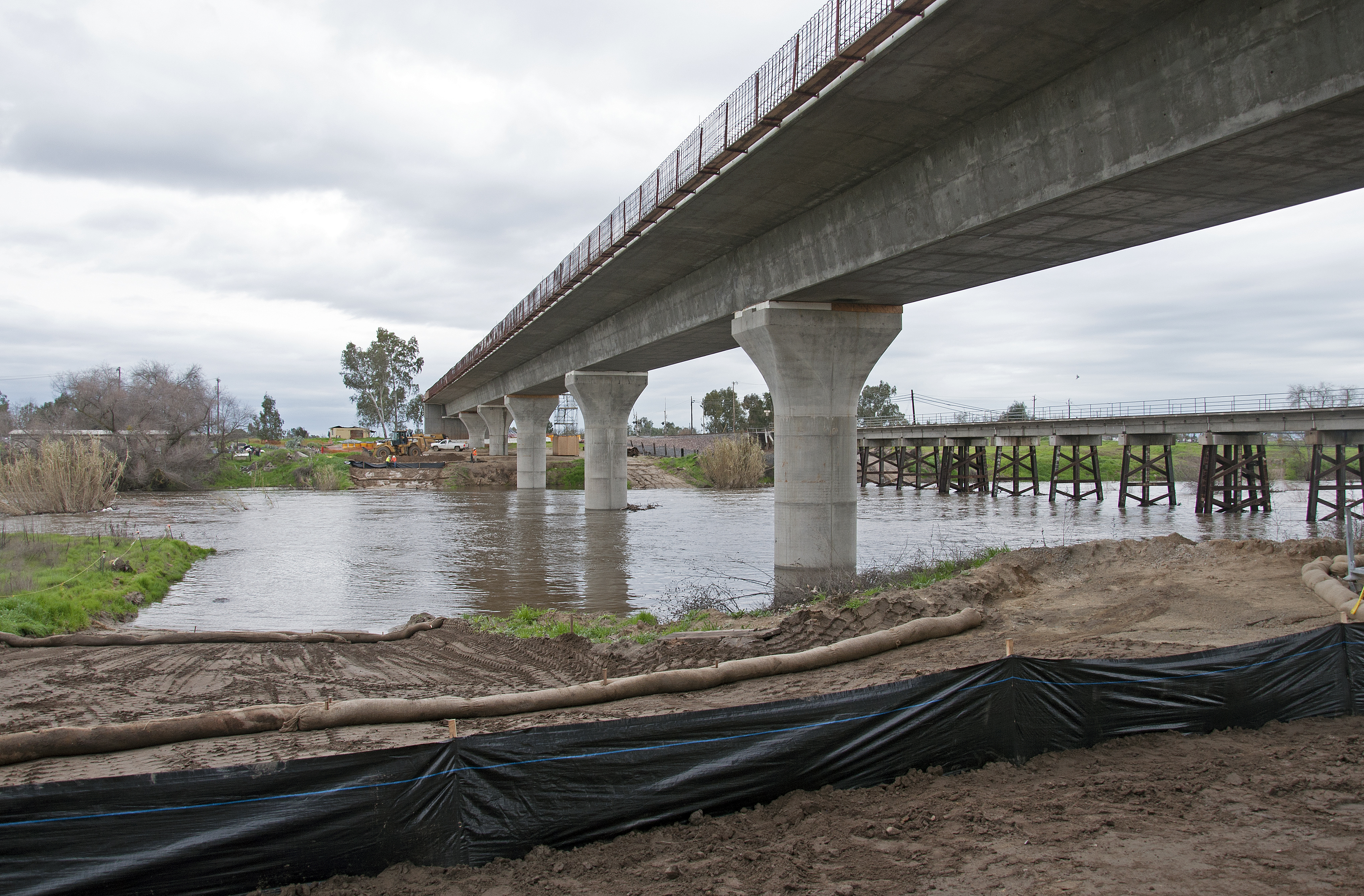
The Fresno River is normally dry at the site of the Fresno River Viaduct, shown under construction in January 2016 (top). In February 2017, the floods caused the river to fill with water (bottom).

The San Joaquin River reached its highest levels since 1997, due to the opening of upstream dams to manage flooding, and flood stage was exceeded along portions of the river. On February 20, a levee breached near Manteca, and 500 people were evacuated, though the damage was quickly repaired. Increased flow to the Fresno River, which is normally dry, and the San Joaquin River delayed construction on parts of California High-Speed Rail's Fresno River Viaduct and San Joaquin River Viaduct.

Multiple landslides and bridge collapses in the Big Sur area closed a long stretch of the Pacific Coast Highway, isolating coastal communities. The road is expected to reopen north of Big Sur by September, but a massive landslide about 30 miles (48 km) south of Big Sur may take over a year to clear.

The Pioneer Cabin Tree, a giant sequoia in Calaveras Big Trees State Park, known since 1880 for its human-made "tunnel" that hikers could pass through, was toppled by one of the storms on January 9.

=== Southern California ===
Southern California was not as heavily hit as the north; however, storms during February 16–19 were the strongest in seven years. Five people drowned in the Greater Los Angeles urban area as heavy rainfall flooded highways, created sinkholes and cut power to 110,000 households. In Sun Valley water across Interstate 5 was more than 2 1/2 feet deep, trapping motorists in their cars. In Orange County, three people were safely rescued from the Santa Ana River, while in Thousand Oaks one man drowned and three others were injured in a flash flood in Arroyo Conejo Creek.

In the Santa Barbara area, flooding closed major roads including Highway 101 and led to debris flows in recently burned areas. Rural mountain communities near Goleta and Solvang were evacuated. The flooding also partially refilled Lake Cachuma, an important local water source which had essentially dried up in the preceding drought.

== Other effects ==
=== Dams, reservoirs, and lakes ===
Dams were opened to relieve pressure from built-up floodwaters, with the Sacramento Weir on the Sacramento River being opened for the first time in eleven years. The spillways at Shasta Dam on the Sacramento River and New Don Pedro Dam on the Tuolumne River were also opened for the first time since 1997. Overflow from the Sacramento River inundated the huge floodplain of the Yolo Bypass; peak flow through the bypass reached more than 200,000 cubic feet per second (5,700 m^{3}/s).

The flooding filled multiple major reservoirs to capacity which had been previously at low levels from the drought. New Melones Lake, only about a quarter full in late 2016, reached almost 90 percent by early June 2017. Lake Berryessa also filled for the first time since 2006, causing water to overflow into the "Glory Hole" spillway at Monticello Dam. In Kern County, Lake Isabella hit its maximum allowed capacity for the first time in six years and putting stress on the structurally inadequate Isabella Dam.

On the eastern slope of the Sierra Nevada, Lake Tahoe received the most precipitation in 117 years of record-keeping, contributing to the fastest water level rise in the lake's history. Increased outflow from Lake Tahoe contributed to flooding along the Truckee River through Truckee and Reno, Nevada. Lake Tahoe and most of the Truckee reservoirs were filled by mid-July, a level not seen since 1997.

=== Summer flooding ===
Heavy winter storms resulted in the largest Sierra Nevada snowpack since 2011 and the seventh largest since 1950, reaching 164 percent of the normal seasonal peak. The extremely high snowpack continued to create hazardous conditions into summer as it melted. At least 14 people drowned in California rivers in May and June 2017.

In Bakersfield, the Kern River reached its highest summer levels since 1983. Over Memorial Day weekend three people drowned in the swift waters and 24 were rescued. In Yosemite National Park, the Merced River also hit dangerously high levels. On June 5, a man was swept away in the river; rangers were unable to recover his body.

=== Long-term effects ===
At the beginning of the next winter season, many reservoirs still remained at above-average levels, due to the storm rain and prolonged snowmelt from 2017. Some of the water had been used to replenish strained groundwater levels.

== See also ==
- 2016–17 North American winter
- January 2010 North American winter storms
- Floods in California
- Pineapple Express
- ARkStorm
- Water in California
- Droughts in California
- 2017 California wildfires
  - October 2017 Northern California wildfires
  - December 2017 Southern California wildfires
- 2018 Southern California mudflows
- 2022–2023 California floods
- 2016–17 South American floods
