= Kings River Viaduct =

Coordinates: 36.447105°N 119.622404°W

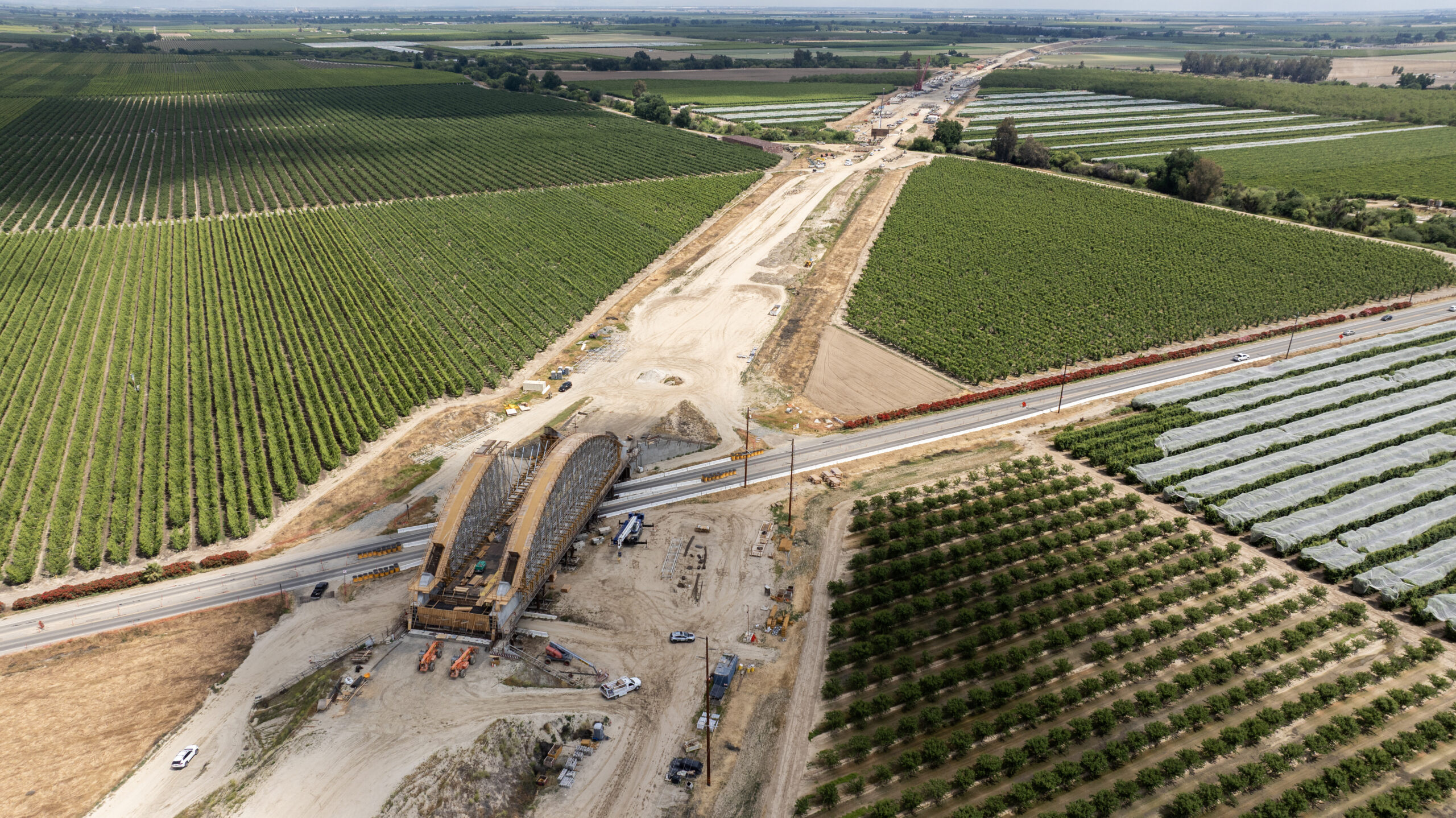
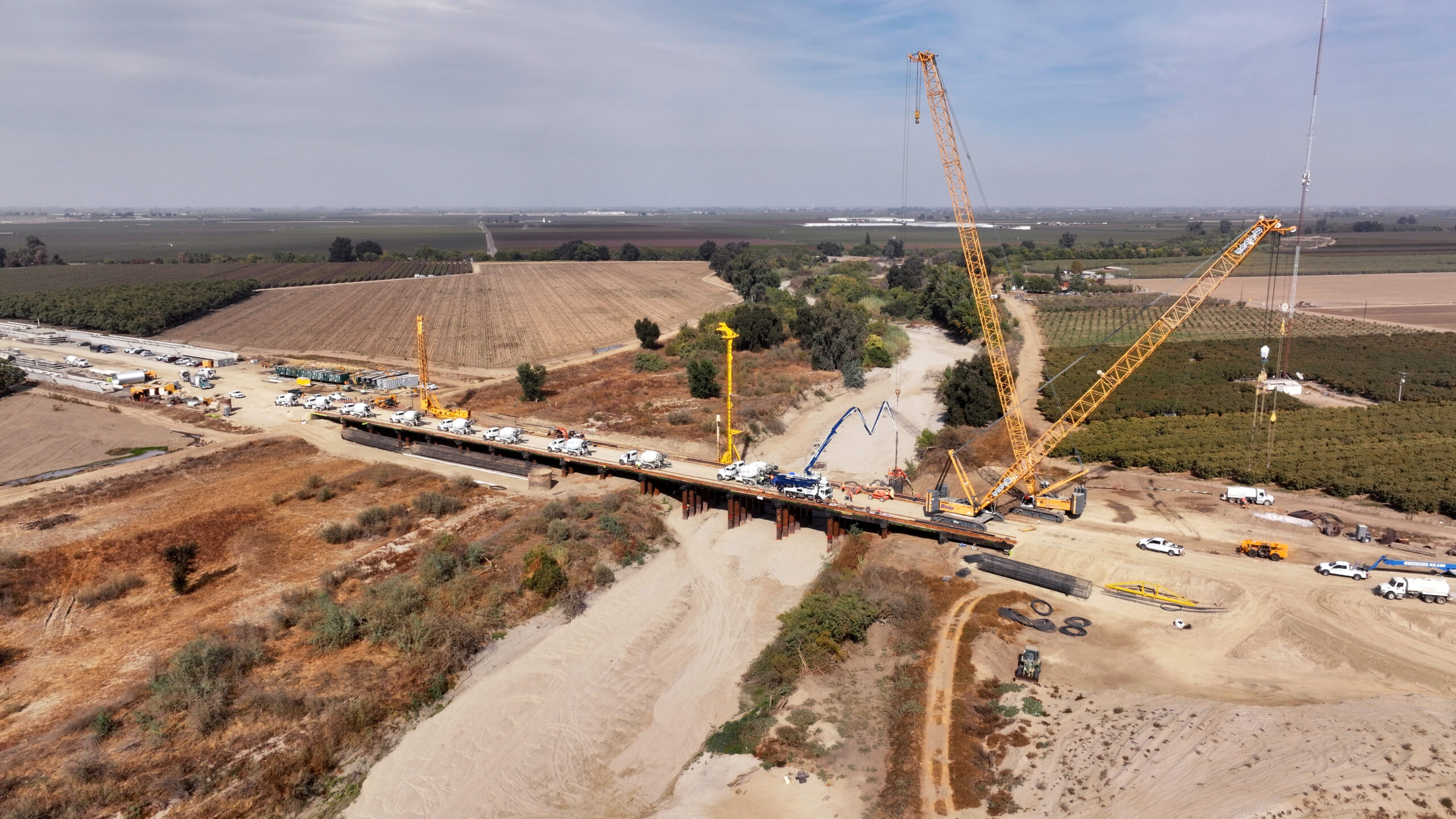
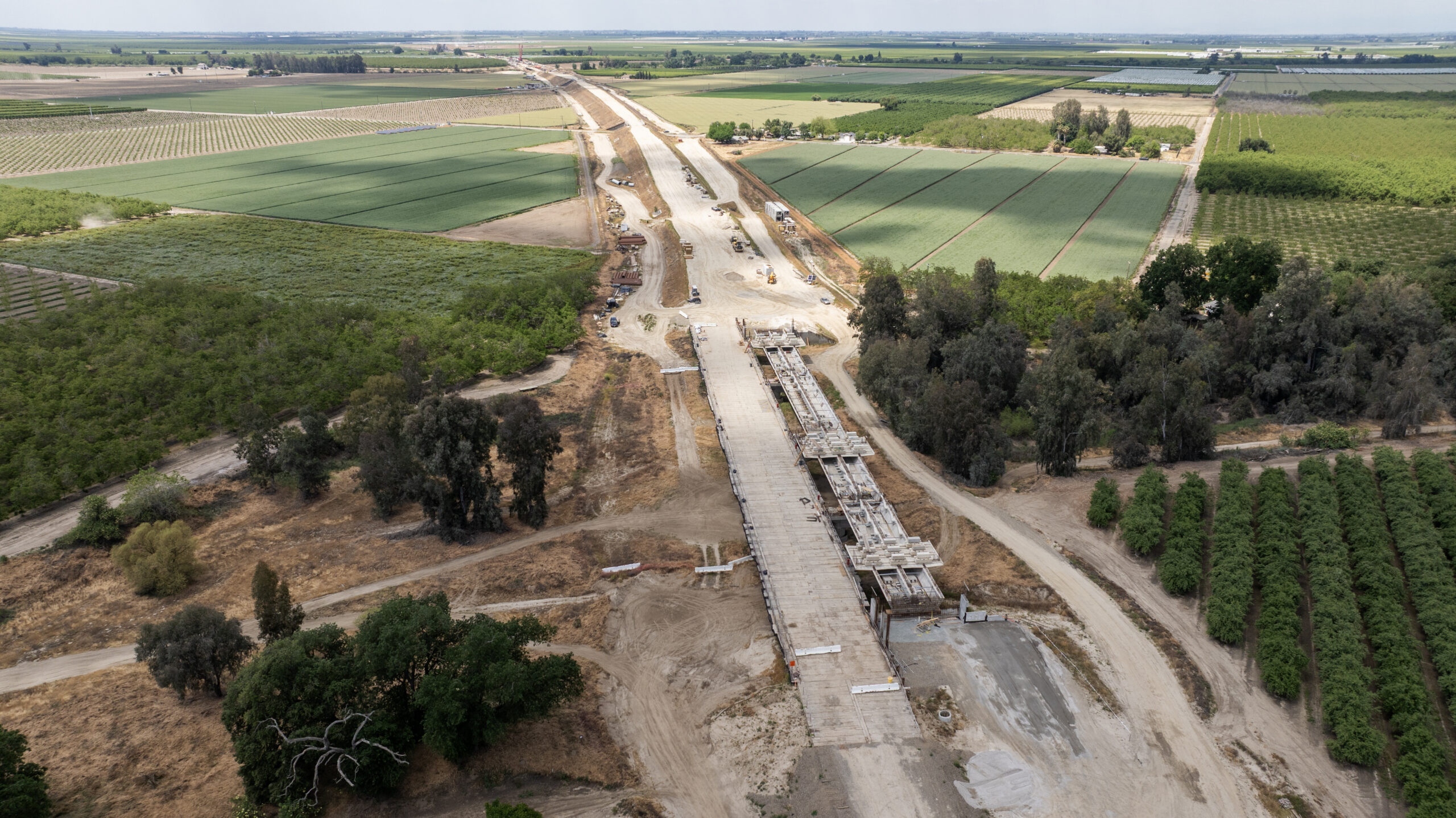
Construction of bridges over State Route 43 and Cole Slough (top), Dutch John Cut (middle), and the Old Kings River (bottom) in 2024 and 2025

The Kings River Viaduct is a planned series of bridges and embankments carrying California High-Speed Rail over the Kings River in Fresno County and Kings County, California. The site is between the Fresno and Kings–Tulare stations, roughly 4 miles (6.4 km) east of Laton and 8 miles (13 km) north of Hanford. The structure is planned to be over 2 miles (3.2 km) long because three river channels must be crossed, two of which were created by floods in the 1860s.

== Description ==
Planned route of California High-Speed Rail in the vicinity of the Kings River, in red

In the vicinity of the crossing, the Kings River consists of three widely separated river channels collectively known as the Kings River Complex. From north to south, these are Cole Slough, Dutch John Cut, and the Old Kings River, all of which flow in a westerly direction.

Cole Slough and the Old River separate at the People's Weir, the largest weir in the Kings River system. The Old River was the main course of the river until two floods in 1861 and 1867, the first of which created Cole Slough and the second of which caused it to become the river's new main course. Since then the Old River has been dry except when river flows are exceptionally high.

Dutch John Cut diverges from Cole Slough east of the bridge site, and joins the Old River to reform the main channel of the Kings River to the west of the bridge site. Cole Slough is then mostly diverted into several canals in the vicinity of Laton.

Dirt excavation sites in the vicinity of the bridge will be reused as groundwater recharge basins once construction is complete.

== History ==
The Kings River Viaduct is part of Construction Package 2–3, whose contract was awarded to Dragados/Flatiron/Shimmick in December 2014; the bid for the entire Construction Package was $1,234,567,890. The initial April 2014 plans called for an 11,680-foot-long concrete viaduct, with four truss bridge segments for the three river channels and Riverside Ditch. By 2016, during the bidding process the land portions were changed to embankments containing wildlife crossings, reducing the estimated cost by $79 million. At that time construction was expected to commence in spring 2017 and be completed in 2019.

In mid-2019, construction on the first portion of the bridge, the steel truss crossing of the Old Kings River, was scheduled to begin in September that year. However, in December 2019 the project continued to be delayed due to land acquisition, coordination with the Fish and Wildlife Service, utility relocation, and a lawsuit from a farmer owning land adjacent to the project.

As of mid-2020, the test pile foundation work was complete. Construction of the substructure was scheduled to begin in mid-October dependent on permit approvals.

By early 2024, bridges over Dutch John Cut and the Old Kings River were under construction.
