= San Joaquin River Viaduct =

Viaduct in Fresno County, California and Madera County, California

Coordinates: 36.844161°N 119.932481°W

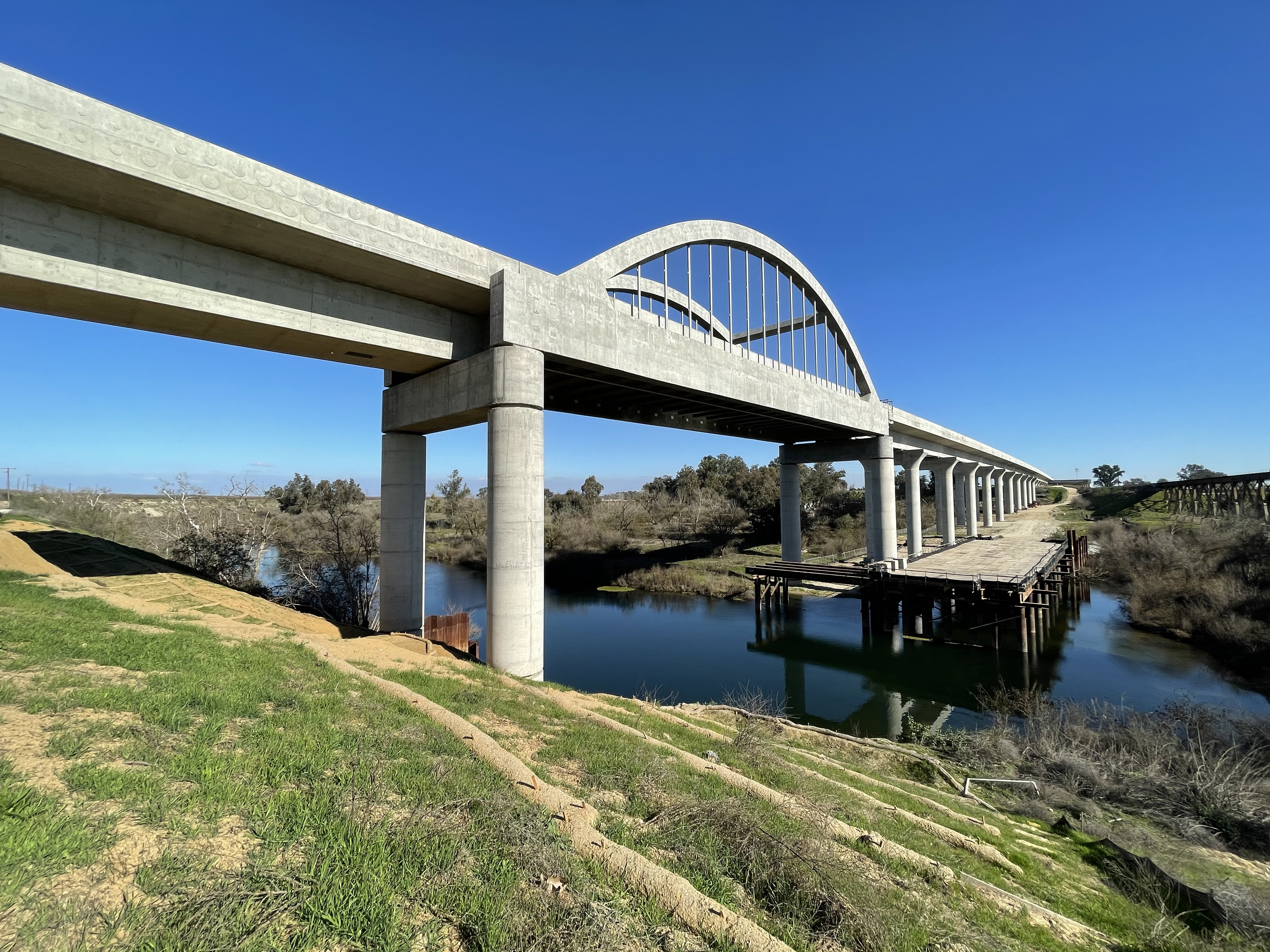
Completed main span in February 2021

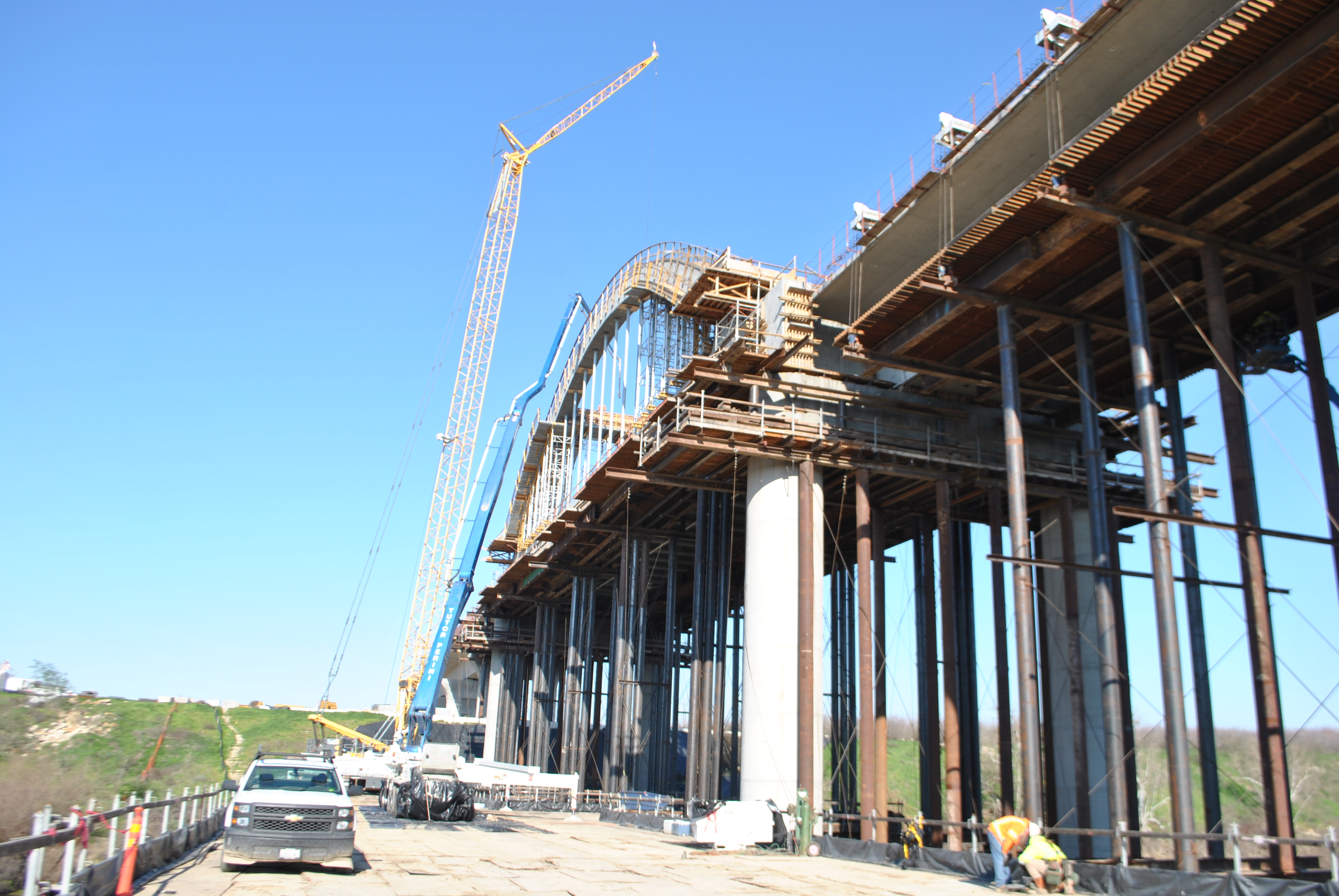
Construction of the main span in February 2020

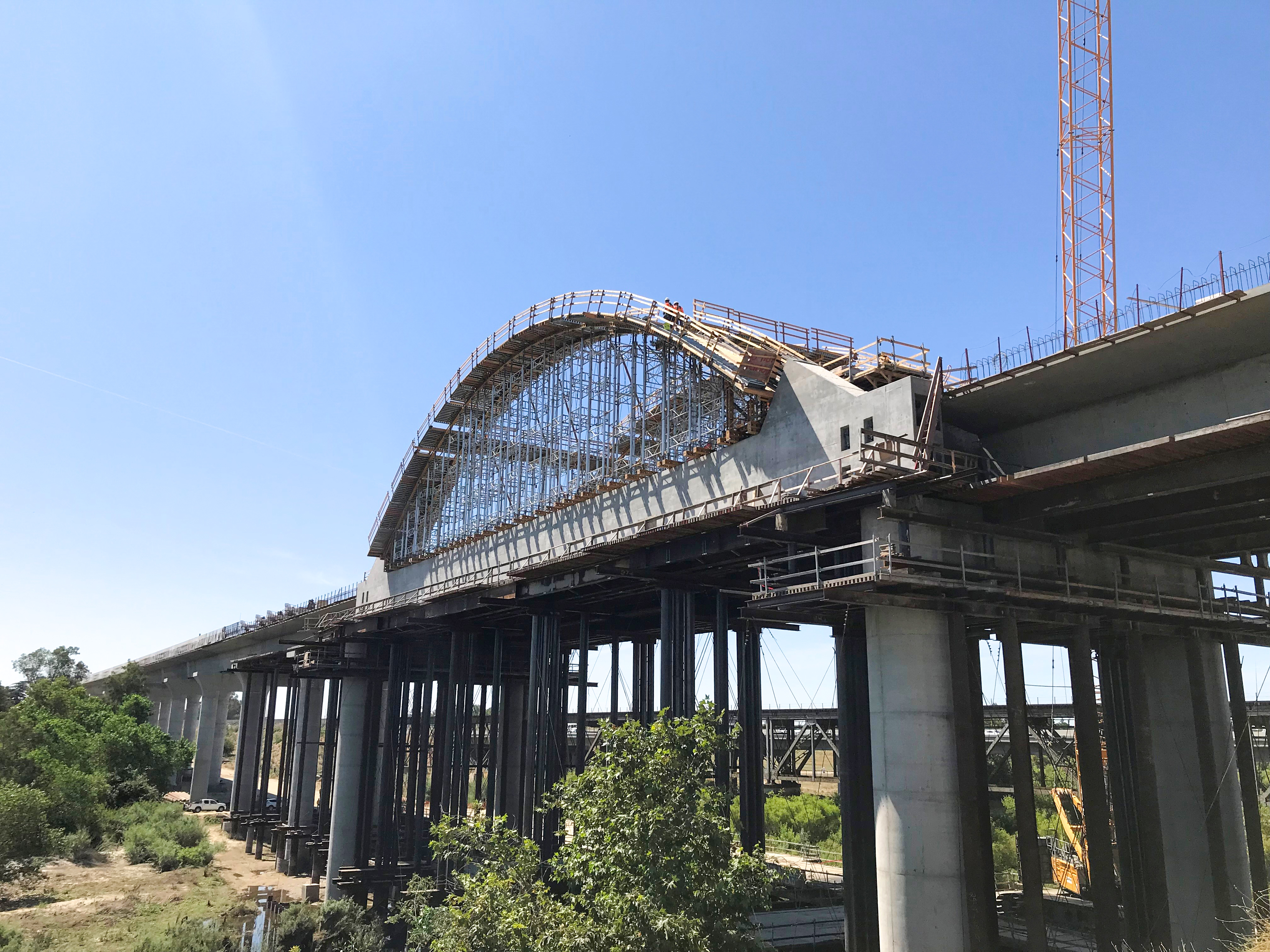
Construction of the main span in July 2019

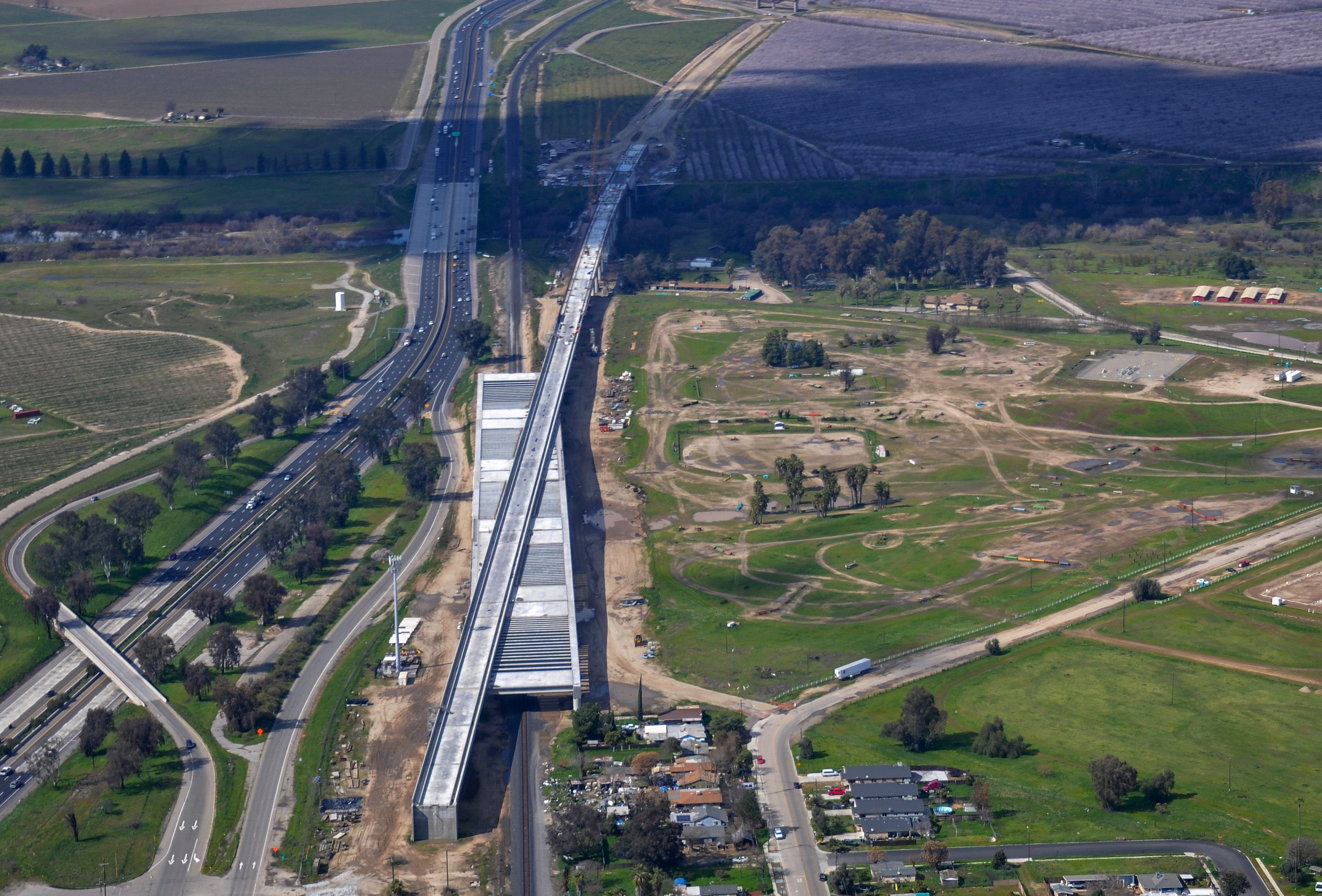
Construction of the pergola structure in February 2019

The San Joaquin River Viaduct is a bridge built to carry California High-Speed Rail over the San Joaquin River.

Most of the bridge is in the city of Fresno, California, in Fresno County, although the portion north of the center line of the river is in Madera County. It is the second major river crossing built for the high-speed rail line, after the Fresno River Viaduct to the north.

The 4,741-foot (1,445 m) bridge combines a double concrete arch span crossing the river with a pergola structure to carry the high-speed tracks over Union Pacific Railroad Fresno Subdivision tracks. The river crossing is immediately upstream of the Union Pacific and California State Route 99 bridges.

== History ==
In 2012, the City of Fresno recommended building a through arch bridge with return arches to transition gracefully to the flanking box girder bridge segments and make it more visually appealing. However, conceptual drawings in 2016 showed a different arch structure that lacked the return arches.

The bridge is part of CAHSR's Construction Package 1, the contract for which was awarded in August 2013. Preliminary statnamic load testing on the riverbed occurred in February 2015 to test the stability of the bridge foundation in an earthquake. Construction began in April 2016, and was expected to take two to three years.

By February 2019, crews were working over the San Joaquin River and making final preparations before placing concrete at the east archway of the viaduct. The concrete placement was while crews continued forming up the west archway and building an additional scaffold. These arches act as a suspension bridge support for the bridge span over the river. The bridge was deemed completed in May 2021.
