= Flatiron Dragados =

American heavy civil infrastructure contractor

- Formerly: Flatiron Structures Company LLC (1972–2002); HBG Flatiron (2002–2004); Flatiron Construction Corporation (2007–2024)
- Type: Subsidiary
- Industry: Construction, Civil Engineering
- Founded: 1947
- Headquarters: Atlanta, Georgia, U.S.
- Parent: ACS Group (61.8%); Hochtief (38.2%)
- Subsidiaries: Prince Contracting; Pulice Construction; SPC Construction; JF White Contracting

Flatiron Dragados, previously Flatiron Construction Corporation and HBG Flatiron, is an American heavy civil infrastructure contractor headquartered in Broomfield, Colorado, and a subsidiary of Hochtief.

Flatiron builds infrastructure such as bridges, highways, railways, roads, tunnels, hydropower facilities and oil along with gas and industrial infrastructure for the transportation, energy and water sectors. They specialize in large-scale infrastructure projects. The company conducts projects through contracting methods such as design-build and public-private partnerships.

== History ==
Named after the flatiron rock formations found near Boulder, Colorado, Flatiron was originally a small materials company. Flatiron Structures Company LLC was founded in 1972 as it expanded into heavy construction. In the late 1980s, the company conducted work along Interstate 70 (I-70) through the Glenwood Canyon Corridor in Colorado.

Flatiron opened two regional offices in California in the 1990s. In 1997, Flatiron worked on the first design-build bridge project in Maine, the Sagadahoc Bridge in Bath. In 1998, Flatiron secured a contract for the Eastern Toll Road project. From 1999 to 2004, Flatiron worked on projects in Florida, Texas, Louisiana, and the Carolinas, such as the Carolina Bays Parkway project.

Flatiron was acquired by Royal BAM Group in 2002 and was briefly renamed HBG Flatiron (2002 - 2004) as a result. BAM sold Flatiron to Germany-based Hochtief in 2007 for $243 million.

In 2005, Flatiron began working in Western Canada with their first public-private partnership project, the Park Bridge east of Golden, British Columbia. Other projects during the 2000s included the Carquinez Bridge project in 2007, the Port Mann Bridge/Highway 1 project in 2008, the I-35 W Saint Anthony Falls Bridge in 2008, and work in Utah in 2009.

Projects from the 2010s include Circle Drive in 2010, the John James Audubon Bridge over the Mississippi River, sections of the Anthony Henday Drive project in Edmonton, Alberta, the Lake Champlain Bridge connecting New York, Vermont and the Yadkin River Bridges in North Carolina. Flatiron has also worked on several contracts on the new eastern span of the San Francisco–Oakland Bay Bridge. Flatiron has been part of a team that has bid on construction packages for the California High-Speed rail and won a contract that was announced on December 12, 2014.

Dragados/Flatiron/Shimmick submitted a bid of $1.23 billion to design and build the 65-mile stretch from the south end of Fresno to near the Tulare-Kings County Line and was deemed the “apparent best value” bidder by the California High-Speed Rail Authority.

As of 2013, Flatiron operated across the U.S. and Canada, with more than 2,000 employees and 12 regional offices. Flatiron also works in heavy civil construction in the northeast via E.E. Cruz and Company. The company is a subsidiary of Flatiron and Turner Construction.

In 2011, Spain-based ACS Group acquired a controlling interest in Flatiron's parent company Hochtief.

On 30 July 2024, ACS and Hochtief announced that Dragados North America and Dragados Canada would be integrated with Flatiron. The new entity Flatiron Dragados would be held 61.8% by ACS and 38.2% by Hochtief.
