= ACS Group =

Spanish company dedicated to civil and engineering construction

ACS, Actividades de Construcción y Servicios, S.A.

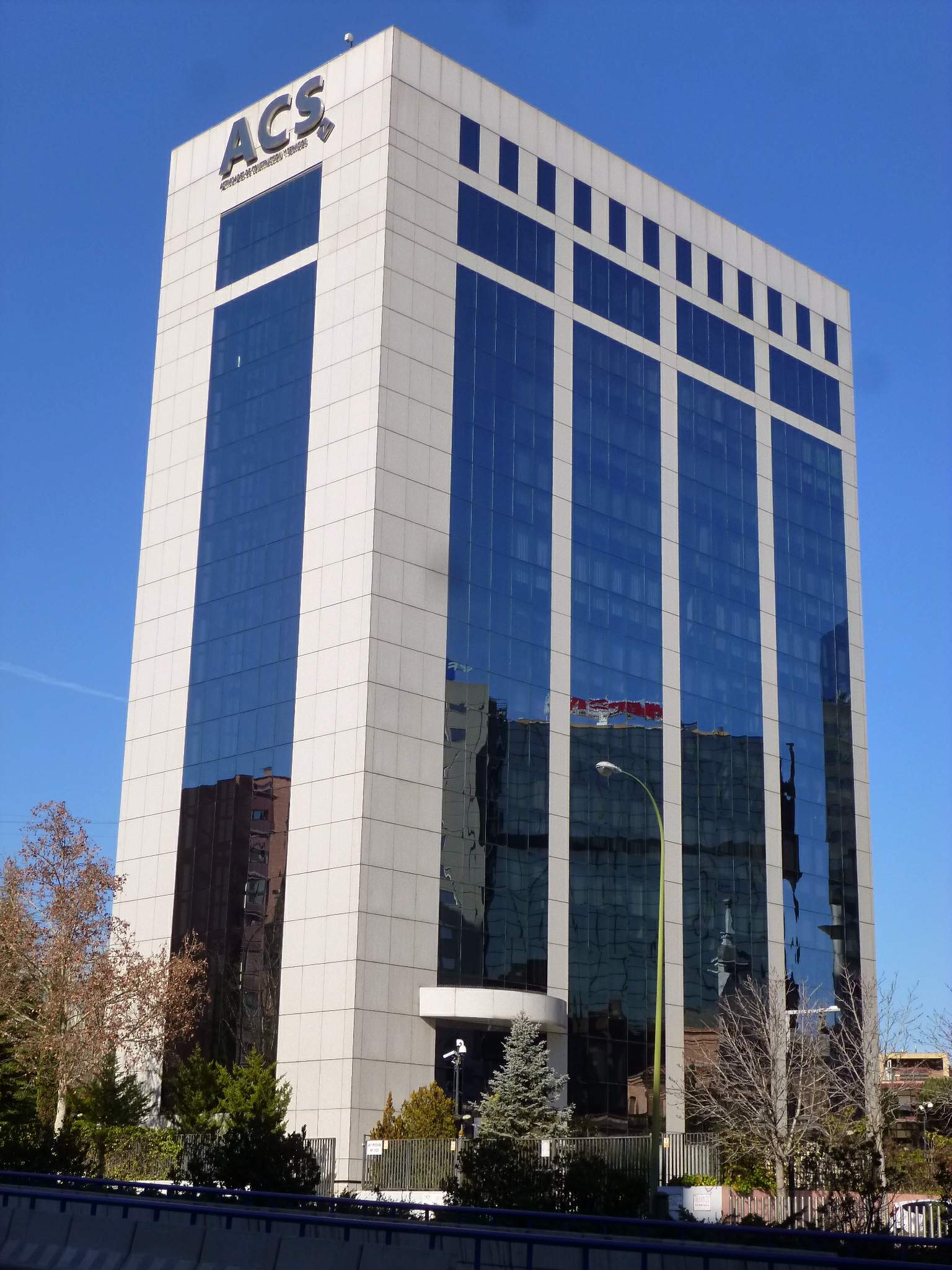
- Headquarters in Madrid, Spain
- Type: Public
- Traded as: BMAD: ACS
- ISIN: ES0167050915
- Industry: Civil engineering
- Founded: 1997; 29 years ago, in Madrid, Spain
- Headquarters: Avenida de Pío XII 102, Madrid, Spain
- Key people: Florentino Pérez (chairman)
- Services: Public works, residential and non-residential construction, transport infrastructure concessions, facility management, environmental services, logistics, industrial services
- Revenue: ▼€41.6 billion (2024)
- Operating income: ▲€1.59 billion (2024)
- Net income: ▲€828 million (2024)
- Total assets: ▲€42.0 billion (2024)
- Total equity: ▼€5.12 billion (2024)
- Owner: Florentino Pérez (12.5%); CriteriaCaixa (9.4%)
- Number of employees: 157,284 (2024)
- Website: grupoacs.com

ACS, Actividades de Construcción y Servicios, S.A. (Spanish pronunciation: [aθeˈese]) is a Spanish company dedicated to civil engineering, construction, all types of services and telecommunications. It is one of the leading construction companies in the world, with projects in many countries around the world. The company was founded in 1997 through the merger of OCP Construcciones, S.A. and Ginés Navarro Construcciones, S.A. The group has a presence in the United States, Germany, India, Brazil, Chile, Morocco and Australia. The headquarters are in Madrid and the chairperson is Florentino Pérez. Listed on the Bolsa de Madrid, the company's shares form part of the IBEX 35 stock market index.

== History ==
The company was formed when a team of engineers acquired Construcciones Padrós S.A., a construction business which had been in financial difficulty, in 1983. The company acquired a majority holding in Cobra, a support services business, and merged with OCISA S.A. to create OCP Construcciones, S.A. In 1993, it went on to merge with Ginés Navarro Construcciones, S.A. to create Grupo ACS in 1997. It subsequently bought Onyx SCL, an environmental contractor in 1999 and stakes in Xfera and Broadnet, telecommunications businesses in 2000 before going on to acquire Dragados S.A., a large contractor established during the Second World War to dredge the Port of Tarifa and which had subsequently gained extensive experience in hydro-electric and civil engineering work, in 2003.

During 2005, ACS entered the US market via the establishment of Dragados USA, a wholly owned subsidiary of Dragados S.A. One of the first undertakings of the newly formed branch was a successful bid for the New York City's Metropolitan Transportation Authority (MTA) East Side Access Manhattan Tunnels project, being awarded an initial contract valued at $428 million. In April 2008, the MTA awarded another contract, valued at $506 million, to the company. Separate undertakings by the company included the Harbor Bridge Project, and the Maryland's Purple Line.

During 2006, the company acquired 22.0% of the Spanish utility company Unión Fenosa; its stake in the business was subsequently increased to 45%. Two years later, ACS Group opted to divest its stake to Gas Natural.

In September 2010, ACS Group issued an offer to purchase a controlling stake in German rival Hochtief; the latter mounted an unsuccessful challenge to this approach. During April 2011, the firm raised its stake in Hochtief to 50.16%, effectively acquiring the company.

During 2017, the company participated in a bidding war to acquire the toll road management business Abertis. In October 2018, ACS Group joined with the Italian holding firm Atlantia to undertake a 16.5 billion euro ($19 billion) acquisition of Abertis as part of its ambition to build the world's largest toll road group; the transaction was approved by the European Commission. Two years later, under the company's strategy of continuous rotation of mature assets to generate resources for new projects, ACS Group sold a 74% stake in a batch of six tranches of ‘shadow toll’ highways in Spain to Hermes for €950 million.

In October 2020, ACS Group announced that it had received a €5.2 billion ($6.08 billion) bid from the French infrastructure group Vinci SA for its ACS Industrial division; this transaction was completed during the following year. Additional arrangements between the two companies led to the creation of a joint venture focused on the renewable energy sector.

During 2021, ACS Group conducted an internal review to simplify its structure and allegedly considered spinning out its construction business; around this time, the company was focused on increasing its toll road division within the European market. In April of that year, it made an approach to purchase Atlantia's 88% stake in motorway division Autostrade per l'Italia, which valued the business at 9 billion-10 billion euros ($10.7 billion-$11.9 billion). In September 2022, Atlantia sold its 14.46% stake in Hochtief to ACS Group in exchange for 577.8 million euros ($576.9 million).

In July 2022, the company was fined €57.1 million, along with five other contractors, by the Comisión Nacional de los Mercados y la Competencia (CNMC) for bidding collusion in public tenders for building and civil infrastructure works.

On 30 July 2024, ACS Group and Hochtief announced that Dragados North America would be integrated with Flatiron. The combined company, Flatiron Dragados, would be held 61.8% by ACS and 38.2% by Hochtief. That same year, ACS Group reported that it had achieved better than expected results, which was largely attributed to its construction portfolio in the United States and Australia, particularly its toll road interests.

== Divisions ==
=== Construction ===
- Dragados North America
  - Dragados USA
    - Pulice
    - John P. Picone Inc
    - Schiavone Construction Co. LLC
    - Prince Contracting
    - J.F. White Contracting Co.
  - Dragados Canada
- VYCSA
- Roura & Cevasa
- Electren
- Constru-Rail
- Edileuropa Di Stivaletti Michele
- TECSA
- Drace
- Dravosa
- GEOCISA
- COGESA
- Dycvensa
- Dycasa
- Pol-Aqua
- Hochtief (79.1%)
  - Turner
    - Clark Builders
    - Tompkins Builders
    - Dornan Engineering
  - Flatiron
    - E.E. Cruz and Company
  - CIMIC Group
    - Sedgman
    - CPB Contractors
    - Leighton Asia
    - Thiess
    - UGL
    - Ventia

=== Infrastructure ===
- Iridium Concesiones de Infraestructuras

=== Industrial companies ===
- Grupo Cobra
- Grupo Etra
- Etra air
- SEMI S.A.
- IMESAPI
- EYRA
- CYMI
- Dragados OFFSHORE
- GRUPO MAESSA
- Maetel
- Grupo MAESSA Arabia Saudi Ltd
- Intecsa Industrial
- Initec Energía
- SICE

=== Services ===
- Clece
- Dragados SPL
- Continental-Rail

=== Minority Investments ===
- Abertis (25%)
- Urbis

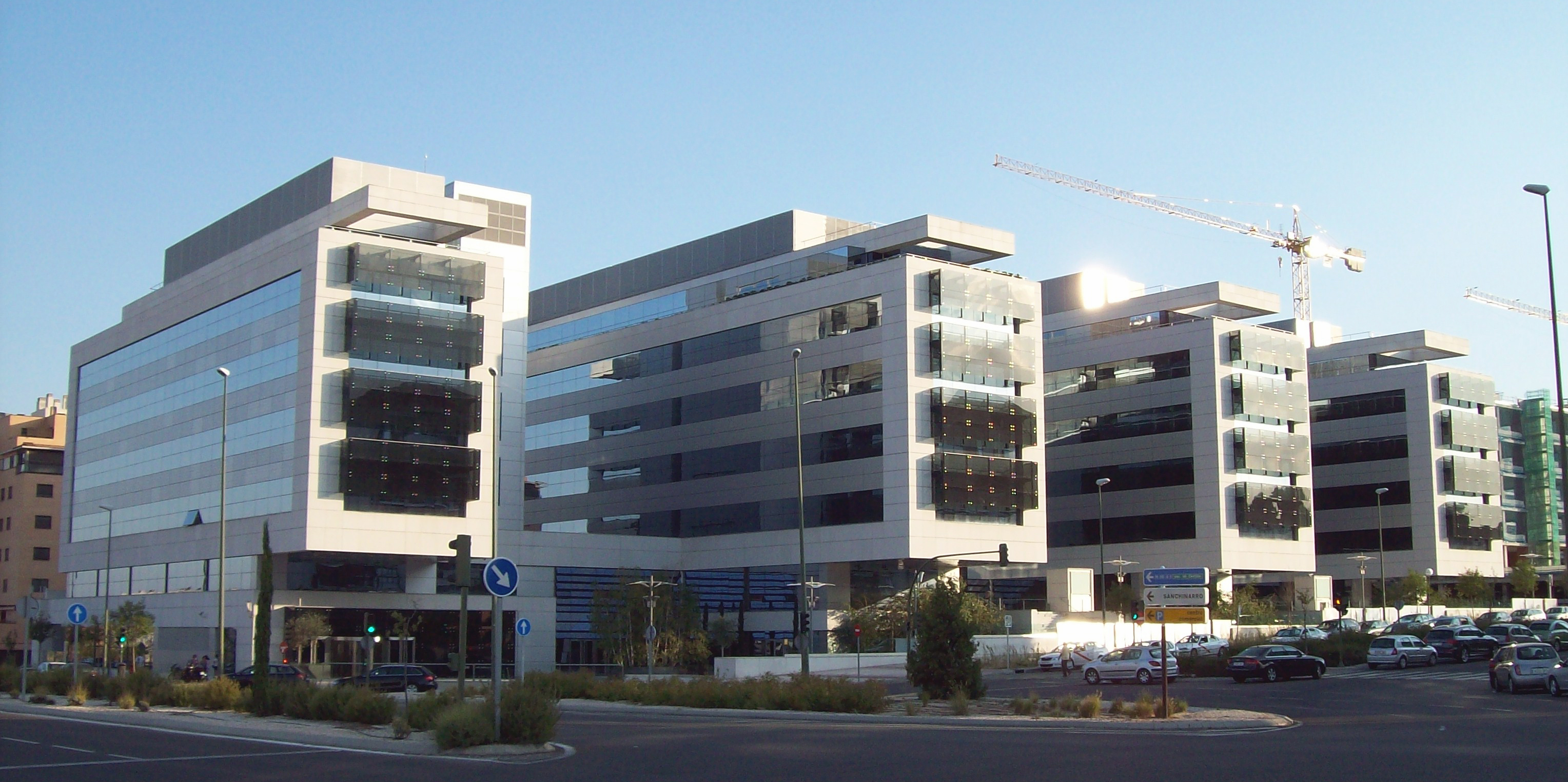
Head offices of Dragados (Madrid), a construction company acquired by ACS in 2003

== Significant projects ==
Major projects involving the company have included:

- the Alqueva Dam completed in 2002
- the Palau de les Arts Reina Sofia completed in 2005
- the Torre Agbar completed in 2005
- the Torre de Cristal completed in 2008
- the Torre Caja Madrid completed in 2008
- the LGV Perpignan–Figueres High Speed railway completed in 2009
- the Portugués Dam in Ponce, Puerto Rico completed in 2014
- the Crescent Dunes Solar Energy Project completed in 2016
- the Crossrail Eastern Running Tunnels, completed in 2021
