= Fresno River Viaduct =

Rail bridge in Fresno, California, USA

Coordinates: 36.983069°N 120.029177°W

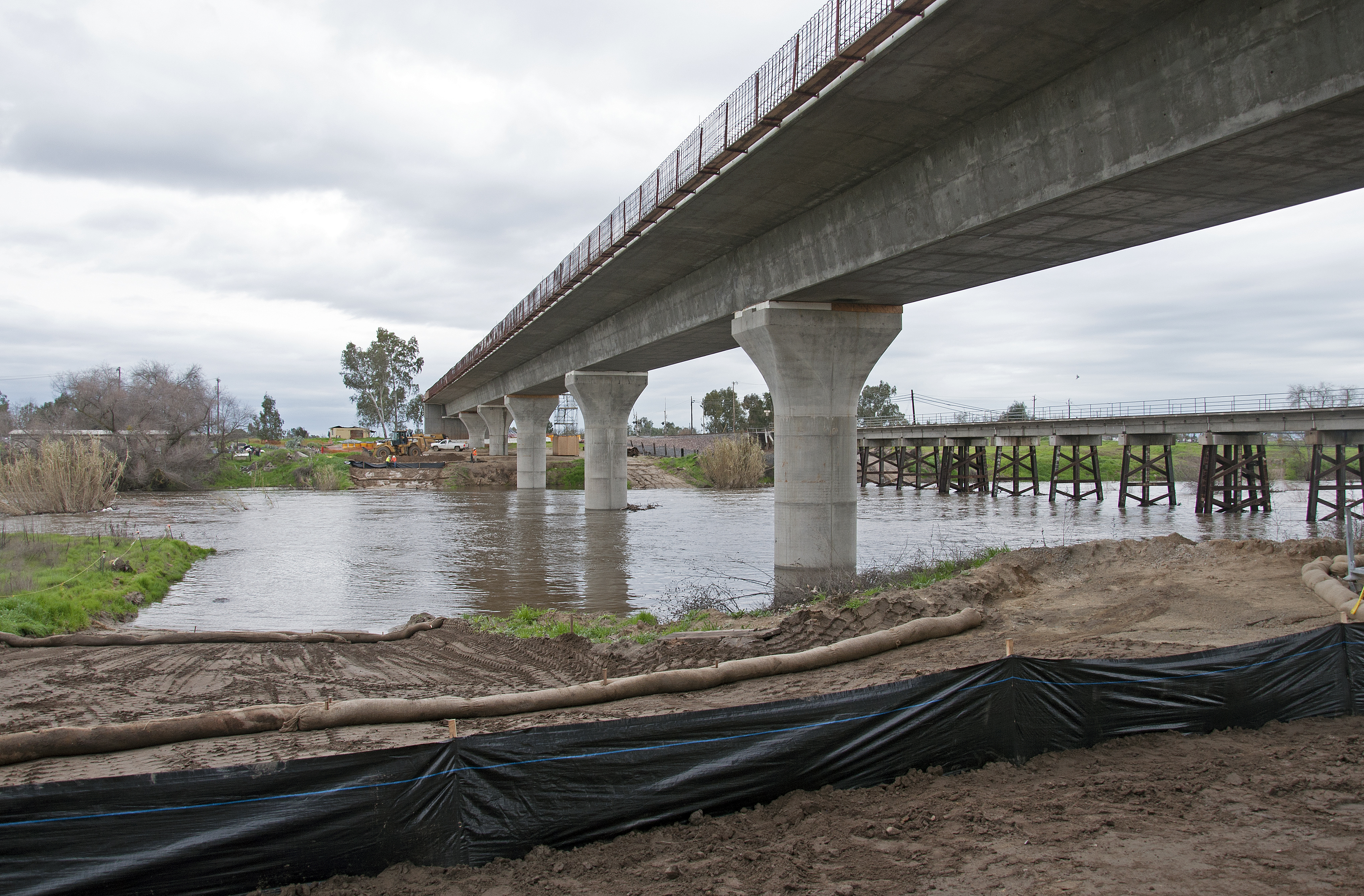
The Fresno River Viaduct near completion in February 2017

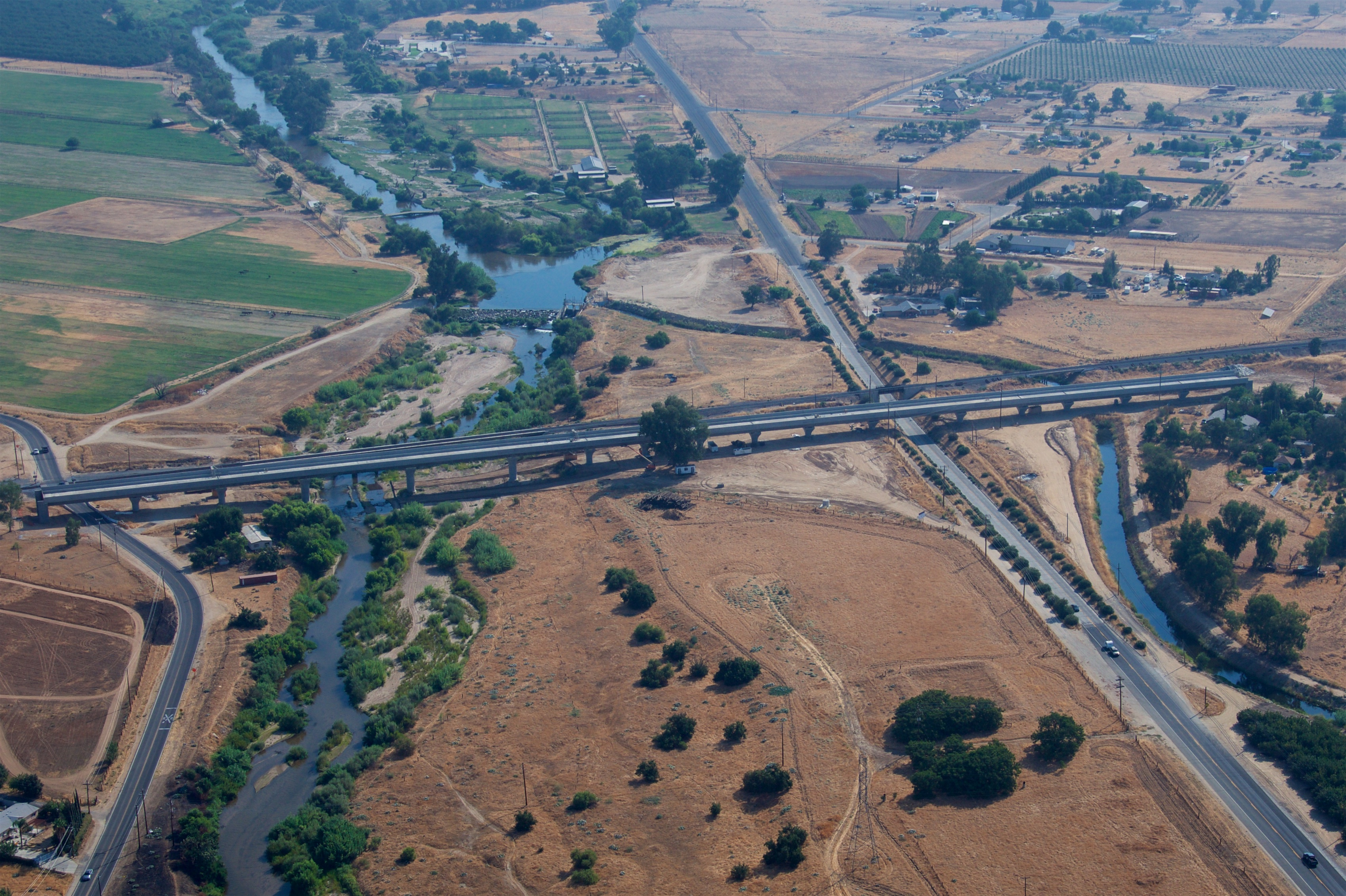
Aerial view of the viaduct near completion in August 2017

The Fresno River Viaduct is a bridge to carry California High-Speed Rail (CAHSR) over Route 145, the Fresno River, and Raymond Road in Madera County, California.

It was completed in 2018, the first permanent structure built for CAHSR. The site is just east of the city limits of Madera, California, about 20 miles northwest of the planned Fresno high-speed rail station and about 10 miles southeast of the planned Chowchilla Wye. Because the site is downstream from the John Franchi Diversion Dam, the riverbed is normally dry unless heavy rains cause the dam to overtop. The bridge is 1,600 feet long and 25 feet high, and runs parallel to the BNSF Railway bridge over the Fresno River.

== Construction ==
Construction began on June 16, 2015. Initial work consisted of assembling rebar cages for the bridge columns and pouring concrete. In August 2015, temporary cofferdams were erected to excavate sand to construct the bridge's structural supports. By the end of October 2015, the work on the piles had ended and the rebar skeletons of the 16 columns had been erected.

In late March 2016, concrete began to be poured for the bridge's superstructure. In October 2016, the final span of the bridge was being constructed and the rest of the deck was complete, with preparations commencing for installation of the deck's barrier wall.

A year later, in September 2017, the bridge's structure was largely complete, although track and electrical work remained for a future phase of construction.

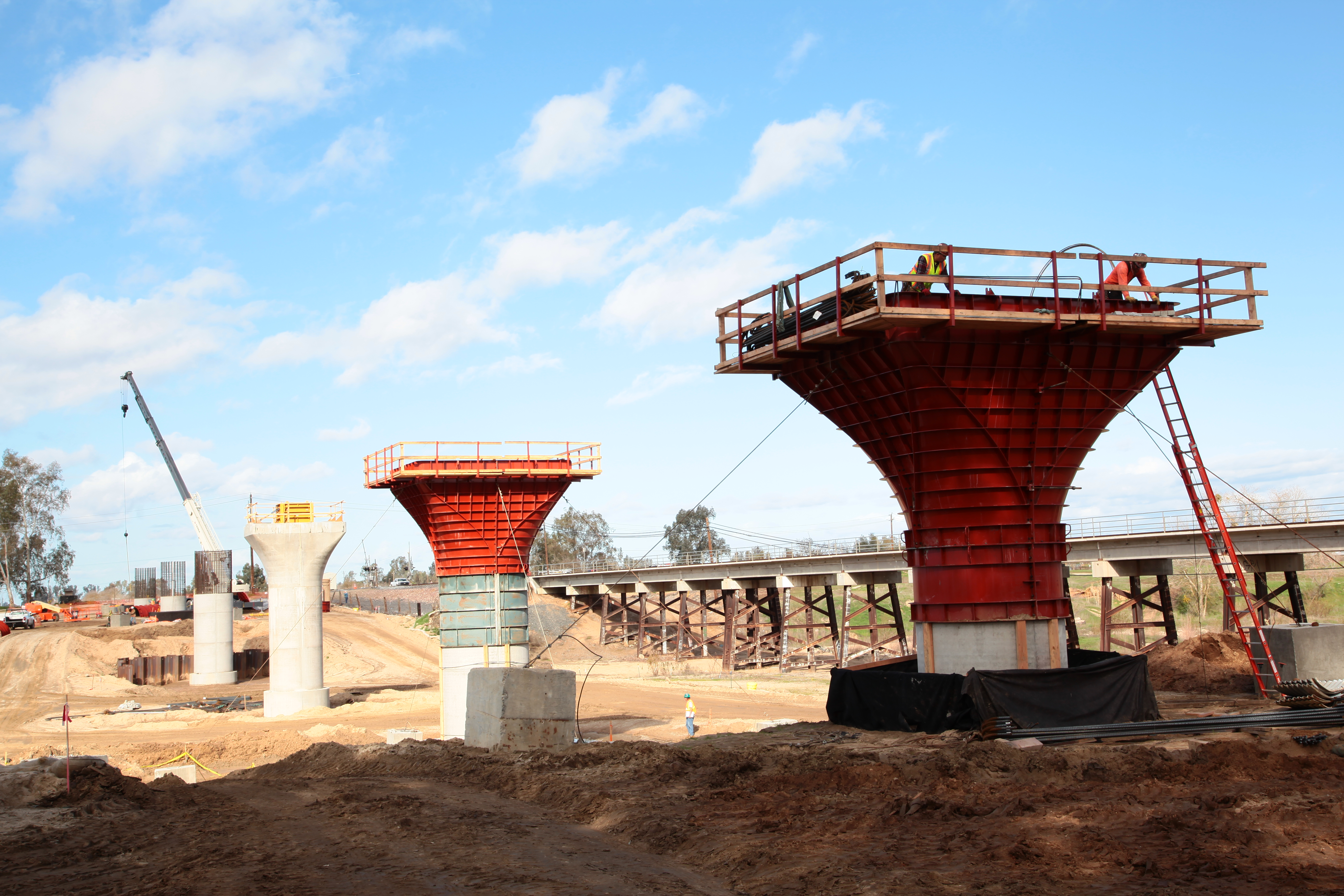
Construction in January 2016. The BNSF Railway bridge is visible in the background.

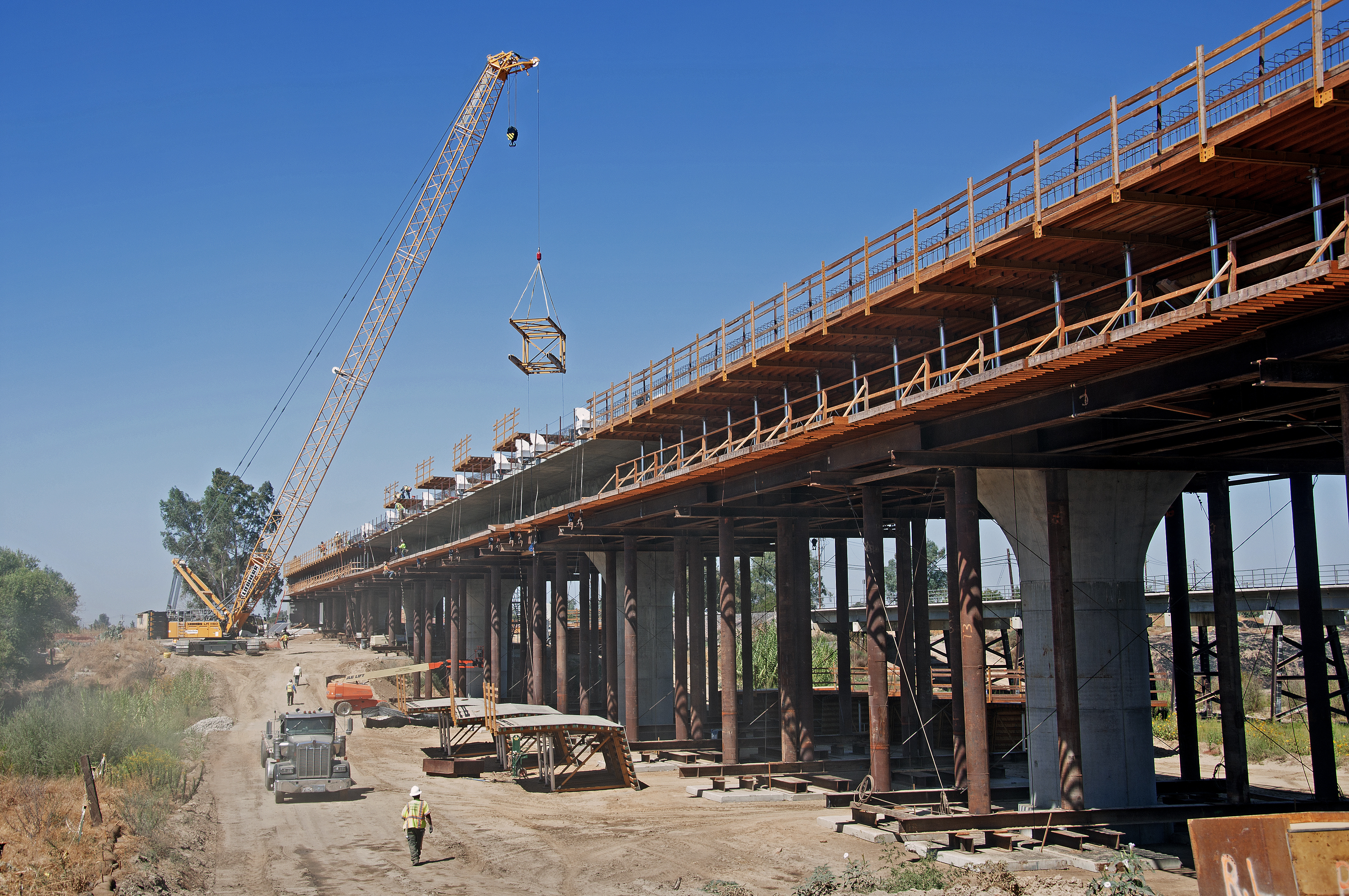
Construction in September 2016. Falsework is in place for the pouring of concrete.

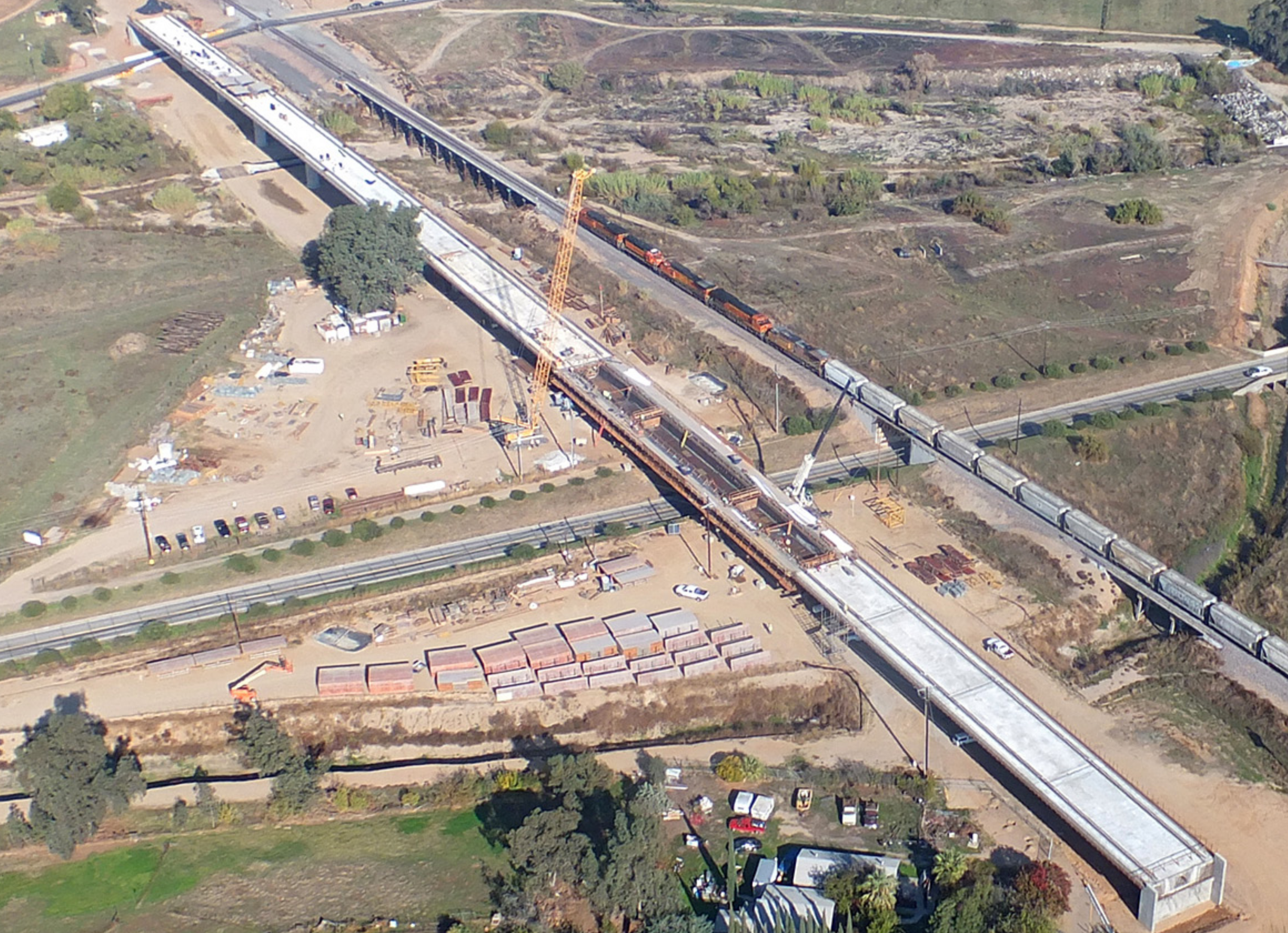
Construction in November 2016. The riverbed is near the top of the image, and CA 145 is in the foreground.
