= Burbank Airport station (California High-Speed Rail) =

Burbank Airport station on the California High-Speed Rail project

Burbank Airport

General information
- Location: Hollywood Burbank Airport; Burbank, California
- Coordinates: 34.202269°N 118.352877°W
- Owner: California High-Speed Rail Authority

History
- Opening: >2030 (CAHSR)

Future services
Preceding station	California High-Speed Rail	Following station
Palmdale toward Merced or San Francisco	Phase 1	Los Angeles toward Anaheim
Location
- Location within California

Burbank Airport station is a proposed California High-Speed Rail station in Burbank, California, to be located at the Hollywood Burbank Airport adjacent to and just east of that facility's proposed replacement passenger terminal, which will be built in the northeast quadrant of the airfield. The site for the rail station is bounded by Cohasset Street to the north, Winona Avenue on the south, and Hollywood Way along the eastern end of the airport property.

The station connects the Palmdale to Burbank and Burbank to Los Angeles project sections of the California high-speed rail line. The station will be mostly underground, but an above-grade building will tie it into the relocated airport terminal complex.

Plans call for the approach tunnels and station box to be mostly built using the cut and cover method — except for those portions under active taxiway D and active runway 8-26, which will be constructed using the Sequential Extraction Method (SEM) to avoid ground subsidence.

The proposed HSR station is separate from the nearby Metrolink commuter rail station on their Antelope Valley Line, known as Burbank Airport–North station. The airport authority runs an "on demand" shuttle between the present terminal and this Metrolink station, which is just northeast of the airport, or passengers can take the Metro 294 bus free with a Metrolink ticket.

There is a joint Metrolink/Amtrak station just to the south of the airport — known on the Metrolink Ventura County Line as Burbank Airport–South and as Hollywood Burbank Airport to Amtrak riders on their Pacific Surfliner. That station is within walking distance to the present airport terminal, but will be considerably farther away once the new terminal opens.
