= 2008 California Proposition 1A =

Proposition 1A
- Safe, Reliable High-Speed Passenger Train Bond Act for the 21st Century

Results
Choice	Votes	%
Yes	6,680,485	52.62%
No	6,015,944	47.38%
Valid votes	12,696,429	92.38%
Invalid or blank votes	1,046,748	7.62%
Total votes	13,743,177	100.00%
County results
Yes
70–80%
60–70%
50–60%
No
70–80%
60–70%
50–60%

Proposition 1A (or the Safe, Reliable High-Speed Passenger Train Bond Act for the 21st Century) is a law that was approved by California voters in the November 2008 state elections. It was a ballot proposition and bond measure that allocated funds for the California High-Speed Rail Authority. It is now contained within Chapter 20 of Division 3 of the California Streets and Highways Code.

== Background ==
The proposition was put before voters by the state legislature. It was originally to appear on the 2004 state election ballot, but was delayed to the 2006 state election because of budgetary concerns raised by Governor Arnold Schwarzenegger. In January 2006, the Governor omitted the initial funds for the project from his $222.6 billion Public Works Bond for the next 10 years. The Governor did include $14.3 million in the 2006-07 budget for the California High-Speed Rail Authority, enough for it to begin some preliminary engineering and detailed study. The proposition was delayed again from 2006 to 2008 to avoid competition with a large infrastructure bond, Proposition 1B, which passed in 2006.

The original proposition would have appeared in the 2008 general election as Proposition 1, but the state legislature enacted Assembly Bill 3034, which replaced that measure with an updated proposal called Proposition 1A. The updated measure included an additional funding requirement and oversight.

== Provisions ==
The law allocates $9.95 billion to the California High-Speed Rail Authority. Of that sum, $9 billion will be used to construct the core segments of the rail line from San Francisco to the Los Angeles area and the rest will be spent on improvements to local railroad systems that will connect locations away from the high-speed rail mainline to the high-speed system. Prop 1A required the California High-Speed Rail Authority to "seek private and other public funds to cover the remaining costs." The project also requires federal matching funds, since the $9.95 billion bond covers only part of the estimated cost of the initial core segment. The money will be raised through general obligation bonds that are paid off over a period of 30 years.

== Results ==
Proposition 1A
Choice	Votes	%
For	6,680,485	52.62
Against	6,015,944	47.38
Total	12,696,429	100.00
Valid votes	12,696,429	92.38
Invalid/blank votes	1,046,748	7.62
Total votes	13,743,177	100.00
Registered voters/turnout		79.4

== Supporters ==
The following people were listed in the official voter information guide as supporters:

- Jim Earp, Executive Director California Alliance for Jobs
- Bob Balgenorth, President State Building & Construction Trades Council of California
- Lucy Dunn, President Orange County Business Council
- Steven B. Falk, President San Francisco Chamber of Commerce
- Gary Toebben, President Los Angeles Area Chamber of Commerce
- Fran Florez, Vice-chair California High-Speed Rail Authority

== Opponents ==
The following people were listed in the official voter information guide as opponents:

- Hon. Chuck DeVore, California State Assemblyman
- Richard Tolmach, President California Rail Foundation
- Mike Arnold, Ph.D., Co-chair Marin Citizens for Effective Transportation
- Hon. Tom McClintock, State Senator
- Hon. George Runner, State Senator
- Jon Coupal, President Howard Jarvis Taxpayers Association
