= California Intercity High-Speed Rail Commission =

Former commission responsible for planning high-speed rail service in California

The California Intercity High-Speed Rail Commission was created by the California legislature in 1993 to develop a plan that was to begin construction in 2000 and by 2020 provide high-speed rail service between San Diego, Los Angeles, San Francisco, and Sacramento.

In 1996 the Commission determined that high-speed rail was feasible in California. The Commission in 1996 projected that the construction period would be from 2000 to 2005 between Los Angeles and San Francisco and from 2006 to 2008 the extensions to San Diego and Sacramento would be built. The total cost of the San Diego-Los Angeles-San Francisco-Sacramento system would be $18.18 billion.

The commission was replaced in 1996 by the California High-Speed Rail Authority, which aims to connect Gilroy (111 kilometres south of San Francisco) to Palmdale (83 kilometres north of Los Angeles) by 2045.

== History ==
Prior to the creation of the Commission, in 1989 the California legislature had created another: the California-Nevada Super Speed Train Commission. Commission staff projected that a high-speed train would reach Anaheim as early as 1998, and that the final construction of a complete high-speed rail network linking all of California would be completed by 2039.

The California Intercity High Speed Rail Commission was created via California Senate Resolution No. 6. The Commission conducted four key studies for its twenty-year plan, namely: economic impact and comparison with other modes of transport; demand and market study; route and environmental constraints; and an institutional and financing options analysis.

In 1996, the Board of Directors consisted of nine directors, with Dean R. Dunphy as Chairman and Daniel S. Leavitt as Executive Director of the Commission.

=== 1996 Plan ===
Construction would be financed via a 6¢ per gallon tax on gasoline and diesel, to be collected from 1998. According to the Commission, such a tax - because of its adverse economic impact - would cause the destruction of 35,000 jobs in California over the period 2000-2020. Considering costs and benefits, the Commission estimated that in the 50 years between 2000 and 2050, a system limited Los Angeles-San Francisco would have a negative impact on California's economy, while a system that included San Diego and Sacramento would bring $3.3 billion in net benefits to the economy after 50 years.

=== Transfer ===
In 1996, the Commission was replaced by the California High-Speed Rail Authority, which aspires to build the California High-Speed Rail project. In 2025, the Authority hoped to connect Gilroy (111 kilometres south of San Francisco) to Palmdale (83 kilometres north of Los Angeles) in 2045, 52 years after the Commission's creation.

== Bibliography ==
- Elkind, Ethan N.; Segal, Katie; Lamm, Ted; Maroulis, Michael (January 2022). "Getting Back on Track" (PDF). Center for Law, Energy and the Environment de la UC Berkeley School of Law y The University of California Institute of Transportation Studies: University of California Berkeley.
