= California High-Speed Rail =

Under-construction passenger rail system in the US

Overview
- Owner: California High-Speed Rail Authority
- Area served: IOS: Merced – Bakersfield; Planned Phase 1 extensions: north to San Francisco south to Los Angeles; Future Phase 2 extensions: north to Sacramento south to San Diego
- Locale: California, United States
- Transit type: High-speed rail
- Number of stations: 5 on the IOS; up to 24 authorized in completed system
- Chief executive: Joe Stephenshaw (interim)
- Website: www.hsr.ca.gov

Operation
- Operation will start: 2031–2033
- Operator: DB E.C.O. North America Inc.

Technical
- System length: IOS: 171 mi (275 km); Phase 1: 494 mi (795 km); Total: 776 mi (1,249 km)
- No. of tracks: 2
- Track gauge: 4 ft 8 1/2 in (1,435 mm) standard gauge
- Electrification: Overhead line, 25 kV 60 Hz AC
- Top speed: 220 mph (350 km/h)

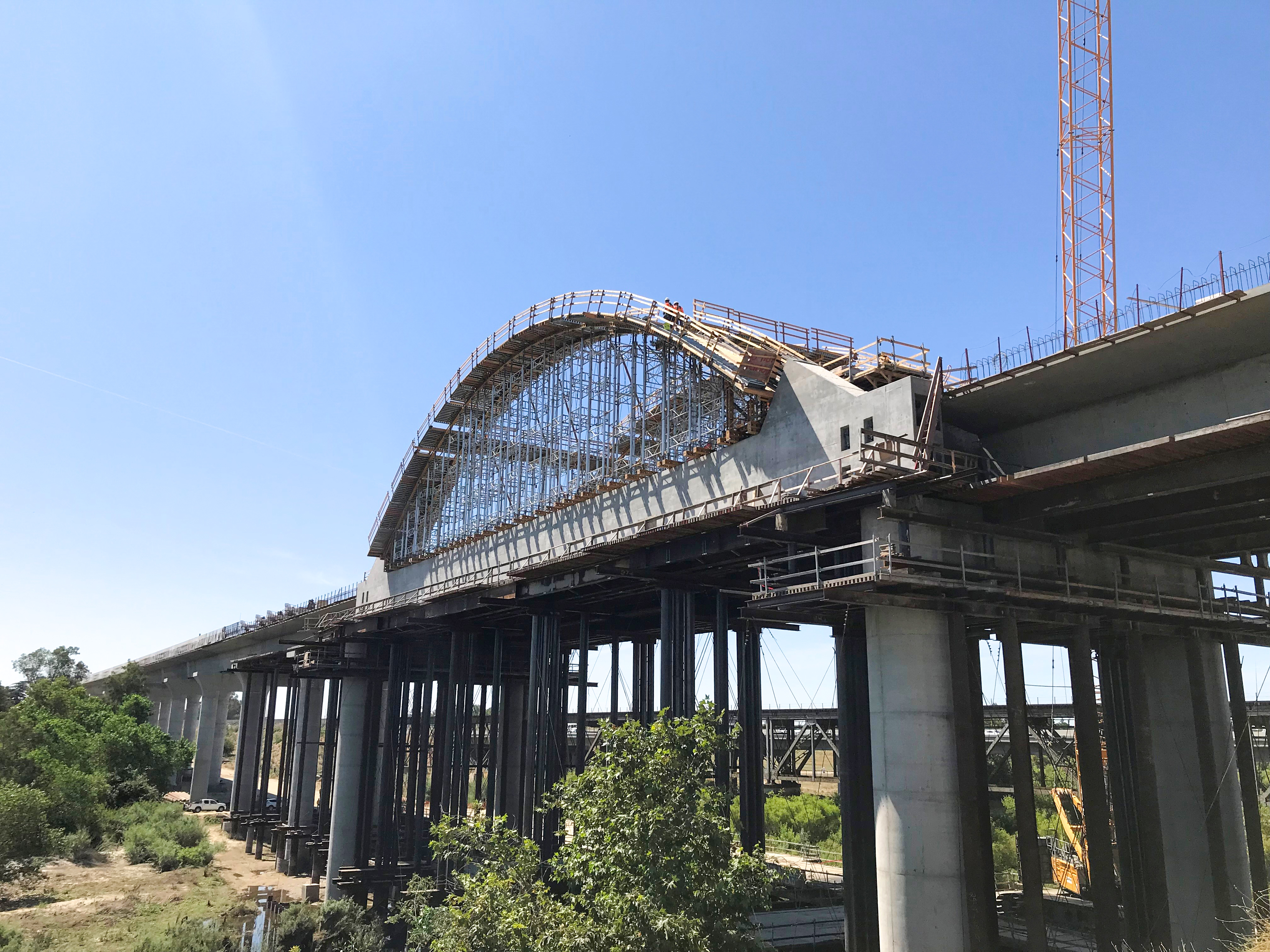
San Joaquin River Viaduct under construction in 2019.

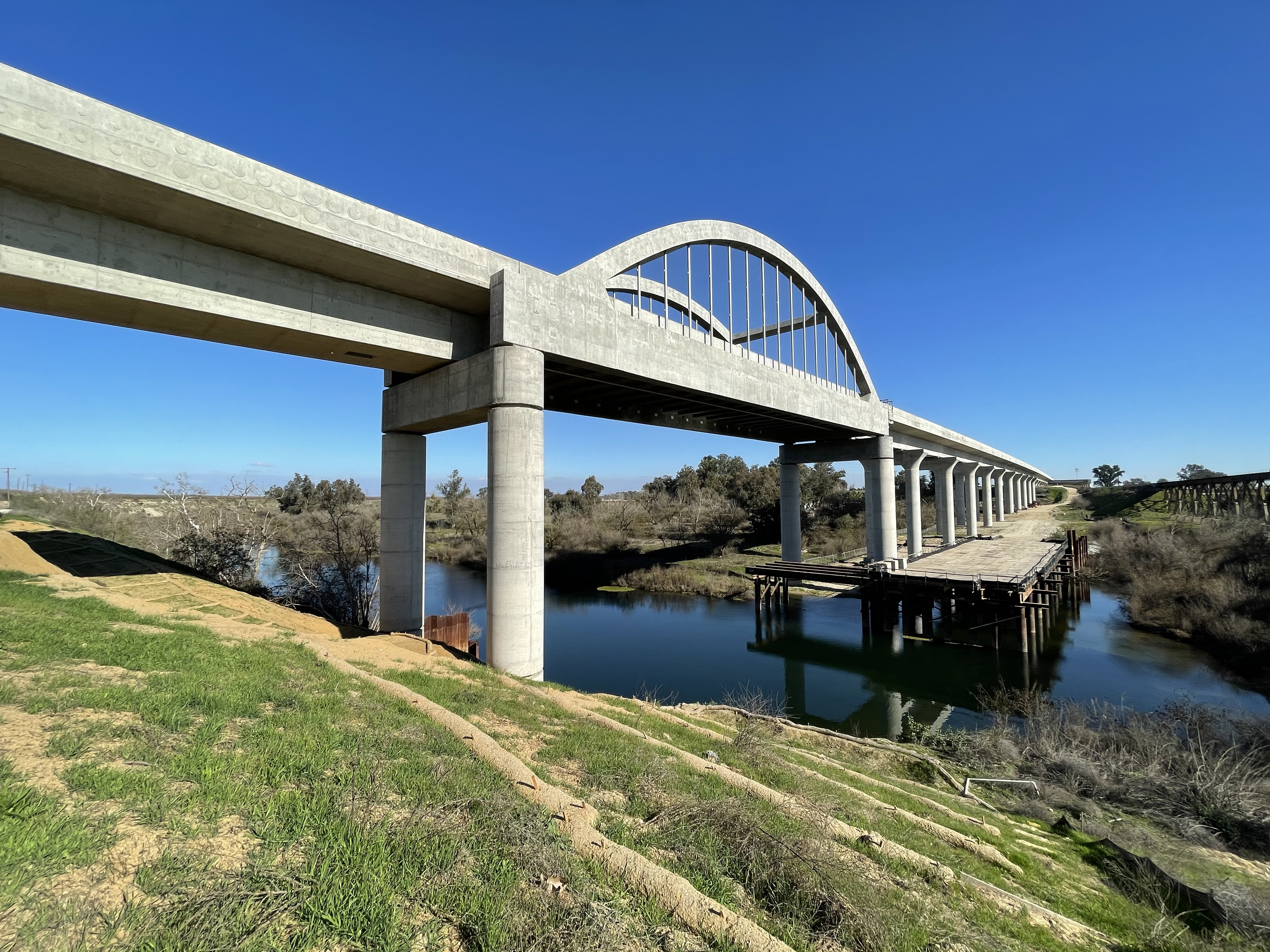
The same viaduct completed in February 2021.

California High-Speed Rail (CAHSR) is a publicly-funded high-speed rail system under construction across California, United States. The project was authorized by a 2008 statewide ballot, and is being constructed by the California High-Speed Rail Authority. With a top speed of 220 mph (350 km/h), CAHSR trains would be the fastest in the U.S. (Note: The Acela, with a top speed of 160 miles per hour (260 km/h), is currently the fastest rail service in the U.S.) and among the fastest in the world. (Note: The Fuxing series in China, with a top speed of 350 kilometres per hour (220 mph), is currently the fastest rail service in the world in terms of operating speed.) Phase 1 of the CAHSR project, which is about 494 miles (795 km) long, will connect the Bay Area and the Greater Los Angeles Area through the Central Valley communities. Phase 2 would extend the system north to Sacramento and south to San Diego, for a total system length of 776 miles (1,249 km).

The Initial Operating Segment (IOS), a 171-mile section of Phase 1 in the Central Valley, is currently under construction, and will connect communities from Merced to Bakersfield at a cost of $36.7 billion. Revenue service on the IOS is projected to begin in 2033 or 2034.

Construction began in the Central Valley in 2015, and as of August 2025, a total of $13.8 billion had been spent on the project. Other major expenditures include upgrades to existing rail lines in the San Francisco Bay Area and Greater Los Angeles, where Phase 1 is planned to share tracks with conventional passenger trains. Regulatory clearance has been obtained for the full route connecting San Francisco and Los Angeles. However, the California High-Speed Rail Authority ("the Authority") has not yet received sufficient funding commitment to construct the full buildout of the Phase 1 system, currently estimated at $89–$128 billion.

As of August 2025, the Authority's interim goal is to connect the Bay Area to the IOS via a connection at Gilroy, which is 70 miles (110 km) south of San Francisco, to either Bakersfield or Palmdale, by the year 2038. The estimated cost to build the San Francisco–Bakersfield system is $54 billion, and the estimate for the San Francisco–Palmdale system is $84 billion. The extension to Palmdale will connect the project to the Southland via the Metrolink system, and the Burbank–Los Angeles–Anaheim segment will complete the Phase I system.

The project is intended to alleviate housing shortages, air traffic and highway congestion, reduce pollution and greenhouse gas emissions, and provide economic benefits by linking the state's inland regions to coastal cities. Phase 1 is intended to provide a non-stop express connection between San Francisco and Los Angeles in two hours and 40 minutes.

The project has garnered significant criticism focused on delays and cost overruns, the decision to construct the first high-speed segment in the less densely populated Central Valley, and changes to plans that may lengthen travel time beyond the legally mandated minimum. These issues have been caused by management turnover, legal challenges, difficulties negotiating with landowners and utility companies, and unreliable funding.

== Background ==
=== Legislative context ===
High-speed rail in California was first proposed in 1979 by Governor Jerry Brown. In 1982, Brown signed a bill authorizing $1.25 billion in bonds for a high-speed rail line between Los Angeles and San Diego. The law failed due to concerns over its economic viability, environmental impact, and Caltrans' objection to the handling of the project by a private company. In 1993, the state created the California Intercity High-Speed Rail Commission. In 1996, the California Legislature and Governor Pete Wilson passed the High-Speed Rail Act, which formed the California High-Speed Rail Authority to plan, design, construct and operate a statewide high-speed rail system.

In 2008, Governor Arnold Schwarzenegger championed Proposition 1A (Prop 1A), which authorized $9 billion in bonds to begin the planning and construction of high-speed rail and a further $950 million to upgrade commuter rail systems in Northern and Southern California that would connect with the high-speed rail system. Prop 1A, which passed with about 53 percent of the vote, set several requirements for the high-speed rail system, including that the nonstop travel time from the Salesforce Transit Center (formerly: San Francisco Transbay Terminal) in San Francisco to Los Angeles Union Station in Los Angeles should be no more than two hours and 40 minutes.

After the prioritized funding of the San Francisco to Los Angeles section, Prop 1A proposed additional potential corridors for high-speed rail investment:

- Oakland–San Jose
- Sacramento–Merced
- Los Angeles–Inland Empire
- Inland Empire–San Diego
- Los Angeles–Irvine

The only specific route requirements set by Prop 1A were to complete a link between San Francisco and Los Angeles, and that the Authority would study the additional corridors for possible inclusion. It did not require that all corridors be built, indicate the order of construction, or specify precise routes and station locations other than in San Francisco and Los Angeles. The designation of the San Francisco to Los Angeles segment as "Phase 1," and additional adopted corridors as "Phase 2," was published in the Authority's 2012 Business Plan.

=== Statewide objectives ===
The planned high-speed rail system would reduce travel times between the northern and southern parts of the state. Driving or taking an intercity bus between San Francisco and Los Angeles takes five to eight hours. Since the Coast Daylight was discontinued in 1974, there has been no direct rail connection between San Francisco and Los Angeles, with the closest Amtrak service now in Oakland. The Amtrak Coast Starlight, the only direct rail service from Oakland to Los Angeles, takes eleven hours and runs once daily. While the Gold Runner takes about nine hours, a bus transfer is required for part of the route. High-speed rail is intended to be competitive with air travel; while the actual station-to-station time would be slower than flying, reduced waiting and boarding times and fewer security checks would make total travel times competitive, with other potential benefits including passenger comfort and greater reliability. The entry of high speed rail into the transportation market typically results in improved on-time flight performance, service quality, and price competition. High-speed rail in California would reduce flight congestion on one of the busiest domestic air routes in the US, with the SF-LA short haul air routes averaging 132 scheduled flights daily.

The high-speed rail system may relieve housing pressure in major urban areas, especially the Bay Area, by providing access to cheaper housing in the Central Valley, which would be particularly beneficial for business travelers and hybrid remote workers who commute only a few times a week. While the rail project may incentivize denser housing and job growth around stations, with cities such as Fresno and Bakersfield planning for major real estate investments in their downtowns, the urban policy advocacy group SPUR noted the risk of urban sprawl as a result of increased housing demand in the Central Valley, and that the state should consider mitigating this in its planning approach. Phase 1 of high-speed rail is projected to reduce annual statewide CO_{2} emissions by about 600,000 tons by replacing highway trips and flights; however, it would only account for 0.2 percent of the state's total emissions from all sectors.

In 2023, Caltrans issued the 2023 California State Rail Plan, which is a comprehensive plan to upgrade and modernize the state's intercity passenger and freight rail systems through 2050. Provisions of the plan include increasing the capacity of existing railways, establishing new services, improving service frequencies and train speeds, and integrating ticketing between transit agencies in order for ticketing through all rail systems to be able to be done statewide. The plan outlines the integration of high-speed rail into the statewide system as its primary north-south passenger link. Although the Authority has not indicated completion dates for the full system, the 2023 version of the state rail plan used 2050 for the completion of both Phase 1 and Phase 2.

== Plans, construction and project status ==
The project is split into two major phases: Phase 1 is to connect San Francisco to Los Angeles via the Central Valley; Phase 2 is an extension of Phase 1 both to the north from Merced to Sacramento and to the south from Los Angeles to San Diego via the Inland Empire. As of 2024, the Authority is targeting completion of the "Initial Operating Segment" (IOS), a 171-mile (275 km) section within the Phase 1 route in the Central Valley, with 119 miles (192 km) under active construction. The project has received approximately $23 billion in combined state and federal funding through the end of 2024 (including a disputed $3.3 billion of federal funding), and has spent a total of $13.8 billion. As of February 2024, the entire Phase 1 was projected to cost between $89–128 billion, with allowance for future inflation.

=== Phase 1 ===
High-speed rail project status as of October 2026

Phase 1 of the planned route, about 494 miles (795 km) long, runs from the Salesforce Transit Center in San Francisco to the Anaheim Regional Transportation Intermodal Center in Anaheim, with intermediate stops planned for Millbrae, San Jose, Gilroy, Merced, Madera, Fresno, Kings/Tulare (Hanford), Bakersfield, Palmdale, Burbank and Los Angeles. An additional station between Los Angeles and Anaheim, at Norwalk or Fullerton, is being considered. The existing 4th and King Caltrain station in San Francisco is expected to be the northern terminus of Phase 1 until the future completion of the Downtown Rail Extension (now known as The Portal) to the Salesforce Transit Center.

From San Francisco, the planned route runs south to Gilroy before crossing the Diablo Range eastward over Pacheco Pass into the Central Valley. The route branches north to Merced via a flying wye which is intended to serve as the connection for a future Phase 2 extension to Sacramento. As part of Phase 1, Merced is planned to serve as a transfer point to the Gold Runner and Altamont Corridor Express (Note: ACE plans to expand operations to Merced by 2030.) (ACE) trains continuing towards Stockton, Sacramento and other destinations. As of the 2025 Supplemental Project Update, the Authority is considering delaying construction of the Merced extension in order to prioritize an earlier connection to the Bay Area through Gilroy. South of there, Madera through Bakersfield stations are located along the main line in the Central Valley. From Bakersfield, the high-speed rail route crosses the Tehachapi Mountains via the Tehachapi Pass to Palmdale in the Mojave Desert. It then tunnels under the San Gabriel Mountains to reach Los Angeles and Anaheim.

In the urbanized areas from San Francisco to Gilroy and from Burbank to Anaheim, the Phase 1 route follows existing railroad right-of-ways. In 2012, the Authority adopted a "blended" approach to construction in these segments, which would involve high-speed trains sharing track with Amtrak and local commuter trains, specifically Caltrain in the Bay Area and Metrolink in Southern California. This approach was adopted to reduce costs and mitigate the impact of construction on surrounding communities, but also limits train speed in these sections to a maximum of 110 miles per hour (180 km/h). Between Gilroy and Burbank, the planned route will run on dedicated high-speed tracks.

==== Initial Operating Segment (IOS) ====
The Authority is advancing work in sections, first targeting full completion of a 171-mile (275 km) "Initial Operating Segment" (IOS). Within this segment, 119 miles (192 km) are under active construction.

The IOS is intended to begin carrying passengers along a limited portion of the route before the full Phase 1 is completed. This initial service would span either from Merced or Madera, to Fresno and Hanford, and then to Bakersfield. High-speed trains would fully replace existing, slower Amtrak Gold Runner service south of Merced to Bakersfield. Gold Runner passengers continuing to Southern California currently transfer to Amtrak Thruway buses at Bakersfield. This bus connection will remain necessary until the construction of Phase 1 reaches Palmdale, where the high speed rail station will be integrated with the existing Metrolink transportation hub.

As of April 2026, the IOS construction progress includes 80 miles (130 km), or 67%, of contiguous guideway declared complete and ready for track-laying, as well as 58 civil construction structures completed, 30 underway, and 4 not started yet. The remainder of the planned 119 miles (192 km) is expected to complete civil construction by the end of 2026. 54 miles (87 km) of extensions to Merced and to Bakersfield, which would complete the IOS, are under engineering design.

IOS construction status, as of September 2026
	Section	Section Start	Section End	Length	Funding Status	Type	Civil Construction Status	Track and Systems Status	Notes
Initial Operating Segment (IOS)	Merced Extension	Merced	Madera	34 miles (55 km)	Fully funded	High-speed ROW	progressive design-build contract out for bid		Proposed de-scoping: terminate with Merced HSR station at Mission Ave instead of Downtown
Initial Operating Segment (IOS)	Construction Package 1	Madera	South of Fresno	32 miles (51 km)	Fully funded	High-speed ROW	Active construction, expected completion: Aug 2027	Contract awarded	Track & OCS works scheduled for 2027 Q4 - 2029 Q1
Initial Operating Segment (IOS)	Construction Package 2–3	South of Fresno	Tulare/Kern county border	65 miles (105 km)	Fully funded	High-speed ROW	Active construction, expected completion: May 2027	Contract awarded	Track & OCS works scheduled for 2027 Q1 - 2028 Q4
Initial Operating Segment (IOS)	Construction Package 4	Tulare/Kern county border	Poplar Avenue	22 miles (35 km)	Fully funded	High-speed ROW	Declared substantively complete in January 2025	Contractor mobilizing	Track & OCS works scheduled for 2026 Q3 - 2027 Q2
Initial Operating Segment (IOS)	Bakersfield Extension	Poplar Avenue	Bakersfield	18.5 miles (29.8 km)	Fully funded	High-speed ROW	Advancing to 60% design		Project scope uncertain due to ongoing alignment dispute with the City of Shafter

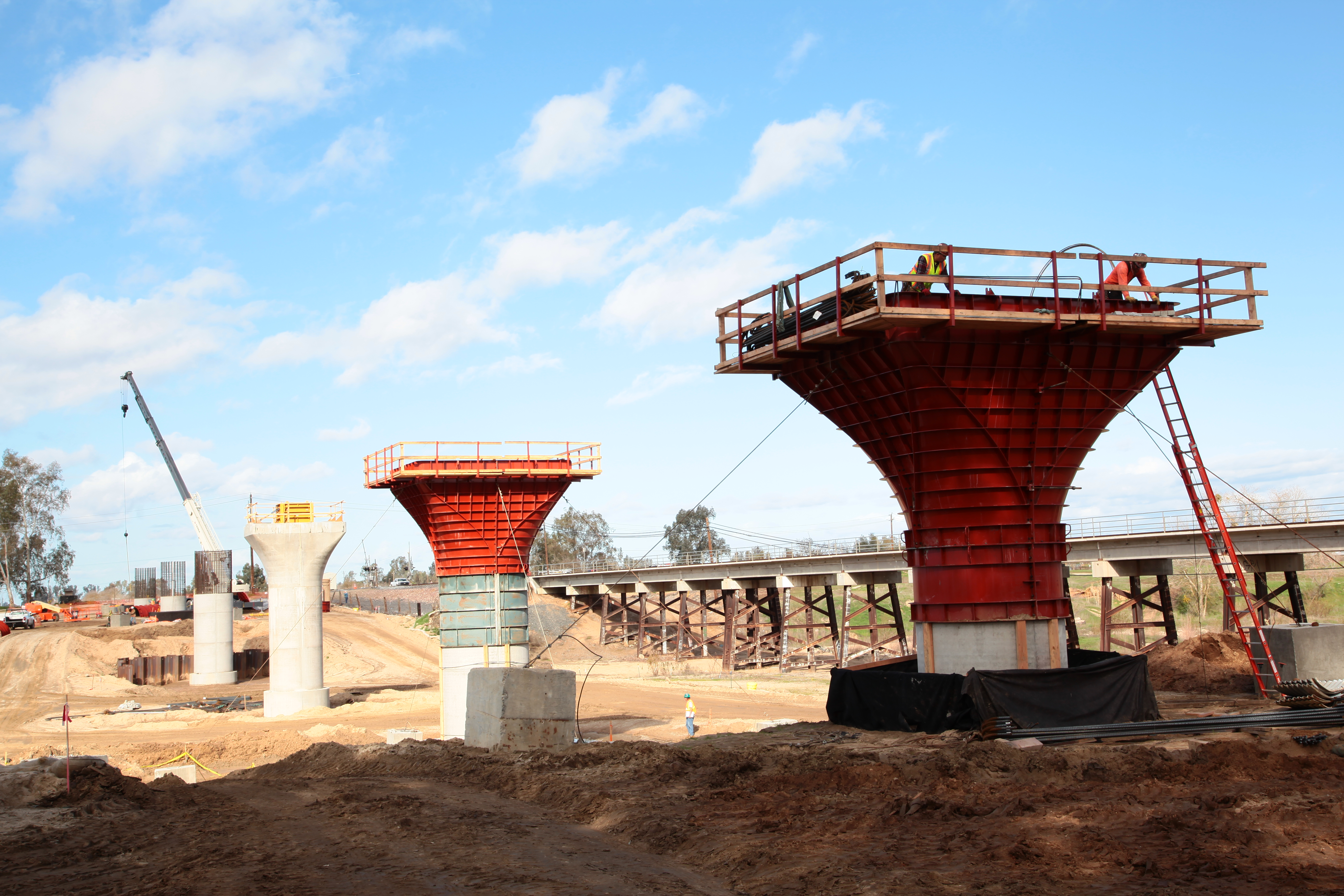
The Fresno River Viaduct, part of the IOS, under construction, 2016.

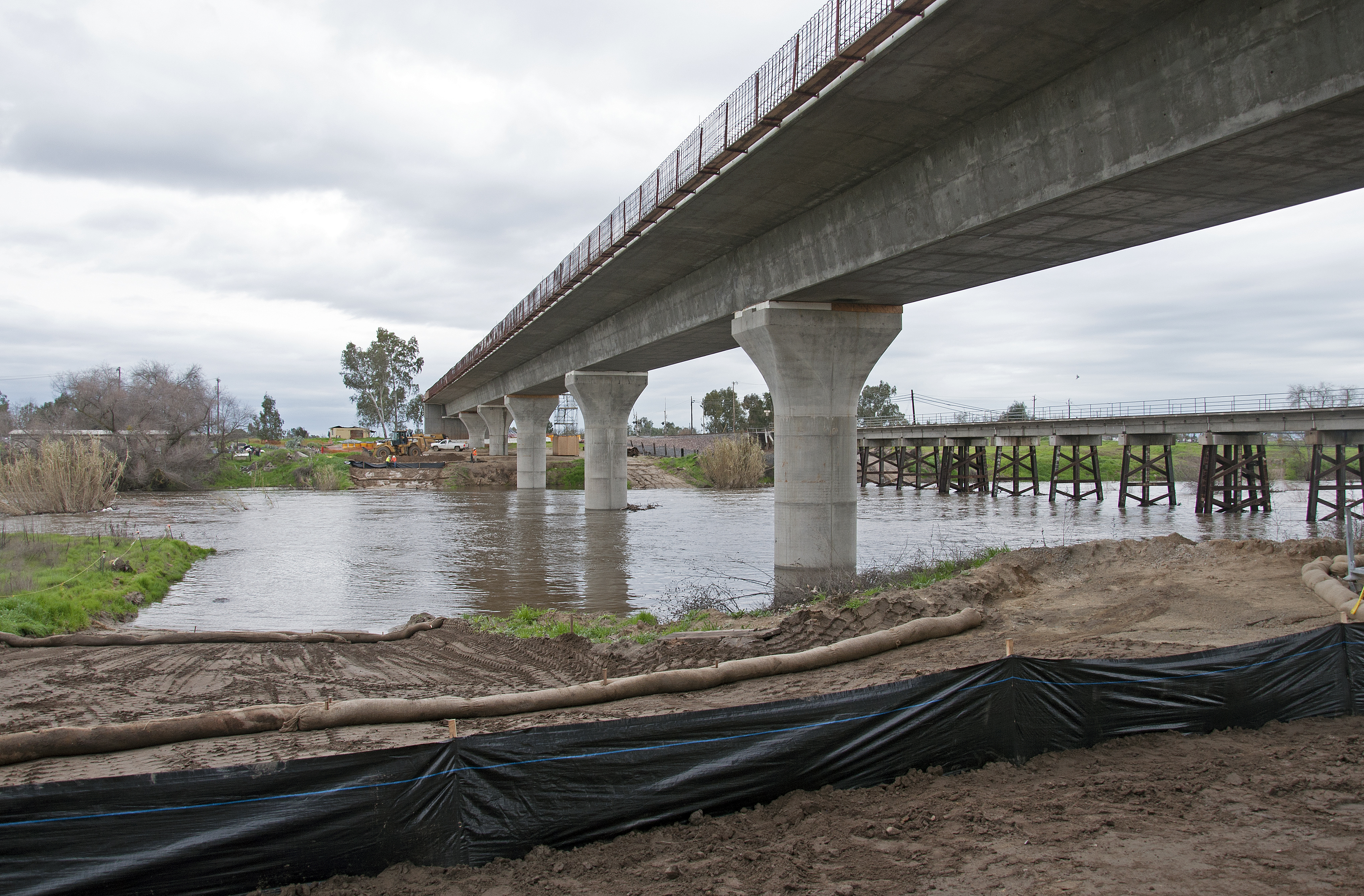
The same location, 2017.

The scope of the IOS has changed several times in the project's history. In 2012 it was planned to run from Merced through Bakersfield to Burbank (just north of Los Angeles), a distance of about 300 miles (480 km). This would have closed a major gap in California intercity rail services, as the existing Gold Runner terminates at Bakersfield and does not continue on to Los Angeles. In 2016, due to changes in funding and financing plans, the Authority changed the IOS to a northern segment between San Jose and Bakersfield, the "Silicon Valley to Central Valley line". In 2019 Gavin Newsom chose the current definition of an IOS between Merced and Bakersfield in the Central Valley, a 171-mile (275 km) long segment with 119 miles (192 km) under active construction. If additional funding becomes available, the Authority still intends to construct the northern Bay Area connection before the southern connection to Los Angeles.

Construction on the IOS began with a groundbreaking in Fresno on January 6, 2015, with construction of the first vertical structure, Fresno River Viaduct, beginning on June 16, 2015. The first 119 miles, stretching from Madera south to Shafter, a city about 20 miles (32 km) northwest of Bakersfield, are being constructed under four design-build contracts titled "construction packages". These include constructing the railroad grade, viaducts, road overpasses and underpasses and other structures along the route, but not the track itself. In August 2022, the Authority approved design contracts for the remaining 52 miles (84 km) of the IOS connecting Madera to Merced and Shafter to Bakersfield, with construction contracts expected in 2025–2026.

In October 2022, the Authority approved a design contract for the Merced, Fresno, Kings/Tulare and Bakersfield stations. Planning for the Madera station is occurring under a separate agreement with the San Joaquin Joint Powers Authority. The construction contract for track and electrical power systems on the IOS is expected in 2024–2025. As of February 2024, Construction Packages 1–3 were more than 70 percent complete and Construction Package 4 was at 98 percent. The 2023 Project Update Report projected completion of the full Merced–Bakersfield line in 2029.

By 2025, the Authority had projected completion of the IOS in 2031; the Inspector General, however, determined the IOS (including Merced and Bakersfield extensions) was unlikely to be operational by 2033.

In a June 2026 Business Plan, the Authority estimated that the Merced–Bakersfield early operating segment would cost $35.7 billion and passenger revenue service was expected to begin in 2033. The estimate covers a scaled-back version of the project that includes a shorter route, a single-track infrastructure, a proposed station south of downtown Merced, and a temporary terminus in northern Bakersfield. In July 2026, the Office of the Inspector General reported that the Authority’s schedule risk analysis put the latest projected completion date for the Merced–Bakersfield segment at September 2034.

==== Blended corridor investments ====
Stadler KISS electric trainset operated by Caltrain after electrification

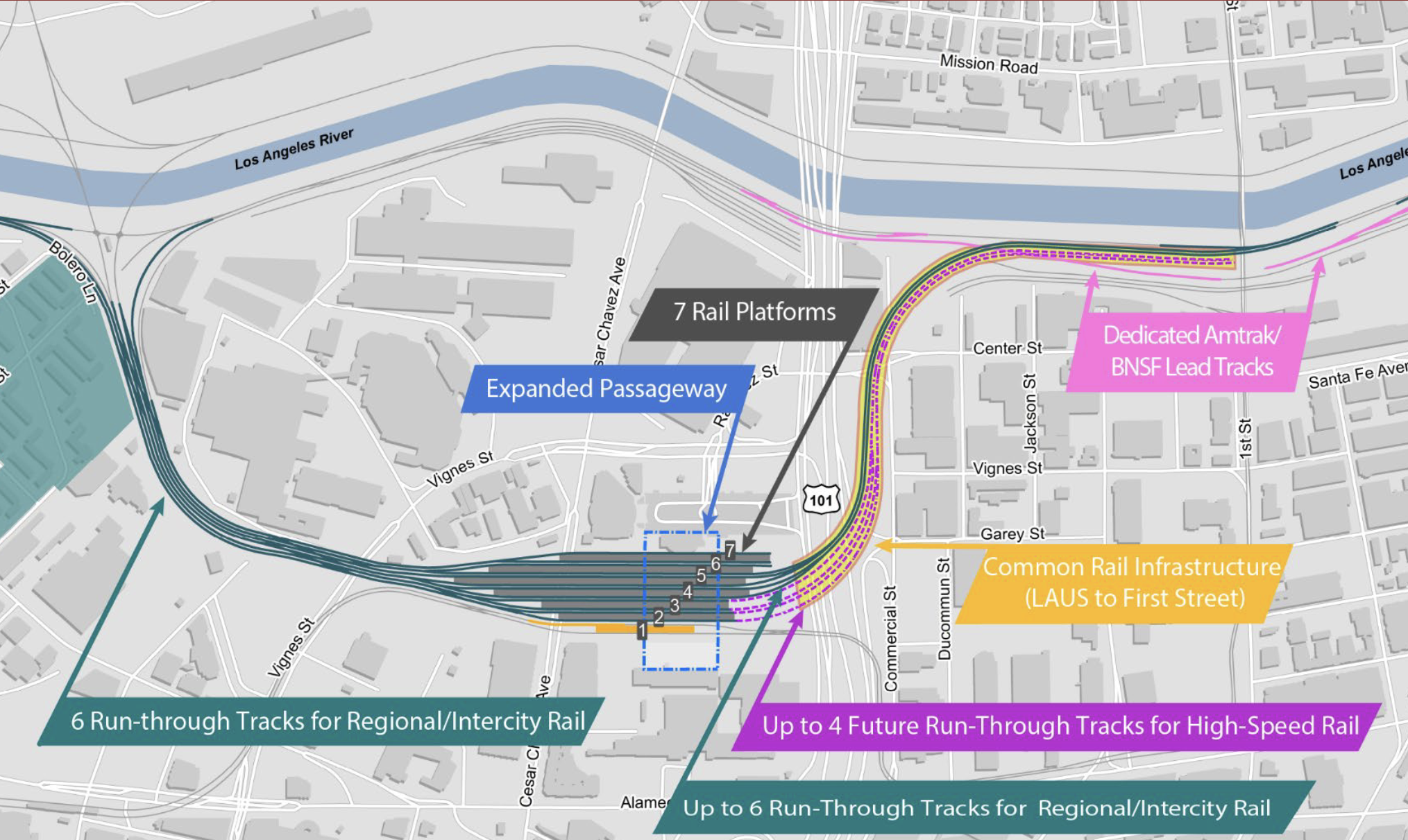
A diagram of the Link US project in Los Angeles Union Station, showing the location of planned high-speed rail platforms.

Concurrently with Central Valley construction, the Authority has worked with other California transportation agencies and rail operators to prepare the northern and southern blended segments for high-speed rail operations. In the Bay Area, the electrification of Caltrain will enable electric high-speed trains to run on the existing Caltrain commuter rail corridor from San Francisco to San Jose. Work began in 2017 and was completed in September 2024.

The corridor from San Jose to Gilroy will also require electrification; as of February 2024, the Authority was still in negotiations with Union Pacific Railroad over proposed alterations to the tracks. Several grade separations and passing tracks have been completed or are planned along the route from San Francisco to Gilroy, in order to improve track capacity, speed and safety for blended Caltrain/high-speed rail operations. Since many at-grade crossings will remain, (Note: For example, 49 from San Mateo to Palo Alto and 29 from San Jose to Gilroy.) other safety improvements such as quad gates are being considered.

In Southern California, the Link US project plans to reconfigure Los Angeles Union Station from a terminal to a run-through station and add two dedicated high-speed rail platforms. The shared Amtrak and Metrolink tracks from Burbank to Anaheim will require electrification. Between Los Angeles and Fullerton, the rail corridor is also heavily used by BNSF freight trains coming from the Ports of Los Angeles and Long Beach, requiring further separation to prevent congestion. As of November 2023, the Authority proposed to build a fourth track on the existing three-track corridor, with two electrified tracks to be used for passenger trains (including high-speed rail) and two non-electrified tracks for freight, in addition to grade separations and crossing safety improvements. Some freight trains may be allowed to use the passenger tracks during off-peak hours.

The Authority has also funded other projects such as the installation of positive train control systems along the shared commuter rail lines, and upgrades to existing stations and railyards to accommodate both future high-speed rail and other passenger rail services.

==== Remainder of Phase 1 ====
Construction of the remaining Phase 1 route is still on hold due to budget constraints. As of June 2024, the environmental impact statements for 463 miles (745 km) of the 494-mile (795 km) route had been certified, which specifies the alignment from San Francisco to Los Angeles and clears it for detailed engineering design and construction. The remaining segment to be certified is the Los Angeles–Anaheim section.

The Merced to San Jose section would cross the Pacheco Pass roughly along the route of SR 152. It would include several tunnels, the longest of which would be 13.5 miles (21.7 km), making it the longest intercity rail tunnel in the US. Engineering challenges along this section include "poor-quality rock formations, faults and shear zones, and potentially high groundwater inflows that can affect tunnel stability." The Authority expects to start design work on this section in 2024, and begin pre-construction work such as land acquisition in about 2026–2028, funds permitting.

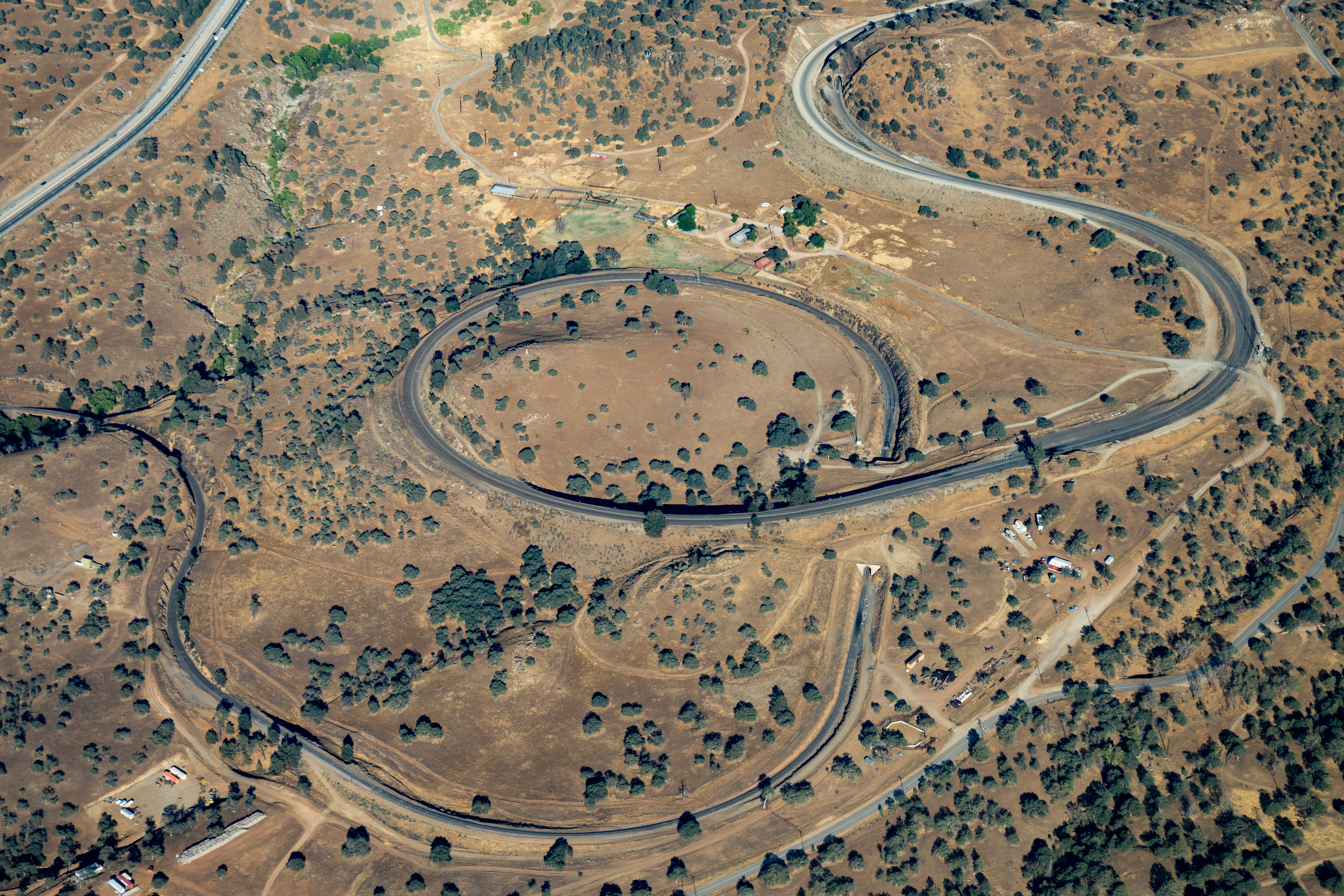
Part of Phase 1 will travel through the Tehachapi Pass, which is currently traversed by the Union Pacific Railroad. Tehachapi Loop shown here.

The Bakersfield–Palmdale section of the line will cross Tehachapi Pass, roughly parallelling the Union Pacific Railroad's Mojave Subdivision. Due to its heavy freight traffic and sharp curves (including the famous Tehachapi Loop), there is no current passenger service through the pass. While the proposed high-speed rail alignment will not include any long tunnels comparable to those in Pacheco Pass, it has nine shorter tunnels and several viaducts more than 200 feet (61 m) high. The maximum grade through the pass would be 2.8 percent, making it the steepest portion of the Phase 1 route. At a press conference in January 2025 in Kern County, state and CHSRA leaders reiterated the importance of this section and promoted the vision of a combined CAHSR–High Desert Corridor–Brightline West rail corridor.

From Palmdale to Burbank the proposed route crosses the San Gabriel Mountains on an alignment roughly along SR 14. (Note: Several different options are still being studied for the route, but the Authority has identified the "SR14A" route along State Route 14 as its preferred option.) It would require the most tunneling of any of the mountain crossings, with four separate tunnels totaling 28 miles (45 km) in length. One of the major challenges along this section is the crossing of the San Andreas Fault and several parallel, smaller fault zones, where a large earthquake could significantly deform the tracks. To compensate for this, the rail beds and tunnel diameters will be constructed wider at fault crossings to allow for any needed track realignment in the future. The tracks will cross the San Andreas Fault itself above ground.

In total, the southern extension from Bakersfield to Los Angeles may require 36 miles (58 km) of tunnels. In 2018, the Authority estimated that the tunneling may cost $26–45 billion.

==== Operations infrastructure ====
The high-speed rail system is planned to run entirely on renewable energy. Due to the large energy demand of high-speed trains, the system is being planned to generate much of its own power. Solar arrays and battery backup systems are to be installed at traction power substations along the route; however, they will still be tied into the California power grid, allowing them to share energy as needed. The Authority plans to install solar panels capable of producing 44 megawatts, and batteries to store 124 megawatt hours. The on-site generation of solar power is estimated to cut future electricity costs by 75 percent compared to purchasing it from the state grid, and will keep the system operational if the grid suffers a blackout.

There are plans for a heavy maintenance facility, serving as the location for major train inspections and repairs, in the Central Valley. It will also serve to receive and test high-speed trainsets along the IOS track currently being constructed. Also planned along the Phase 1 route are three light maintenance facilities for routine train inspections and cleaning, with locations in the Bay Area, Central Valley and greater Los Angeles, as well as four maintenance of way facilities spaced throughout the route. The exact siting for these facilities has yet to be determined. As of 2019, both Fresno and Kern Counties had expressed interest in hosting the heavy maintenance facility.

=== Phase 2 ===
Phase 2 would construct two major extensions to the system. The northern extension would stretch 115 miles (185 km) from Merced to Sacramento, with intermediate stops at Modesto and Stockton. It would largely parallel the existing Gold Runner route through the Central Valley. In the south, the system would be extended 167 miles (269 km) from Los Angeles to San Diego. Instead of continuing south from Anaheim, it would split off from the Phase 1 route at Los Angeles Union Station and travel east along I-10 before turning south, following an inland route along I-15 or I-215. This would enable high-speed trains to serve the Inland Empire and inland parts of San Diego County, with stops at Ontario International Airport and Escondido. One or more additional stations may be built, in either El Monte, West Covina, Pomona, San Bernardino, Corona, March ARB, or Murrieta.

If the entire Phase 2 is completed, it would bring the total length of the high-speed rail system to 776 miles (1,249 km). Phase 2 is still early in the planning stages, and would not be constructed until after the completion of Phase 1.

== Rolling stock ==
=== Train design ===
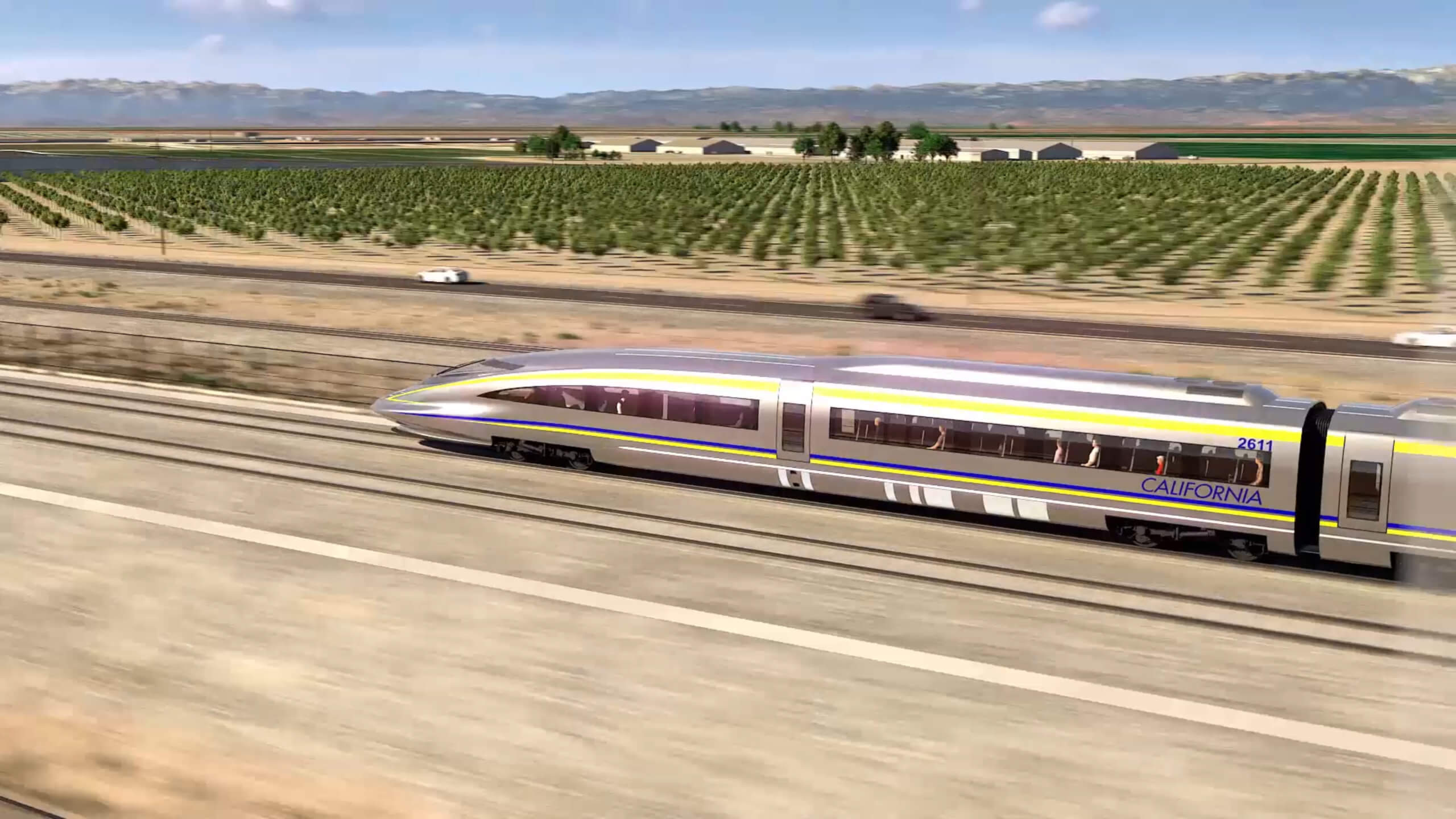
An artistic rendering of a CAHSR high-speed train running in the Central Valley. This rendering predated rolling stock selection, and is purely illustrative.

Proposition 1A sets an explicit requirement for a sustained operating speed of at least 200 miles per hour (320 km/h). The Authority plans to operate trains at 220 miles per hour (350 km/h); with a conventional 10 percent buffer for testing, this requires a top speed of at least 242 miles per hour (389 km/h). To minimize project risks, the Authority plans to acquire electric multiple units (EMUs) of service-proven design, for which there are no domestic rolling stock manufacturers. Many specifications are hence similar to those of trainsets being operated in Europe, such as: a lifespan of at least 30 years, the ability to operate two coupled trainsets as a single consist ("double heading"), a capacity of at least 450 seats and eight bicycle spots, and a length no longer than about 680 feet (210 m). Some requirements reflect American legislation or standards corresponding to the local environment, including full ADA-compliance, Tier III FRA safety standards, earthquake safety systems for safe stopping and exiting, and a floor height of 50.5 inches (128 cm) above the rails to enable level boarding.

=== Acquisition process ===
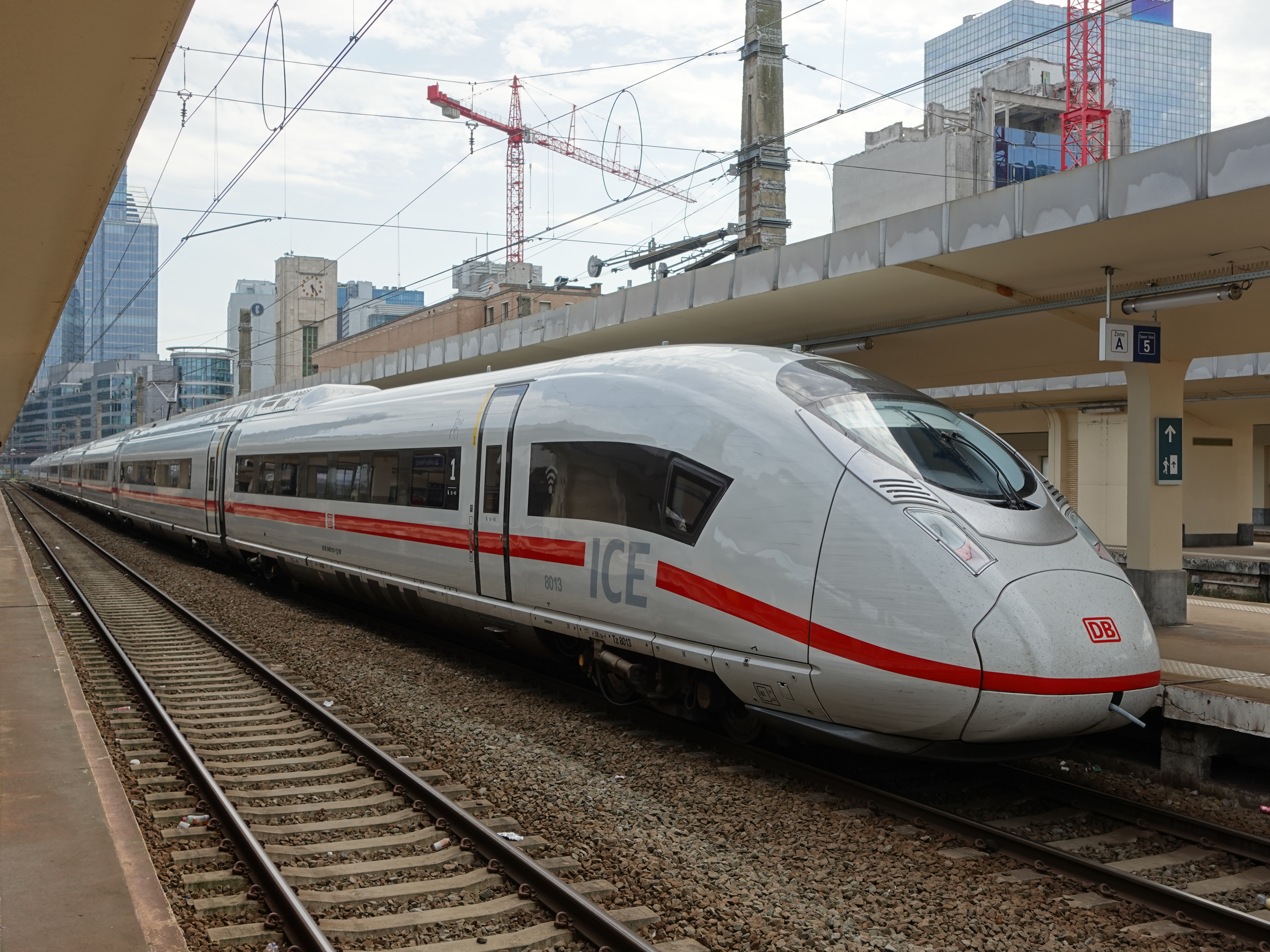
A Siemens Velaro trainset operated by Deutsche Bahn at Brussels North station

In January 2024, the Authority chose Alstom and Siemens Mobility as qualified train suppliers. The Authority released a request for proposals (RFP) in April 2024. The procurement originally called for six trainsets, with two prototype trainsets to be delivered for testing by the end of 2028 and four additional trainsets by 2030.

The Authority missed a December 31, 2024 deadline to execute the contract under its federal grant agreement. A revised deadline of December 1, 2025, also passed without a contract.

In August 2026, the Authority revised the procurement after failing to execute a contract. The revised plan calls for three initial trainsets, with options for 19 additional trainsets, and requires the initial trains to be delivered and ready for dynamic testing in the Central Valley no later than February 2030. The revisions removed federal Buy America requirements for the initial trainsets and the Authority is also considering a lease-purchase financing structure. As of October 2026, the Authority intends to purchase three 7-car Siemens American Pioneer 220 trainsets (a version of the Siemens Velaro Novo), subject to Board of Directors approval. Brightline West has ordered the same trainset.

In 2023, it was projected that for the full Phase 1 system, 66 trainsets would be needed.

== Stations and service ==
=== Stations and stop patterns ===
Proposition 1A specified up to 24 stations to be constructed on the full network. Thirteen stations are planned as part of Phase 1, of which the five on the IOS are (partially) funded. The table below lists all Phase 1 stations and their transfer connections:

List of Phase 1 stations with transfer connections
Phase		Station	Location	Transfers	Responsible authority	Status and Notes
Phase 1	Northern California	San Francisco; Salesforce Transit Center	Downtown San Francisco	AC Transit, Muni, WestCAT, GGT, and intercity bus services; Caltrain (planned extension); BART & Muni Metro (proposed walkway (Note: Salesforce Transit Center is 0.2 miles (0.32 km) away from Embarcadero station; a proposed connecting pedestrian tunnel is no longer planned.))	TJPA	Part of the independent Downtown Rail Extension (DTX, also known as The Portal) project
Phase 1	Northern California	San Francisco; 4th and King	San Francisco	Caltrain (Express, Local, Limited, Weekend Local); Muni Metro; Muni bus services	Caltrain	Interim northern terminus for CAHSR until DTX concludes, after which some CAHSR trains will stop at an adjacent planned station at 4th and Townsend
Phase 1	Northern California	Millbrae–SFO	Millbrae, San Mateo County	Caltrain (Express, Local, Limited, Weekend Local); BART; Commute.org and intercity bus services		SFO Airport connection via BART
Phase 1	Northern California	San Jose Diridon	San Jose, Santa Clara County	Amtrak (Capitol Corridor and Coast Starlight); Caltrain (Express, Local, Limited, Weekend Local, South County Connector); ACE; VTA light rail; BART (planned extension); Intercity and VTA bus services	Caltrain	
Phase 1	Northern California	Gilroy	Gilroy, Santa Clara County	Caltrain (South County Connector); Intercity, VTA and San Benito County Transit bus services	Caltrain	
Phase 1	Initial Operating Segment (IOS)	Merced	Merced, Merced County	Amtrak (Gold Runner); ACE (proposed extension)	CHSRA	Upon CAHSR being operational on the IOS, Merced will become the southern terminus of the Gold Runner service. (As of August 2025, the southern Gold Runner terminus may be Madera)
Phase 1	Initial Operating Segment (IOS)	Madera	Madera, Madera County		(SJJPA)	The SJJPA operates Amtrak's Gold Runner service. It is relocating the existing Madera station in anticipation of HSR, starting 2024
Phase 1	Initial Operating Segment (IOS)	Fresno	Fresno, Fresno County	FAX	CHSRA	
Phase 1	Initial Operating Segment (IOS)	Kings–Tulare	3 miles (4.8 km) outside Hanford, California, Kings County	/ Cross Valley Corridor (proposed service)	CHSRA	
Phase 1	Initial Operating Segment (IOS)	Bakersfield	Bakersfield, Kern County	GET Bus	CHSRA	
Phase 1	Southern California	Palmdale	Palmdale, Los Angeles County	Metrolink (Antelope Valley Line); Brightline West (proposed transfer)	CHSRA	Connection to Brightline West in the Victor Valley is proposed via the High Desert Corridor project
Phase 1	Southern California	Burbank Airport	Burbank, Los Angeles County	Metrolink (Ventura County Line); Burbank Airport	CHSRA	
Phase 1	Southern California	Los Angeles	Downtown Los Angeles	Amtrak (Coast Starlight, Pacific Surfliner, Southwest Chief, Sunset Limited, Texas Eagle); Metrolink (all services except Arrow and IEOC); Metro Rail; Metro Bus and other local and intercity bus services	LACMTA	To be converted to a through-run station under the Link US project
Phase 1	Southern California	Anaheim	Anaheim, Orange County	Amtrak (Pacific Surfliner); Metrolink (Orange County Line); OC Bus	CHSRA	

Phase 1 is planned to include several types of service – nonstop trains traveling directly between San Francisco and Los Angeles; express and limited trains making a few intermediate stops at major cities; and local trains making all stops. Prop 1A requires that the system must be designed for operating headways of five minutes or less (12 trains per hour), and that intermediate stations must be designed so nonstop trains can bypass them without slowing down. In addition, it indicates the following nonstop travel times:

- San Francisco–Los Angeles: two hours, 40 minutes
- San Francisco–San Jose: 30 minutes
- San Jose–Los Angeles: two hours, 10 minutes
- San Diego–Los Angeles: one hour, 20 minutes
- Inland Empire–Los Angeles: 30 minutes
- Sacramento–Los Angeles: two hours, 20 minutes

●	All trains stop
｜	All trains pass
	Not on route

Initial Operating Segment (IOS)

Silicon Valley–Central Valley Segment

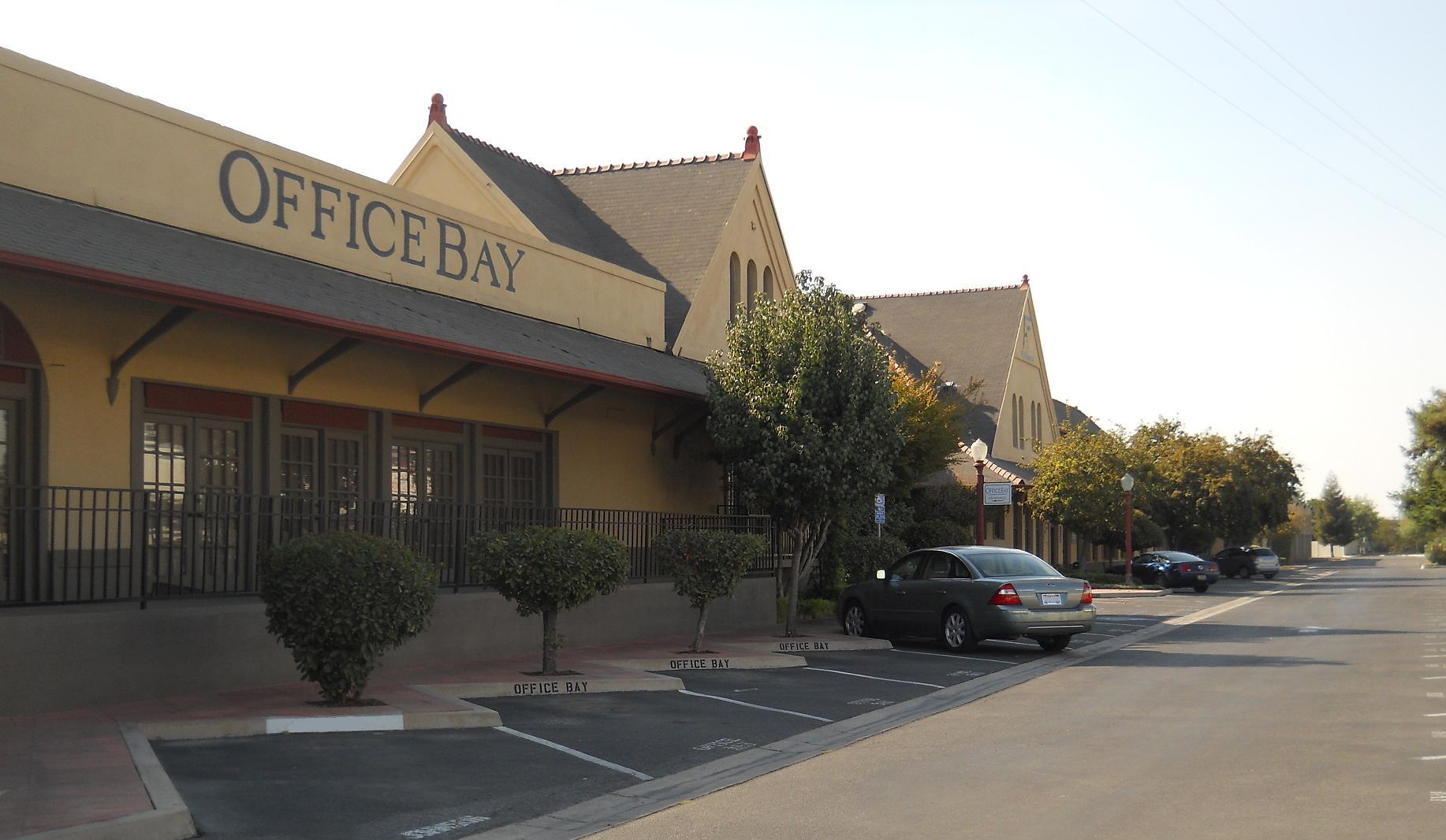
Historic Fresno station in 2014

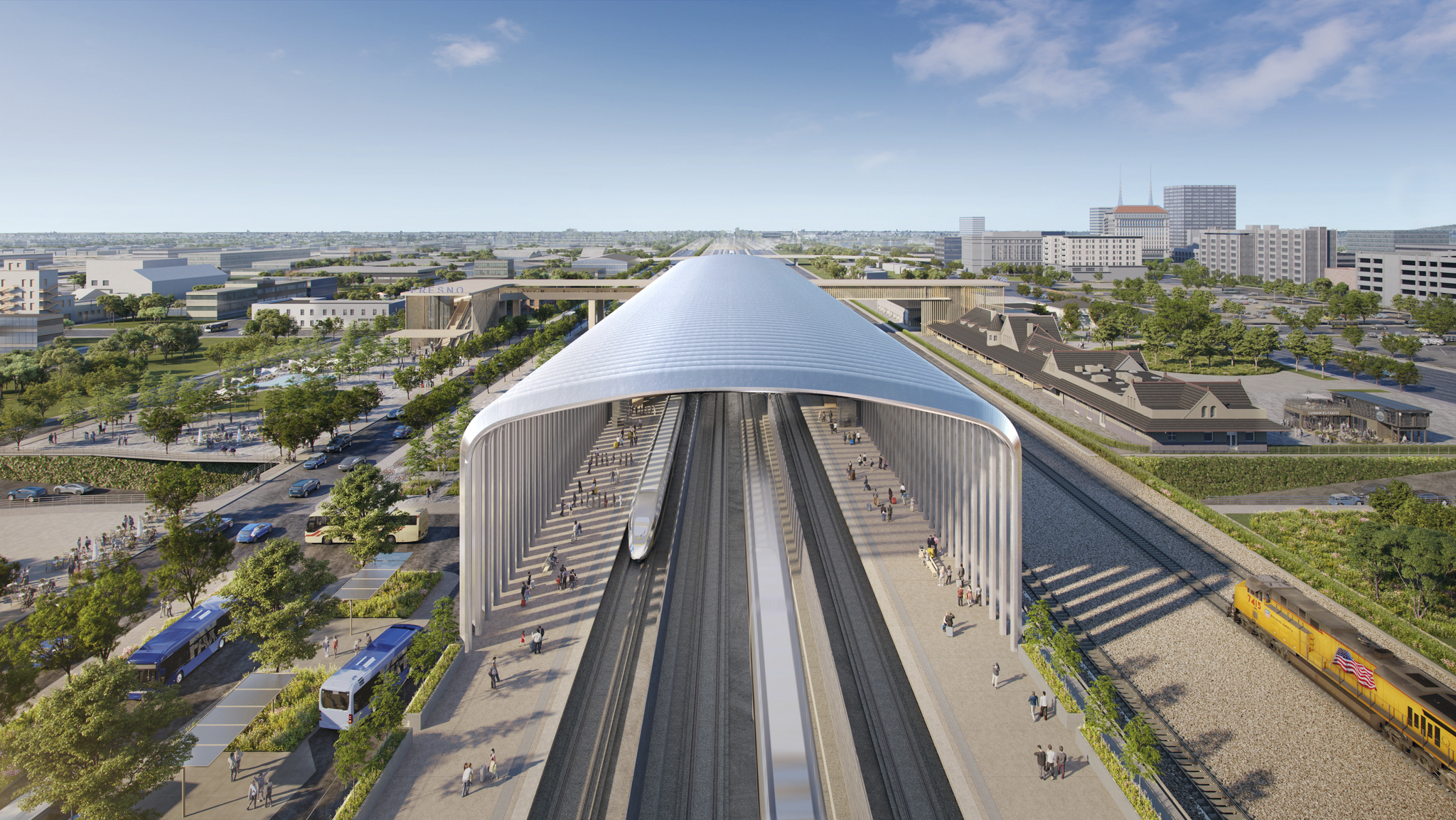
Rendering of the planned future Fresno HSR station; the old station building is on the right

Planned service patterns for Phase 1
Station	Nonstop	Express	Limited	All-stop	Merced– Anaheim	Merced– San Jose
San Francisco (Transbay)	●	●	●	●		
San Francisco (4th and Townsend)	｜	｜	●	●		
Millbrae/SFO	｜	●	●	●		
San Jose	｜	●	●	●		●
Gilroy	｜	｜	｜	●		●
Merced				(Note: San Jose–Bakersfield trains on the initial Silicon Valley to Central Valley line will call at Merced. Once Phase 1 is completed, San Francisco–Los Angeles trains will skip Merced.)	●	●
Madera	｜	｜	｜	●	●	
Fresno	｜	｜	●	●	●	
Kings–Tulare	｜	｜	｜	●	●	
Bakersfield	｜	｜	●	●	●	
Palmdale	｜	｜	｜	●	●	
Burbank Airport	｜	●	●	●	●	
Los Angeles	●	●	●	●	●	
Anaheim				●	●	

=== Operations and ridership forecast ===
In October 2017, the California High-Speed Rail Authority announced that DB E.C.O. North America, a subsidiary of German national rail operator Deutsche Bahn (DB), had been chosen as the early train operator. Its main service is consulting the Authority in matters leading up to passenger operations, such as ridership forecasts, service scheduling, and operations cost forecasting.

Ridership estimates for 2040 based on a 2023 forecast would total about 12.2 million riders annually for a Silicon Valley to Bakersfield service. For the entire Phase 1 system it projected 28.4 million riders annually, more than twice the number of annual passengers on the Northeast Corridor Amtrak services (12.1 million) in 2023.

=== Connections with other major transit projects ===
Planned intercity and commuter rail connections

Northern California

Southern California

==== Brightline West and High Desert Corridor ====
Brightline West (formerly Desert Xpress and XpressWest) is a project that has been planning to build a high-speed rail line from Las Vegas, Nevada to Victorville, California, about 90 miles (140 km) northeast of Los Angeles, since 2007. The line is intended to cross the Mojave Desert using the median of I‑15 for most of its length. The separate High Desert Corridor rail line has been proposed from Victorville to Palmdale, extending the Las Vegas line to connect with CAHSR and Metrolink. This project is managed by the High Desert Corridor Joint Powers Agency (HDC JPA). The High Desert Corridor is in a preliminary planning and project development stage with construction currently being unfunded. The HDC JPA signed two labor agreements in July 2024.

After Brightline took over the project in 2018, a separate extension was proposed to run from Victorville and terminate in Rancho Cucamonga, California, where it would connect with Metrolink but not CAHSR. In December 2023, the award of $3 billion in federal funding via the Infrastructure Investment and Jobs Act, concurrent with the $3.1 billion funding for CAHSR, enabled the project to advance. Construction of the Las Vegas to Rancho Cucamonga route began in 2024 and is projected to take approximately four years to construct.

==== Valley Rail ====
Valley Rail is a program to jointly improve rail service on the Altamont Corridor Express (ACE) and the Amtrak Gold Runner for the Central Valley, Sacramento, and the Bay Area. When the IOS goes into operation, the Amtrak Gold Runner segment currently overlapping with the IOS (Merced to Bakersfield) will be discontinued and replaced by CAHSR service. Passengers will be able to transfer at the future Merced Multi-Modal Transit Station, the northern terminus of the IOS. The remaining service will be expanded under the Valley Rail project, providing passengers with continuing transportation north and west to the Bay Area and north towards/to Sacramento. Valley Rail is currently in implementation and has an estimated completion date of 2030. The ACEforward project is further proposed to improve service in the ACE corridor.

==== Cross Valley Corridor ====
The Cross Valley Corridor (CVC) is a proposed transit line connecting Naval Air Station Lemoore and the cities Hanford, Visalia, and Porterville with the future Kings-Tulare high-speed rail station. Its route runs east–west for a total of about 80-mile (130 km), perpendicular to the high-speed rail alignment and mostly along existing rail tracks. During a first phase of up to ten years within opening of the IOS, the CVC will be implemented as a coordinated bus service by local transit agencies. In later phases, the Corridor is proposed to operate as passenger rail. The plans to activate the rail line are currently unfunded.

== Finances and cost estimates ==
=== Overview of project finances ===
The 2008 California voter approval required the project to be financed with matching funds from other sources, including private and federal. The government of Japan offered long-term, low-interest financing if California employed Shinkansen bullet-train technology.

The project is now financed mainly by the state of California, supplemented by federal grants. By the end of 2023, the share of committed funding borne by the state was 76 percent. The Authority has only one source of persistent cash flow: an annual $1 billion dollars from California cap-and-trade auctions set to expire in 2045. Before 2026, cap-and-trade funding was a fixed share of revenue. All other funding had been granted as a fixed nominal sum. This implies that if expenditures are delayed, funding does not increase to offset inflation. Headline numbers for cost estimates also depend on an assumed schedule due to inflation; compared to initial funding in Q4 2008, by Q4 2023 the national price level had increased by 39.1 percent. (Note: From St. Louis FED FRED Economic Data: 123.273/88.613 equals 1.391)

By the end of 2023, the Authority had been granted funding of $22.9 billion and expended $11.2 billion. To bring the IOS into revenue service (including trainsets, stations, and maintenance facilities) along with ongoing project development for Phase 1 and statewide connectivity programs (blended corridor investments, such as the Caltrain electrification), it estimates nominal expenditures at around $28.5–$35.3 billion, adjusted for schedule. Except for environmental clearance and investments into the blended corridors, no funding had been obtained for engineering and construction of segments outside the IOS.

=== Current status of funding and expenditure ===
The following table provides a summary over funding granted and expenditure realized by the end of 2023, as well as expected future funding and expenditure:

Funding and expenses, until December 31, 2023
Funding granted (Note: List of funding granted, but not necessarily formally appropriated. For certain state funding such as Prop 1A or federal funding such as through the IIJA, funding has to be formally appropriated in the budget by the legislature.)				Expenditure	
Amount in $ millions	Funding Program (Year granted)	Source	Conditions or Earmark	Amount in $ millions	Item
9,950	Proposition 1A (2008)	State	$950m earmarked for statewide connectivity projects (blended corridors)	211	Administrative
6,161	Cap-and-trade (2014)	State	25% of quarterly cap-and-trade auctions through 2030	745	Blended segments
3,500	ARRA and FY10 (2009)	Federal	For construction in the Central Valley only, to be completed by 2017 (later amended)	283	Support
3,300	IIJA + other (2023)	Federal	Advancement on IOS	1,436	Project Development
				8,546	Civil construction Central Valley Segment (the 119 miles (192 km) under active construction)
Total funding granted by December 31, 2023				Total expenditure by December 31, 2023	
22,911				11,182	
Expected future funding				Expected future expenditure, IOS only, in YOE$ (Note: "Year-of-expenditure" $: Expected nominal prices in the year when expenditures are made. This number hence depends on forecasted inflation and the assumed construction schedule.)	
5,250	Cap-and-trade, $750m annually (Note: The Authority was granted 25% of all future cap-and-trade proceeds from 2015 to 2030 in the 2014 California State Budget. The Authority states a low scenario as $750m in annual future revenues. According to the Capital Outlay Report, received cap-and-trade funds plus estimated future revenues total $11,686m. According to the Cash Management Report, revenue so far has been $6,161m. Their implied forecast of $5,525m in future funding hence assumes an annual cap-and-trade appropriation of $789m. For clarity, this table displays the number for $750m.)	State	–	4,463 (Note: Calculated from expected total expenditure minus expenditures so far)	Civil Construction Central Valley Segment
5,250	Cap-and-trade, $750m annually	State	–	3,172	Civil Construction Merced Extension
5,250	Cap-and-trade, $750m annually	State	–	2,301	Civil Construction Bakersfield Extension
5,250	Cap-and-trade, $750m annually	State	–	2,162	Track and Systems
5,250	Cap-and-trade, $750m annually	State	–	875	Stations
5,250	Cap-and-trade, $750m annually	State	–	379	Trainsets
5,250	Cap-and-trade, $750m annually	State	–	438	Power Systems and Operating Infrastructure
Total expected funding				Total expected expenditure for IOS completion, Phase 1 project development, and blended corridors	
28,161				28,470 (zero risk assumption); 35,323 (P65 risk assumption)	

=== Funding history ===
Proposition 1A, a 2008 state-wide ballot was the authorization by voters for the CAHSR project itself and for the sale of $9.95 billion in state bonds, to be made available to the Authority. Out of this sum, $950 million were earmarked for other passenger rail services, such as the Caltrain Electrification, to improve connection to the future high-speed rail system. Formally, bond proceeds have to be appropriated to the Authority in the California state budget. By the end of 2023, $8.516 out of $9.95 billion had been appropriated.

The second major funding infusion was a combination of federal grants in 2009, financed mainly under the American Recovery and Reinvestment Act (ARRA) for a total of $3.5 billion. However, the federal funding agreement entailed a tight schedule, targeting construction start of the Merced-Bakersfield section by 2012 and its completion by 2017. In particular, the Authority had to spend the funds in the Central Valley and expend them by September 2017 for risk of losing them. To adhere to the deadline, the Authority signed construction contracts before design, land acquisition, and utility relocations were completed. This would lead to severe disruptions during construction and delays persisting to date (see § Setbacks on the IOS).

In 2014, the California State Legislature voted to appropriate $250 million in state cap-and-trade revenue for the Authority, along with 25% of all future revenue until the end of 2030. By December 2023, it had received $11.7 billion through the cap-and-trade appropriation. Unlike all other funding, this is the only persistent income stream for the Authority. With a conservative projection of $750 million in annual revenue, the Authority expected this source to yield $5.3 billion before expiration. The legislature later extended this funding from 2030 to 2045 with a fixed $1 billion dollars a year for CAHSR.

In May 2019, the FRA under the Trump-Pence administration announced that $929 million in funding that were awarded under ARRA/FY10 in 2009 but had not yet been paid out would be withheld and cancelled. The reasons given were that the Authority had not made reasonable progress, and that the State of California under Governor Gavin Newsom abandoned the original goal of connecting San Francisco with Los Angeles, both being in violation of the federal funding agreement. In June 2021, the Biden-Harris Administration reinstated the funding.

In September 2023, the Authority obtained a $202 million FRA grant to design and construct six grade separations in Shafter, California, part of the southward extension from the initial 119 miles (192 km) towards Bakersfield. In December 2023, the Biden-Harris administration awarded the CAHSR project $3.1 billion of federal funding under another FRA grant program, making it the largest federal commitment since the ARRA-grant in 2009. The same grant also approved $3 billion for Brightline West, a similar but privately-run high speed rail project aiming to connect Los Angeles with Las Vegas. Both FRA grant programs were funded under the Infrastructure Investment and Jobs Act (IIJA).

In February 2025, the FRA under Transportation Secretary Sean P. Duffy of the Trump-Vance administration ordered a compliance review of the project. Its goal was to determine whether the Authority has been non-compliant with stipulations in agreements between the FRA and the High-Speed Rail Authority, which were accompanying two major federal grants. In June 2025, the FRA released a report on its compliance review, concluding that the Authority has been non-compliant with the grant agreements and thus recommended the termination of those grants, totaling federal obligations of around $4 billion. The report claimed that minimal progress has been made on the project, ridership forecasts have been sharply reduced, project deadlines missed, and that there was no viable path for the IOS to be in revenue service by 2033 given a $7 billion funding shortfall just for that segment. In its formal response, the Authority rejected the validity of the findings such as on minimal progress, citing 54 completed structures and 60 miles (97 km) of completed guideway as well as the completed Caltrain electrification. The rail authority further contended that the FRA under the Biden-Harris administration executed the $3 billion IIJA-grant just eight-months prior when faced with the same factual basis, and that the findings were politically predetermined given a series of prior critical public statements by President Trump and Secretary Duffy. In April 2025, the administration further cancelled $175 million for grade separation, over-crossing and design work. The state of California challenged its legality, calling the decision "illegal".

On July 16, 2025, Acting FRA Administrator Drew Feeley issued the final decision to terminate two federal grant agreements under FY10 and IIJA, which had carried a remaining federal commitment of $4 billion, marking the second attempt of an administration under Trump to cancel federal funding awarded to CAHSR. In response, the state of California under Governor Gavin Newsom filed a lawsuit with the U.S. District Court in Sacramento in the Ninth Circuit seeking declaratory and injunctive relief, alleging that the move from the federal government was a "petty, political retribution, motivated by President Trump’s personal animus". In December 2025, the state dropped its lawsuit challenging the funding rescission, and opted to move forward with the project independently, without a federal funding partner.

In September 2025, the California State Legislature voted to extend the state cap-and-trade program from 2030 to 2045, under the rebranded name "cap-and-invest". The previous 2014 appropriation, which allocated 25 percent of the revenue to high-speed rail, was changed to prioritize $1 billion annually for the project ahead of other uses of the fund. That same month, California High-Speed Rail Authority CEO Ian Choudri said the funding agreement had resolved all identified funding gaps for the Central Valley Early Operating Segment. However, in July 2026, the Office of the Inspector General reported that the Authority would need financing against future revenues to maintain its construction schedule for the reduced-scope Merced–Bakersfield segment. Without such financing, the Authority could exhaust funds available for scheduled construction as soon as December 2027. The Authority projected funding gaps totaling approximately $9.5 billion over fiscal years 2027–28 through 2031–32. The OIG also estimated financing costs of $3.6 billion to $6.6 billion, depending on the financing mechanism.

=== Current cost estimates ===
The table below shows capital cost estimates as of 2026 for the active project scope of the Authority: putting the 171-mile (275 km) IOS into revenue service by 2030–2033, investments into blended corridors, and project development such as environmental clearance of Phase 1. Unfunded segments are listed in the next table.

2026 capital cost estimates and expenditures for IOS + advance Phase 1 work (year of expenditure $, in billions)
Scope Element	Estimated	Expenditures up to December 2026
Central Valley segment 119 miles (192 km)	20.12	12.13
Project development	0.13	0.13
Merced extension	3.27	0.11
Bakersfield extension	1.88	0.08
Stations	1.10	0.06
Tracks and Systems and Commodities Balance	1.43	0
Trainsets and Facilities	0.98	0
Solar	0.16	0
Program Wide Support and Contingency Balance	1.726	.60
Subtotal, Merced to Bakersfield	30.78	13.10
Project Development (Phase 1)	0.54	0.52
Program Wide Support and Other	2.14	0.34
Bookend (Caltrain Electrification, San Mateo Grade Separation, Rosecrans/Maquardt Grade Separation, Los Angeles Union Station)	1.30	0.85
Active project scope	32.1	14.82

The next table displays capital cost estimates for the full Phase 1. Cost uncertainty for unfunded segments remains high, as preparatory work that can inform cost estimates have not yet been undertaken. Major steps for those would be: environmental clearance to determine the final alignment and necessary mitigation measures, preliminary engineering and geotechnical studies, and advanced design. However, the estimated ranges below do not factor in cost revisions that are expected to occur upon environmental clearance for two sections in Southern California (Palmdale to Burbank, and Los Angeles to Anaheim), (Note: "The $128 billion price tag does not include cost updates for two separate segments between Palmdale and Anaheim, because the rail authority in the past has not updated costs until it completes environmental assessments. There could be additional jolts of sticker shock when those costs are added in the future.") planned for the end of 2025. Similarly, the extensive tunnels on the Northern and Southern California segments require geotechnical studies and engineering to inform more precise cost estimates, but those have not yet been funded.

2026 capital cost estimates for full Phase 1 (year of expenditure $, in billions)
Risk Scenario	Draft 2026 Business Plan Estimates (year of expenditure $, billions)
Northern California; San Francisco to Merced	19.89
Initial Operating Segment (IOS); Merced to Bakersfield	31.68
Southern California; Bakersfield to Anaheim	50.76
Program Wide; Support, Trainsets, Other Balance	19.51
Full Phase 1	126.2

partially funded and underway

=== Past cost estimates ===
Cost estimates have increased significantly since program inception. In the first business plan of 2008, the cost estimate for civil construction of the Merced-Bakersfield section, now termed the IOS, was $6.2 billion ($9.3 billion in 2025). The same scope of work was projected to be $30.5 billion in 2024. (Note: The 2008 estimate included structures, stations, tracks, and power systems. Trainsets and maintenance facilities were not included. The given 2024 number reflects the same scope, for comparison.) The initial 2008 total cost estimate for Phase 1, developed by consultants WSP USA for the Authority and presented to voters, was $45 billion ($67.3 billion in 2025). No timeline for completion was presented to voters, but the Authority initially anticipated a possible completion date by 2020. At that time, when the project was voted on in Proposition 1A, the alignment was not specified yet and no major engineering had been undertaken to inform those estimates. By 2024, this forecast had risen to $106.2 billion.

Regular public controversy about project cost increases is centered around the latter headline number for the total cost of Phase 1. Up until 2016, cost estimates were reported as nominal prices, only subject to overall inflation. Since 2018, these estimates have been reported in terms of years-of-expenditure. This means that total expenditure is calculated as a sum of expense flows, with each expense being inflated forward to the year in which the expense is expected to occur. Hence, since 2018, the commonly discussed increase in headline costs reflects a combination of increases in real costs, overall inflation, and push-backs in the expense schedule. The table below hints at the difference between current-year prices and year-of-expenditure prices by showing the estimates in 2018 for both.

The table shows the evolution of cost estimates made by the Authority over a period spanning project inception in 2008 up to 2024. These numbers are reported in biannual business plans, which the Authority is mandated to report to the California legislature. Each row states cost estimates of civil construction for one section. For most years, this includes grade separations, guideway, tracks, and systems. The bottom row sums over all sections and additionally includes program-wide non-construction capital costs, such as trainsets and maintenance facilities. (Note: Segment and project scope definitions changed over the years, such as whether trainsets and stations are included or not. Hence, the definitions in this table may not be exactly constant. The exposition here is intended to provide a rough indication of cost developments.)

Capital cost estimates made by the California High-Speed Rail Authority over the years 2008–2024 (in $ billions, nominal prices) (Note: Scope per segment may change over the years. For example, the inclusion of a second track is part of costs for Merced to Bakersfield in some years, but not in others. When a cost range is given, the point estimate in this table is chosen to be the midpoint, for exposition.)
	Segment (Note: Precise segments may change definition across years, such as San Jose to Merced vs. to Central Valley Wye)	2008	2012	2014	2016	2018	2018	2020	2022	2024	2025
	Price Level	2008	2011	2015	2015	2017	YOE (Note: "Year of Expenditure")	YOE	YOE	YOE	YOE
Northern California	San Francisco to San Jose	4.2	5.6	6.0	3.1	2.4	2.1	1.6	1.7	5.0 (Note: Includes funded investment into Caltrain electrification)	19.30 (Note: Cost for the San Jose to Gilroy segment is not included, estimates for that project range from $2 billion to $5 billion)
Northern California	San Jose to Merced	5.2	15.1	14.7	9.9	13.9 (Note: Calculated as the sum of segments: San Jose to Gilroy, Gilroy to Carlucci Road, Carlucci Road to Madera Acres (Wye Leg 2))	15.8	15.8	21.9	21.9	19.30
IOS	Merced to Fresno	2.0	5.3	4.1	3.8	14.8 (Note: Calculated as the sum of segments: Merced to Wye Legs 1, Wye Legs 1, Madera Acres to Poplar Avenue, Poplar Avenue to Bakersfield)	unknown (Note: Project segments change definition over the years; the 2018 business plan does not show numbers in YOE that allow for a calculation of the 171 miles (275 km) now defined as the IOS. The cost for 119 miles (192 km) was given as $10.6 billion.)	23.1	23.2	29.8	31.69
IOS	Fresno to Bakersfield	4.2	6.8	7.3	8.3	14.8	unknown	23.1	23.2	29.8	31.69
Southern California	Bakersfield to Palmdale	3.9	7.7	8.3	9.7	12.3	16.3	15.7	18.4	17.1	25.60
Southern California	Palmdale to Los Angeles	5.4	13.1	13.5	13.5	16.1	17.5	18.1	19.7	19.7	N/A
Southern California	Los Angeles to Anaheim	2.0	0.5	0.5	2.3	3.0	3.6	2.9	2.9	2.9	N/A
Program Wide Costs											14.26
	Full Phase 1 including non-construction costs (Note: Segment-wise civil construction costs may not sum to this total due to (i) rounding (ii) program-wide non-construction capital costs such as trainsets and maintenance facilities. These may be accounted for in construction sections in some years, and as a separate category in others.)	33.2	53.4	58.6	55.3	67.5	77.3	83.0	93.5	106.2	90.8 (not including Palmdale to Anaheim)

substantially funded and underway

Although price levels for projects around the world are not directly comparable due to differing topographies, required mitigations measures, and construction prices, high-speed rail projects in Europe with similar timelines have also experienced significant cost increases since those were proposed: A 37.1-mile (59.7 km) high-speed line in Southern Germany that opened in 2022 saw its budget nearly double, from €2.03 billion in 2009 to €3.99 billion by 2022. High Speed 2, a 140-mile (230 km) high-speed line currently under construction in the United Kingdom that will connect London with Birmingham, has seen its headline cost almost quadruple, from £15.8–17.4 billion in 2010 up to possibly £66 billion by January 2024. Construction inflation was cited as the main reason for recent cost increases, with prices for steel, rebar, and concrete having risen by 47, 53, and 48 percent respectively during the period since the COVID-19 pandemic.

Similar cost increases have occurred on major California infrastructure projects in the 21st century when faced with similar challenges like the CAHSR project. The Bay Bridge replacement span increased from an initial $1 billion in 1996 (Note: Original plans for the Bay Bridge, which was damaged in the 1989 Loma Prieta earthquake, were to retrofit the structure for about $250 million, but later studies favored constructing a new bridge which was initially budgeted at $1 billion in 1996.) to $6.5 billion by 2013, due to initial estimates being made before detailed engineering studies, and due to inflation in the cost of labor and building materials. The cost of widening a 10-mile (16 km) section of I-405 in Sepulveda Pass rose from $1 billion in 2010 to $1.6 billion in 2016, due to "repeated changes to the project's design and failure to identify and relocate utilities." The cost of the planned 6-mile (9.7 km) long third phase of the Silicon Valley BART extension rose from $4.7 billion in 2014 to $12.2 billion in 2024, due to years of delays and inflation, and to design changes following complaints from property owners along the route.

In 2023, the Authority published a major cost revision for putting the IOS into revenue service, significantly increasing estimates from $23.4 billion in its 2022 business plan to a range of $26.2–33 billion, depending on the degree of confidence. Including past and future expenses outside the IOS, total expenditure of the California High-Speed Rail Authority would increase from $25.7 billion to a range of $28.5–35.3 billion. This increase of potentially up to $9.7 billion, or 37 percent, was explained with the following major factors: $2.1 billion, or 21 percent of the increase, were attributable to delays in schedule combined with inflation; (Note: General price increases in the construction sector significantly outpaced consumer price inflation since Covid.) $3.9 billion, or 40 percent of the increase, were supposedly due to changes in scope, such as building stations in downtown Merced and Bakersfield upon stakeholder agreement, rather than stopping trains further outside the city centers; and the remaining $3.7 billion, or 39 percent of the increase, were added as risk contingencies for the higher risk scenario, along with other unspecified elements related to the first two factors.

== Setbacks and challenges ==
=== Land acquisition issues ===
The major factor contributing to delays and cost overruns has been the difficulty in acquiring land parcels necessary for construction. In order for actual construction of structures such as grade separations, trenches, and viaducts to start, land for both the structures themselves and for access and logistics have to be secured; utilities (electric, telecommunications, gas, and wet) moved; and impact on existing traffic mitigated, such as by temporarily or permanently relocating busy roads or freight rail tracks. (Note: The following example illustrates the sequence of pre-construction activities and its sensitivity to delay: "The state, for example, has failed to acquire a piece of land from Smart & Final, a grocery chain, at a city corner, delaying relocation of a gas line. The removal of the gas line in turn has delayed construction of temporary freight track, called a shoofly, for Union Pacific Railroad. The shoofly is necessary to allow construction of underpasses and bridges at three major streets near downtown".) In 2012, the Authority decided to issue construction contracts, even though design was only 15% complete, partially to comply with spending deadlines for the ARRA funding. However, this implied that the final sizes of bridges, overpasses and track beds were unknown, leading to incomplete identification of land rights to be secured.

By January 2013, the state had not acquired a single parcel, delaying overall construction start to 2015. By 2019, less than 310 parcels out of 1859 required had been acquired. The number of parcels necessary was underestimated due to the extent of utility conflicts being larger than the Authority anticipated. Land conveyance processes were further complicated due to incomplete records kept by utility companies like PG&E on precise utility locations and easement rights. In hundreds of cases, the Authority was forced to buy entire plots of land, even though only a portion of its right-of-way was required.

By 2021, the targeted completion date as communicated by the Authority to the legislature had been pushed back to 2023, but land acquisition issues were still holding up construction. As part of renegotiations about delay-induced costs, the general contractor for Construction Package 1 (CP1), American construction firm Tutor Perini, wrote a letter to the Authority complaining that "[it] is beyond comprehension [...] that the authority has not obtained all of the right of way". That letter cited further problems such as rapid turnover of state officials and the state's failure to secure agreements with outside parties, including utilities and freight railroads – the latter of which were in turn criticized for their “preferential and unreasonable demands”.

The initial bid for CP1 of just under $1 billion had ballooned to $2.2 billion in the meanwhile, mostly due to delay claims and change orders. The Authority disputed assertions made in the letter, with then-CEO Brian Kelly responding that those were "attempts to set out why project challenges are everybody else's fault". A similar letter was sent by the main contractor for Construction Package 2–3 (CP2-3), Spanish construction firm Dragados, warning of further delays to at least 2025 due to land conveyance issues.

By December 2023, 2,258 out of 2,295 required parcels (98 percent) on the 119 miles (192 km) under active construction had been acquired, shifting the major source of hold-up risk to outstanding utility relocations. On CP1, 18 percent of utility relocations had not yet been started, and 20 percent for CP2-3. Both construction packages have a scheduled completion date at the end of 2026. The southernmost active segment, Construction Package 4 (CP4) under Spanish infrastructure firm Ferrovial as main contractor, has almost finished civil construction, barring a single outstanding canal relocation. For the remaining segments of the IOS not yet under construction then, which are 52 miles (84 km) of extensions into Merced and Bakersfield, the Authority plans to initiate construction only after fully completing design and land acquisition.

=== Project Management Reforms and Oversight ===
Following delays and cost increases during early construction, California implemented several changes to the oversight and management of the high-speed rail project. A 2018 audit by the California State Auditor concluded that the California High-Speed Rail Authority had begun Central Valley construction before acquiring sufficient right-of-way transportation, completing utility-relocation planning, and reaching necessary agreements with outside parties. The audit found that these risks contributed to more than $600 million in construction contract changes at the time and projected additional costs as construction continued.

In response, the Authority established prerequisites for future construction contracts involving right-of-way acquisition, utility relocation, and agreements with local governments and railroad operators. The State Auditor subsequently classified this recommendation as fully implemented. The state also expanded independent oversight of the project. Legislation enacted in 2022 created an independent Office of the Inspector General for the high-speed rail program, with authority to review the Authority’s plans, contracts, and project management practices.

Continuing oversight has focused on the reliability of the project’s funding and schedule estimates. In its review of the project’s 2023 update, the California Legislative Analyst’s Office stated that lawmakers could benefit from additional independent analysis of the project’s revised ridership estimates, costs, potential cost reductions, and funding options. The Office of the Inspector General has subsequently conducted reviews of funding, scheduling, procurement, and pre-construction activities for the Merced-to-Bakersfield segment.

In September 2026, the Office of the Inspector General substantiated allegations that the Authority had failed to comply with state regulations and contract requirements governing travel reimbursements for consultants. Of approximately $1.15 million in travel expenses reviewed for compliance with advance-approval requirements, $800,900, or 69 percent, lacked documented advance approval. The OIG also found that contract managers appeared to have little functional authority to approve or deny consultant travel, despite contract terms and Authority policy assigning them that responsibility. The Authority said it would implement some of the OIG's recommended corrective actions and partially implement others, including reviewing travel claims and seeking reimbursement for unallowable expenses.

=== Underestimates ===
The location of construction packages on the IOS

The voter information for Prop 1A included an estimate of $45 billion (current 2008 dollars) for a statewide vision of high speed rail. This initial appraisal was not based on any specific right-of-ways, stations, routes, right-of-way blending, or construction phases.

The first cost estimate provided for the eventual "Phase 1" system – with most of its currently designated stations, and blended "bookends" – was published in the Authority's Revised 2012 Business Plan. The estimate in this document for the construction of the blended Phase 1 system was $68.4 billion. As planning progressed on the Central Valley Initial Operation Segment, ongoing cost revisions considered necessary construction of viaducts to cross multiple freight railroads (owned by BNSF and UPRR), floodplains, and irrigation canals. Even at this point, design was only at 15 percent and environmental clearance incomplete, leaving final community and environmental mitigation measures unspecified. As land acquisition progressed during construction, it emerged that the Authority had underestimated the quantity of parcels needed for its right-of-way and associated utility relocations, as well as their prices.

In 2013, the contract for Construction Package 1 (CP1), the northernmost section of the 119 miles (192 km) under active construction covering 29 miles (47 km) from Madera to south of Fresno, was awarded to a joint venture between the firms Tutor Perini, Zachry, and Parsons for a winning bid of $985 million, below the second-lowest bid of $1.09 billion and below Authority staff estimates of $1.2–1.8 billion. Allegations were raised about deliberate lowballing practices by the lead firm Tutor Perini, which would subsequently lead to predictable cost overruns.

Media reports cited that 11 major projects completed by the firm in the past 12 years ended up with costs 40 percent above initial bids. CEO Ron Tutor disputed the allegations, claiming that cost overruns were caused by owner-initiated change orders. He anticipated that potential change orders for the CAHSR project in case of land conveyance issues could cause construction delays and cost increases, but that "[t]hese aren't huge. They are not major. They are nothing extensive. [...] and it never spirals out of control.”

The Tutor Perini bid was initially eliminated as it received the lowest technical score from Authority staff for safety, design, engineering, and scheduling. A mid-evaluation rule change allowed the bid to proceed. Concerns about the contract award prompted a congressional hearing. As of December 2023, the CP1 contract had $2.4 billion in approved invoices, those being 67% of total expected expenses.

In 2014, the contract for Construction Package 2–3 (CP2-3), a 65 miles (105 km) section leading from south of Fresno to near the Kings and Tulare county border, was awarded to a joint venture between Spanish construction firm Dragados and Hochtief subsidiary Flatiron Construction with a winning bid of $1.2 billion. This number was significantly below the $1.5–2 billion expected by Authority staff and Tutor Perini's second-lowest bid of $1.7 billion.

A 2021 report by Ralph Vartabedian for the Los Angeles Times documented severe underestimation on the part of the contractor: Authority staff and their consultants had prepared environmental reports prior to contract award, noting challenges with a complicated landscape of creek beds and wildlife habitats in Kings County. They proposed solutions such as an elevated platform for the future Hanford station or a 2-mile (3.2 km) viaduct over several Kings River waterways crossing the alignment.

In their bid submission, lead firm Dragados suggested cost-saving measures such as replacing the viaduct with 13 box culverts or replacing the elevated platform at Hanford with a ground-level guideway. During construction, it became clear that the contractor had underestimated the complexity of their proposals: A planned freight railroad relocation could not be undertaken as no agreement with UPRR was reached, a planned freeway relocation into a trench was not feasible, the California Department of Fish and Wildlife dismissed the alternative designs for the Kings River Viaduct, and the Kings–Tulare Regional Station at Hanford had to be elevated onto a lengthy viaduct after all.

By 2021, the Authority had approved 273 change orders for CP2-3 and agreed to pay $800 million in additional costs, marking an increase of 62 percent over the initial bid. During the bidding process, the Authority decided that prospective bidders may disregard a pending geotechnical report on land subsidence due to groundwater pumping. The report was finished in 2017 and noted increased flooding risks. Of the cost increases by 2021, $101 million was attributable to change orders for elevated embankments. By December 2023, the CP2-3 contract had $2.4 billion in approved invoices, representing 72 percent of total expenditure.

By early 2026, the California High-Speed Rail Authority had approved 597 change orders for Construction Packages 2–3, totaling $2.32 billion. In April 2026, the Authority's board approved Change Order 427 with Dragados/Flatiron for $537.3 million to settle a number of outstanding change-order proposals, claims and disputes, and implement changes aimed at completing the CP2-3 guideway by the end of 2026.

=== Freight railroad companies ===
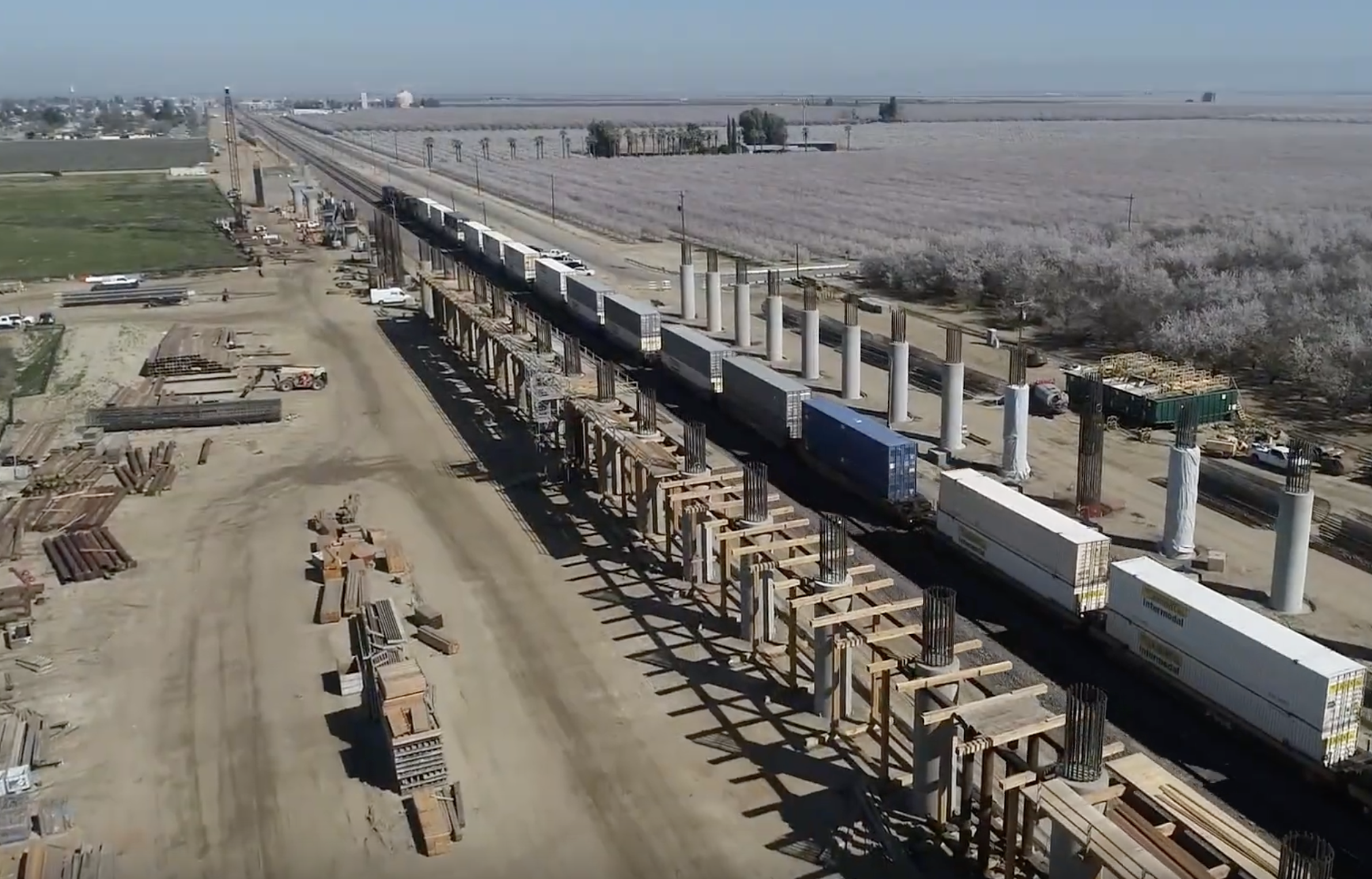
The Wasco Viaduct, under construction in 2020. A BNSF freight train is passing underneath the then-future pergola.

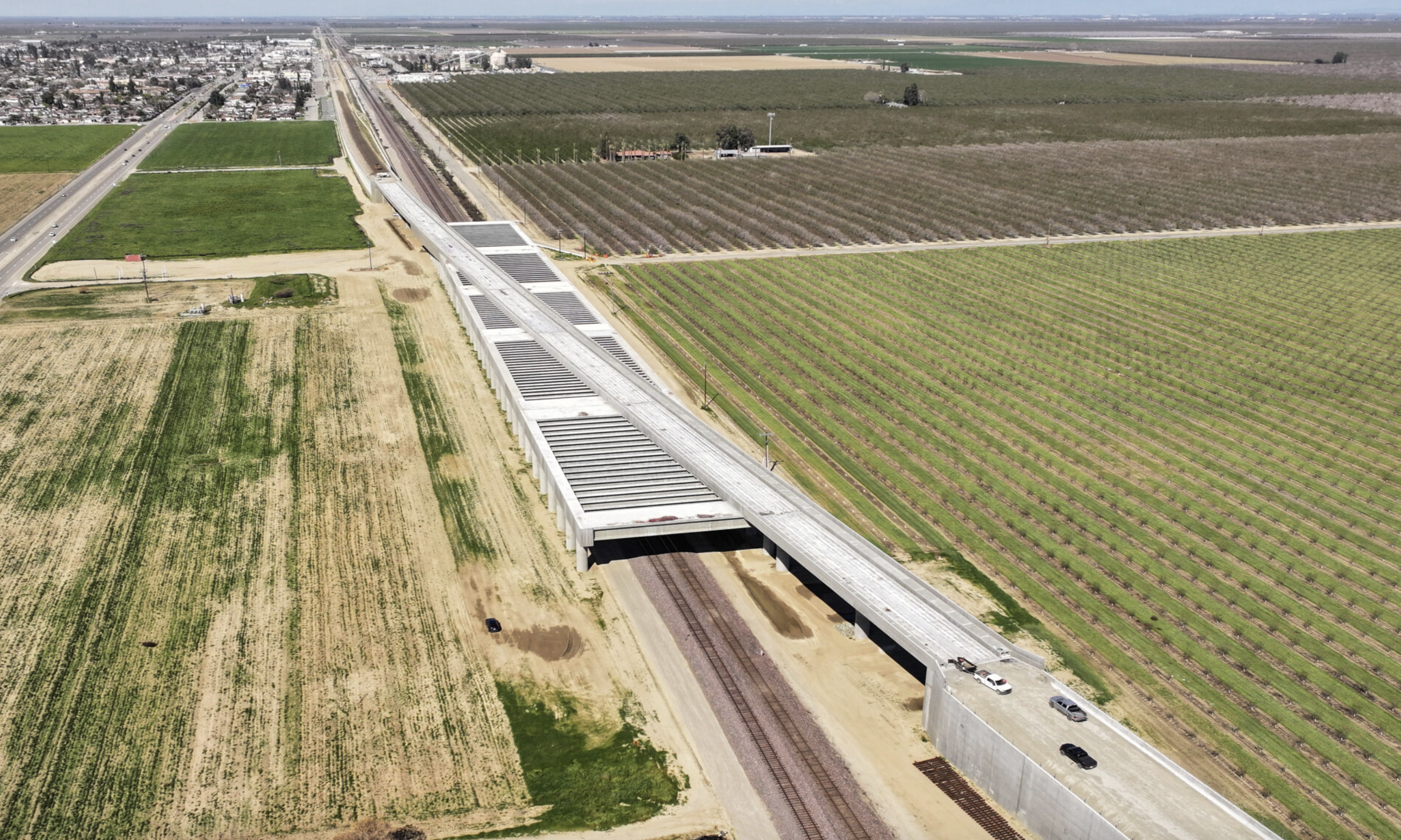
Finished viaduct in 2024.

The high-speed rail alignment shares substantial parts of its corridor with existing freight railroads. Construction activity that affects them are subject to their approval. These third-party hold-ups can cause disruptions to Authority contractors' work sequence, which are exacerbated by any Authority-initiated design changes. For example, the construction of a road underpass in downtown Fresno required also building a bridge for existing Union Pacific tracks and their temporary relocation ("shoo-fly"). According to CHSRA officials, it took nine iterations of design reviews to obtain approval, with each step taking about 45 days. Freight railway companies are further able to order construction stops at or near their railroads during peak shipping season in the fourth quarter of each year, thus narrowing the window for construction.

In places where the CAHSR alignment runs close to freight rail lines, such as in downtown Fresno for substantial lengths, safety measures are mandated to protect both lines from a derailment in the other. This resulted in a requirement for the Authority to construct costly intrusion protection barriers – thick walls made out of steel reinforced concrete – to separate its guideway from freight lines. According to the Authority, a final agreement with the FRA and the affected freight rail companies BNSF and Union Pacific on technical specifications for such barriers was reached only in December 2016, well after construction contracts had been issued. The Authority is required to pay all costs for intrusion protection barriers, causing 20 change orders totaling about 500 million dollars in additional costs.

=== Legal challenges ===
Hanford-based farmers John Tos and Aaron Fukuda, leading a protest group called Citizens for California High Speed Rail Accountability, began a decade-long series of legal challenges alongside the Kings County Board of Supervisors against the California High-Speed Rail Authority when they jointly filed a lawsuit in 2011, alleging that the project violated Proposition 1A funding requirements. They oppose the rail project because the alignment would run through their fields, requiring them to sell some of their land for construction and causing a lengthy detour to access other parts. According to Fukuda, “it's not about the money, it's about the crops and the land that are our livelihood.” City officials and residents from the nearby city of Visalia on the other hand were welcoming of the high-speed rail project, seeing it as a much needed economic opportunity.

In 2013, the group achieved temporary success, when Sacramento County Superior Court Judge Michael Kinney ruled partially in favor of one of their lawsuits that was trying to block the Authority from accessing bond funds authorized via Prop 1A. The Authority's funding plan was deemed flawed due to insufficiently identifying funding needed for construction, thus violating requirements set in the ballot measure. Stuart Flashman, the lawyer who would represent this group in their series of lawsuits against the Authority, stated that “the point of this [lawsuit] was to prevent the state from moving forward and starting construction on a project they couldn't finish”.

In 2014, Kings County refused the Authority access to county-owned property, where it intended to drill for soil samples as part of a study on land subsidence. A court ordered the county to grant access, but the dispute nonetheless caused delays in obtaining environmental clearance, which was still outstanding at the time. In the same year, seven lawsuits were filed against the Authority by various cities, businesses and associations, stating that its environmental statement finalized in May 2014 violated the California Environmental Quality Act (CEQA). All these would eventually be dropped or settled, with Kings County being the last one in 2019. In July 2014, the Third District Court of Appeal reversed the 2013 decision of the Sacramento County Superior Court. In 2016, the remaining part of the lawsuit that argued via Prop 1A requirements was dismissed. Kings County Supervisor Doug Verboon, one of the plaintiffs, stated that "it's all about making them accountable, and not being a waste of taxpayer dollars."

In 2017, the California Supreme Court ruled in another case that federal regulations of the Surface Transportation Board do not categorically preempt projects such as CAHSR from compliance with stricter state environmental laws. This decision meant that the Authority is not exempt from having legal injunctions filed against it based on CEQA; these could force a halt to construction while such CEQA claims are being resolved.

In 2018, Sacramento County Superior Court Judge Richard K. Sueyoshi issued a ruling dismissing another lawsuit by the group. It had asserted that Assembly Bill 1889, passed in 2016 to further specify requirements previously laid out in Prop 1A, was an unconstitutional modification of a voter-approved act. In 2021, a state appeals court affirmed the prior ruling. In 2022, the State Supreme Court denied hearing an appeal, ending John Tos' decade-long series of lawsuits.

In February 2022, Hollywood Burbank Airport sued the Authority over its then upcoming environmental statement for the unfunded Burbank to Los Angeles segment. Those plans called for an underground high-speed rail station connecting to the airport. Airport officials were worried about impacts on their operations and safety during construction, arguing that the report did not analyze these potential impacts and hence violated CEQA. The lawsuit delayed environmental clearance, and if successful could have required a costly new environmental process to determine a different rail alignment. In November 2023, both parties reached a settlement that included dismissal of the lawsuit and compensation to the airport for its legal expenses.

=== Other ===
The Central Valley with its agricultural focus relies on irrigation canals. These are usually dry from March to September, providing the Authority with a time window of six months per year to conduct work on canal relocations or bridging structures. In the spring of 2023, the Central Valley around the city of Corcoran was flooded due to unusual amounts of rain and melting snow. Some major work sites were completely flooded and unreachable, causing work to halt. The structures themselves are designed to withstand 100-year floods. Further delays were caused due to emergency measures to support affected communities: A road that had been dug up to be replaced with an overcrossing was repaved to provide access to cut-off residents.

== Political perspectives ==
=== Support ===
Since the project's inception, multiple California governors have supported the project. Jerry Brown stated in 2012: "During the 1930's [sic], the Central Valley Water Project was called a 'fantastic dream' that 'will not work.' The Master Plan for the Interstate Highway System in 1939 was derided as 'New Deal jitterbug economics. ... The critics were wrong then and they're wrong now." In a 2022 interview, Arnold Schwarzenegger criticized the "political provincialism" affecting the project, "You look at the world and very rarely is any system very profitable. ... When we build schools, we don't look like, 'How do we make a big buck out of this whole thing?"

In his February 2019 State of the State address, California Governor Gavin Newsom said: "Let's be real. ... The project, as currently planned, would cost too much and take too long. ... Right now, there simply isn't a path to get from Sacramento to San Diego, let alone from San Francisco to L.A. I wish there were." While Newsom said he supported completing the IOS between Merced and Bakersfield and continuing planning for the rest of the route, work beyond that scope would be put on hold until funding issues could be resolved. He then stated, "The project can still be achieved... But let's be honest about the trade-offs and let's be honest about the cost."

Ray LaHood, former United States Secretary of Transportation and Republican congressman who oversaw federal grants to CAHSR under the Obama administration, stated that "When California is finished, it will end up being a good investment. People will use it. ... For politicians to turn a blind eye to what the people want, it's just not right." Congressman Jim Costa, one of the original authors of Prop 1A and who continues to seek project funding, wrote: "High-speed rail is a modern solution to California's transportation needs, and dismissing it as a pipe dream, or as a romantic concept, will only lead to continued congestion on our roads and delays in our skies."

Other supporters include local governments along the route, business groups, and labor unions. In 2024, Fresno mayor Jerry Dyer described high-speed rail as "a game-changer for the Valley and for Fresno," while Merced deputy city manager Frank Quintero called it "a major economic catalyst." Jeremy Smith, of the State Building and Construction Trades Council, said, "We should not forget that this type of project is exactly what workers in the construction industry need from their government in times of recession, like times we find ourselves in now." This support has also come from local elected Republicans, highlighting the project's bipartisan appeal in the Central Valley despite political divisions at the state and federal levels.

=== Opposition ===
California Republicans have generally opposed the project. Congressman Kevin McCarthy (R-Bakersfield), a native of Bakersfield, stated that he would "do whatever I can to ensure that not one dollar of federal funds is directed to this project", a few days before becoming House majority leader. McCarthy has often pushed for redirecting high-speed rail funding to water projects in the Central Valley. In the wake of economic difficulties brought by the COVID-19 pandemic, State Senator Brian Dahle (R-Bieber) remarked, "The project is way underfunded and we're never going to be able to finish it... Sometimes you've got to cut your losses, and it's time to cut our losses." Vince Fong (R-Bakersfield) has also been a vocal opponent, stating in 2020, "We need to seriously reevaluate High Speed Rail funding, especially when this state is asking Californians to make real sacrifices," in regard to "[proposed] cuts to education, healthcare programs, and diverting road funds to address our budget deficit."

A number of California Democrats have also expressed doubts about the project. In 2012, State Senator Joe Simitian (D-Palo Alto) asked, "Is there additional commitment of federal funds? There is not. Is there additional commitment of private funding? There is not. Is there a dedicated funding source that we can look to in the coming years? There is not." In 2020, Toni Atkins (D-San Diego) stated, "I want to see high-speed rail move forward only in a way that is responsible and in keeping with what we told the voters we would do."

Many advocacy groups have also opposed the project or criticized its management and implementation. The libertarian Reason Foundation wrote in 2008: "It is possible that HSR can serve legitimate public and environmental purposes and be a financial success in California. However, the current CHSRA proposal cannot achieve such objectives," calling attention to issues such as "questionable ridership projections and cost assumptions" and "virtually no objective analysis about risks and uncertainties." In 2015, the Train Riders Association of California described the high-speed rail project as "throwing good money after bad" and argued that upgrading the existing Pacific Surfliner and Gold Runner services would provide more benefits per dollar.

While the environmentalist organization Sierra Club initially supported the project, they shifted to opposing it in 2014, arguing that California should prioritize spending on other efforts to fight climate change, as high-speed rail's benefits would take decades to realize. Many agricultural interests along the proposed route have also opposed the project due to its potential impact on farming operations and the use of eminent domain.

In February 2025, President Donald Trump stated he would investigate California's High-Speed Rail Authority, suggesting possible issues in its management and oversight. In response, state officials dismissed his comments as unhelpful, labeling them as 'noise'.

=== Legislative oversight ===
In 2011 the California Legislative Analyst's Office (LAO) published a report regarding management issues with the project, citing that plans to obtain future funding were inadequate and were a risk to the project's future viability. The LAO recommended that the state seek flexibility with the use of federal funds, most of which was required to be used on the Merced–Bakersfield segment, and recommended the state pursue other corridors in the Bay Area and Los Angeles that could provide more immediate benefits. They also criticized the Authority's heavy reliance on private consultants, which increased costs and complicated management.

As part of its 2012 funding package, Senate Bill 1029 required the California High-Speed Rail Authority to submit biennial reports to the Legislature detailing the project's financial status, construction progress, and operational plans. The mandate was intended to increase legislative oversight and ensure greater accountability in the project's long-term planning and spending.

In 2012, the California High-Speed Rail Peer Review Group – an independent panel established by the California Legislature to provide oversight of the high-speed rail project – advised the state not to sell bonds funding the project unless funding issues were addressed. The group wrote that continuing the high-speed rail project without a solid plan to secure future funding represented a financial risk to California. The peer review group published an updated analysis in 2022, noting that the project had made significant progress on environmental clearance and addressed many of its management issues; however, "overall project funding remains inadequate and unstable making effective management extremely difficult". It called future cost estimates into question as those sections had not yet been bid on, and that the Authority lacked contract management experiences with key portions of those sections (such as tunneling). The peer group said the target two hour 40 min trip time will not be achieved.

In 2022, in order to improve legislative oversight, Governor Newsom and the California legislature agreed to appoint an inspector general to the California High-Speed Rail Authority, a position equipped with its own staffing and endowed with more extensive authorities such as full access to project records and contracts, as well as the ability to issue subpoenas for witnesses and records. However, the inspector general will not be able to directly control spending. In 2023, the governor appointed Benjamin Belnap to the position.

The California Legislative Analyst's Office has expressed concerns about the California High-Speed Rail Authority's reliance on cap-and-trade revenues as a primary funding source. In a 2023 report, the LAO highlighted that while the cap-and-trade program is authorized through 2030, the future of the program beyond that date remains uncertain. The LAO recommended that the Legislature consider more stable funding sources to ensure the project's continuation. Additionally, In 2023 the LAO provided an additional report on cap-and-trade revenues, which highlighted the volatile nature of the Cap and Trade Programs Greenhouse Gas Reduction Fund. The report noted that the Cap and Trade Program is heavily dependent on market health, highlighting that the program generated significantly less revenue in 2020. The LAO emphasized that such revenue volatility could cause funding shortages for state projects relying on Cap and Trade funds.

In 2026, the legislature extended cap-and-trade funding for CAHSR from 2030 to 2045 and made funding a fixed $1 billion dollars annually rather than a percentage of revenue, which avoids revenue volatility.

=== Public opinion polls ===
Public approval of the project among California residents has remained relatively steady since 2008, when Prop 1A passed with 53 percent of the vote. In April 2022, UC Berkeley's Institute of Government Studies released a survey of registered voters that found 56 percent supporting continuation of the high-speed rail project, even if "its operations only extend from Bakersfield to Merced in the Central Valley by the year 2030 and to the Bay Area by the year 2033", and 35 percent remaining opposed. Approval varied by political affiliation, with 73 percent of Democrats backing the project versus 25% of Republicans.

A poll commissioned by Newsweek in June 2024 confronted eligible voters across the US with the missed 2020 deadline for completion of Phase 1 stipulated in Prop 1A, as well as with the increase of its initial cost estimate of $33 billion to $128 billion. Nonetheless, 40 percent of respondents deemed the project worthwhile that 33 percent who deemed it not worthwhile, with the other 27 percent being undecided.

A poll commissioned by KTLA parent company Nexstar and conducted by Emerson College Polling was published in February 2025, which found that among a sample of 1,000 Californians, 56 percent of respondents deemed the high-speed rail project a good use of state funds. The margin of error of the poll was given at three percentage points.

An older statewide survey, conducted in March 2016 by the Public Policy Institute of California (PPIC), indicated that 52 percent of Californians supported the project, while 63 percent of Californians thought the project is either "very important" or "somewhat important" for California's economy and quality of life. Support varied by location, with the San Francisco Bay Area the highest at 63 percent, and the lowest in the Orange/San Diego region at 47 percent. It also varied by race, with 66 percent of Asians, 58 percent of Latin Americans, 44 percent of Whites, and 42 percent of African Americans supporting the project. The survey also concluded that mostly younger Californians supported the project, with a lower support rate as the age increased. Politically, mostly Democrats supported the project with a support rate of 59 percent, compared to 29 percent of Republicans and 47 percent of Independent Californians.

== Economic, environmental and community debates ==
=== Construction sequencing ===
Concerns have been raised with the plan to start service on only the IOS in the Central Valley. As The Guardian wrote in 2022, because the IOS would not reach the major urban centers of the Bay Area and Los Angeles, initial ridership potential could be severely limited. While previous iterations of the IOS would have connected to at least one of these metro areas, they were scaled back due to lack of funding. While Gavin Newsom has supported completing the line from Merced to Bakersfield, other California lawmakers such as Anthony Rendon have argued that the limited funds should be directed to other segments of the line, such as Burbank to Anaheim, which run through more densely populated areas and could see higher initial ridership even without the rest of the system being complete. Rendon described the approach as "not the end of high-speed rail, but a way to save it." The Authority countered that the Central Valley was the easiest location to start due to the flat terrain, and was the most suitable location for a test track once the first trainsets are delivered. In addition, federal funding granted in 2010–11 was required to be used in the Central Valley segment.

A 2024 opinion piece published in the Times of San Diego compared the California project to high-speed rail in Indonesia, which opened its initial section in 2023. The Indonesian rail project only reaches the outskirts of the cities it serves, requiring a long trip on local transit to reach the city centers. Similarly, the California IOS would require a transfer on both ends to reach the Bay Area and Los Angeles. High-speed rail in Indonesia was reporting an operational loss and lower ridership than forecast. However, the Lowy Institute notes that the Indonesian corridor is short (less than half of the California IOS) and already served by frequent rail service while its tickets are twice as expensive, limiting the line's attractiveness to passengers. The Los Angeles Times wrote: "fares will be one of the most important factors in the decisions that millions of travelers will make when choosing to fly, drive or ride the bullet train."

=== Transport mode and ridership ===
The sections from San Francisco to Gilroy and from Burbank to Anaheim are intended to be operated as "blended" sections, in which high-speed trains would share the rail corridor and tracks with slower commuter rail and possibly freight trains, in order to avoid a costly dedicated right-of-way in dense urban areas. This has been the subject of criticism, as it would limit both train speeds and frequencies on the shared corridors. A 2015 report prepared by Eric Eidlin of the U.S Department of Transportation noted that while these were downsides of blended operation (as is the case for high-speed rail in Germany), there were also potential benefits, such as improved transit connectivity from sharing existing stations, and reduced noise and environmental impacts.

Some Bay Area residents have questioned the safety of allowing high-speed trains to use grade crossings, and pushed for more grade separations along the route. City governments such as Palo Alto have expressed concern that future rail operations would cause traffic congestion at grade crossings, due to the high frequency of combined high-speed rail and Caltrain service.

Because most California cities have less public transit coverage compared to cities abroad served by high-speed rail, some critics have expressed concern that a lack of local transit connectivity may discourage potential riders. Assemblywoman Laura Friedman asked: "How (do) we turn California car culture into a California culture of transit of all sorts? ... That is the big question — and how does high-speed rail interact with that?" The urban policy think tank SPUR highlighted that to improve the usability of high-speed rail, cities should focus future development and density around stations, integrate them into surrounding communities and public spaces, prevent displacement through gentrification, and provide robust alternatives for station access besides driving. Large investments in public transit are currently underway or planned in the state's major cities, with the Bay Area expanding BART, commuter rail, light rail and bus rapid transit, while Los Angeles is spending $120 billion through Measure M to build out its Metro Rail and bus network.

In a 2013 analysis, the libertarian Reason Foundation argued that California's ridership projections could be overly optimistic. They noted that California expected 73 percent of its total ridership to be captured from existing highway travel, while in Europe, high-speed rail ridership was mostly captured from airlines and conventional rail, with only 11–16 percent from highways. High-speed rail tends to capture significantly more riders from airlines and conventional rail than from highways, due to the comparable nature of the trips requiring travel to a station or airport.

In 2023, about 4.8 million passengers flew between the Bay Area and greater Los Angeles, (Note: Data from the Bureau of Transportation Statistics for passenger trips between LAX, BUR, ONT, SNA and LGA airports in Southern California, and SFO, OAK and SJC airports in the Bay Area.) while total 2022 Amtrak ridership in the state was about 6.4 million. In comparison, the Authority projected 28.4 million high-speed rail riders on Phase 1 by 2040. The Reason Foundation did not account for induced demand, or new trips generated by high-speed rail rather than those replacing existing car, airline and transit trips. A study by the Transportation Research Board found that among high-speed rail projects worldwide, induced demand accounted for anywhere from 0 to 80 percent of total ridership, which represents a major uncertainty in ridership projections.

In the early 2000s, forecasters expected California's population to hit 59 million by 2040, but updated forecasts in 2023 expect it to remain around 40 million, only a slight increase from the population at that time. With the rate of population growth slowing, particularly after the COVID-19 pandemic, some critics have questioned the need for additional transportation capacity in the state. In 2023, the Times-Standard wrote, "...It's time for local and state government officials to recalibrate. Projects that were conceived based on the assumption of an expanding California population will no longer make sense." The Authority has revised its Phase 1 ridership projections downward, from 38.6 million in 2020 to 31.5 million in 2023. The major exception to California population trends is in the Central Valley, which is expected to add up to 5 million new residents by 2060. This could significantly increase transportation demand in the state's interior, even with a lack of growth in coastal cities.

==== Hyperloop ====
In 2013, Elon Musk proposed the Hyperloop as an alternative to the California High-Speed Rail, claiming that its system of passenger pods traveling through low-pressure tubes would be faster and cheaper to construct. Musk's Hyperloop proposal attracted international media attention, including coverage by the The New York Times and Los Angeles Times that highlighted his technological ambitions. The proposal also drew criticism over its technical feasibility, safety, and estimated construction costs. Hyperloop One, the only company to have built a working prototype, shut down in 2023 after failing to find a buyer for the technology.

=== Choice of route ===
The approximate location of alternative routes (blue) considered for California High-Speed Rail, as compared to the currently planned system (black). Brightline West is indicated in orange.

A route between the Bay Area and the Central Valley via Altamont Pass – which was among the corridor options listed in Proposition 1A – has been suggested as an alternative to the Pacheco Pass route. Critics such as the California Rail Foundation and Samer Madanat, director of the Institute of Transportation Studies at UC Berkeley, have noted that Altamont would provide a more direct link from the Stockton and Modesto areas to San Francisco, compared to Pacheco which requires a long detour to the south.

As of 2020, the Sierra Club also opposed the Pacheco route in favor of Altamont, citing the greater impacts of the former on Coast Range wildlife and its potential to induce urban sprawl in the countryside surrounding Gilroy. Sprawl has been a general concern since the early planning of the project; a station in Los Banos – which the Pacheco route passes between Gilroy and Merced – was specifically prohibited by Prop 1A as a compromise for the Sierra Club and other environmental groups to endorse the ballot.

The Authority has intended to build the Pacheco route since 2007, and as of 2024 its plans remained unchanged. Because of its more northerly location, the alternative Altamont route would bypass downtown San Jose and require either a tunnel under San Francisco Bay or the reconstruction of the Dumbarton Rail Bridge. The Altamont route would also pass through more heavily urbanized areas than the Pacheco route, potentially leading to more opposition from property owners. Planned upgrades to other existing Northern California rail lines are expected to improve service and increase speeds through Altamont Pass, as well as from Sacramento to the Bay Area. (Note: As of 2019, planned upgrades to the existing ACE commuter rail route across Altamont Pass would provide a fast and frequent connection from Stockton, Modesto and Merced to the South Bay, while the Dumbarton Rail Corridor project plans to restore service (for non-high-speed commuter trains) on the Dumbarton crossing. The existing Capitol Corridor service between Sacramento, Oakland and San Jose is also planned to be improved with more frequent service and speeds up to 150 miles per hour (240 km/h).)

Routing high-speed rail along I-5, which would have provided a shorter trip between the Bay Area and Southern California but bypassed Fresno and Bakersfield, (Note: The I-5 route would have included lower speed branch lines to connect the Central Valley cities to the main line.) was also discussed in the 2000s. SNCF, the French national high-speed rail operator, proposed an I-5 alignment to the Authority and offered to build it with the help of foreign investment, although in 2009 they also expressed their interest in building the state's official proposed alignment. The Authority turned down SNCF's involvement in 2011, in part due to "Buy America" requirements that mandate transportation projects using federal funds to use domestically produced trains and materials, and due to political considerations as Proposition 1A outlined a route through Fresno and Bakersfield.

A route from the Central Valley to Southern California through Tejon Pass (the Grapevine along I-5), which would be shorter than the route through Tehachapi Pass and Palmdale, was initially disconsidered because initial studies expected Tejon would require more tunneling. A 2022 investigation by The New York Times reported that a 1999 engineering study favored the more direct route through Tejon Pass. The study estimated that going through Palmdale would add 41 miles and increase costs by 16 percent. Los Angeles County Supervisor Mike Antonovich supported the Palmdale route, and said that it could attract more passengers by serving the growing desert communities of Lancaster and Palmdale. The investigation also reported that Authority chairman Tom Richards defended the route, saying that a follow-up study had confirmed that the Tejon route faced higher land-acquisition costs and opposition from landowners.

In 2012, the Authority reopened a study of the Tejon route after it was found that the Palmdale route would need more tunneling than anticipated. The study was canceled after the city of Palmdale threatened to sue, citing that Prop 1A specifies a route through there. The owners of Tejon Ranch, which has large land holdings in Tejon Pass, also opposed the Tejon route and pressured the Authority to drop the study. Although the Tejon route would provide a faster north-south trip, it would miss the opportunity to connect with Brightline West in Palmdale.

In a 2025 project update report to state legislators, the Authority laid out the option of re-sequencing the project such that Merced, which so far had been prioritized as the northern terminus of the initial operating segment (IOS), would be de-prioritized in favor of diverting its limited funding to a faster build-out towards Gilroy, thus connecting to the Bay Area population center. Any such change to the existing prioritization of the IOS would require legislative approval. Within the full Phase 1 system, Merced does not directly lie on the mainline that would connect San Francisco with Los Angeles, but instead is the end node of a shorter segment branching off the former. Projected over 40 years, the Bay Area connection via Gilroy would result in a $47.5 billion operating profit, compared to a $3.8 billion loss on just a Merced-to-Bakersfield segment.

=== Construction impact on communities ===
Construction work in the Central Valley has caused disruptions, such as noise and air quality impacts to residents along the route, and road closures at overpass construction sites. The city of Wasco raised concerns about neglect of properties purchased by the Authority along the rail alignment, which had become blighted and attracted squatters for several years. In November 2021 the city reached a resolution with the Authority to clean up the site. Properties were taken by eminent domain in Fresno, Bakersfield and smaller cities along the route. Assemblyman Vince Fong (R-Bakersfield) said that "the high-speed rail authority is trying to sugar coat the impacts it is having on communities. ... It impacts significantly part of Bakersfield that is socioeconomically disadvantaged."

The project has impacted agriculture along its route in the Central Valley, with portions of several large properties being cut off from access, disruption of irrigation systems, and a reduction in the acreage available for farming. While the state is legally required to compensate farmers for financial setbacks and the use of their land, some payments have been significantly delayed, sometimes by up to a year.
