= California High-Speed Rail Authority =

Agency of the California State Transportation Agency

Agency overview
- Formed: September 24, 1996; 30 years ago
- Jurisdiction: State of California
- Headquarters: 770 L Street, Suite 620, Sacramento, CA 95814
- Annual budget: Unknown
- Agency executives: Joe Stephenshaw, Interim CEO; Tom Richards, Chairperson
- Parent agency: California State Transportation Agency
- Website: www.hsr.ca.gov

The California High-Speed Rail Authority (CHSRA) is a California state agency established in 1996 pursuant to the California High-Speed Rail Act to develop and implement high-speed intercity rail service, namely the California High-Speed Rail project. The CHSRA succeeded the California Intercity High-Speed Rail Commission, which was created in 1993.

== CAHSR board members ==
The Authority is composed of 9 regular members plus 2 ex officio members. Five members are appointed by the Governor, two members are appointed by the Senate Committee on Rules, and two members are appointed by the Speaker of the Assembly. The two ex officio members are from each of the two legislative bodies.

The members appointed by the Governor have terms of office of 4 years. Per Katta Hules of the California High-Speed Rail Authority, members whose terms of office have technically expired serve until replaced. As of Jan. 2024 the Board was composed of:

Member	Appointment	Term ends (members serve until replaced)
Tom Richards, chairperson	Appointed by the Governor	December 31, 2021.
Nancy Miller, vice chairperson	Appointed by the Governor	December 31, 2023.
Ernesto M. Camacho	Appointed by the Senate Rules Committee	December 31, 2022.
Martha M. Escutia	Appointed by the Speaker of the Assembly	Term is at pleasure of the Speaker.
James C. Ghielmetti	Appointed by the Governor	December 31, 2020.
Emily Cohen	Appointed by the Speaker of the Assembly	Term is at pleasure of the Speaker.
Henry Perea	Appointed by the Senate Rules Committee	December 31, 2024.
Lynn Schenk	Appointed by the Governor	December 31, 2021.
Anthony Williams	Appointed by the Governor	December 31, 2022.
Joaquin Arambula, ex officio	Appointed by the Speaker of the Assembly	Term while in office is at pleasure of the Speaker of the Assembly.
Lena Gonzalez, ex officio	Chairman of the Senate Transportation Committee; Appointed by the Senate Committee on Rules	Term while in office is at pleasure of the Senate Committee on Rules.

== Committee structure ==
The 2024 Business Plan (Final draft) gives a synopsis of the committee structure of the Authority on pages 75–77. The committees are:

- Executive Committee (EC)
- Administrative Committee (AC, reports directly to EC)
- Development Review Committee
- Business Oversight Committee (BOC, reports directly to EC)
- Program Delivery Committee (PDC, reports directly to EC)
- Program Delivery Advisory Committee (PDAC, reports directly to PDC)
- Change Control Committee (CCC, reports directly to EC)
- Enterprise Risk Committee (ERC, reports directly to Finance & Audit Comm.)

In addition to these operational committees, the Board has a subset of its members who comprise the Finance and Audit Committee to monitor the finances of the project.

== Inspector general ==
The August 2023 CEO Report to the Authority Board noted that Governor Newsom had appointed Benjamin Belnap as Inspector General of the California High-Speed Rail Authority as per SB 198. Belnap has been an employee of the State Auditor's office since 2001, and a Deputy State Auditor since 2015. He will report to the board occasionally during his four-year term.

== Required reports to the Legislature ==
By law the Authority must provide a report to the Legislature every year. There are two types of reports.

The Authority's Business Plan describes the project's goals, financing, and development plans. This must be submitted every even year to the Legislature by May 1.

Every odd year The Authority is required to submit a Project Update Report. This gives a project-wide summary, as well as information for each project section, in order to clearly describe the project's status and projections for the future. This must be submitted to the Legislature by March 1.
