= City National Grove of Anaheim =

Music hall in Anaheim, California

DigAlert Grove of Anaheim
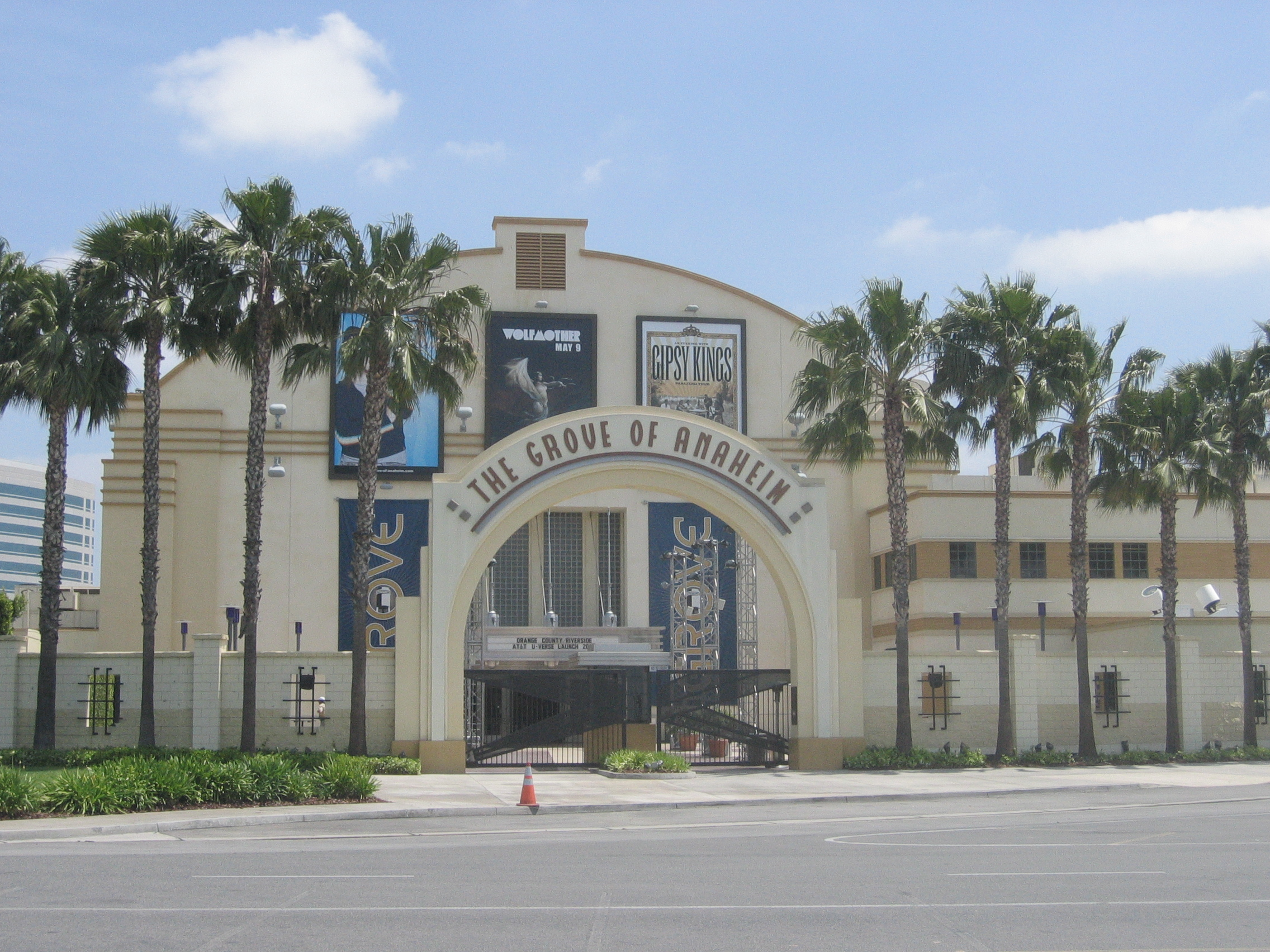
- Interactive map of DigAlert Grove of Anaheim
- Former names: Tinseltown, The Sun Theatre
- Address: 2200 East Katella Avenue
- Location: Anaheim, California, United States
- Coordinates: 33.803164°N 117.885681°W
- Owner: City of Anaheim
- Operator: OCVIBE
- Capacity: 1,700
- Public transit: Anaheim

Construction
- Opened: 1998

Website
- www.digalertgroveofanaheim.com

The DigAlert Grove of Anaheim is an indoor, live music venue in Anaheim, California, United States operated by OC Vibe. Its approximate capacity is 1,700.

Less than two miles (3.2 km) from the Disneyland Resort, the Grove is just to the east of Interstate 5 on Katella Avenue. The Grove sits on the northwest corner of the parking lot of Angel Stadium of Anaheim, home of Major League Baseball's Los Angeles Angels. It is also located near the Anaheim Regional Transportation Intermodal Center with Amtrak and Metrolink service.

Having opened in 1998, the venue was originally opened as the ill-fated Tinseltown, an awards show-themed restaurant. After converting to a concert venue, it was temporarily renamed The Sun Theatre before changing its name to The Grove of Anaheim. On January 24, 2011, the venue again changed its name to City National Grove of Anaheim, following the agreement of a five-year, $1.25 million naming rights deal with City National Bank. On August 4, 2026 the name changed to DigAlert Grove of Anaheim after an agreement with Southern California based non-profit DigAlert.

Among the artists that have performed here are Air Supply, Ana Barbara, Bob Dylan, B.B. King, Boz Scaggs, Chiquis, Enrique Bunbury, Everclear, George Lopez, Halford, Jeff Beck & Johnny Depp, Julio Iglesias, Joe Satriani, Jamie Foxx, Jaguares, Live, MattyBRaps, Machine Gun Kelly (musician), Marilyn Manson, Merle Haggard, Miranda Sings, Prince, Ray Davies, Seal, Something Corporate, The Fab Four, and Ween.
