= Anaheim Resort Transportation =

Defunct American transportation company

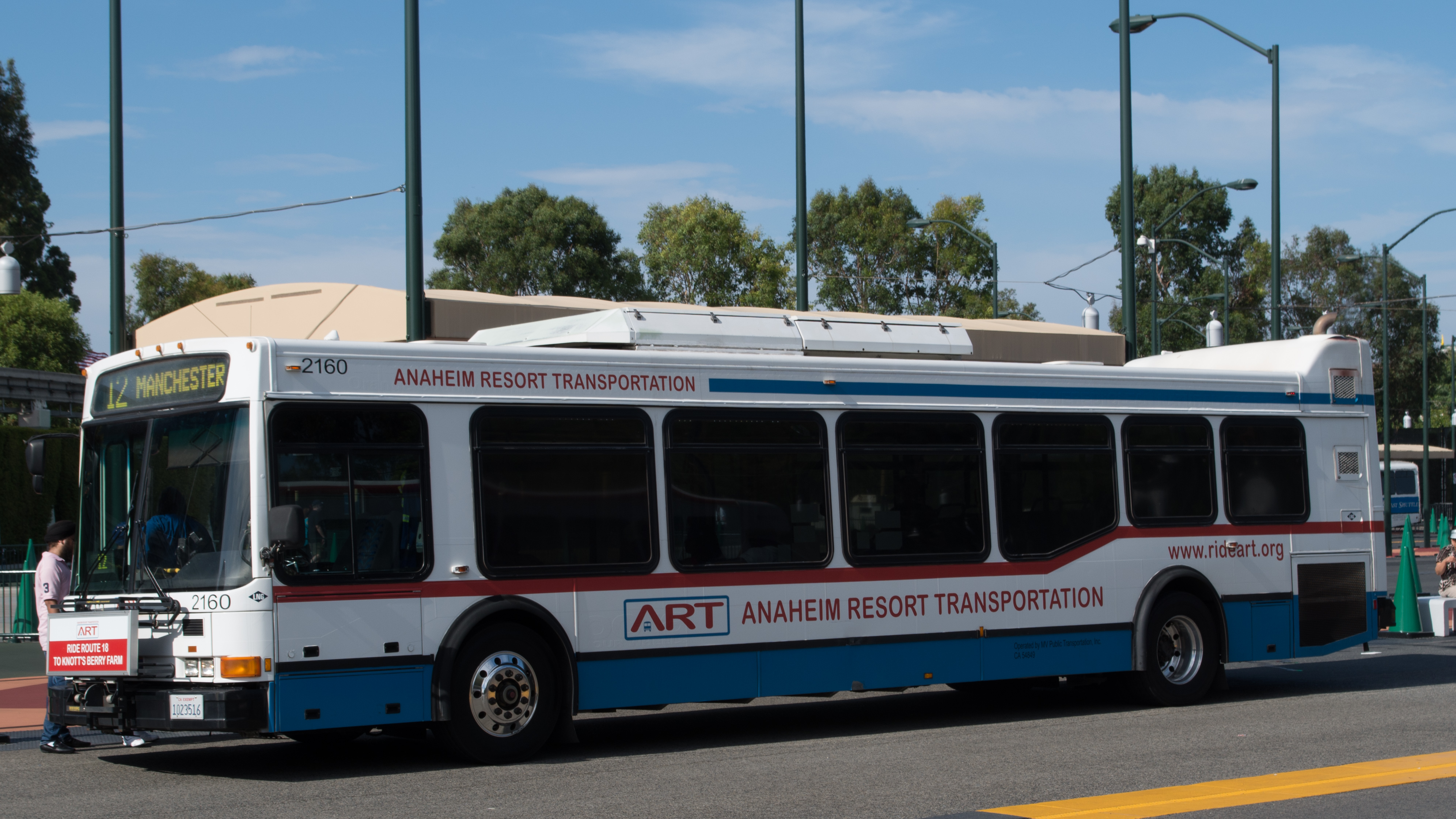
- Parent: Anaheim Transportation Network
- Founded: 1998
- Commenced operation: May 2002
- Ceased operation: March 31, 2026
- Defunct: 2026
- Headquarters: 1354 South Anaheim Blvd. Anaheim, California 92805
- Service area: Greater Anaheim Resort, Orange County, California, United States
- Service type: Bus
- Routes: 14
- Hubs: Disneyland Resort Main Transportation Center
- Fleet: 45
- Daily ridership: 107,900 (weekdays, Q1 2026)
- Annual ridership: 8,505,500 (2025)
- Fuel type: CNG, battery electric
- Operator: Transdev
- Chief executive: Diana Kotler
- Website: www.rideart.org

Anaheim Resort Transportation (ART), formerly Anaheim Resort Transit, was a mass transportation service in the Anaheim Resort area and its environs in Orange County, California, United States. ART used a fleet of vehicles, including tourist trolleys, to provide access to hotels, malls, and tourist-related enterprises, which were the main destinations connected by the system.

The ART service was provided by the Anaheim Transportation Network (ATN), a quasi-governmental transportation management association established as a nonprofit public–private partnership in 1998. Service began in May 2002 with 8 routes. In 2025, the system had a ridership of 8,505,500, or about 107,900 per weekday as of the first quarter of 2026. The service ended on March 31, 2026, after the agency announced rising costs and stagnating revenues.

== Governance ==
ART was owned by the Anaheim Transportation Network, a quasi-government agency organized as a nonprofit corporation. Its board of directors was composed of representatives from Disneyland, hotels, local government, tourist attractions, and other businesses in the Anaheim Resort and Platinum Triangle. Diana Kotler was the executive director of the organization.

== Cessation of operations ==
On January 28, 2026, the agency announced it would end service on March 31, 2026. The agency cited the inability of revenues from hotel fees to keep up with rising labor costs. The Anaheim city government previously sought to acquire the operations, but this was halted.

The Anaheim city government is interested in creating a municipally operated service as a successor to ATN. The Anaheim Tourism Improvement District committee is considering purchasing two properties at 1354 S. Anaheim Blvd. and 1213-1227 S. Claudina St. The agency has 74 vehicles that have to be transferred to another public agency, as federal law requires due to the buses being purchased with grant money. The Orange County Transportation Authority does not currently have an interest in purchasing ATN assets. The representing union Teamsters Local 1932 stated that 70 employees found new work through the contracting employer Parking Company of America.

Disneyland stated it will continue to have shuttle service from its Toy Story parking lot.

== Former service ==
At the time it ended service, ART operated 12 fixed route lines, however, routes may have been combined during periods of low demand. Most routes served to connect hotels in the Anaheim and Garden Grove area with the Disneyland Resort.

From 2010 until the end of service, Disney had contracted with ART to run route 20 between the Toy Story parking lot and the Disneyland Resort. This route operated fare-free.

Route	Terminals		Via
3 Grove	Anaheim; Disneyland Resort	Garden Grove; Great Wolf Lodge	Harbor Bl
4 Harbor Blvd.	Anaheim; Disneyland Resort	Garden Grove; Embassy Suites South / Hilton Garden Inn / Hampton Inn	Harbor Bl
5 Grand Plaza	Anaheim; Disneyland Resort	Anaheim; Harbor Bl & Convention Way	Harbor Bl, Convention Center
6 Disney Way	Anaheim; Disneyland Resort		Courtyard, Manchester Duo, Cambria Resort, JW Marriott, Wyndham
7 Clementine	Anaheim; Disneyland Resort		Hyatt House, Clementine Hotel, WorldMark, Element, SunCoast, Howard Johnson
8 Hotel Circle	Anaheim; Disneyland Resort		The Viv, Peacock Suites, Candlewood Suites, Hampton Inn, La Quinta, WorldMark
9 Katella Ave.	Anaheim; Disneyland Resort		Ball Rd, Best Western Pavilions, Best Western Stovall's Inn, Westin
11 Ball Rd.	Anaheim; Disneyland Resort		Desert Palms Hotel, Convention Center, Springhill Suites, Staybridge Suites, Team Disney Anaheim, Four Points
12 Manchester Ave.	Anaheim; Disneyland Resort	Anaheim; Doubletree Wy & City Bl	Manchester Av
15 ARTIC Sports Complex	Anaheim; Disneyland Resort	Anaheim; Frontera St & Glassell St	Katella Av, TownePlace Suites, Ayres, ARTIC, Orangeland RV Park, SR 57, Embassy Suites North
17 Canyon Metrolink	Anaheim; Disneyland Resort	Anaheim; Anaheim Canyon station	La Palma Av
20 Toy Story	Anaheim; Disneyland Resort	Anaheim; Disneyland Toy Story Parking	Disney Wy

== Former fleet and facilities ==
Make/Model	Fleet numbers	Thumbnail	Year	Type
ENC E-Z Rider II	1219–1221		2013	CNG
BYD K7M	3001–3012		2020	Battery-electric
BYD K9M	4001–4020		2021	Battery-electric
BYD K11M	6001–6020		2021	Battery-electric

ATN supported operations, maintenance, and administration at its Base Facility, 1354 South Anaheim Blvd. There was an adjacent Parking Facility to support overflow bus parking at 1280 South Anaheim Blvd. 10 revenue vehicles could be parked at the Base Facility, which included 3 maintenance bays and 2 lifts. The Parking Facility could accommodate 80 revenue vehicles.

== See also ==
- Disney Transport, mass transit provider for Walt Disney World
