= Platinum Triangle, Anaheim =

Platinum Triangle
- District
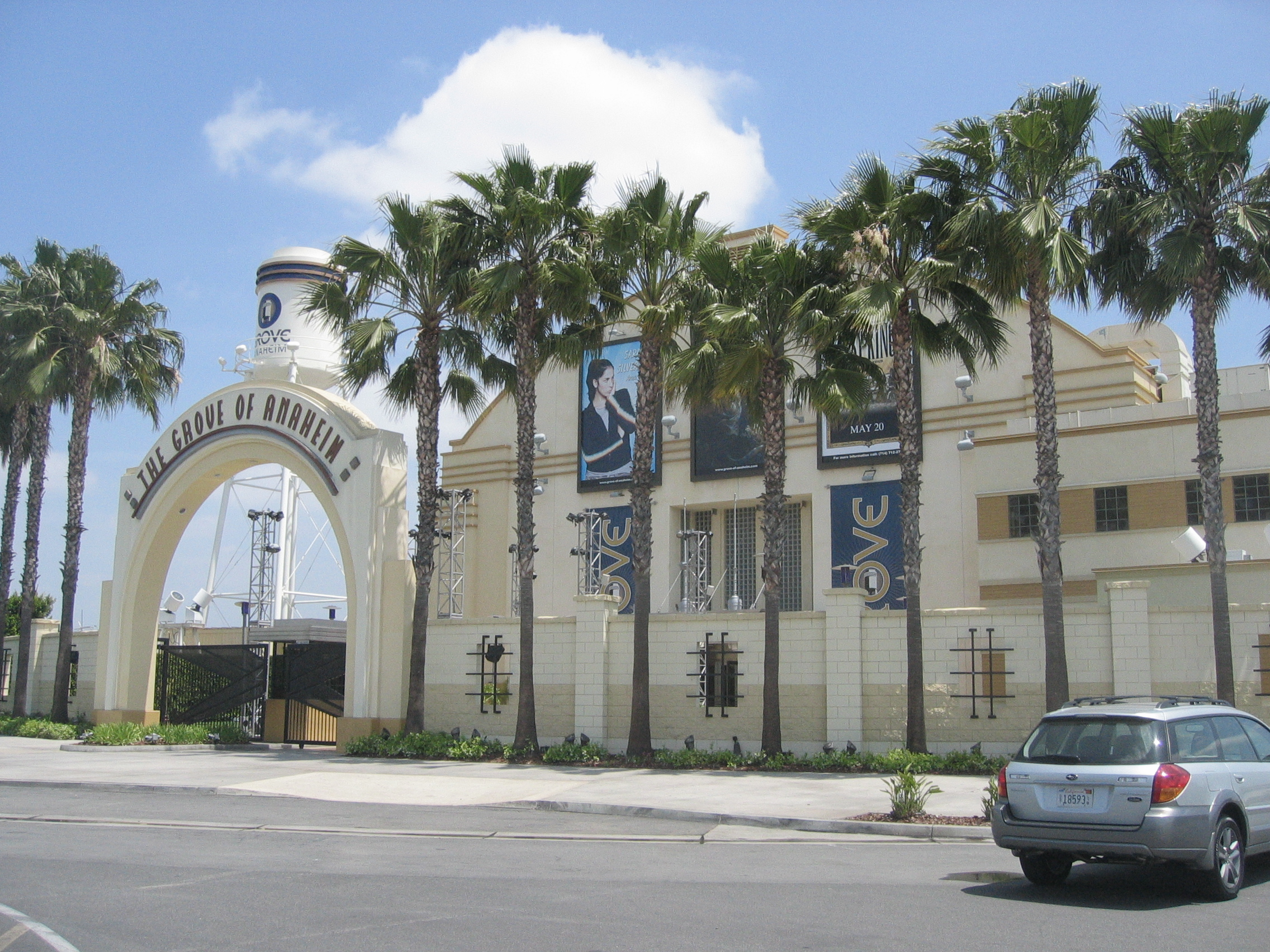
- The Grove of Anaheim

- Location within Anaheim and Northern Orange County Location within Greater Los Angeles Location within California33Location within the United States Platinum Triangle (the United States)
- Coordinates: 33.803507°N 117.889266°W
- Country: United States
- State: California
- County: Orange
- City: Anaheim

The Platinum Triangle is a district of Anaheim, California, United States, that is undergoing transformation from a low-density commercial and industrial zone into a more urban environment with high-density housing, commercial office towers, and retail space. The 820 acres (330 ha) area undergoing this large-scale redevelopment includes the city's two major sports venues, the Honda Center and Angel Stadium of Anaheim.

== Geography ==
The district's boundaries are roughly defined by Interstate 5, the Santa Ana River, and Cerritos Avenue. A small section to the south is part of the city of Orange, and thus is not considered part of the Platinum Triangle. The primary arterial roads through the area are State College Boulevard and Katella Avenue.

The district is located east of the Anaheim Resort, a major tourist destination which encompasses the Disneyland Resort, the Anaheim Convention Center, and several dozen hotels. It is also just north of The Block at Orange, a large outdoor shopping center, and UCI Medical Center. The Triangle also contains Angel Stadium of Anaheim and The Grove of Anaheim, a popular entertainment venue adjacent to the stadium. Honda Center, on the other side of State Route 57, is also within the Platinum Triangle.

== Developments ==
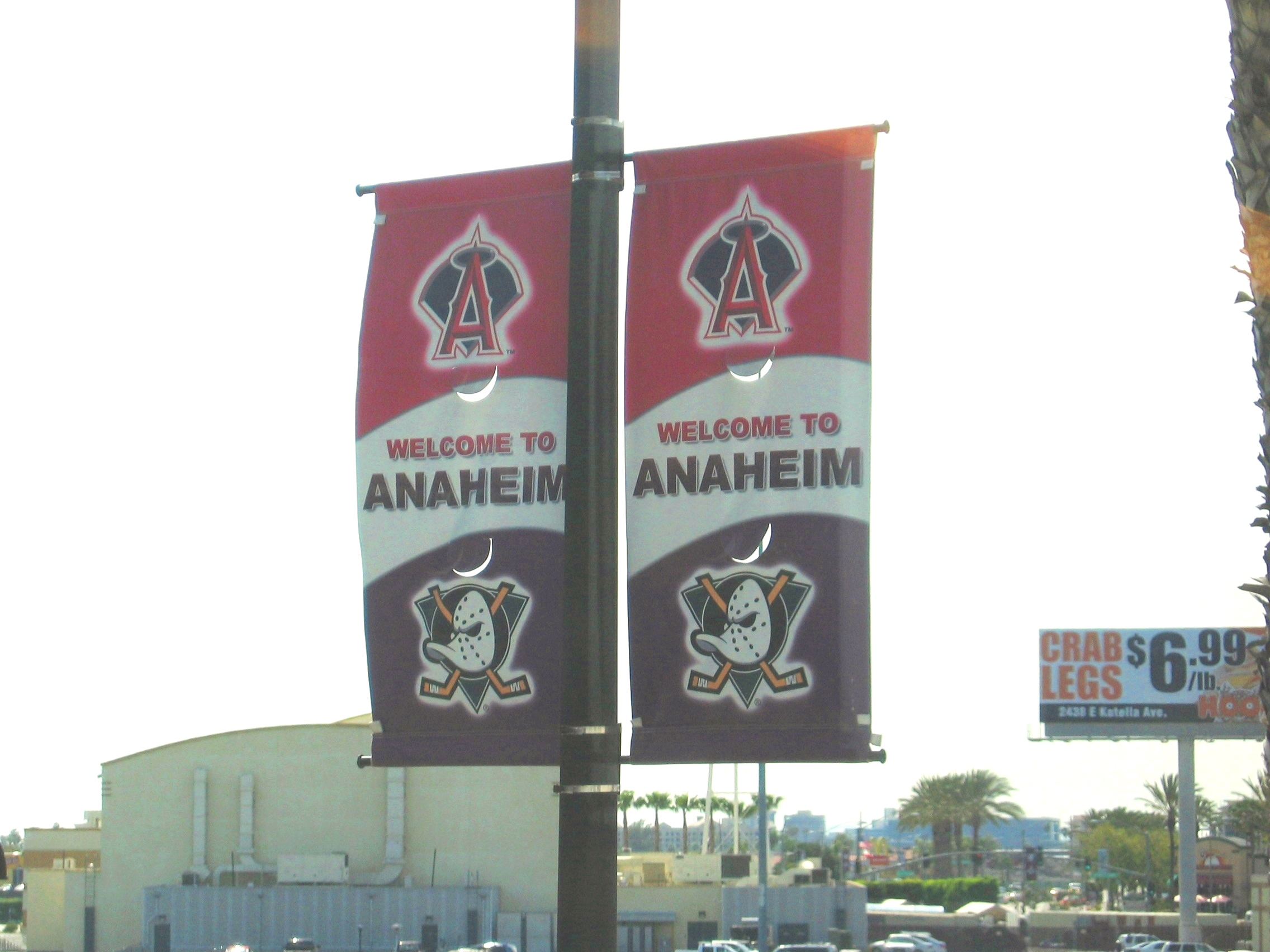
Promotional banners for the Angels and Ducks

When redevelopment is completed, the district is expected to offer mixed-use urban living with easy access to dining, shopping, and entertainment. It is envisioned as a downtown district for Orange County, competing with the South Coast Metro area, Irvine Business Complex, and downtown Santa Ana. The current tenants of the area, mainly industrial buildings, are gradually relocating to make way for mid-rise apartments, retail space, and several high-rise commercial buildings.

In 2008, Anaheim city planners announced an expansion of the initial Platinum Triangle proposal, doubling the amount of housing units and commercial office space from the original plans. Sixteen projects were either planned or currently under construction for a total of 18,363 homes, 5,700,000 square feet (530,000 m^{2}) of commercial space and 16,800,000 square feet (1,560,000 m^{2}) of office space.

As of August 2009, three projects had been completed: the Stadium Lofts, 1818 Platinum Triangle, and Gateway apartment homes. Additionally, construction has begun on several new roads west of Angel Stadium, including Market Street, the central promenade for the district.

In 2020, Henry Samueli's Anaheim Arena Management, which operates Honda Center, announced the plans for OC Vibe, an L.A. Live-inspired complex of apartments, offices and entertainment venues surrounding the arena to be built at the cost of $3 billion, with its first buildings to open in 2024. Earlier that month, the Los Angeles Angels also disclosed a scheme to surround Anaheim Stadium with similar buildings. Both projects would lead to over 268 acres (108 ha) built in the Platinum Triangle.

== Transportation ==
City planners envision the triangle as a transit-oriented environment, encompassing the Anaheim Regional Transportation Intermodal Center, or ARTIC, which replaced the Anaheim Amtrak Station located in the Angel Stadium parking lot. ARTIC continues to serve Amtrak's Pacific Surfliner and Metrolink trains, and will also be a terminus for the planned California High-Speed Rail system.

ARTIC could be a main transfer point to Orange County Transportation Authority bus routes. Planners hope that the robust transportation infrastructure will prevent a severe increase in traffic congestion from the large number of new residents and commuters.
