= Honda Center =

Multi-purpose indoor arena in Anaheim, California

- The Pond

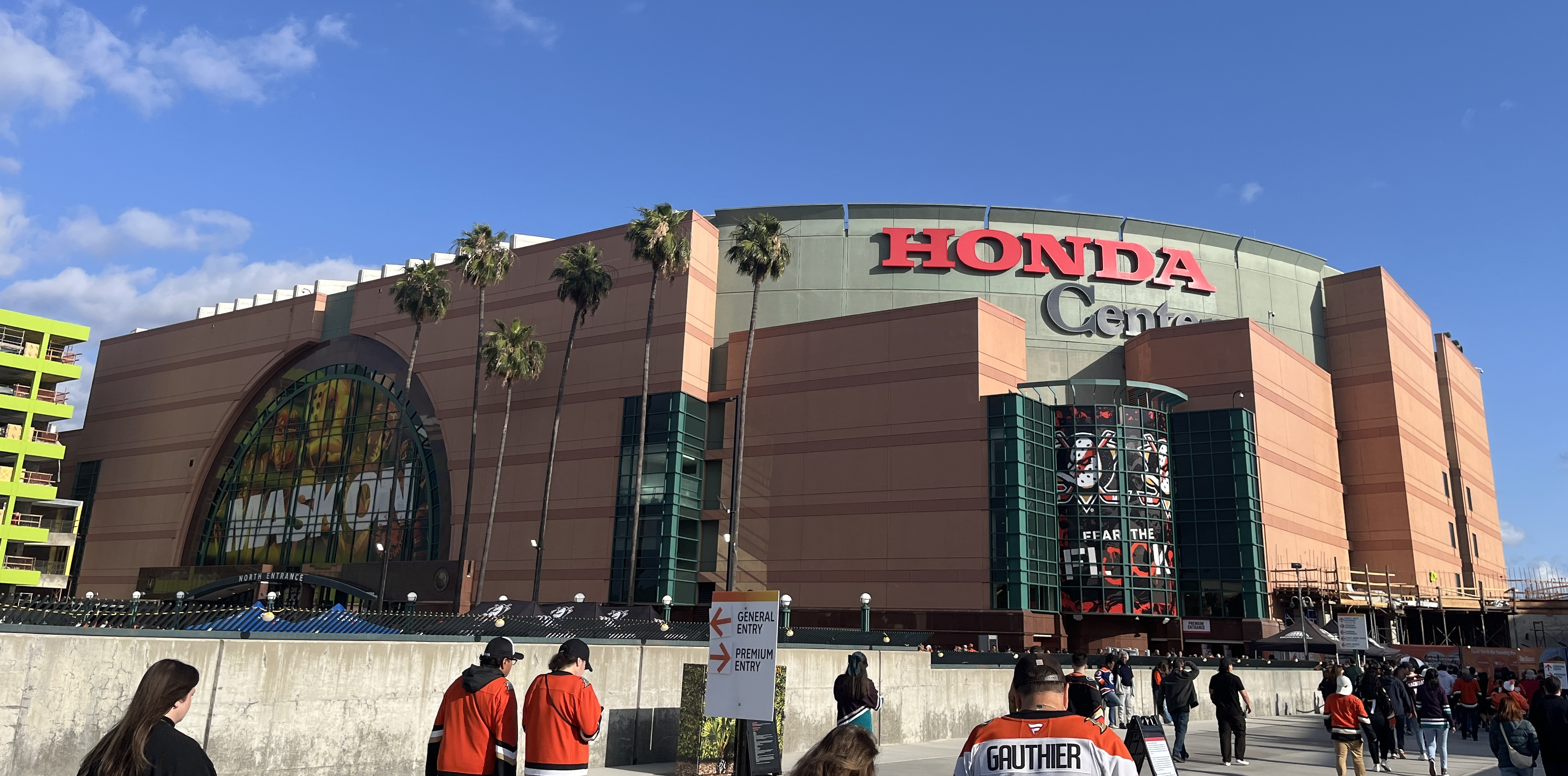
- Honda Center in 2026

- Location in the Greater Los Angeles area Location in California Location in the United States Location in North America
- Interactive map of Honda Center
- Former names: Anaheim Arena (planning/construction); Pond of Anaheim (1993); Arrowhead Pond of Anaheim (1993–2006)
- Address: 2695 East Katella Avenue
- Location: Anaheim, California, U.S.
- Coordinates: 33°48′28″N 117°52′36″W
- Owner: City of Anaheim
- Operator: Anaheim Arena Management
- Capacity: Basketball: 18,336; Concerts: 13,793–18,900; Ice hockey: 17,174; Theater: 10,935
- Field size: 650,000 square feet (60,000 m^{2})
- Public transit: Anaheim; OC Bus: 50, 53, Rapid 553 at Anaheim

Construction
- Groundbreaking: November 8, 1990; 36 years ago
- Opened: June 17, 1993; 33 years ago
- Cost: US$123 million ($303 million in 2025 dollars)
- Architect: HOK Sport (now Populous)
- Project manager: Turner Construction
- Structural engineer: Thornton Tomasetti
- Services engineer: Syska Hennessy Group, Inc.
- General contractor: Huber, Hunt & Nichols

Tenants
- Anaheim Ducks (NHL) (1993–present); Los Angeles Clippers (NBA) (1994–1999) (Note: Part-time.); Anaheim Bullfrogs (RHI/MLRH) (1994–1999); Anaheim Splash (CISL) (1994–1997); Anaheim Piranhas (AFL) (1996–1997); Anaheim Storm (NLL) (2004–2005); UCLA Bruins men's basketball (NCAA) (2011–2012); Los Angeles Kiss (AFL) (2014–2016)

Website
- hondacenter.com

Honda Center (formerly known as the Arrowhead Pond of Anaheim) is a multi-purpose indoor arena in Anaheim, California. The arena is home to the Anaheim Ducks of the National Hockey League. For ice hockey games, the arena is referred to as "The Pond at Honda Center."

Originally named the Anaheim Arena during construction, it opened on June 17, 1993 at a cost of US$123 million. Locally based Arrowhead Water paid $15 million for the naming rights over 10 years in October 1993. In the short period of time after the Mighty Ducks franchise was awarded and before the naming rights deal with Arrowhead, Disney referred to the Arena as the Pond of Anaheim. In October 2006, Honda, whose American headquarters are based in Torrance, paid $60 million for the naming rights over 15 years, and renewed the deal for another decade in 2020.

== History ==
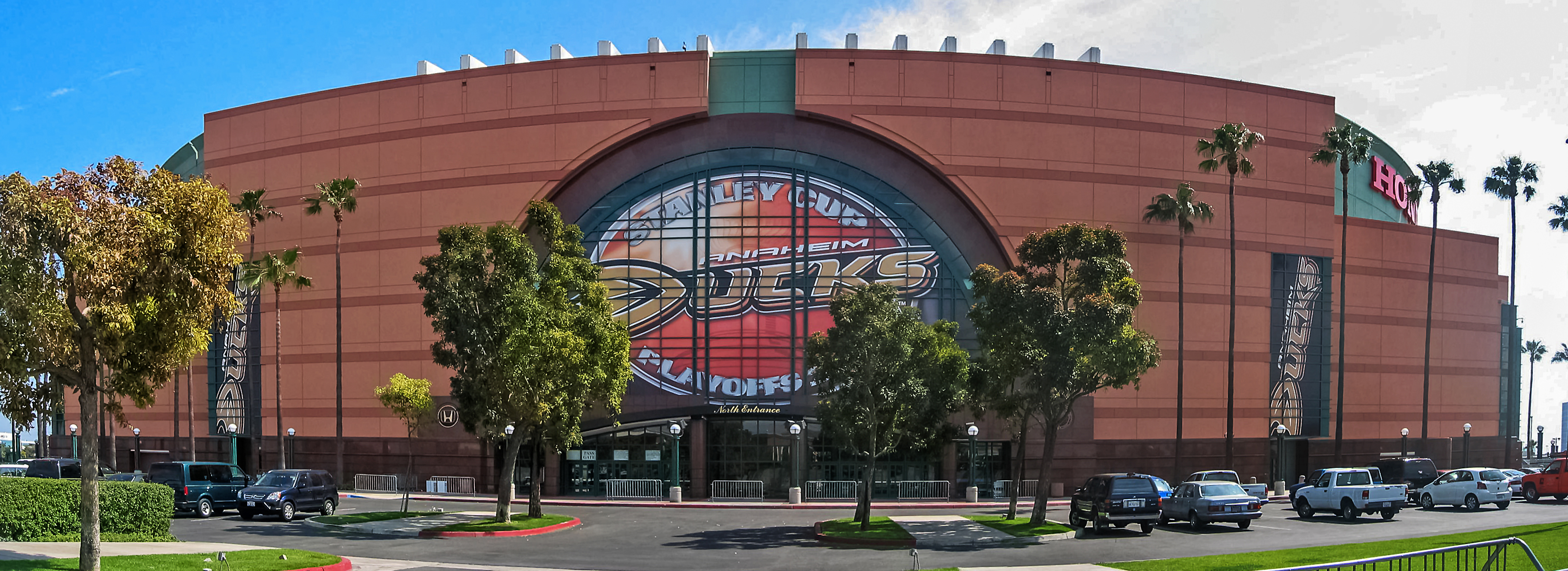
A panorama of Honda Center's exterior

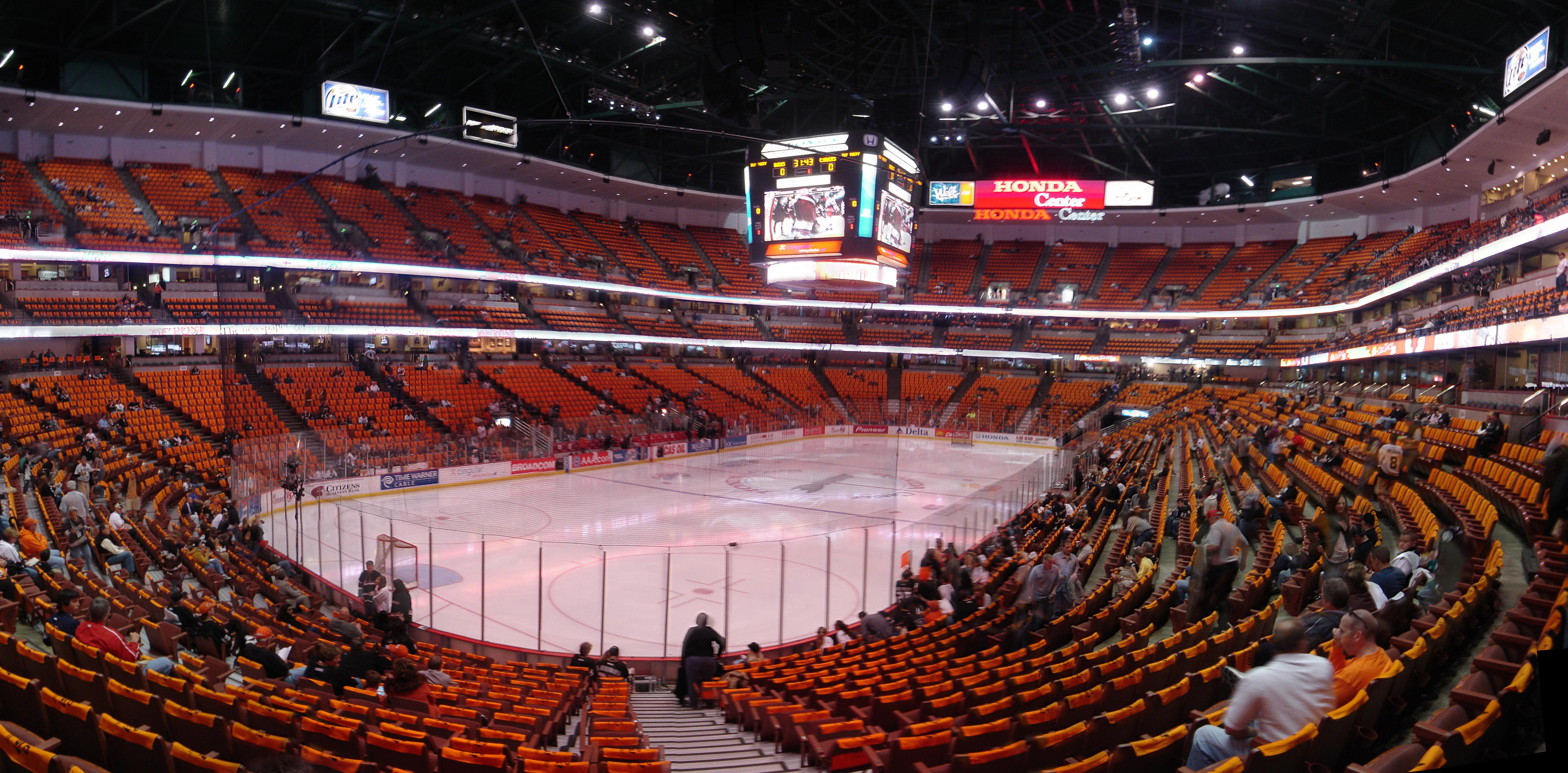
Panorama of Honda Center's interior before a 2007 playoff hockey game

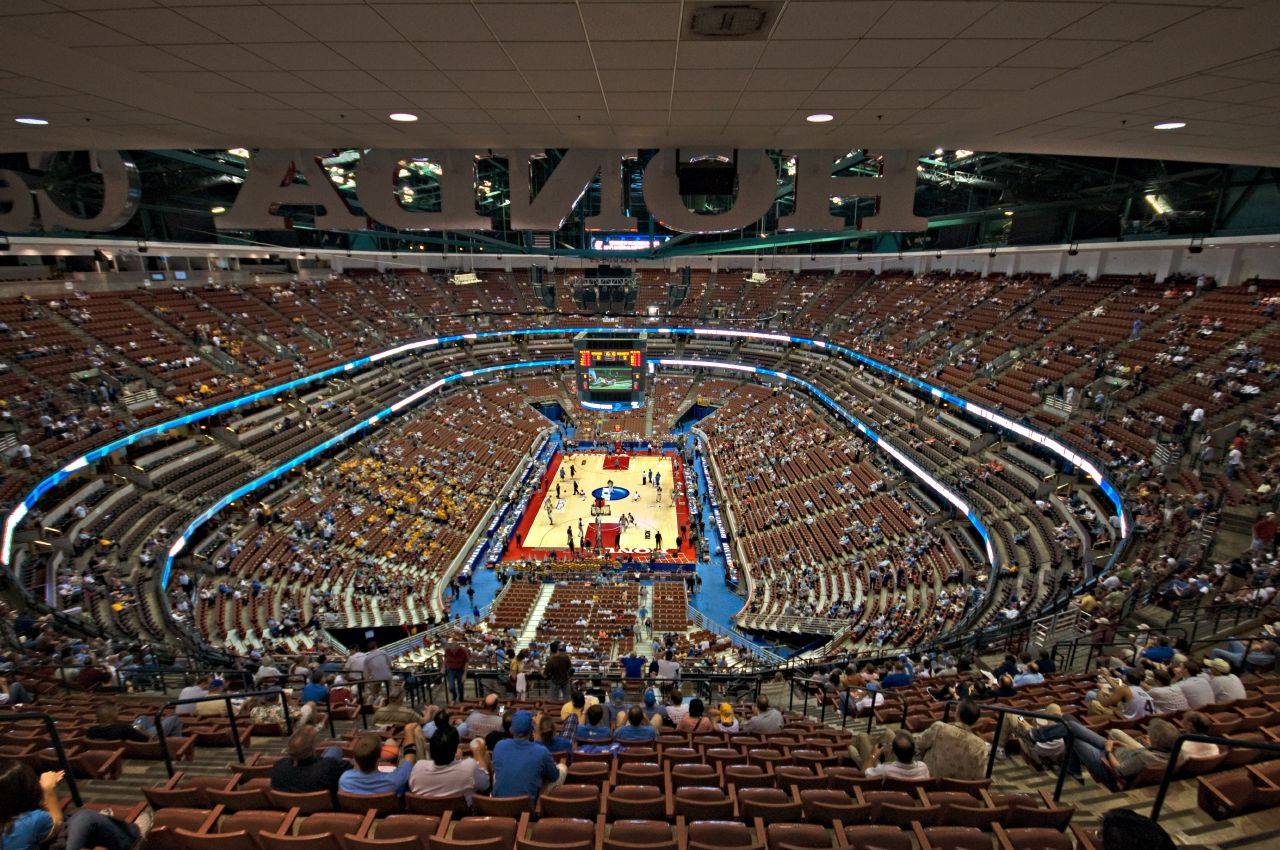
Honda Center in its basketball configuration before an NCAA basketball game

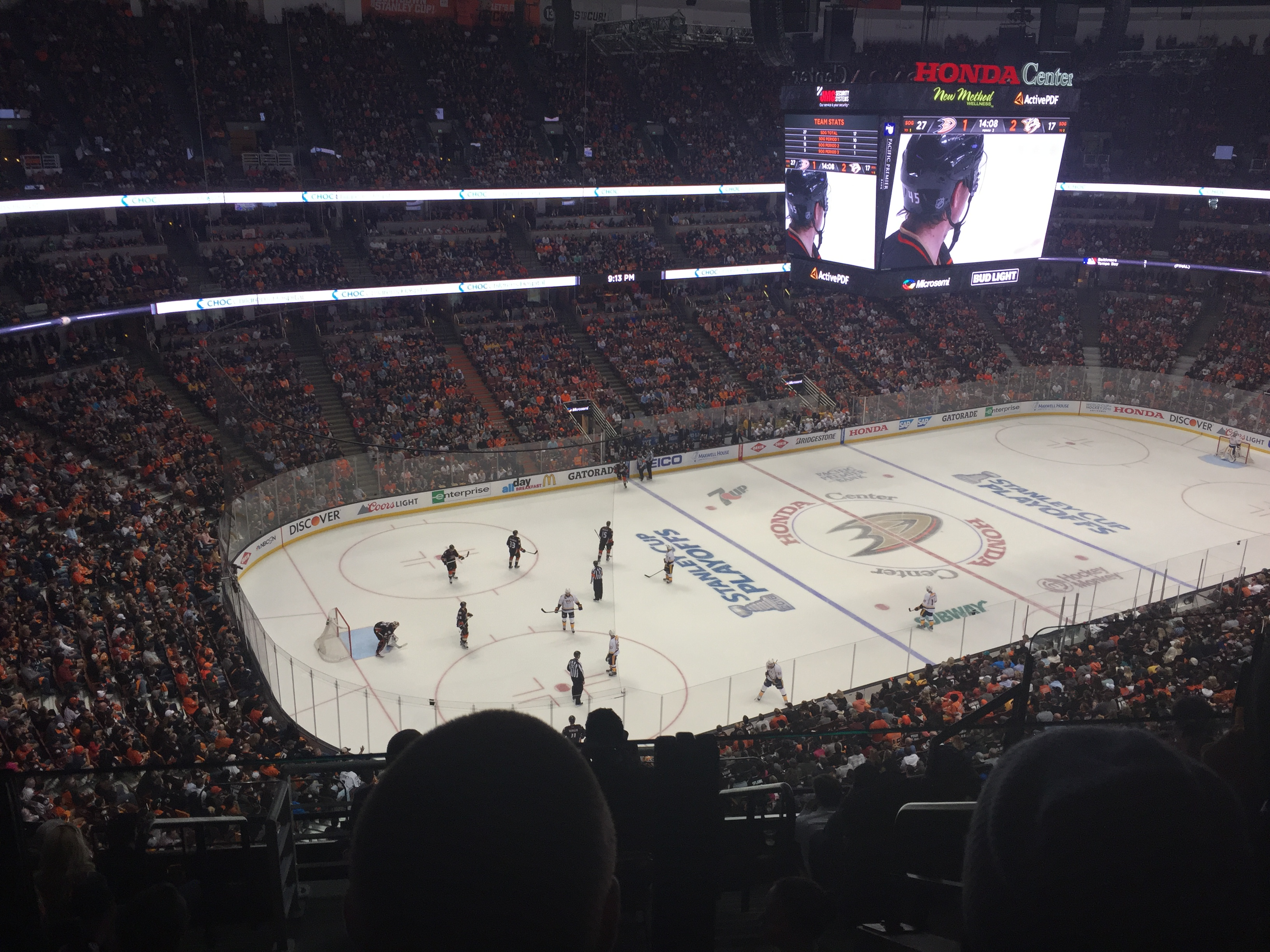
The New Scoreboard at Honda Center as seen from Section 438 during the 2016 Stanley Cup Play-offs on April 27, 2016

The idea for a large indoor arena in Anaheim emerged from entertainment attorney Neil Papiano, who in 1987 randomly selected two of the city's councilmen from the telephone directory to sell them his idea. They approved of the concept, and one year later following location surveys, the placement was chosen at a seven-acre parcel at Douglass Road and Katella Avenue, that at the time was owned by the German social group Phoenix Club. Papiano also managed to get financial backing from two New York-based firms, Ogden Corporation and Nederlander Organization. Even if there was a dispute to build an arena in Orange County with a Santa Ana project led by Spectacor, and there were discussions of feasibility of the arena given the National Basketball Association and National Hockey League were at the time unwilling to expand to the area, the city of Anaheim pushed forward to build the Hellmuth, Obata & Kassabaum, Inc.-designed arena, which broke ground in November 1990. A tenant was found in 1992, as the Walt Disney Company had just been awarded an NHL franchise for Anaheim, entering negotiations to lease the arena. Once the deal was broken, the arena's final cost ended at $121 million, as $18 million were added to finance hockey franchise fees and facility improvement.

The arena opened on June 19, 1993, with a Barry Manilow concert as its first event. The then-Arrowhead Pond's first NHL game was also the Mighty Ducks of Anaheim season opener on October 8, 1993, against the Detroit Red Wings, preceded by a 20-minute pregame show at the cost of $450,000. The Ducks lost 7–2. Since then, the arena has been host to a number of events, such as the 2003 and 2007 Stanley Cup Finals. On June 6, 2007, the Anaheim Ducks defeated the Ottawa Senators, 6–2, in game five of the Final at Honda Center to clinch the franchise's first Stanley Cup championship.

Honda Center has hosted several UFC events, starting with UFC 59 in 2006. It hosted the 2005 IBF World Championships for badminton in 2005.

From 1994 to 1999, it served as a second home for the NBA's Los Angeles Clippers. It was the home arena for the Anaheim Bullfrogs of Roller Hockey International from 1994 to 1999 and for the Anaheim Piranhas of the Arena Football League from 1996 to 1997.

This arena has also hosted a PBR Bud Light Cup (later Built Ford Tough Series) event annually since 1998. Since 1994, the arena has hosted the annual Wooden Legacy basketball tournament. In April 2000, it played host to the WWE's 16th annual WrestleMania supercard event.

In 2011, the arena began hosting the Big West Conference Men's and Women's Basketball tournaments. The arena has also hosted the NCAA men's basketball tournament seven times, as the West Regional site – 1998, 2001, 2003, 2008, 2011, 2014, 2016 and 2019. It even hosted the Frozen Four, the semifinals and final of the NCAA Men's Ice Hockey Championship, in 1999, underscoring the popularity of hockey in the region.

On December 6, 2000, music legend Tina Turner played her last concert at the arena for the record breaking Twenty Four Seven Tour, but after popular demand, Turner returned to the arena before a sellout crowd on October 14, 2008, for her Tina!: 50th Anniversary Tour.

Honda Center lies northeast across California State Route 57 from Angel Stadium (the home stadium of Major League Baseball's Los Angeles Angels) and roughly 3 miles (4.8 km) from Disneyland Park. It is also across the street from Anaheim Regional Transportation Intermodal Center with service by Amtrak (Pacific Surfliner), Metrolink (Orange County Line), Anaheim Resort Transit, Orange County Transportation Authority and private transportation companies.

The arena seats up to 17,174 for its primary tenant, the Ducks. It takes only five hours to convert Honda Center from a sporting arena to an 8,400-seat amphitheater. There are 84 luxury suites in the building, which has hosted 17.5 million people, as of 2003. In 2005, the arena became the first in the U.S. to have two full levels of 360° ribbon displays installed. Daktronics of Brookings, South Dakota, designed, manufactured and installed the 1,800 feet (550 m) of full-color LED technology. Outside the venue, the marquee was upgraded with two large video displays measuring 8 feet (2.4 m) high by 21 feet (6.4 m), and a new marquee was built with more LED video displays.

Broadcom chairman Henry Samueli owns the company that operates the arena, Anaheim Arena Management, LLC, and the arena's primary tenant, the Ducks, giving him great flexibility in scheduling events and recruiting new tenants. AAM was founded in 2003 to take over operations of the arena from the bankrupt Ogden Corp., which had already sold the arena's concession deal to Aramark in 2000 - who remained providing foods and drinks until 2013, when concessions became an in-house operation.

During the 2014–2015 NHL Season, it was announced that Honda Center would get a new scoreboard that will replace the one that was in place since its opening in 1993. The new scoreboard made its debut in a Ducks pre-season game against the Los Angeles Kings.

In March 2020, the arena would lose all its scheduled events because of the COVID-19 pandemic. For the rest of the year, Honda Center would instead host charity events, such as blood drives, food bank distributions, and a collective wedding, along with serving as a drive-through voting location for the 2020 United States presidential election. The Ducks would only play again in the arena once the following NHL season started in January 2021, with a reduced audience of 2,000 being allowed to attend the final five games of the season, starting with an April 17 matchup with the Vegas Golden Knights.

In April 2025, it was announced that Honda Center would undergo a major $1 billion renovation that would be complete by 2027, one year before the 2028 Summer Olympics. The renovations will create a brand new entrance on the southern part of the arena, add escalators and club suites, and increase parking as part of the larger mixed use OC Vibe project taking place near the arena.

== Notable events ==
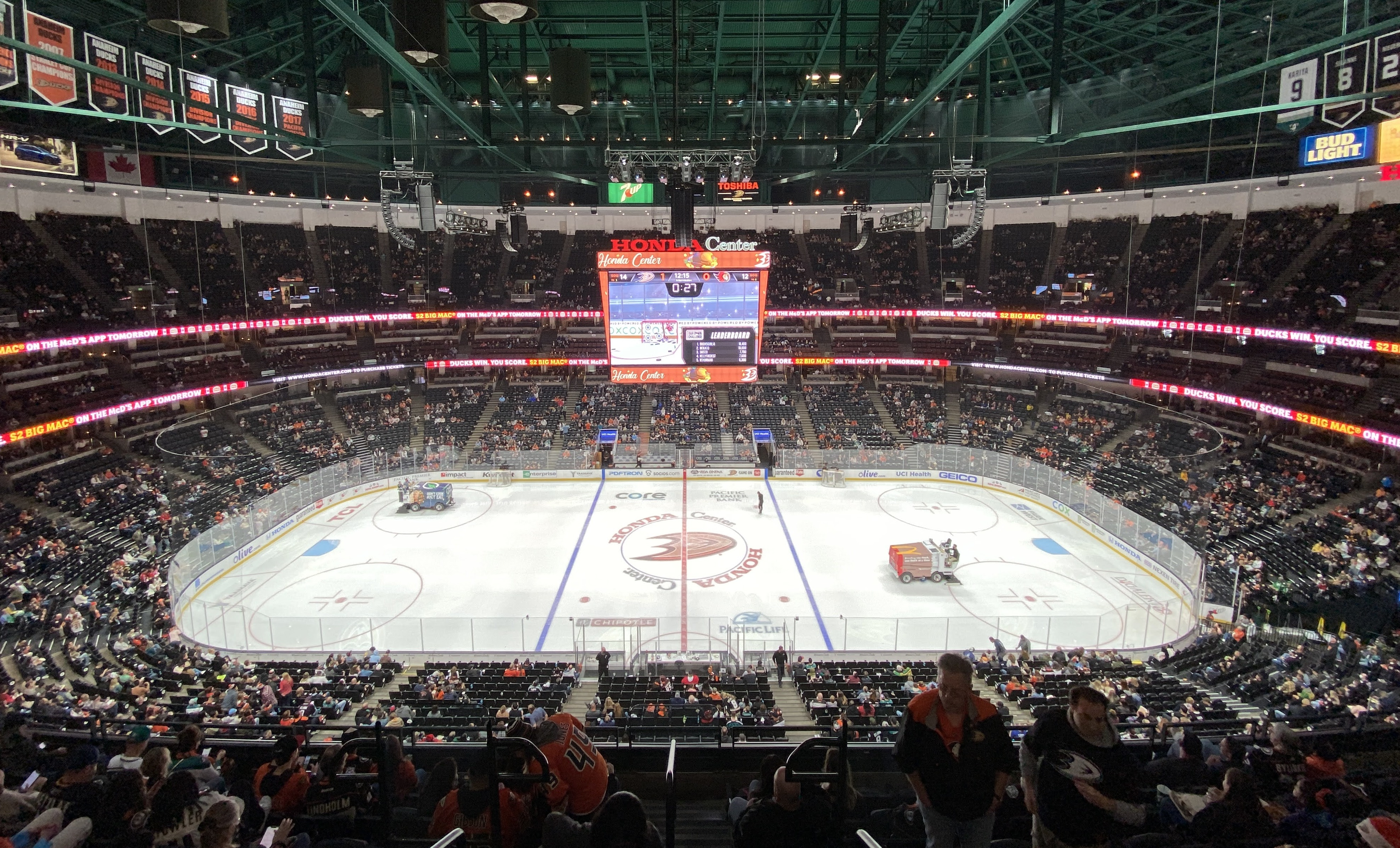
Interior of Honda Center in 2021

=== Ice hockey ===
- 1999 Frozen Four
- Games 3, 4, and 6 of the 2003 Stanley Cup Finals
- Games 1, 2, and 5 of the 2007 Stanley Cup Finals. The Stanley Cup was presented to the Ducks on home ice after they won their first championship.

=== Combat sports ===
- Affliction: Banned was held in the Honda Center.
- UFC 59: Reality Check, UFC 63: Hughes vs. Penn 2, UFC 76: Knockout, UFC 121: Lesnar vs. Velasquez, UFC on Fox: Velasquez vs. dos Santos, UFC 157: Rousey vs. Carmouche, UFC 214: Cormier vs. Jones 2, UFC 241: Cormier vs. Miocic 2, UFC 270: Ngannou vs. Gane and UFC 298: Volkanovski vs. Topuria were held in the Honda Center.
- The arena has hosted Bellator 160.
- The arena has hosted a number of WWE events including WrestleMania XII, Royal Rumble 1999, WrestleMania 2000, as well as various episodes of Monday Night Raw and SmackDown.

=== Concerts ===
Honda Center has the second highest gross ticket sales from special events on the West Coast, following only Crypto.com Arena. These events have included the following over the years:

- Barbra Streisand recorded the final date here from her first tour in 30 years Barbra Streisand in Concert in June 1994.
- Whitney Houston performed on August 21, 1994, during her The Bodyguard World Tour.
- AC/DC brought their Ballbreaker World Tour to the arena on February 13, 1996. They then brought their Black Ice World Tour to the arena on September 8, 2009.
- Smashing Pumpkins performed on December 9 and December 10, 1996, as part of their Mellon Collie and the Infinite Sadness tour. They then returned to the arena on November 16, 2022, for their Spirits on Fire Tour.
- Rock band No Doubt, natives of Anaheim, recorded their two 1997 concert stops at the Pond, releasing them as their first concert video, Live in the Tragic Kingdom.
- Celine Dion performed at Honda Arena on October 22, 1998, as part of her Let's Talk About Love World Tour.
- Janet Jackson performed for the first time at the arena during her The Velvet Rope Tour on August 23, 1998. She returned for her All for You Tour on September 29, 2001, and returned on September 23, 2017, as part of her State of the World Tour. Jackson will perform at the arena for the fourth time on June 9, 2024, as part of her Together Again tour.
- Marilyn Manson performed here on March 13, 1999, during the Beautiful Monsters Tour.
- Santana performed a sold-out four night run at the arena from August 11 to August 14, 1999, during their Supernatural Tour.
- TLC performed at the arena on January 7, 2000, during their FanMail Tour. The tour would be their last as a trio. Band member Lisa "Left Eye" Lopes was killed in a car accident in April 2002.
- Shakira showed up in the arena for the first time on April 19, 2000, with Tour Anfibio. She returned to the venue on November 12, 2002, with Tour of the Mongoose, August 17, 2006 with Oral Fixation Tour, October 25, 2010 with The Sun Comes Out World Tour and August 31, 2018, with El Dorado World Tour.
- Dr. Dre and Snoop Dogg performed here on June 16 & June 18, 2000, during their Up In Smoke Tour.
- Britney Spears performed on 20 November 2001 during her Dream Within a Dream Tour. She returned on April 19 and 20, 2009 for her The Circus Starring Britney Spears and on June 24, 2011, with her Femme Fatale Tour.
- KIIS-FM's Jingle Ball – December 19, 2002, December 3, 2004, December 7, 2006, October 27, 2007, and December 6, 2008
- Beyoncé first performed there alongside Alicia Keys and Missy Elliott on 17 and 21 April 2004 during their joint tour called 'Verizon Ladies First Tour'. She later returned as a solo act on September 1, 2007, as part of her tour 'The Beyoncé Experience', and again on July 11, 2009, during her 'I Am... Tour'. Throughout her whole career, she sold over 40,000 tickets and grossed over 4 million dollars at the venue with only 4 reported shows.
- Madonna performed at the arena on June 2 and 3, 2004 during her Re-Invention World Tour.
- Destiny's Child performed at the arena on September 1, 2005, during their tour 'Destiny Fulfilled... and Lovin' It'.
- When No Doubt's lead singer, Gwen Stefani embarked on a solo venture, she filmed her two homecoming concerts at the arena in November 2005. The DVD was released as Harajuku Lovers Live.
- Mariah Carey's latest DVD release, entitled The Adventures of Mimi was recorded at the Honda Center on October 8, 2006, during The Adventures of Mimi Tour.
- The Jonas Brothers recorded the companion album to their 3-D concert movie at the Honda Center.
- U2 performed at the arena five times: the first, the second and the third were on April 23, 24 and 26, 2001 during their Elevation Tour, in front of a total sold-out crowd of 49,377 people. The fourth and the fifth were on April 1 and 2, 2005 during their Vertigo Tour, in front of a total sold-out crowd of 33,535 people.
- Depeche Mode performed at the arena seven times. The first and the second were on December 20 and 22, 1998 during their Singles Tour. The third and the fourth were on August 18 and 19, 2001 during their Exciter Tour. The fifth one was on November 23, 2005, during their Touring the Angel. The sixth one was on August 19, 2009, during their Tour of the Universe, in front of a crowd of 12,430 people. The 2009 show was recorded for the group's live albums project Recording the Universe. The seventh was on May 22, 2018, during their Global Spirit Tour.
- K-pop artists under S.M. Entertainment featuring BoA, TVXQ, Super Junior, Girls' Generation, SHINee, f(x) and EXO, performed the first show of their third world tour SMTown Live '12 World Tour making them the first Korean artists to perform at the arena. The May 20, 2012, show was an instant sell out. South Korean TV broadcast network MBC filmed and later aired an edited version of the concert.
- Jennifer Lopez brought her Dance Again World Tour to the arena on August 11, 2012.
- K-pop boy band BIGBANG performed their first concert in the U.S. at the arena on November 2 and 3, 2012 as part of their Alive Galaxy Tour. They returned to the arena on October 4, 2015, for their Made World Tour.
- Demi Lovato brought The Neon Lights Tour on February 13, 2014. She returned along with Nick Jonas for their Future Now Tour at the arena on August 17, 2016. She also brought her It's Not That Deep Tour to the arena on May 9, 2026.
- Katy Perry brought The Prismatic World Tour to the arena on September 16 and 17, 2014. She later brought The Lifetimes Tour to the arena on July 13, 2025.
- Miley Cyrus performed at the center during her Bangerz World Tour on February 20, 2014, making it Cyrus' 3rd sold-out concert at the Honda Center after previously selling out the arena during her Best of Both Worlds Tour on November 3, 2007, and again during her Wonder World Tour on September 23, 2009.
- Metallica brought their Madly in Anger with the World Tour to the arena on November 27, 2004. They then brought their World Magnetic Tour to the arena on December 10, 2009.
- Maroon 5 brought their Maroon V Tour to the arena on April 6, 2015.
- Ariana Grande brought The Honeymoon Tour to the arena on April 10, 2015. She returned to the arena on March 30, 2017, for the Dangerous Woman Tour and again on December 13, 2019, for the Sweetener World Tour.
- Chris Brown performed for a sold-out crowd during his One Hell of a Nite Tour on September 18, 2015.
- Selena Gomez brought her Revival Tour to the arena on July 9, 2016.
- Pentatonix brought their Pentatonix World Tour 2016 to the arena on October 20, 2016.
- Twenty One Pilots brought their Emotional Roadshow World Tour to the arena on February 15 and 16, 2017. They came back to the arena for The Bandito Tour on November 2, 2019, and then for The Icy Tour on September 17, 2022.
- BTS brought their 2017 BTS Live Trilogy Episode III: The Wings Tour to the arena on April 1 and 2, 2017.
- Live Nation hosted their 2017 Southern California Country Megaticket at the center due to the lease being up at Irvine Meadows Amphitheater which has been demolished to make way for housing.
- Kendrick Lamar brought The Damn. Tour to the arena on August 11, 2017.
- Jay-Z brought his 4:44 Tour to the arena on October 27, 2017.
- Mayday brought their Life Tour to the arena on November 11, 2017.
- Imagine Dragons brought their Evolve Tour to the arena on November 16, 2017.
- Fall Out Boy brought their Mania Tour to the arena on September 29, 2018.
- Ghost brought their Imperatour to the arena on March 3, 2022. They brought the Skeletour to the arena in 2026.
- For King & Country brought their What Are We Waiting For Tour to the arena on May 7, 2022. They also brought their A Drummer Boy Christmas Tour to the arena on December 9, 2023.
- Stray Kids brought their Maniac World Tour to the arena on July 19 and 20, 2022.
- Iron Maiden brought their Legacy of the Beast World Tour to the arena on September 21 and 22, 2022.
- Enhypen brought their Manifesto Tour to the arena on October 2 and 3, 2022.
- Karol G brought her Strip Love Tour to the arena on October 15, 2022.
- Phil Wickham brought his Behold Christmas Tour to the arena on December 10, 2022, with Anne Wilson and Brandon Lake. The show was live-streamed on his YouTube channel.
- NCT Dream brought their The Dream Show 2 - In A Dream Tour to the arena on April 18, 2023.
- Doja Cat brought The Scarlet Tour to the arena on November 6, 2023.
- Melanie Martinez brought her The Trilogy Tour to the arena on June 27, 2024.
- Jin will perform 2 shows as part of his RunSeokjin Ep. Tour on July 17–18, 2025.
- Benson Boone brought his American Heart World Tour to the arena on September 28, 2025.
- Sombr will perform at the arena for his You Are The Reason Tour on October 9, 2026.
- V-Beyond Concert, featuring Vietnamese pop artists, will be held at the arena on November 21, 2026.

=== Other ===
The Arrowhead Pond became the setting for the climax game in D2: The Mighty Ducks

As part of the Walt Disney Company's biennal D23 convention in 2024, the Disney Entertainment showcase, Disney Experiences showcase, and Disney Legends award ceremony were hosted at Honda Center, with 12,000 fans in attendance.

Honda Center and OC Vibe will host the final rounds of the 2027 FIVB Women's Volleyball World Cup.

The arena will host indoor volleyball during the 2028 Summer Olympics.

== Capacity ==
Hockey
Years	Capacity
1993–1994	17,200
1994–present	17,174
With standing room	At least 17,622

Basketball
Years	Capacity
1993–2000	18,200
2000–2011	17,608
2011–present	18,336
With standing room	At least 18,521

Other Events
Event	Capacity
Concerts, center stage	18,900
Concerts, end stage	18,325
Theatre at the Honda Center	8,400

=== Largest Crowds ===
Hockey					Basketball				
#	Date	Opponent	Score	Attendance	#	Date	Opponent	Score	Attendance
1	Oct. 14, 2025	Penguins at Ducks	4–3, ANA	17,622 (102.61%)	1	Mar. 12, 1998	Lakers at Clippers	108–85, LAL	18,521 (101.76%)
2	Mar. 20, 2013	Blackhawks at Ducks	4–2, ANA	17,610 (102.54%)	2	Feb. 4, 1997	Lakers at Clippers	108–86, LAC	18,462 (101.44%)
3	Feb. 26, 2012	Blackhawks at Ducks	3–1, ANA	17,601 (102.49%)	3	Feb. 25, 1999	Lakers at Clippers	115–100, LAL	18,456 (101.41%)
4	May 12, 2009	Red Wings at Ducks	6-3, DET	17,601 (102.49%)	4	Dec. 2, 1995	Bulls at Clippers	104–98, CHI	18,321 (100.66%)
5	Jan. 2, 2009	Flyers at Ducks	5–4, PHI (SO)	17,597 (102.46%)	5	Apr. 12, 1997	Nuggets at Clippers	116–94, LAC	18,211 (100.06%)

== See also ==
- Anaheim Ducks
- Angel Stadium
- List of indoor arenas in the United States

== Notes ==
Events and tenants
Preceded by First arena	Home of the Anaheim Ducks; 1993–present	Succeeded by Current
Preceded by Hartford Civic Center; First Union Center	Host of WrestleMania; 1996; 2000	Succeeded by Rosemont Horizon; Reliant Astrodome
Preceded by San Jose Arena	Home of the Royal Rumble; 1999	Succeeded by Madison Square Garden
Preceded by FleetCenter; Boston, Massachusetts	Host of the men's Frozen Four; 1999	Succeeded by Providence Civic Center; Providence, Rhode Island
