= Golden Bear (nightclub) =

Nightclub in Huntington Beach, California

- Former names: Golden Lion Cafe
- Type: nightclub
- Events: rock and roll, folk music

Construction
- Opened: 1923
- Closed: 1986
- Demolished: 1986

The Golden Bear was a nightclub in Huntington Beach, California, from 1923 to 1986. The Golden Bear was located on Pacific Coast Highway, just south of Main Street. It started out as a restaurant, and eventually hosted such artists as Dick Dale, Janis Joplin, Arlo Guthrie, Stevie Ray Vaughan, The Doors, Jackson Browne, Jimi Hendrix, Joan Jett & the Blackhearts, Dave Mason, Tower of Power, The Chambers Brothers, José Feliciano, Hoyt Axton, Bonnie Raitt, Rory Gallagher, Bill Monroe, Steve Martin, Linda Ronstadt and Jerry Garcia.

== Early history ==
The Golden Bear started as The Golden Lion Cafe at 226 Main Street in Huntington Beach and was founded by Harry Bakre in 1923. The name was changed to The Golden Bear Cafe in 1926 to avoid any legal issues with Bakre's former employer with the same name. It moved to its location at 306 Pacific Coast Highway (then called Ocean Avenue) on June 29, 1929, shortly before the Great Depression. It continued as a restaurant until Bakre retired in 1951. After that the building was the home to various restaurants. After Bakre's death in 1957, the building was vacant except for an art supply store in its front section.

== Delbert Kauffman (1963–1966) ==
In 1963, Delbert Kauffman took over and established the Golden Bear as a folk music club. The first act they hosted was Les Baxter's Balladeers, featuring a young David Crosby. Other artists that were booked at the Golden Bear under Kauffman were Hoyt Axton, Lovin' Spoonful, and Buffalo Springfield. Bob Dylan appeared at a Golden Bear Presents concert at Long Beach Wilson High School in December 1964. During this time Peter Tork, later of The Monkees, worked as a dishwasher at the club before becoming famous as a musician. However, by 1966 Kauffman was bankrupt and closed the club. Kauffman has lived in Takilma, Oregon for decades.

== George Nikas (1966–1974) ==
George Nikas reopened the club in 1966, and began booking rock bands as music evolved. Musicians performing during this time period included Janis Joplin, Neil Young, The Flying Burrito Brothers, Jimmy Reed, Seals and Crofts, Richie Havens, and others. The Doors and Jimi Hendrix are also reported to have played at the Golden Bear, although other sources indicate that Kauffman and Nikas both stated otherwise. By the early 1970s, Nikas felt he was ready to sell the business.

== Babiracki trio (1974–1986) ==
In 1974, brothers Rick and Chuck Babiracki, and Rick's wife, Carole, purchased the Golden Bear. They continued to book a diverse list of entertainers, such as Jeff Lorber Fusion with Kenny G, Muddy Waters, Jerry Garcia, Patti Smith, Cheap Trick, The Ramones, The Bongos, Agent Orange, Arlo Guthrie, Maria Muldaur, Peter Gabriel and comedian Steve Martin.

In 1979 the artist Wyland, who lived next door, painted the outside wall of the building. It showed musical notes and some of the artists that performed at the venue. Wyland later became famous for his Whaling Walls.

== Closure ==
The Golden Bear closed because of the costs involved in retrofitting the brick building for seismic compliance and the redevelopment of downtown Huntington Beach. The last performance was on January 29, 1986, by Robin Trower.

== Postclosure ==
In 1990, an attempt was made to resurrect the Golden Bear as "Pepper's Golden Bear" in the new building on the original site. An unknown Will Ferrell made his stand-up comedy debut at the club during this period. However, it closed after six months. In 2010, Joe Daichendt, co-owner of Pierside Pavilion, proposed a new, $2 million, 7,500-square-foot (700 m^{2}) Golden Bear. The venue would be built at the site of movie theaters that closed in 2006.

Huntington Beach celebrated memories of the club for the city's centennial celebration in September 2009, with a two-day Golden Bear reunion at the Hilton Waterfront Beach Resort, a few blocks from the original location. Honk, David Lindley, Ray Manzarek of The Doors, the Nitty Gritty Dirt Band, Chris Hillman and Herb Pederson were among the performers for the city's 100-year anniversary. In 2014, the city unveiled a commemorative plaque honoring the venue on the wall of the Pierside Pavilion.

There is a planned revival of the nightclub in the works, set to open at OC Vibe in Anaheim in late 2028.
