= Anaheim Regional Transportation Intermodal Center =

Transit center in Anaheim, California, United States

Anaheim, CA
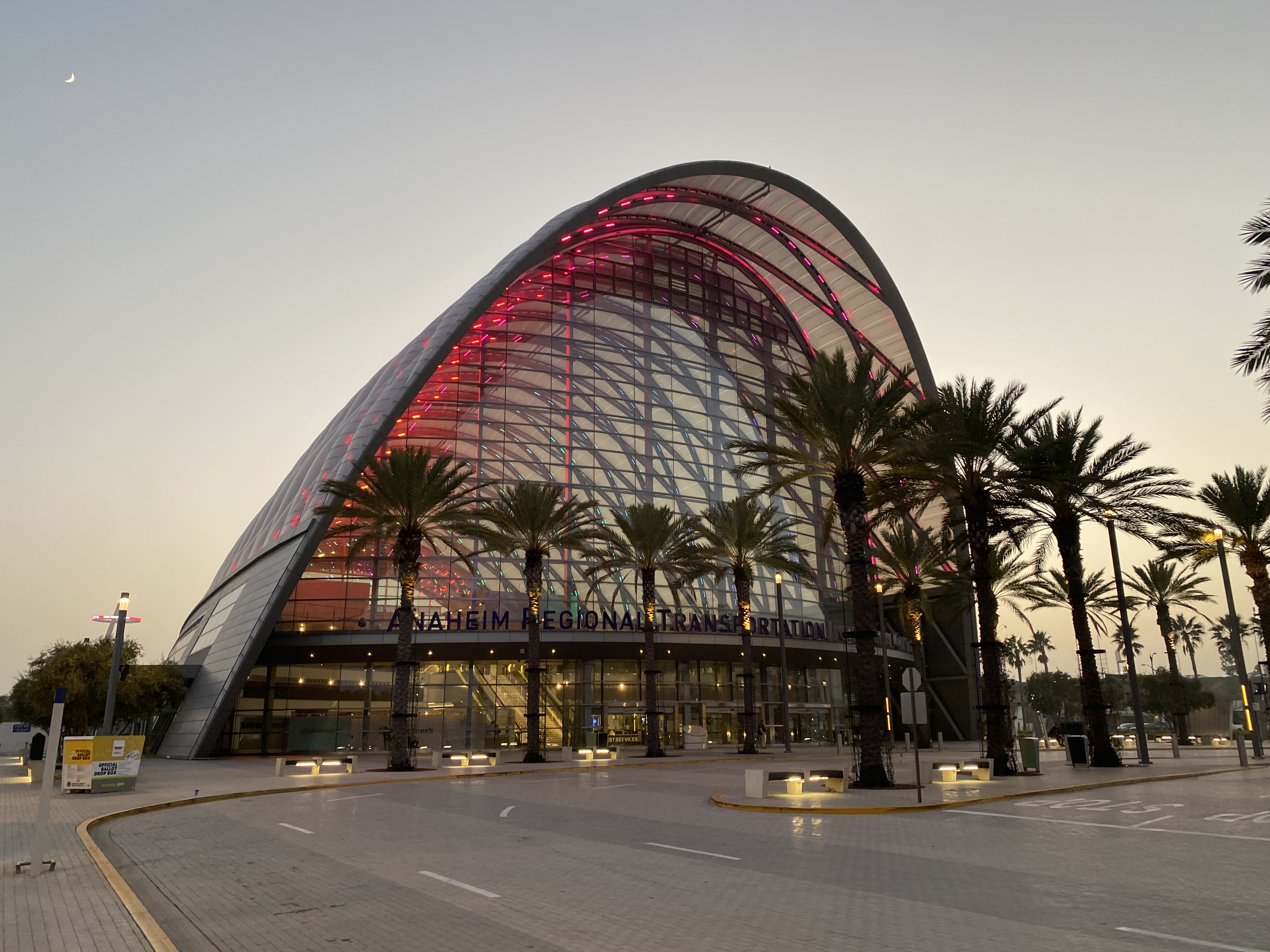
- The front of the ARTIC in 2024

General information
- Other names: Anaheim Regional Transportation Intermodal Center (ARTIC)
- Location: 2626 East Katella Avenue; Anaheim, California; United States
- Coordinates: 33°48′12″N 117°52′39″W
- Owner: City of Anaheim
- Operator: Anaheim Arena Management
- Line: SCRRA Orange Subdivision
- Platforms: 2 side platforms
- Tracks: 2
- Train operators: Amtrak, Metrolink
- Bus routes: OC Bus: 50, 53, Rapid! 553
- Bus stands: 13
- Bus operators: Greyhound Lines, Megabus, Flixbus, OC Bus, Tres Estrellas de Oro

Construction
- Structure type: 67,000 square feet (6,200 m^{2}), three-floor terminal
- Parking: 1,082 spaces
- Cycle facilities: Racks and 12 lockers
- Accessible: Yes

Other information
- Status: Staffed, station building with waiting room
- Station code: Amtrak: ANA

History
- Opened: 1984 (Anaheim–Stadium station); December 6, 2014 (ARTIC)

Passengers
- FY 2025: 207,870 annually (Amtrak)
- FY 2026: 315 weekday boardings (Metrolink)

Services
Preceding station	Amtrak	Following station
Fullerton toward San Luis Obispo	Pacific Surfliner	Santa Ana toward San Diego
Preceding station	Metrolink	Following station
Fullerton toward L.A. Union Station	Orange County Line	Orange toward Oceanside
Former services
Preceding station	Atchison, Topeka and Santa Fe Railway	Following station
Fullerton toward Los Angeles	Surf Line	Orange toward San Diego
Future services
Preceding station	California High-Speed Rail	Following station
Los Angeles toward Merced or San Francisco	Phase 1	Terminus
Location

The Anaheim Regional Transportation Intermodal Center (ARTIC) is a transit center in Anaheim, California, United States. The intermodal hub serves as a train station for Amtrak intercity rail and Metrolink commuter rail, as well as a bus station used by the Orange County Transportation Authority (OCTA), Anaheim Resort Transportation (ART), Greyhound, Megabus, Flixbus and Tres Estrellas de Oro.

ARTIC opened in 2014 and replaced Anaheim–Stadium station, a nearby depot and train platforms used by Amtrak and Metrolink that first opened in 1984. Designed by the global architecture firm HOK, the steel-framed ARTIC building's entrance is a 120-foot-tall (37 m) glass wall. The structure has a compound curved shell that is covered with air-filled plastic pillows through which sunlight illuminates the interior. The arched roof is illuminated with multicolored lights visible from the surrounding area.

ARTIC is located in the Platinum Triangle and near the Anaheim Resort, areas of Anaheim which include major points of interest. It is accessible by bicycle from the Santa Ana River Trail and is adjacent to California State Route 57.

== Transit oriented development ==
ARTIC was planned to be part of the redevelopment of the surrounding area with transit oriented development in the Platinum Triangle. As of 2019, the station was within 25 miles (40 km) of a population of 7,704,578 residents and 50 miles (80 km) of a population of 15,056,614 residents.

In 2022, the city council approved OC Vibe which will build a parking structure for the station on the other side of Douglass Road as the current parking area is included in the proposed mixed-use entertainment district around the Honda Center. Funding was approved in 2023 for an elevated pedestrian pathway that will include a bridge over Katella Avenue.

The 16-acre (6.5 ha) site is near two freeways: State Route 57, and Interstate 5. The Honda Center is across Katella Avenue on the north side of the site and one of the three gates to Angel Stadium can be reached southwesterly through the Douglass Road underpass. The station has direct access to the Santa Ana River Trail and bicycle racks and lockers. This Metrolink Station also links Disneyland Resort through Anaheim Resort Transportation ARTIC Sports Complex Line 15.

During the 2028 Summer Olympics, the station will serve spectators traveling to and from the adjacent Honda Center which will host indoor volleyball.

Besides local bus service provided by OCTA and ART, travel service to intercity/international destinations is provided from the complex. Megabus began a bus service between the terminal, Los Angeles, San Jose, Oakland, and San Francisco when the rail station opened in 2014. Greyhound also began operations the same day at the new center, which is about three miles from their former depot. Tres Estrellas de Oro moved their services to Tijuana and Guadalajara, Mexico, into the station in January 2016.

The ARTIC site is the proposed location of a California High-Speed Rail station. It was the proposed southern terminus of the California–Nevada Interstate Maglev and the eastern terminus of Anaheim Rapid Connection, a proposed streetcar system that would have connected various destinations in the Anaheim Resort and Platinum Triangle areas.

== History of rail service ==
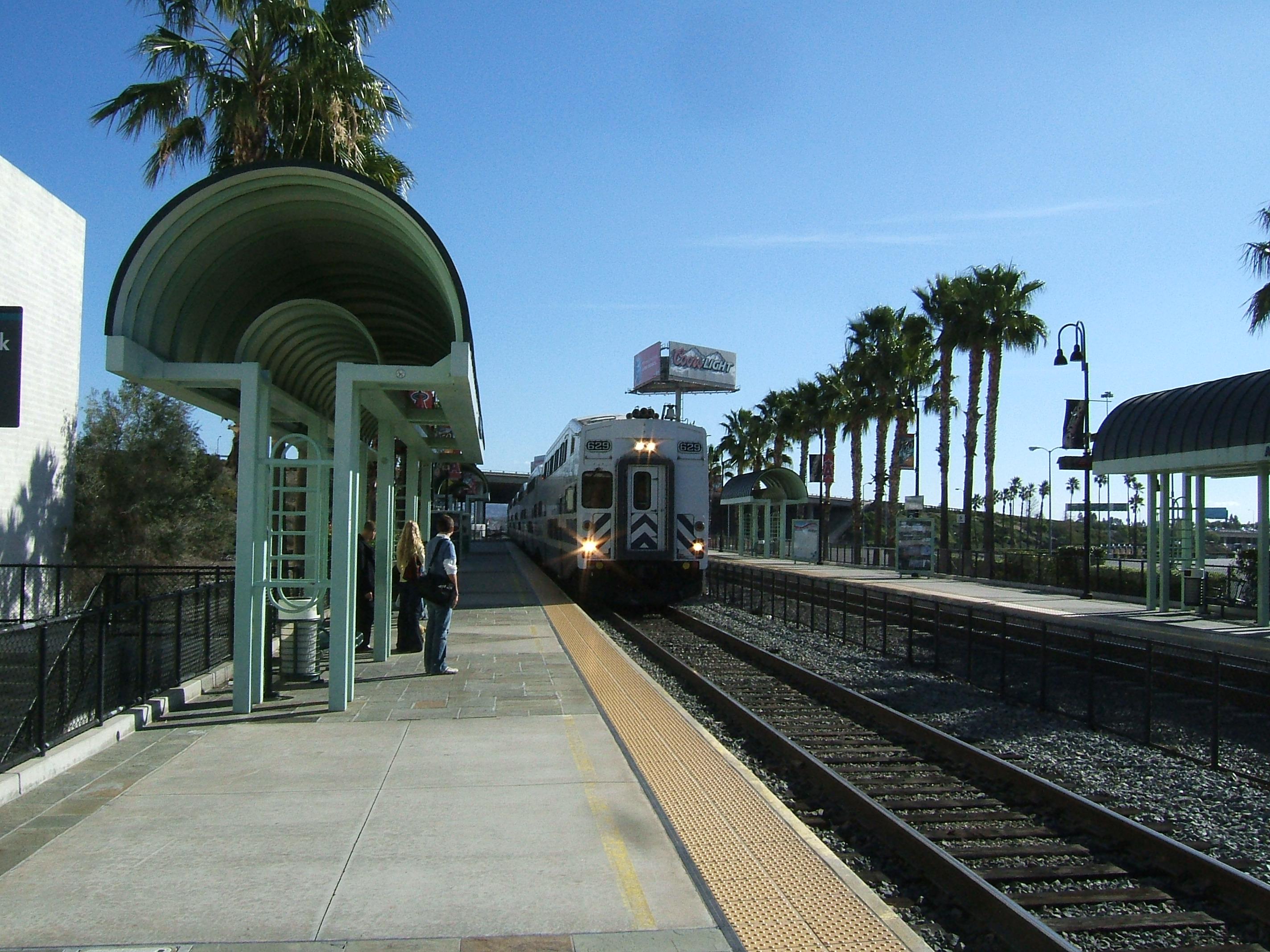
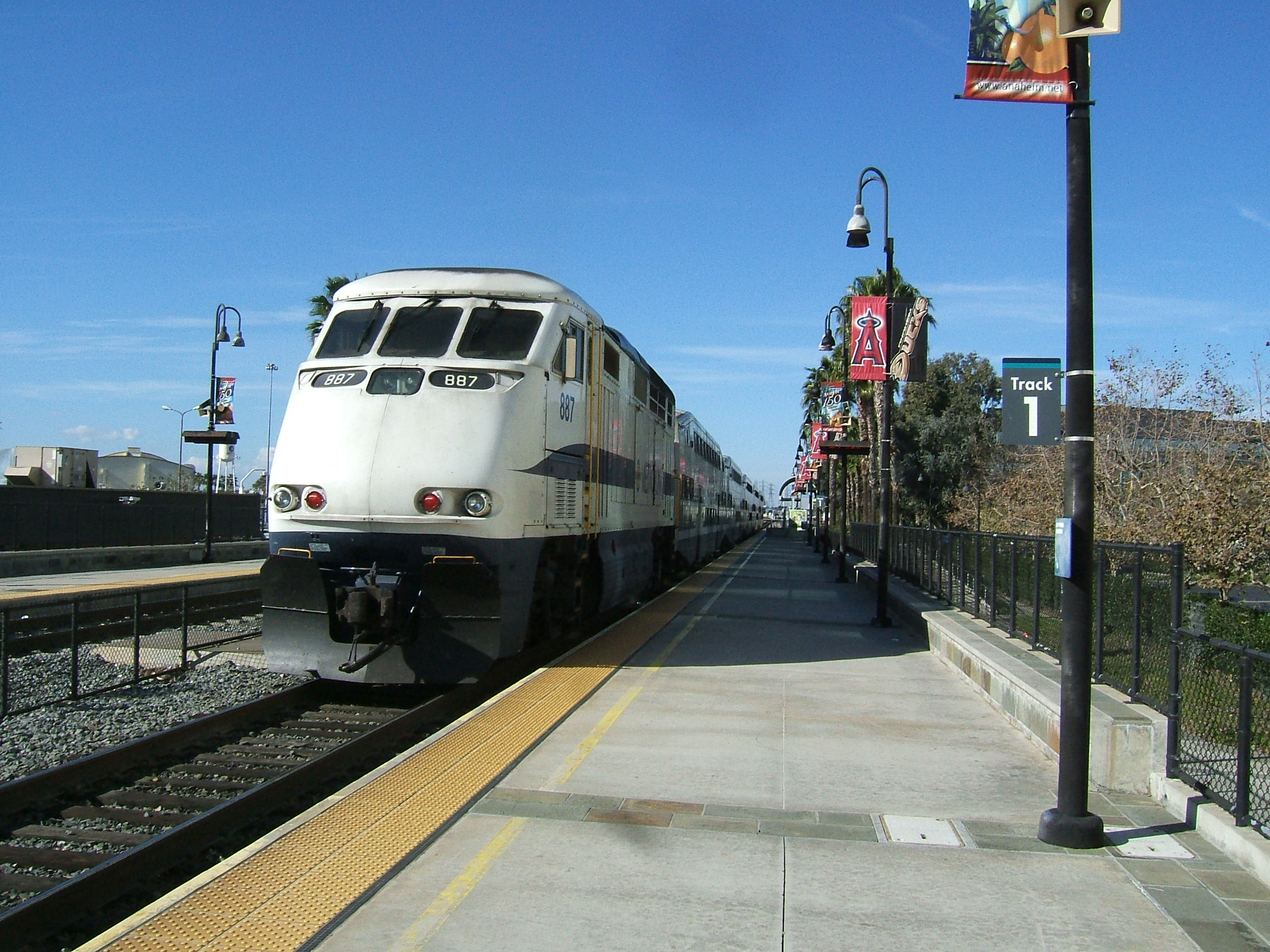
The platforms at the previous station in 2007

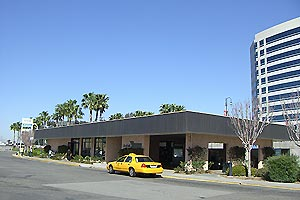
Previous station building

A branch of the Southern Pacific Railway was extended to Anaheim in 1875. In 1887, a rail line to San Diego was built through the Town by Santa Fe Railway. By 1921, there were two Southern Pacific depots and one Santa Fe depot. The Pacific Electric Railway was also planning on a line to connect with the community. Eventually these rail services were discontinued but rail service began again when the city of Anaheim provided a station in 1984 for the Amtrak San Diegan on property on the connections side of the State Route 57 freeway belonging to the Atchison, Topeka & Santa Fe Railroad. In October 1986 a new standard design station was constructed about 600 feet (180 m) northwest to a site where Anaheim Stadium was just across the parking lot, appropriately referred to as Anaheim–Stadium. The station was built to a model 75C Amtrak Standard Stations Program design, measuring 81 by 45 feet (25 by 14 m), and designed to accommodate 75 people at a time, with seating for 48. When it was being planned, it was anticipated that it could become among the top-twenty trafficked Amtrak stations in the nation in terms of ridership. The San Diegan moniker was retired on June 1, 2000, when the service became known as the Pacific Surfliner.

The Orange County Line began service to the station in 1990 as the Orange County Commuter, an Amtrak-operated service between Los Angeles and San Juan Capistrano. In 1994, the line became Metrolink's fifth route known as the Orange County Line with the purchase of the railroad right-of-way, Surf Line, from Santa Fe. The Inland Empire–Orange County Line that runs from San Bernardino through Orange County to Oceanside does not stop here but at nearby Anaheim Canyon. Both Metrolink lines stop at Orange, the next stop to the south. An average of 500 Metrolink and 400 Amtrak passengers boarded trains daily in the last year of operation of the previous Anaheim station.

The station is the proposed southern terminus of the first phase of the California High-Speed Rail project that would run north to Salesforce Transit Center in San Francisco.

== Site development and construction ==
Interactive map of the former and current Anaheim stations
1 The now-demolished Anaheim–Stadium station depot was located on the west side of State Route 57 adjacent to the Angel Stadium parking lot.
2 The current ARTIC building is on the east side of State Route 57.

The current site was formerly occupied by the Orange County "Katella Yard" with outdated facilities for the county surveyor, the agricultural commissioner, public works transportation, watershed protection, and flood control operations and maintenance. Orange County Transportation Authority (OCTA) was the lead agency in acquiring the 13.5-acre (5.5 ha) property from the county. On November 21, 2006, the Orange County Board of Supervisors approved the sale and relocation of their operations to clear the site for the new complex. In July 2012, the city of Anaheim, which already owned 2.2 acres (0.89 ha) of the site, agreed to buy the balance of the property from OCTA for $32.5 million as they could not come to terms over a lease. Anaheim will make payments to OCTA over 14 years at a 2 percent simple-interest rate.

California Environmental Quality Act (CEQA) clearance was completed in October 2010 and the National Environmental Policy Act (NEPA) clearance was completed in 2012. KTGY Architecture + Planning was responsible for obtaining approvals, entitlements and creating the land plan. The team of PB/HOK completed design development in May 2012. The construction contract was awarded to Clark Construction Group-California, LP. A groundbreaking ceremony for the facility took place in September 2012 and train service began on December 6, 2014. A 30-year lease agreement was approved in January 2013 to allow the Orange County Water District to construct an injection water well and appurtenant facilities on the site.

=== Construction finances ===
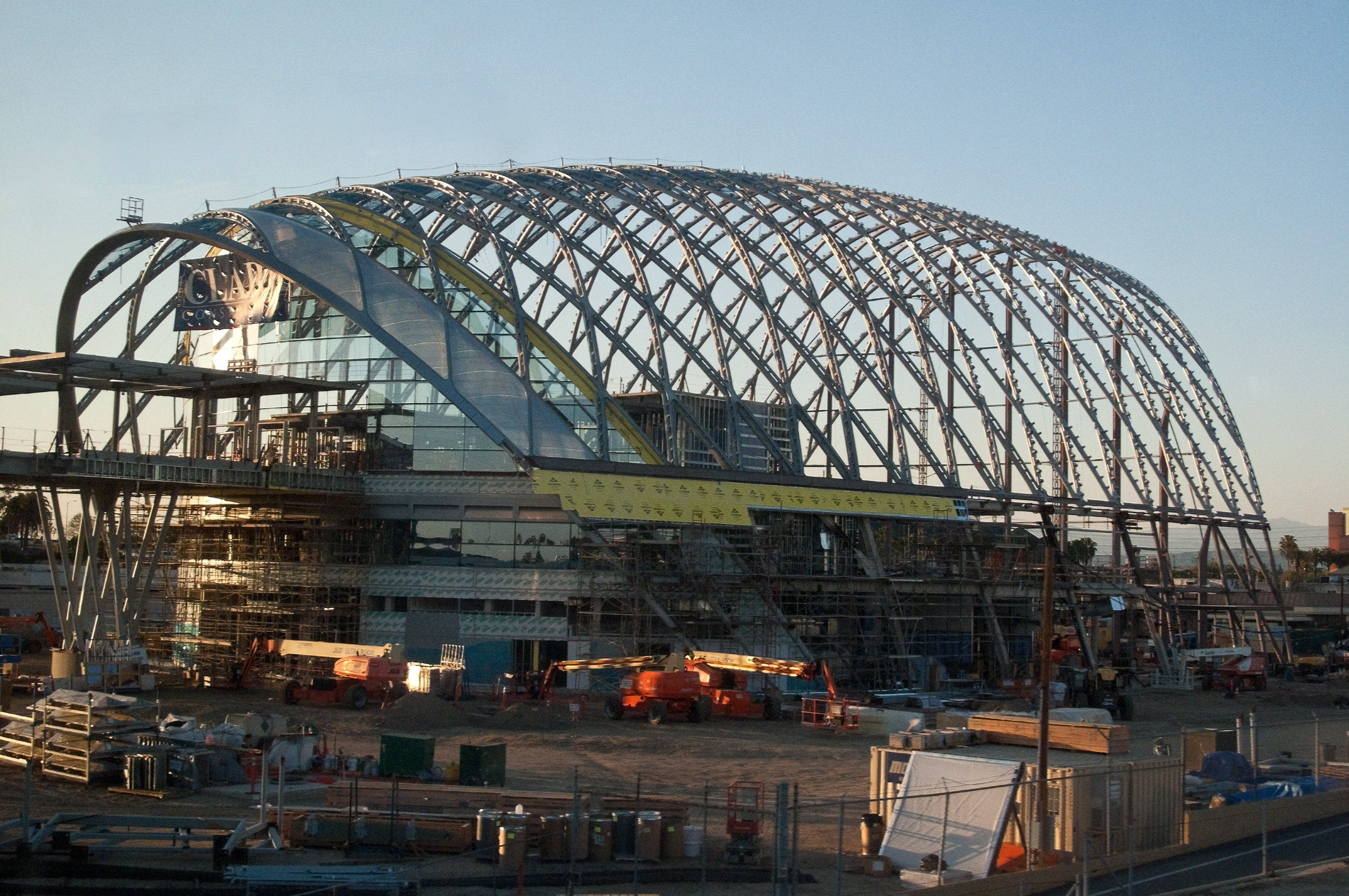
ARTIC under construction in 2014.

The main terminal was about $68 million of the total construction cost of $185 million. Operation and maintenance of the terminal was expected to cost $5 million annually but was reduced to $3.8 during the first year though various cost savings, including having the city division of conventions, sports and entertainment take over management.

Measure M, a sales tax that funds transportation projects, was the main funding source for the construction of ARTIC. The overall $120 million construction of ARTIC along with environmental studies and connections aspects of the project put the total price tag closer to $185.2 million. The main terminal was about $68 million of the cost. A conflict between Metrolink and Amtrak over the platform's height so that it could be used by accessible passengers was one of the biggest issues that had to be resolved during the construction. The redesign of the train platform added extra costs along with expenses for rail improvements but the project was within the project budget as there was a $6 million contingency fund for unanticipated costs.

== Structure ==
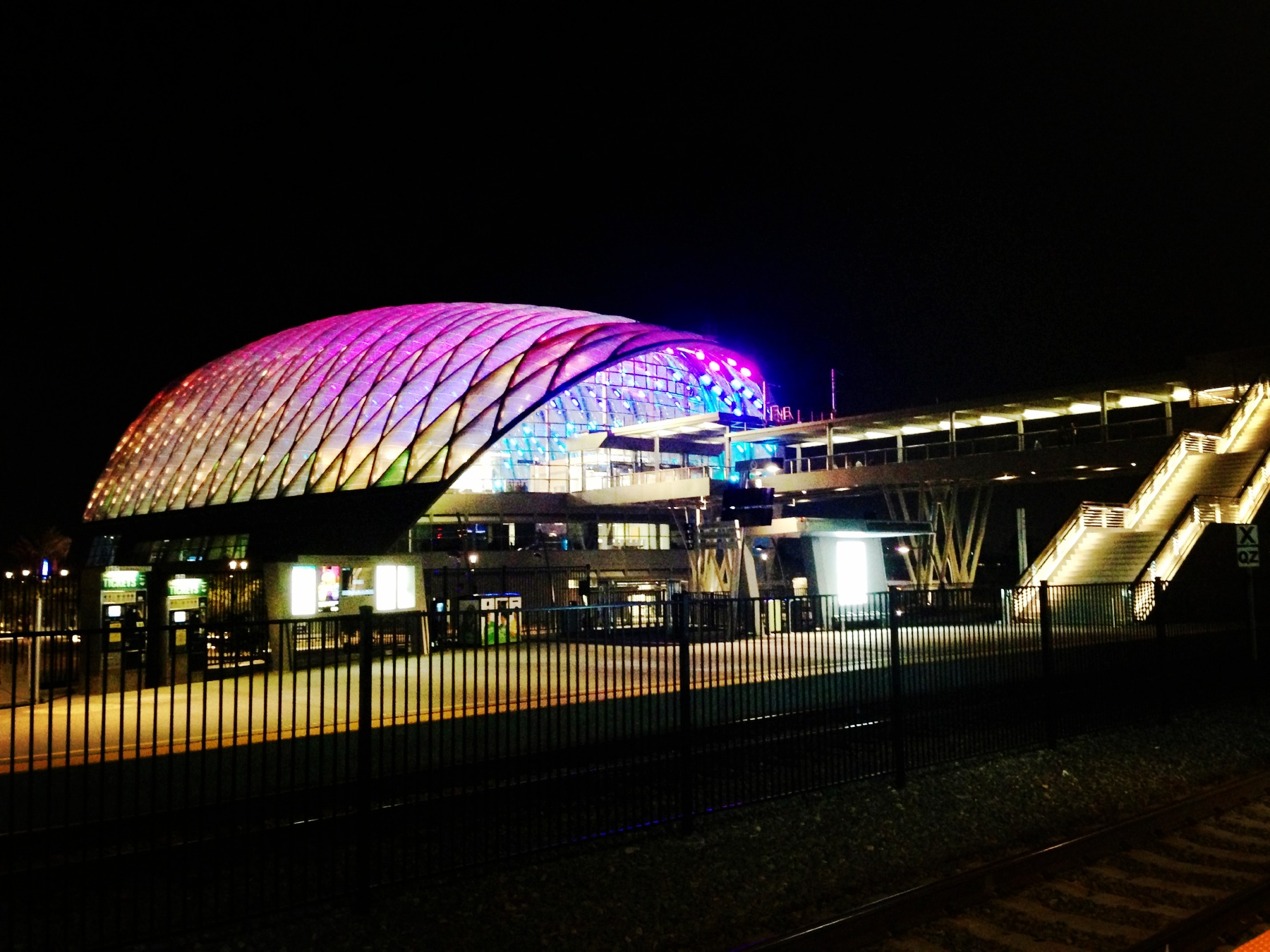
Station from the platforms at night

The tubular steel-framed 67,880-square-foot (6,306 m^{2}) building has a compound curved shell that is covered with a 200,000-square-foot (19,000 m^{2}) ethylene tetrafluoroethylene (ETFE) roof system. This allows diffuse sunlight to illuminate a major portion of the building's interior. At night, the structure can be illuminated in any color with the 1,354 energy-efficient lights glowing through the air-filled plastic pillows which make up the arched roof. The structure's entrance is a 120-foot-tall (37 m) glass wall and leads into a spacious lobby ticketing counter area. A plaza leads to the thirteen bus bays. The second floor has space for offices and two restaurants. The third level is a mezzanine with a small lobby and the concourse bridge for access to the stairs or elevators that take travelers down to the railroad tracks.

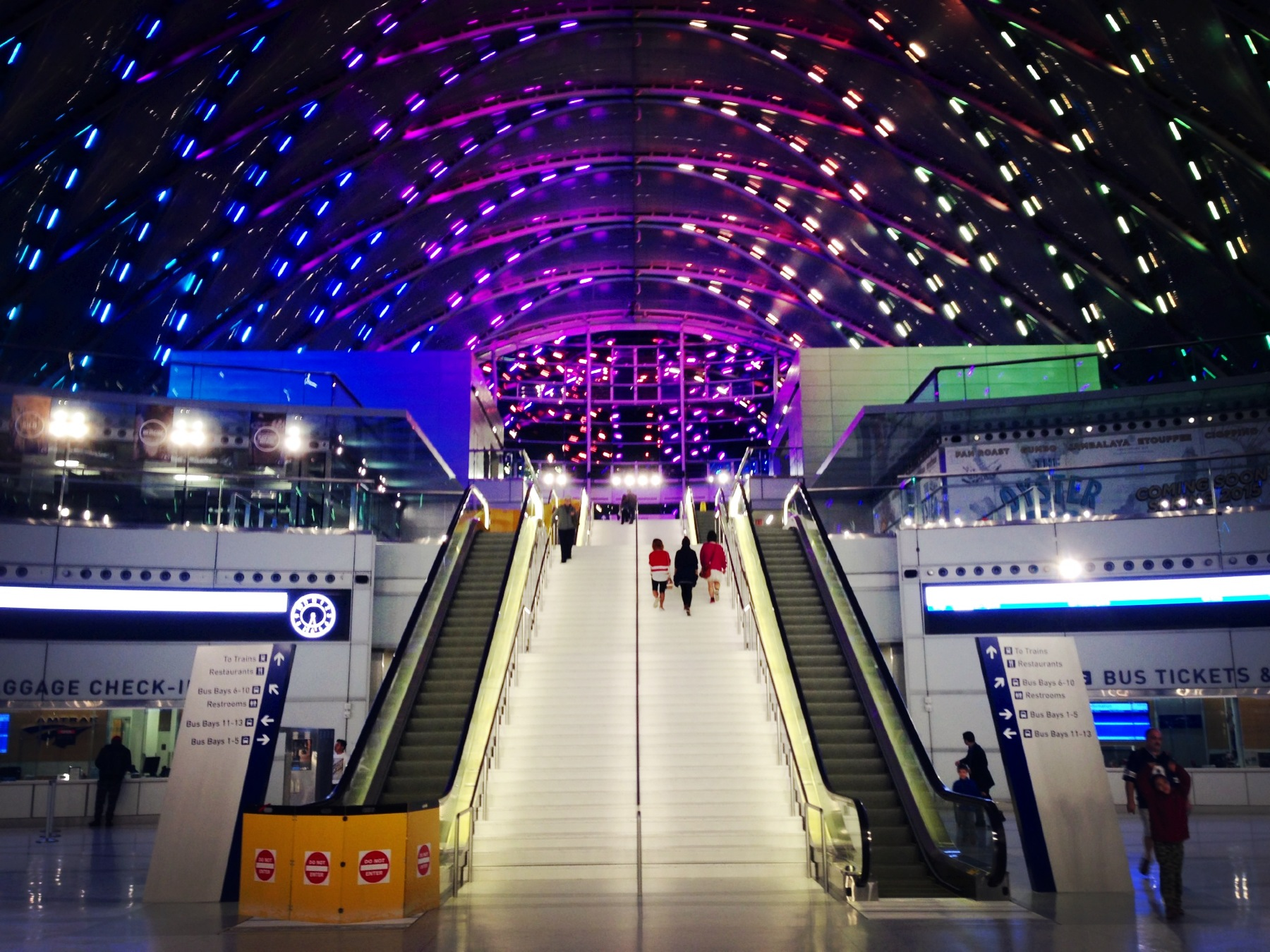
Interior of the Anaheim station at night

The building was certified LEED Platinum and was awarded the 2015 Public Works Project of the Year by the American Public Works Association. Recognizing excellence in the management and administration of public works projects, the cooperative achievements of the managing agency, contractor, and consultants were highlighted by the award. The building uses a combination of radiant floor and jet diffusers to cool or heat only a 12-to-15-foot (3.7 to 4.6 m)-high area above the floor. The ETFE foil "pillows" maintain a cool temperature in the unconditioned space at the high elevations of the curtain wall when used in conjunction with glass louvers at both ends that open to allow natural air flow when needed. Twenty percent of the building's power was designed to be generated by solar panels on the parking structures and recycled materials were used in the construction. The complex geometry of the diamond-shaped metal grid that forms the shell is supported by a structural steel frame. This required extensive planning and preparation using building information modeling.

Artist Mikyoung Kim was selected to complete the sole piece of public art slated for the complex. A dynamic holographic experience was integrated into the grand staircase of the main lobby. Different conditions of time and phenomena transform the atmospheric images.

=== Reception ===
The transit center has been praised for its aesthetics. It has been praised for acting as a civic landmark for the city of Anaheim (being described as perhaps acting as a tourist attraction itself) and for featuring a pleasant and grand interior space, which has been likened to stations from the peak of American rail transit (such as Grand Central Terminal and former Pennsylvania Station building). In 2014, hailing it as a "world class transportation gateway to Orange County, the American Institute of Architects described the station as, combining "the heritage and civic importance of the grand 19th century rail stations of the past with the size, scale and complexity of today's modern airport terminals." Its shape has also been described as reminiscent to airship hangars, driving comparisons to the historically notable structures also located in Orange County. The project received a 2014 American Institute of Architects Technology in Architectural Practice Building Information Modeling Award.

The station's physical layout has received criticism due to the lengthy route that users need to take to reach the train platforms and the physical distance between the station building and the platforms. Some commuters transferring between bus and train have called the layout "dysfunctional" for pedestrians. Additionally, the transit center's location in the middle of a vast area full of various parking lots has been criticized for being isolated.

== Operational costs and revenue sources ==
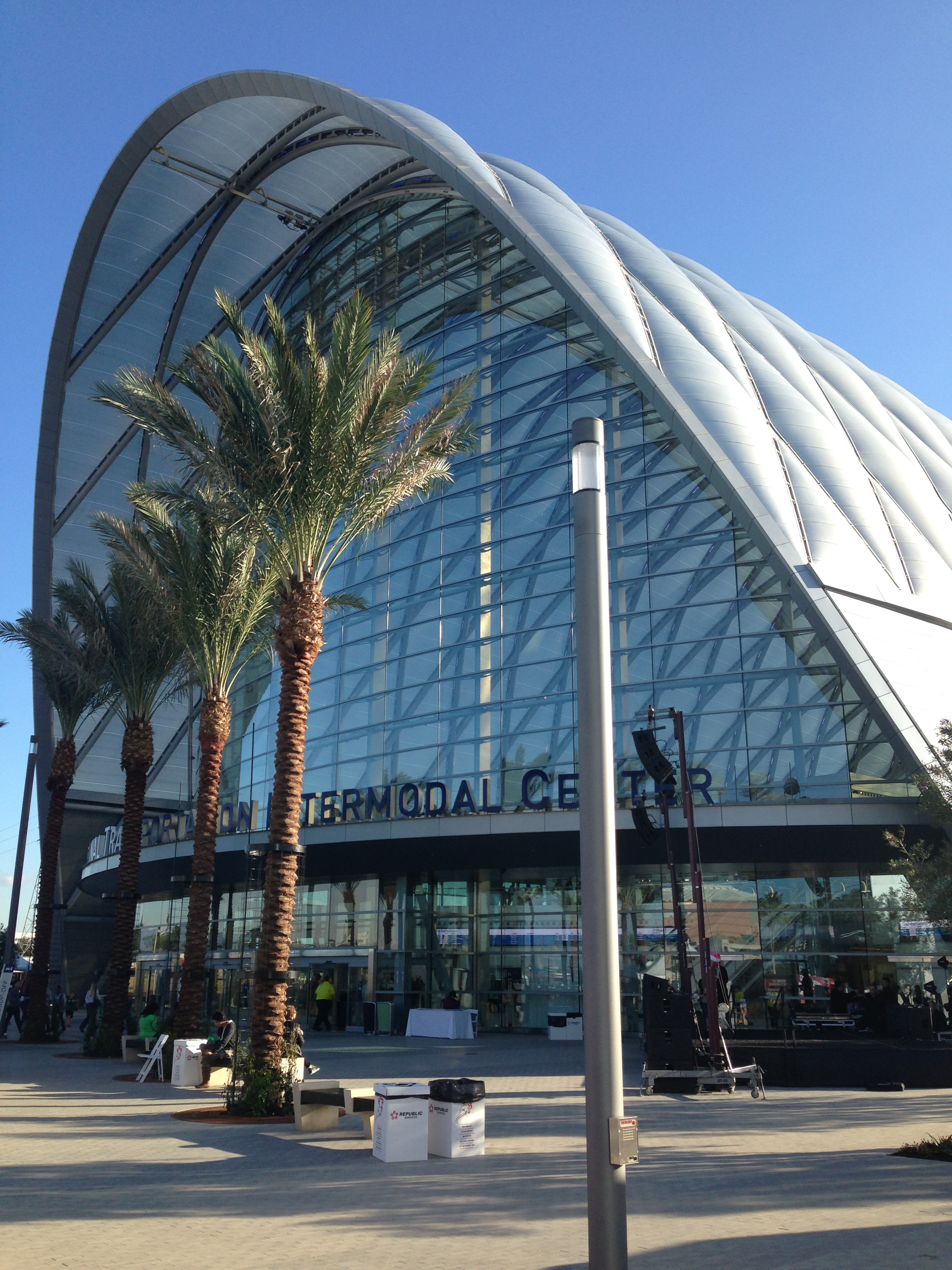
ARTIC front facade

The city of Anaheim is responsible for the ongoing operating and maintenance costs and planned for the facility to be self-funded. Potential revenue sources anticipated in the planning were advertising, a naming-rights sponsor, and leases from tenant business. During the first years, most of the funding has come from the 2 percent assessment from the resort area hotel guests collected by the Anaheim Tourism Improvement District. Some additional funds have come from Measure M2 which is a half-cent countywide sales tax that helps pay for transportation improvements. The city eventually began to obtain lease revenue from commercial tenants but has continued to manage costs at the depot and seek more revenue through events and filming.

Two 35-foot-tall (11 m) monument signs were approved that display static directions and center advertising for the transit hub. An 84-foot-tall (26 m) digital billboard facing State Route 57 had been proposed to generate about $800,000 annually in advertising revenue. At a November 2014 meeting, the City Council indefinitely postponed the electronic sign even though it would have been one of the primary funding sources for the $3.6-million cost to operate ARTIC during the first seven months of operation. A naming-rights partner has not been obtained, so city officials will continue with those efforts since this was also supposed to be one of the main funding sources for operation and maintenance of the station.

Anaheim had originally planned for the sales of naming rights to be a source of revenue.

== In popular culture ==
The station was featured in the second season finale of the HBO series True Detective.

In the second season of The Morning Show, the station was used as a mock of a train station for the show's Wuhan, China scene during the beginning of the COVID-19 pandemic due to its similar design.

== Ridership ==
In 2013, the last year before the new facility opened, the station averaged approximately 500 daily Metrolink boardings and 400 daily Amtrak boardings. There were roughly 224,500 annual Amtrak passengers (arrivals and departures) in 2013.

City officials had originally projected that, after the station was rebuilt as the ARTIC, daily ridership would eventually amount to more than 10,330 boardings, and predicted that initial ridership would see nearly 3,000 daily boardings. However, the project had been advertised as though 10,000 riders were expected on opening day. Initially, a typical weekday saw about 2,400 transit riders, increasing to 3,900 on days with concerts and/or sporting events at the nearby venues.

By 2019, 4,200 to 5,500 riders were passing through on any given day. Amtrak trains had 287,415 boardings and departures that year. In addition, Amtrak Thruway intercity bus services (which connect the station to/from eight cities) saw 950 passengers to/from ARTIC in 2019.

=== Amtrak ridership ===
In 2019, Amtrak handled 242,032 arrivals and departures at the station. All of these were coach and business class tickets (the Pacific Surfliner does not have a first class or sleeper class).

In 2019, the average trip to/from the station was 73 miles (117 km) in distance. 91.8% of all trips at the station were to/from stations less than 100 miles (160 km) from the station, 5.9% were to stations between 100 and 200 miles (320 km) away, and 2.2% were to stations more than 200 miles (320 km) away.

In 2019, the average Amtrak fare to/from the station cost $25.00, and the average yield per mile (revenue generated per passenger mile) on trips to/from the station was $0.347.

==== Annual Amtrak passenger traffic ====
Annual Amtrak passenger traffic (arrivals + departures)
Year	Passengers (in thousands)	Change
2013	214.5	--
2014	212.8	▼1.0%
2015	236.3	▲11.0%
2016	243.9	▲3.2%
2017	247.6	▲1.5%
2018	256.6	▲3.6%
2019	242.0	▼5.7%

==== Top station pairs by Amtrak ridership ====
The following is the top-ten stations which receive the most ridership to/from ARTIC out of the twenty-eight stations that the Pacific Surfliner connects ARTIC to/from.

Top station pairs by Amtrak ridership (as of 2019)
Rank	Station	City	Distance from ARTIC
1	Santa Fe Depot	San Diego, California	97 miles (156 km)
2	Union Station	Los Angeles, California	31 miles (50 km)
3	Old Town Transit Center	San Diego, California	94 miles (151 km)
4	Solana Beach station	Solana Beach, California	71 miles (114 km)
5	Oceanside Transit Center	Oceanside, California	56 miles (90 km)
6	Santa Barbara	Santa Barbara, California	135 miles (217 km)
7	San Juan Capistrano	San Juan Capistrano, California	27 miles (43 km)
8	Irvine Transportation Center	Irvine, California	14 miles (23 km)
9	San Luis Obispo	San Luis Obispo, California	253 miles (407 km)
10	Goleta	Goleta, California	143 miles (230 km)

==== Top station pairs by Amtrak revenue ====
The following is the top-ten stations which generate the most revenue from trips to/from ARTIC out of the twenty-eight stations that the Pacific Surfliner connects ARTIC to/from.

Top station pairs by Amtrak revenue (as of 2019)
Rank	Station	City	Distance from ARTIC
1	Santa Fe Depot	San Diego, California	97 miles (156 km)
2	Old Town Transit Center	San Diego, California	94 miles (151 km)
3	Union Station	Los Angeles, California	31 miles (50 km)
4	Solana Beach station	Solana Beach, California	71 miles (114 km)
5	Oceanside Transit Center	Oceanside, California	56 miles (90 km)
6	Santa Barbara	Santa Barbara, California	135 miles (217 km)
7	San Luis Obispo	San Luis Obispo, California	253 miles (407 km)
8	Goleta	Goleta, California	143 miles (230 km)
9	San Juan Capistrano	San Juan Capistrano, California	27 miles (43 km)
9	Ventura	Ventura, California	108 miles (174 km)

== Hours and frequency ==
Anaheim Regional Transportation Intermodal Center is served by 26 Amtrak Pacific Surfliner trains (13 in each direction) evenly spaced throughout the day.

Anaheim Regional Transportation Intermodal Center is served by 26 Metrolink Orange County Line trains (13 in each direction) each weekday, evenly spaced throughout the day. Weekend service consists of 4 trains (2 in each direction) on both Saturday and Sunday, running in each direction in the morning and evening.
