= Teamsters Local 1932 =

Labor union in California, US

Teamsters Local 1932 is a labor union based in San Bernardino, California, representing public sector employees throughout San Bernardino County. Teamsters Local 1932 is the largest union in the County of San Bernardino, representing 11,000 of the County's 25,000 employees. The union was founded by members of the independent San Bernardino Public Employees Association (SBPEA) after a vote to affiliate with the International Brotherhood of Teamsters in April 2015.

== History ==
=== Origin ===
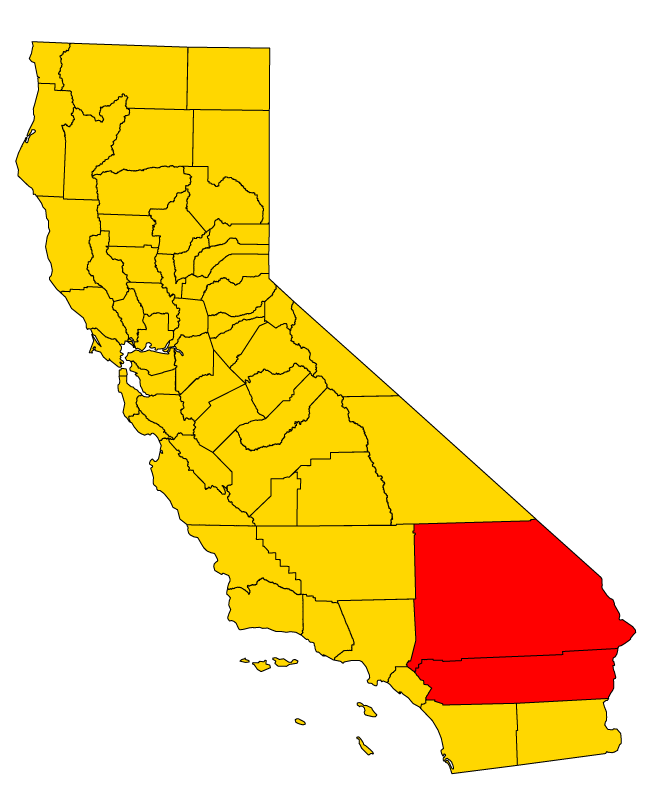
A map of the Inland Empire metropolitan area of California, which consists of the counties of Riverside and San Bernardino. Local 1932 is based in San Bernardino.

The San Bernardino Public Employees Association was founded in 1932, and prior to its demise represented employees at the County of San Bernardino, as well as employees from 18 cities in San Bernardino, Riverside and Los Angeles counties, and other public agencies in the region. Amid losses of hundreds of in members to Service Employees International Union Local 721 and a lawsuit by the union against its former general manager for missing funds and unauthorized expenditures, members of SBPEA voted to affiliate with the International Brotherhood of Teamsters in April 2015. SBPEA converted to Teamsters Local 1932, in honor of SBPEA's founding year.

=== 2015 – present ===
Local 1932 members were victims and survivors of the December 2, 2015 mass shooting in San Bernardino, California. Local 1932 was active in lobbying for victim access to grants to use for medical care in the aftermath of the attack.

In November 2016, 500 employees at the San Bernardino County Preschool Services Department joined Teamsters Local 1932.

Starting in November 2016, Teamsters Local 1932 began partnering with local businesses in the Riverside–San Bernardino–Ontario metropolitan area (known as the "Inland Empire") to provide members with discounts as a reward for shopping locally. As of January 2020, the program, called "Teamster Advantage", has grown to a network of over 500 local businesses.

In October 2018, the union hosted a job fair called "A Day Without a Temp" focused on raising awareness of the increase in temporary and contingent work across the Inland Empire, while providing union job opportunities to those attendance.

At the County of San Bernardino's "State of the County" event in February 2019, one hundred Local 1932 members passed out a University of California, Riverside report regarding poor job quality in the Inland Empire. The union's members from the County's Preschool Services Department hand-billed the 2020 "State of the County" event as part of the group's campaign for a new contract, raising concerns on working conditions and its effects on student learning conditions.

In September 2019, after ten months of negotiations, Local 1932 ratified a new contract with the County of San Bernardino, which the union says brought down healthcare costs for employees.

Under the leadership of Secretary-Treasurer Randy Korgan, a former warehouse worker, Local 1932 prioritizes organizing workers in the local logistics industry. The Inland Empire is home to a "central hub of the supply chain" with 80 percent of goods arriving at the Ports of Los Angeles and Long Beach eventually passing through the region.

=== Activity at San Bernardino International Airport ===
In April 2019, Teamsters Local 1932 was active in pushing for a Community Benefits Agreement, including job quality and air quality standards, at a development planned for San Bernardino International Airport. After a lengthy period of rumors surrounding the air cargo facility's tenant, San Bernardino International Airport Authority Executive Director Michael Burrows confirmed that Amazon would be operating at the site in May 2020. Amazon is the Inland Empire's largest private employer and its involvement in the project has led to pushback from local unions and community organizations because of the company's labor and environmental practices in the region. The project was the subject of a community picket line in front of an Amazon facility in San Bernardino on Cyber Monday 2019.

The Community Benefits Agreement push by Teamsters Local 1932 and community allies were supported by U.S. Senator Bernie Sanders and California Attorney General Xavier Becerra in December 2019. On February 21, 2020, Becerra joined Local 1932 Secretary-Treasurer Randy Korgan in a press conference announcing a lawsuit by the state of California against the San Bernardino International Airport Authority, the Federal Aviation Administration, and project developer Hillwood over a violation of the National Environmental Policy Act during the development of Eastgate.
