= OC Vibe =

Entertainment complex located in Anaheim, California, US

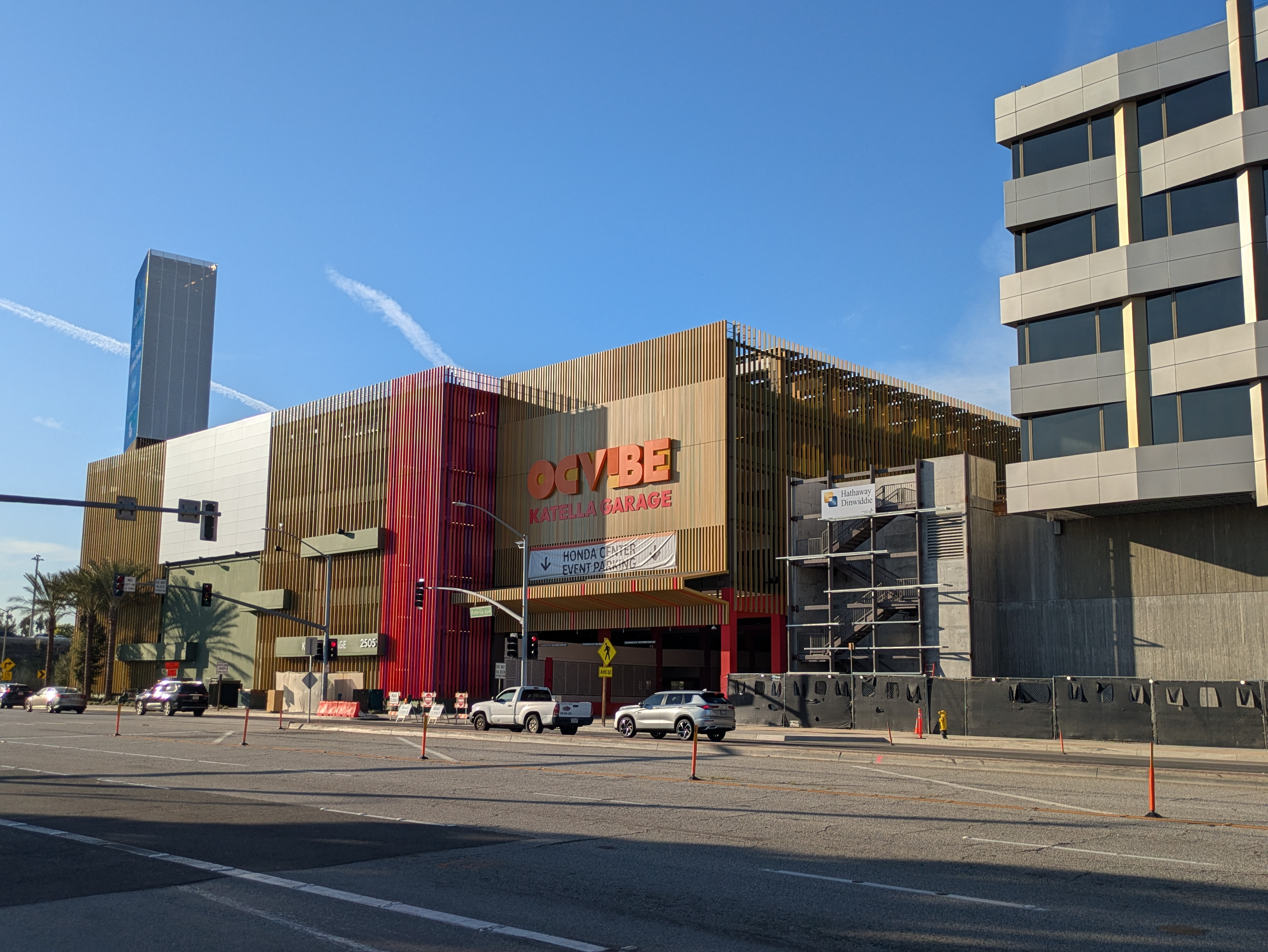
- OC Vibe's Katella Parking Garage in February 2026
- Interactive map of OC Vibe
- Other names: OCVIBE, OC V!BE
- Location: Platinum Triangle of Anaheim, California, United States
- Address: 2610 E Katella Ave, Anaheim, CA 92806
- Coordinates: 33°48′28.102″N 117°52′35.529″W
- Status: Under construction
- Groundbreaking: June 2023; 2 years ago
- Estimated completion: Early 2027 (Phase One); Mid-2030s (Phase Three)
- Opening: Late 2025-Late 2029
- Website: www.ocvibe.com

Companies
- Architect: Smith-Clementi
- Structural engineer: John A. Martin & Associates
- Contractor: Hathaway Dinwiddie Construction Company
- Developer: Fuscoe Engineering
- Owner: City of Anaheim
- Manager: The Mixx
- Planner: Hunsaker & Associates Irvine, Inc.

Technical details
- Cost: approximately US$4 billion
- Size: 100 acres

OC Vibe, stylized as OCVIBE and previously stylized as OCV!BE, is an entertainment complex currently under construction in the Platinum Triangle of Anaheim, California. It encompasses local landmarks Honda Center and the Anaheim Regional Transportation Intermodal Center, and is directly adjacent to Angel Stadium. The development is bordered by the 57 Freeway to the West and the Santa Ana River to the East.

OC Vibe is designed by Smith-Clementi Architecture firm. The estimated cost of the development is US$4 billion, with the majority of the development being privately funded by Henry Samueli, owner of the Anaheim Ducks, with upwards of $400 million of supplementary bonds being provided by the City of Anaheim.

== Timeline ==
OC Vibe was first envisioned in 2018, when the Samueli Foundation renewed their lease of the Ducks in the Honda Center, which granted the Samueli Foundation rights to a 115-acre site surrounding the Honda Center for the development of an entertainment district. The entertainment district, inspired by similar redevelopments such as L.A. Live, was a part of the major push the City of Anaheim to rapidly develop the area of the Platinum Triangle and spur economic growth.

Having floated the idea into the public sphere, the groundwork for the project first began when the Samueli Foundation bought 18 acres of city-owned parking lots that surrounded the Honda Center in mid-March 2019. The initial submittal of plans to the city by the Samueli Foundation was sent on June 23, 2020, and development approved on October 4, 2022 by Anaheim City Council. Construction began in the middle of 2023, with work starting on the parking garages of phase one.

Development on the project started to accelerate in 2025. In June of 2025, the management of the development was announced to be ran by The Mixx, a property management group underneath the JLL real estate services company. The first aspects of the development, two parking garages named after Cerritos and Katella avenues, opened up on October 15, 2025, just before the start of the 2025–26 Anaheim Ducks season.

Phase	Phase description	Scheduled opening	Status
Phase I	Opening of two new multi-story parking garages, the Katella Commons, five restaurants, a 5,700-person amphitheater, and Urban Park.	Early 2027	Under construction
Phase II	Revival of the Golden Bear nightclub, alongside opening of a 3,000-capacity music hall, a hotel, two parks, and the creation of a pedestrian bridge from the ARTIC to the Honda Center.	Late 2028	Planning stages
Phase III	Opening of apartments, a second hotel, outdoor greenery space, and a third parking structure.	Late 2029-2030s	Planning stages

=== Explored expansion ===
==== Angel Stadium ====
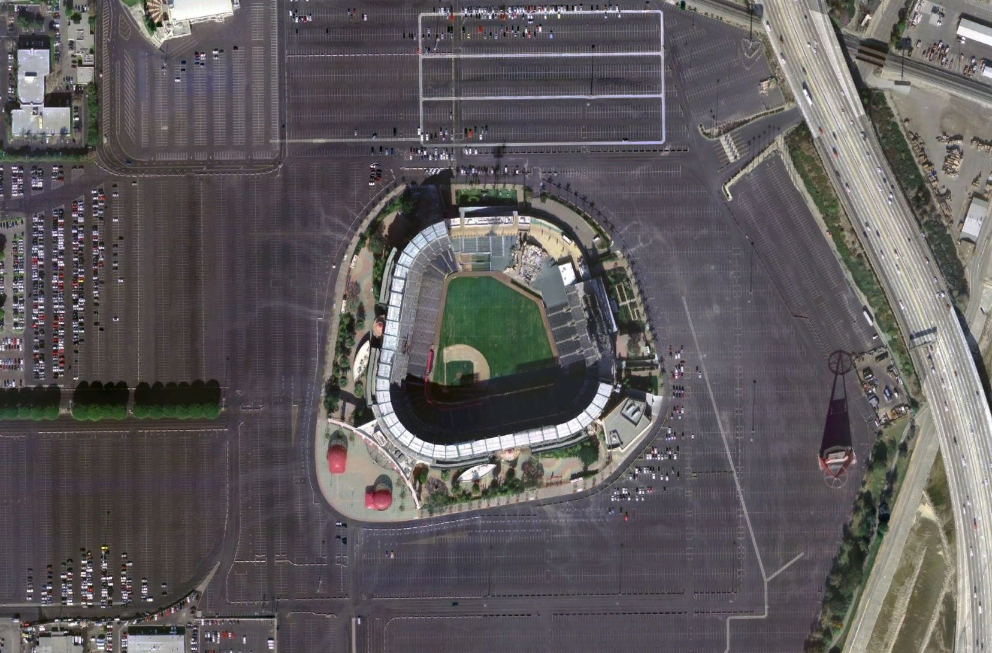
Aerial view of the parking lots surrounding Angel Stadium, which was posed for development before the land deal between Arte Moreno and the City of Anaheim fell through.

When first proposed, the area surrounding Angel Stadium was a proposed area for future development in conjunction with the OC Vibe project. The proposal would've seen the City of Anaheim sell Angel Stadium and the surrounding parking lots to Los Angeles Angels owner Arte Moreno for $325 million, who would in turn have created mixed-use development around the area. However, following a corruption lawsuit that found the former mayor of Anaheim Harry Sidhu guilty of conspiring with Arte Moreno to give Moreno a more favorable cost for the land in return for a million dollars' worth of campaign funds, the land deal fell through, and the proposed development was dropped from consideration by the City of Anaheim.

==== OC Riverwalk ====
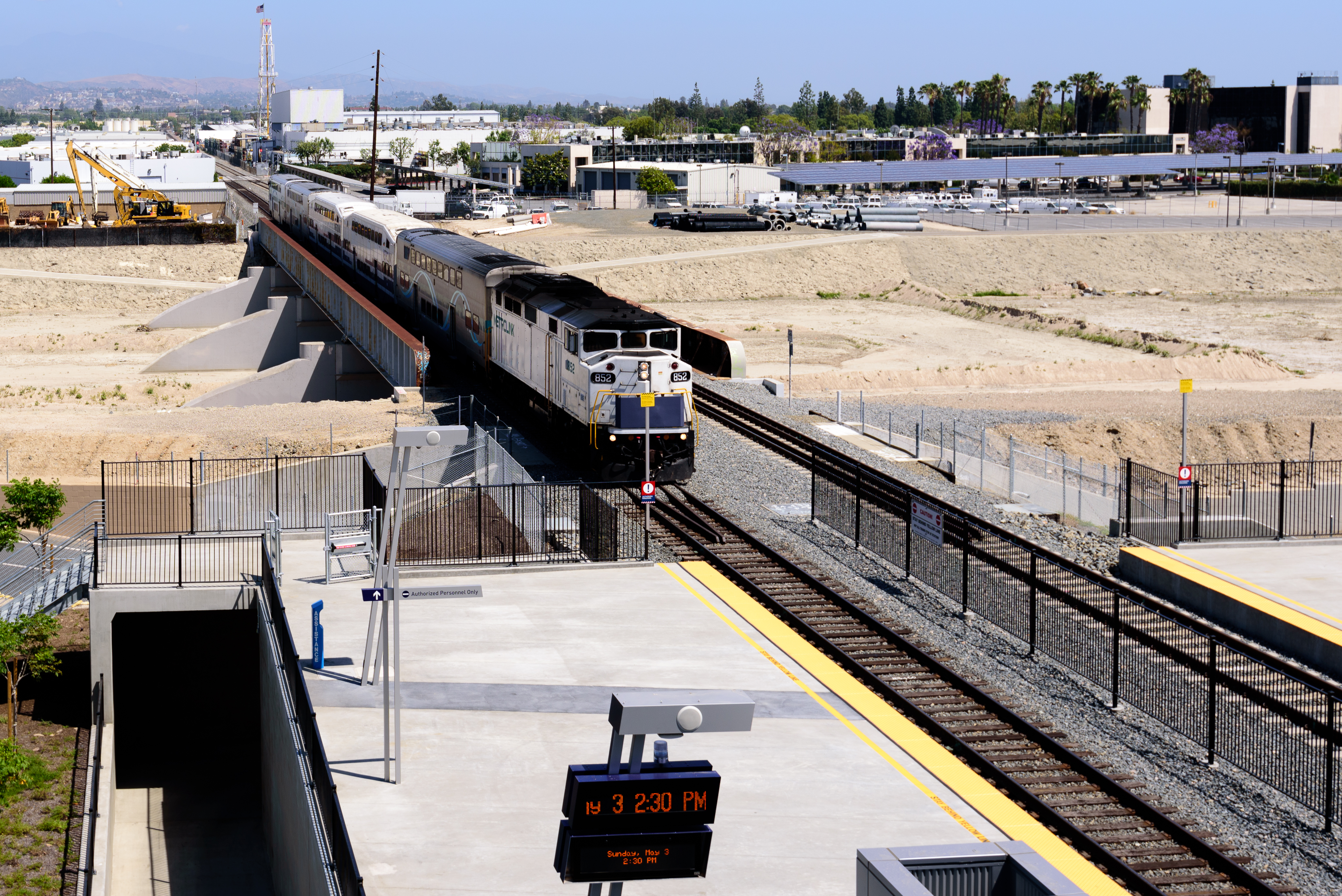
The portion of the Santa Ana River that passes nearby the ARTIC in May 2015, displaying the lack of water flow typical for most of the year.

The City of Anaheim is currently in the early planning stages of further development of the area of OC Vibe that borders the Santa Ana River, which the city's name of Anaheim derives its name. In its current state, the portion of the Santa Ana River set for development is typically dry most of the year, only flowing when runoff water from winter rains is sufficient to allow for consistent flow. When constructed, the OC Riverwalk, a project expected to cost over $200 million, will allow for year-round water flow via inflatable dams, alongside further development of the Santa Ana River Trail with the construction of two new pedestrian bridges and creation of further river facilities. The City of Anaheim has been given a $5 million grant from the United States Department of Transportation to help aid in the development.

== Features ==
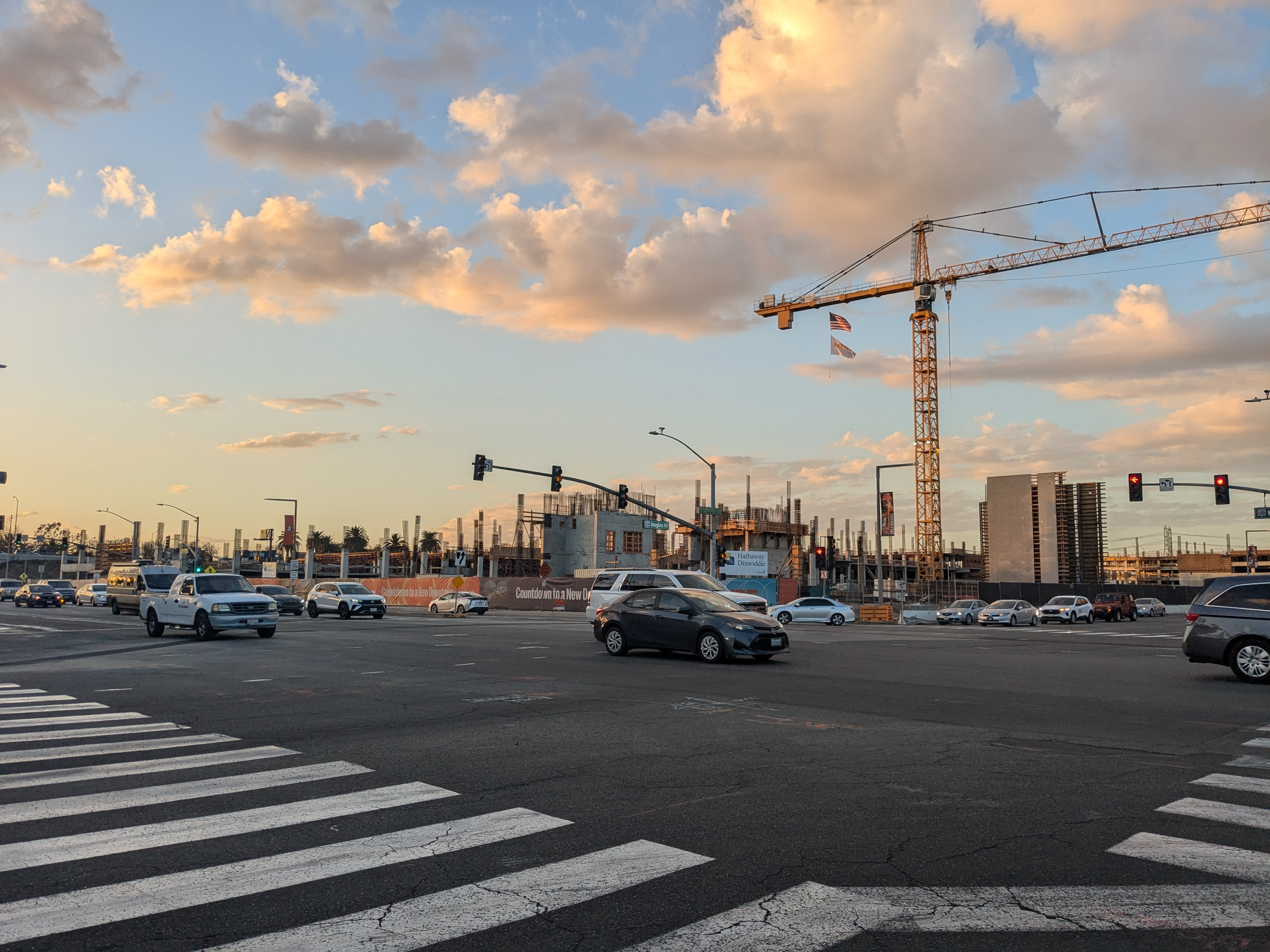
OC Vibe during early construction in November 2024.

Once fully completed, OC Vibe will encompass around 100 acres of the Platinum Triangle district of Anaheim, with twenty acres of land being dedicated to four parks, two hotels, an amphitheater, a music hall, multiple restaurants alongside the opening of a market hall named Katella Commons, new apartments and office spaces, and three parking garages.

=== Honda Center ===
The Honda Center, opened in 1993, will have a major $1.1 billion renovation that would be complete by 2027, in line with the second phase of the OC Vibe development and one year before the 2028 Summer Olympics. The renovations will create a new entrance, improve suite options, open a new club, and an overall modernization of the aesthetics inside the arena. The entirety of the renovation will be fully funded by the Samueli Foundation. Renovations will start in the Spring of 2026, following the end of the Anaheim Ducks' 2025-26 season.

=== Anaheim Regional Transportation Intermodal Center ===
The Anaheim Regional Transportation Intermodal Center, typically shortened to ARTIC, opened in 2014 and will undergo major renovations to massively improve public transit access for the OC Vibe development and the surrounding areas. The two restaurant spaces in the station will be filled, and the two main parking lots being transformed into an outdoor park and a parking garage. An elevated pedestrian bridge will be built during phase two of OC Vibe construction to directly connect the transportation hub to the Honda Center, which the US Department of Transportation has granted part of a $5 million grant to Anaheim to aid in its construction. A fourth rail line will also be constructed to receive future California High Speed Rail trains. Additionally, proposals to create a gondola system to connect the ARTIC to the Anaheim Convention Center and nearby Disneyland, with the city having had informal discussions with companies to explore the plausibility of the proposal.
