= I Street =

I Street or "I" Street is the ninth of a sequence of alphabetical streets in many cities.

It may refer to:

- I Street (Washington, D.C.)
- I Street Bridge, Sacramento, California
- Sacramento Valley Station, on I Street in Sacramento, California, known also as I Street Station
- Old I Street in Sacramento, was the Old Sacramento Chinatown.
