= Hayward station (Amtrak) =

Train station in Hayward, California

Hayward, CA
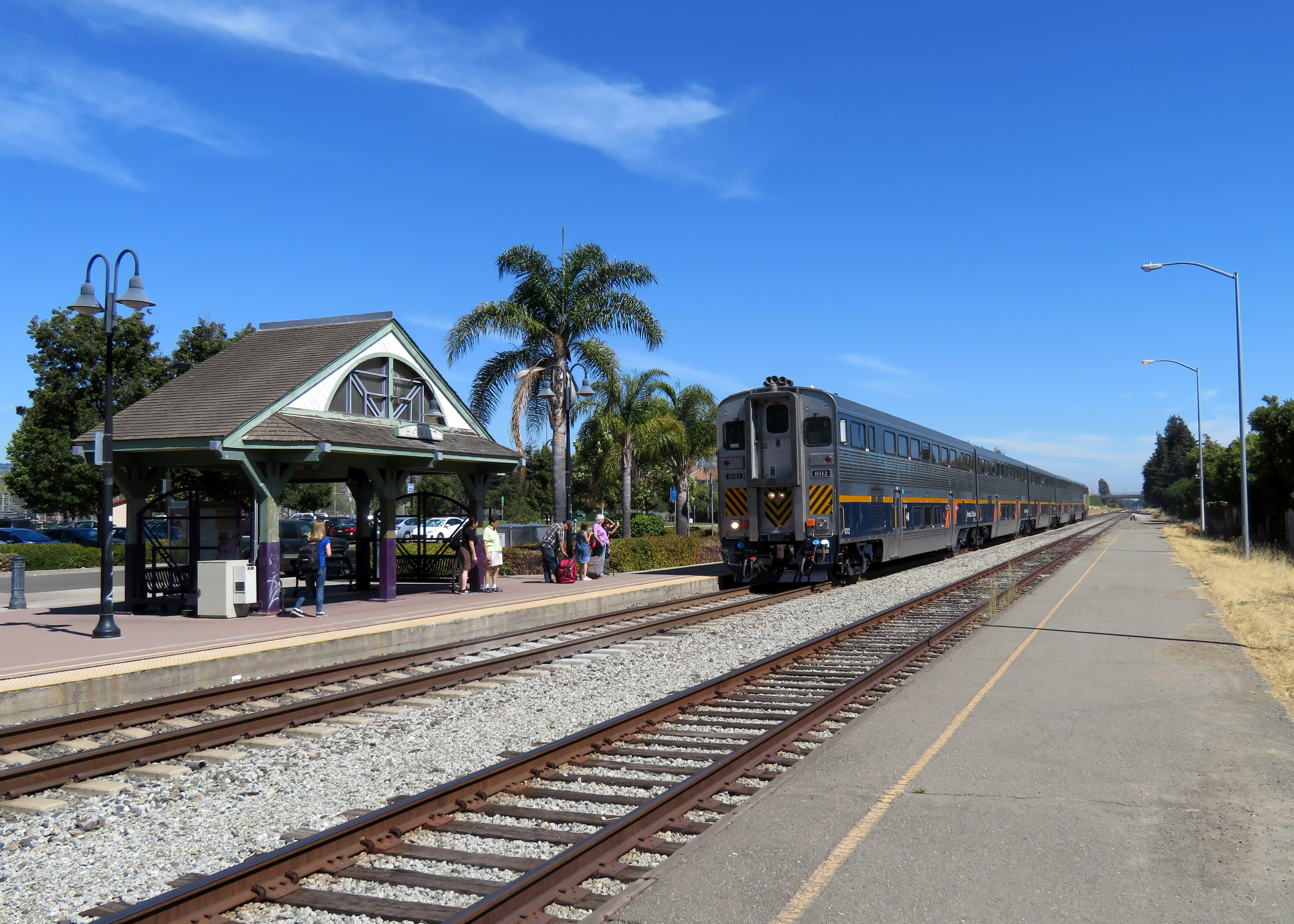
- Capitol Corridor train at Hayward station in 2018

General information
- Location: 22555 Meekland Avenue; Hayward, California; United States
- Coordinates: 37.6660°N 122.0993°W
- Owner: City of Hayward (shelter and parking); Union Pacific (platforms and tracks)
- Line: UP Niles Subdivision
- Platforms: 2 side platforms
- Tracks: 2
- Connections: AC Transit: 34, 56, 93

Construction
- Parking: 50 spaces
- Cycle facilities: Yes
- Accessible: Yes

Other information
- Station code: Amtrak: HAY

History
- Opened: May 29, 1997

Passengers
- FY 2025: 36,948 (Amtrak)

Services
Preceding station	Amtrak	Following station
Fremont toward San Jose	Capitol Corridor	Oakland Coliseum toward Auburn
Coast Starlight does not stop here
Location

Hayward station is an Amtrak intercity train station in Hayward, California, United States. It is served by seven daily round trips of the Capitol Corridor route. The station has two side platforms serving the main track and a passing siding; most trains use the platform on the main track.

Hayward station opened as an infill station on May 29, 1997; the town had previously seen railroad service from 1865 to 1941.

== History ==
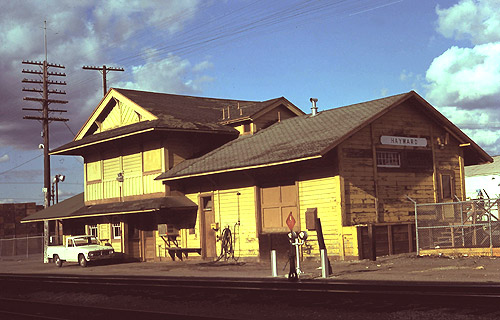
The abandoned 1885-built station in 1975

Railroad service in Haywards (later Hayward) began with the San Francisco and Alameda Railroad in August 1865. The terminal station was located at Watkins Street and D Street in downtown Haywards. It was destroyed in the 1868 Hayward earthquake, which bankrupted the railroad. The line was taken over in 1869 by the Central Pacific Railroad (CP). The CP built its own line (part of the First transcontinental railroad) and station slightly to the west, and abandoned the original line south of San Leandro in 1873.

Transcontinental service was shifted from the CP to a northern route on the California Pacific Railroad in 1879. The Southern Pacific Railroad (SP) leased the CP in 1885 and constructed a two-story wood station of standard design at Hayward. Long-distance service to the south was switched to the Coast Line around 1909, but local passenger service to Hayward continued until 1941. Freight service continued on the line, and the station remained intact until it was destroyed by a 1982 fire.

Amtrak Capitols (later Capitol Corridor) service between Sacramento and San Jose began in 1991; it ran through Hayward without stopping. After the success of other infill stations on the line, a station at Hayward was opened on May 29, 1997. A station shelter was constructed in the Arts and Crafts style. A siding track with a rarely-used second platform was added around 2006. Reconstruction of both platforms for accessibility took place in 2022–2024 at a cost of $5.6 million.

A 2016-released Vision Plan called for Capitol Corridor trains to be rerouted over the Coast Subdivision, which is used by less freight service. Hayward station would be closed under that plan.

== Bus connections ==
The station is served by three AC Transit local bus routes: route 34 runs adjacent to the station on Meekland Avenue, while routes 56 and 93 run on A Street. All three routes run to the larger bus terminal at Hayward BART station.
