= Capitol Corridor =

Amtrak service between San Jose and Auburn, California

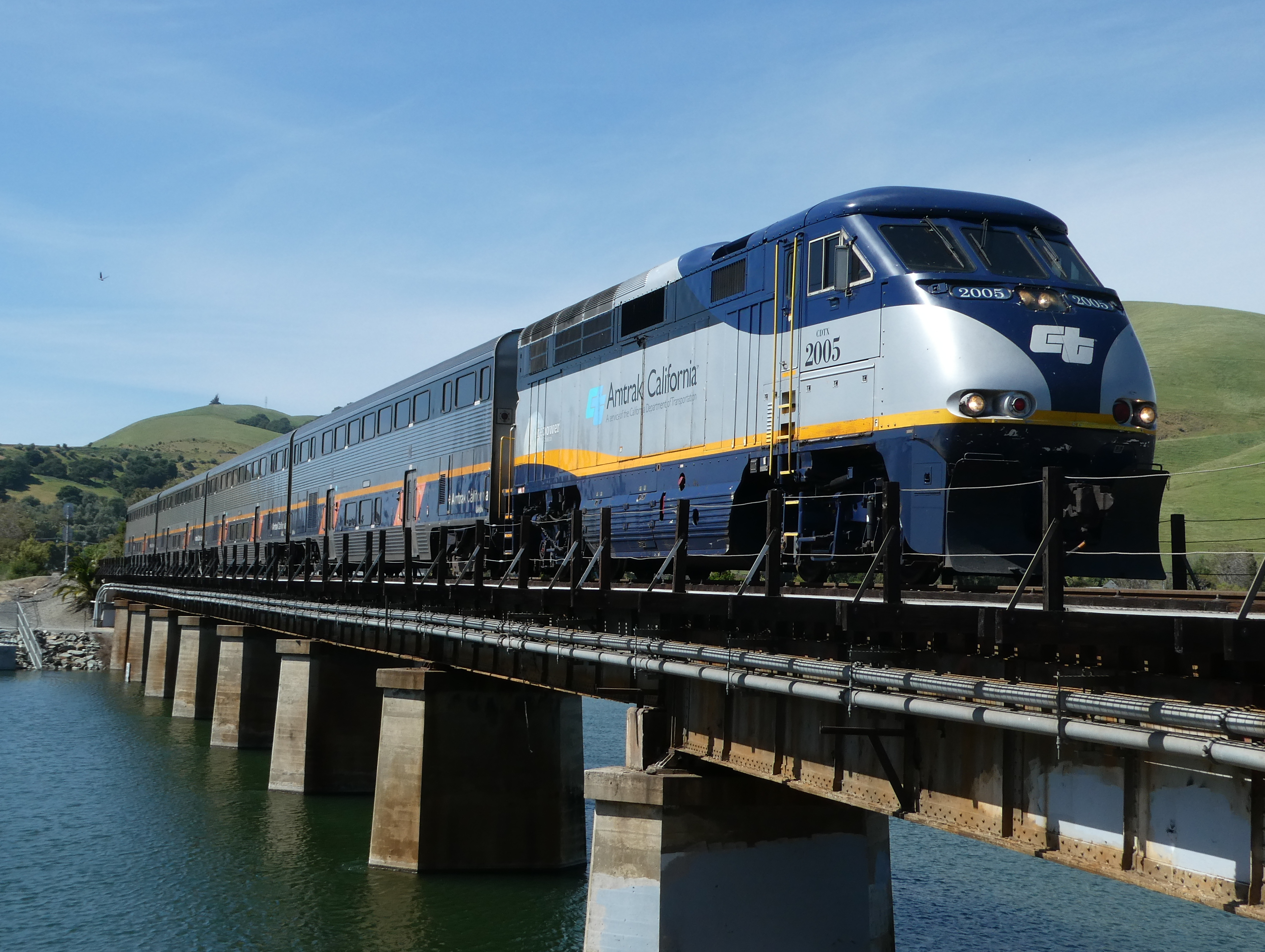
- A Capitol Corridor train in Fremont, California, in 2024

Overview
- Service type: Inter-city rail, commuter rail
- Locale: Northern California
- First service: December 12, 1991
- Current operators: Capitol Corridor Joint Powers Authority, in partnership with Amtrak, BART, Caltrans and Transit Services America
- Annual ridership: 1,138,753 (FY 25) ▲10.3% (Note: Amtrak's Fiscal Year (FY) runs from October 1 of the prior year to September 30 of the named year.)
- Website: capitolcorridor.org

Route
- Termini: Auburn; San Jose
- Stops: 17
- Distance travelled: 168 miles (270 km)
- Average journey time: 3 1/2 hours (Auburn-San Jose) 3 hours (Sacramento-San Jose) 2 hours (Sacramento-Oakland)
- Service frequency: 14 round trips (weekdays); 11 round trips (weekends)
- Train number: 520–551, 720–751

On-board services
- Class: Coach Class
- Disabled access: Train lower level, all stations
- Catering facilities: Café
- Baggage facilities: Overhead bins, luggage racks

Technical
- Rolling stock: California Car; EMD F59PHI; Siemens Charger
- Track gauge: 4 ft 8 1/2 in (1,435 mm) standard gauge
- Track owners: UP, JPBX
Route map
Capitol Corridor highlighted in black

The Capitol Corridor is a 168-mile (270 km) passenger train route in Northern California operated by Amtrak between San Jose, in the Bay Area, and Auburn, in the Sierra Foothills via the Sacramento Valley. The route is named after the two points most trains operate between, San Jose (which was the first state capital of California) and Sacramento (the current capital, with the State Capitol building). The route runs roughly parallel to I-880 and I-80. A single daily round trip runs between San Jose and Auburn, in the foothills of the Sierra Nevada. Capitol Corridor trains started in 1991.

Like all regional trains in California, the Capitol Corridor is operated by a joint powers authority. The Capitol Corridor Joint Powers Authority (CCJPA) is governed by a board that includes two elected representatives from each of eight counties the train travels through. The CCJPA contracts with the San Francisco Bay Area Rapid Transit District to provide day-to-day management of the service, Amtrak to operate the trains, and Transit Services America to maintain the rolling stock (locomotives and passenger cars). Caltrans provides the funding to operate the service and also owns the rolling stock.

== History ==
=== Former service ===
The First transcontinental railroad was completed to Oakland from the south in 1869. Following the completion of the California Pacific Railroad in 1879, most long-distance service of the Southern Pacific (SP) reached Oakland from the north. Long-distance service from the south ran to San Francisco via the Peninsula; some trains had Oakland sections. The Western Pacific Railroad (completed to Oakland in 1910) and Santa Fe Railroad (completed to Oakland in 1903 over the former California and Nevada Railroad track) ran primarily long-distance service with limited local stops. Commuter service around Oakland was largely provided by the electric interurban trains of the SP-owned East Bay Electric Lines (1911–1941) and Key System (1901–1958).

By the end of the 1930s, the SP operated five daily local round trips plus a number of long-distance trains between Oakland and Sacramento. The Oakland Lark and an unnamed local train (an Oakland connection for the Coast Daylight) provided local service between Oakland and San Jose on the Coast Line. The inland Niles Subdivision was served by a daily Oakland–Tracy local and a commute-timed Oakland–San Jose local (which ran via Centerville and part of the Coast Line on the northbound trip and Milpitas southbound).

The increasing prevalence of auto ownership and improvements in local roads meant that numerous commuters began to drive their own vehicles rather than take the train. The decline in ridership resulted in SP discontinuing the Oakland–San Jose trip on the Niles Subdivision on September 29, 1940, followed by ending the Oakland–Tracy trip in 1941. The two Oakland–San Jose trips on the Coast Line were discontinued on May 1, 1960. The last local service between Oakland and Sacramento was the Senator, discontinued by the SP on May 31, 1962 (though long-distance service continued).

=== Capitols ===
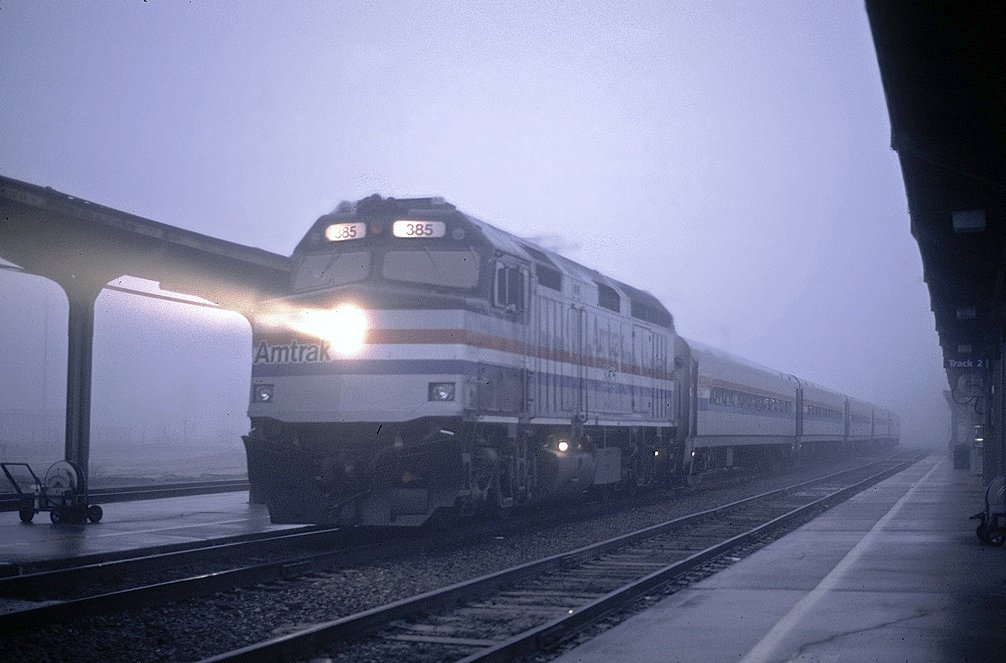
A Capitols train at Sacramento in 1995

From the 1970s to the beginning of the 1990s, three Amtrak intercity trains operated in the Bay Area: the long-distance California Zephyr (Oakland/Emeryville–Chicago) and Coast Starlight (Los Angeles–Seattle), and the regional San Joaquins (Bakersfield–Oakland).

Of the three lines, only the Coast Starlight ran between San Jose and Sacramento—once a day in each direction, and at inconvenient times (southbound early in the morning, northbound in the evening). In 1977, Amtrak approved an additional Oakland–Sacramento round trip, the Sacramentan; the service was never operated.

In 1990, California voters passed two ballot propositions providing $105 million (equivalent to $259 million in 2025) to expand service along the route. The new service, named Capitols, debuted on December 12, 1991, with three daily round trips between San Jose and Sacramento. Of these, a single round trip continued to Roseville, an eastern Sacramento suburb.

One of the ballot propositions, Proposition 116, provided the name Capitol Corridor—so named because it links the location of California's first state capital, San Jose, with the current capital, Sacramento. State Capitol buildings were operated in each city. The service was known as the Capitols until April 29, 2001, when Amtrak renamed it the Capitol Corridor.

=== Service changes ===
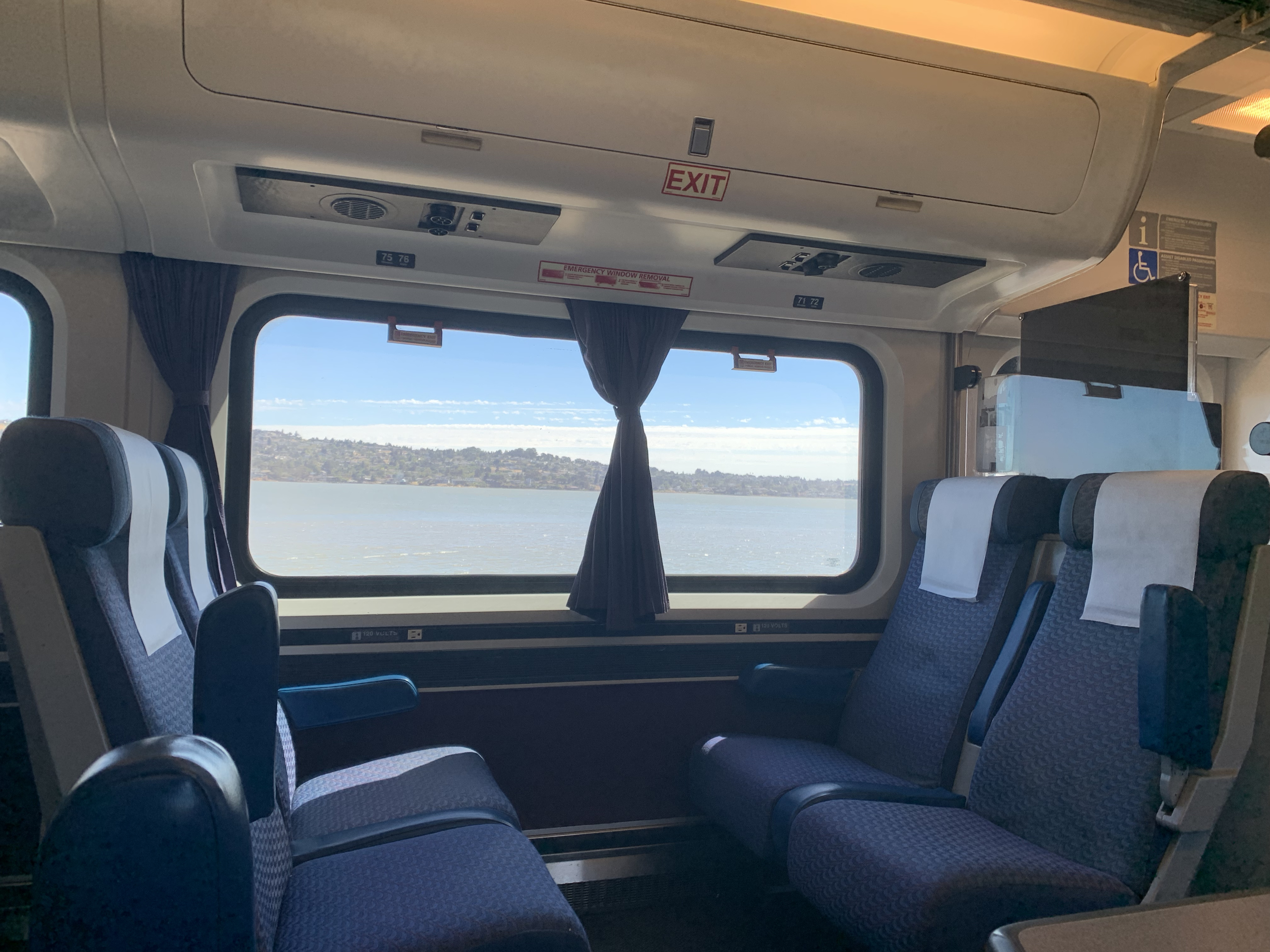
Interior of the Capitol Corridor train, 2022

The Capitols originally ran via the Coast Line from Elmhurst to Santa Clara, with no stops between Oakland and San Jose. In 1992, after the completion of track and signal work, the Capitols were rerouted onto the Niles Subdivision further inland between Elmhurst and Newark. The new route allowed the addition of infill stations at Fremont in 1993 and Hayward in 1997. The Oakland 16th Street station, which had been damaged by the 1989 Loma Prieta earthquake, was closed in 1994. It was replaced by new stations at Emeryville in 1993 and Oakland-Jack London Square in 1995. Additional infill stations were added at Santa Clara–Great America in 1993, Oakland Coliseum (with a close connection to BART) in 2005, the Caltrain station in Santa Clara-University in 2012, and Fairfield–Vacaville in 2017.

After financial concerns in the mid-1990s, service was gradually increased from the original three daily round trips. A fourth round trip was added in April 1996, a fifth in November 1998, and a sixth in February 1999. One daily round trip was extended east to Colfax via Rocklin and Auburn on January 26, 1998. The trip was cut back to Auburn (with the Rocklin stop retained) on February 27, 2000.

Installation of positive train control along the route was completed by November 2018. In response to low ridership as a result of the COVID-19 pandemic, the Capitol Corridor schedule was reduced to five daily trips on March 21, 2020, with discontinued Auburn service and many trips ending in Oakland. Three runs were added back on June 1 and Auburn service restored, but the route wasn't back to full service until December 8th, 2025.

=== Proposed expansion ===
==== Infill stations ====
Infill stations have been proposed along the route at Hercules, Benicia, and Dixon.

==== Vision Plan and Realignment ====
The Capitol Corridor Vision Implementation Plan is a long-range outline of possible improvements to the service; several realignments along existing and new right-of-ways were considered and studied. Near-term suggested improvements include double tracking between San Jose and a realignment to the Coast Subdivision, and a new station at the Ardenwood Park & Ride, followed by track improvements between Emeryville and Richmond. Later goals include tunneling under Jack London Square to eliminate the street-running section there, rerouting freight traffic over another right-of-way between Sacramento and Martinez, and eventual electrification of the line.

The 2018 Senate Bill 1 allocated $93 million in funds for the Capitol Corridor, partially for planning the realignment to the Coast Subdivision. As of June 2020, the Draft Environmental Impact Report for the realignment (branded as South Bay Connect) is expected to be completed at the end of 2020, followed by the Final Environmental Impact Report a year later. Design is to take place in 2022–23, with construction beginning in 2024. The project is to have a single new station at the Ardenwood Park & Ride in Fremont; stations at Hayward (at SR 92) and Newark Junction were considered but rejected.

==== Extensions ====
Two daily Capitol Corridor round trips, along with some Caltrain service, were planned to be extended to Salinas as part of the Monterey County Rail Extension. Initial service will have intermediate stops at existing Caltrain stations at Tamien, Morgan Hill, and Gilroy; future phases will add new stations at Castroville and Pajaro/Watsonville.

A third track between Sacramento and Roseville is planned to start construction in 2021, which would allow an initial increase from one round trip per day to three, with plans for up to ten. Extension east to Reno, Nevada was deemed unlikely in the Vision Implementation Plan due to heavy freight traffic over Donner Pass and lack of funding, though plans for such an expansion were studied in 2022 with 83% of respondents indicating they would use the service if more frequent passenger rail were provided between Sacramento and Reno.

Extending service to downtown San Francisco by crossing the bay is being considered as part of a proposed second Transbay Tube. A study of a joint project providing a second crossing for BART began in 2019. San Francisco has not had direct intercity rail service since 1971.

== Frequency and ridership ==
Capitol Corridor route map

During fiscal year 2017 the Capitol Corridor service carried 1,607,277 passengers, a 2.9% increase over FY2016. Revenue in FY2017 was $33,970,000, a 5.3% increase over FY2016, with a 57% farebox recovery ratio. It is the fourth busiest Amtrak route by ridership, surpassed only by the Northeast Regional, Acela Express, and Pacific Surfliner. In large part due to the route's success, as of 2017, Sacramento is the busiest station on the route, the seventh busiest in the Amtrak system and the second busiest in California.

The Capitol Corridor is used by commuters between the Sacramento area and the Bay Area as an alternative to driving on congested Interstate 80. Monthly passes and discounted trip tickets are available. Many politicians, lobbyists, and aides live in the Bay Area and commute to their jobs in Sacramento, including those connecting to the train via Amtrak Thruway from San Francisco, while workers in the Oakland, San Francisco, and Silicon Valley employment centers take the Capitol Corridor trains from their less expensive homes in Solano County and the Sacramento metropolitan area.

Starting on August 28, 2006, the Capitol Corridor had 16 weekday trains each way between Oakland and Sacramento, up from twelve in 2005 and three in 1992. (Seven of the sixteen ran to/from San Jose.) According to its management, ridership on the Capitol Corridor trains tripled between 1998 and 2005. On August 13, 2012, the Capitol Corridor dropped from 16 to 15 weekday round trips between Oakland and Sacramento; one round trip was discontinued due to high fuel costs, low ridership, and a new ability to store an extra train overnight in a Sacramento railyard. As of December 8th, 2025, the Capitol Corridor has resumed full service after running a reduced number of trains since the COVID-19 pandemic and makes a total of 15 weekday round trips.

As of December 2025, trains run as follows:

- Auburn – San Jose: 1 round trip daily
- Sacramento – San Jose: 6 round trips daily
- Sacramento – Oakland Jack London Square: 8 round trips on weekdays, 4 round trips on weekends

== Stations and connections ==
All stations are located in the U.S. state of California.

Station	Connections
Auburn	Amtrak Thruway: 20 (Sacramento–Reno); Auburn Transit, Gold Country Stage, Placer County Transit
Rocklin	Amtrak Thruway: 20 (Sacramento–Reno)
Roseville	Amtrak: California Zephyr; Amtrak Thruway: 20 (Sacramento–Reno)
Sacramento	Amtrak: California Zephyr, Coast Starlight, Gold Runner; Amtrak Thruway: 3 (Redding–Stockton), 20 (Reno), 20C (South Lake Tahoe); SacRT light rail: Gold; El Dorado Transit, Sacramento RT
Davis	Amtrak: California Zephyr, Coast Starlight; Amtrak Thruway: 3 (Redding–Sacramento–Stockton); Unitrans
Fairfield–Vacaville	FAST
Suisun–Fairfield	Delta Breeze, FAST, VINE, SolTrans; Greyhound Lines
Martinez	Amtrak: California Zephyr, Coast Starlight, Gold Runner; Amtrak Thruway: 7 (Napa–Santa Rosa–Arcata); County Connection, Tri Delta Transit, WestCAT
Richmond	Amtrak: California Zephyr, Gold Runner; BART: Orange Line, Red Line; AC Transit; FlixBus
Berkeley	AC Transit
Emeryville	Amtrak: California Zephyr, Coast Starlight, Gold Runner; Amtrak Thruway: 99 (San Francisco); AC Transit, Emery Go-Round
Oakland	Amtrak: Coast Starlight, Gold Runner; Amtrak Thruway: 17 (San Jose–San Luis Obispo–Santa Barbara); AC Transit
Oakland Coliseum	BART: Green Line, Orange Line, Oakland Airport Connector; AC Transit
Hayward	AC Transit
Fremont	Altamont Corridor Express; AC Transit
Santa Clara–Great America	Altamont Corridor Express; VTA light rail: Green Line, Orange Line (at Lick Mill); VTA
Santa Clara–University	Altamont Corridor Express; Caltrain: Local, Limited, Weekend Local; VTA
San Jose	Amtrak: Coast Starlight; Altamont Corridor Express; Caltrain: Express, Local, Limited, Weekend Local, South County Connector; Amtrak Thruway: 6 (Stockton–Santa Cruz), 17 (Oakland–San Luis Obispo–Santa Barbara), 21 (San Luis Obispo–Santa Barbara); VTA light rail: Green Line; Santa Cruz METRO, VTA; Greyhound Lines

== Governance ==
The Capitol Corridor is fully funded by the state through Caltrans Division of Rail and Mass Transportation (DRMT). Caltrans managed the line from its inception in 1991 to 1997, but in 1998 the administration of the route was transferred to Capitol Corridor Joint Powers Authority (CCJPA), formed by transit agencies of which the Capitol Corridor serves in order to have more local control, while still funded by Caltrans. CCJPA in turn contracted with BART for day-to-day management and staff support; also, CCJPA makes decisions on the service level of Capitol Corridor, capital improvements along the route, and passenger amenities aboard the trains.

The Capitol Corridor Joint Powers Authority is governed by a board of directors which consists of 16 representatives from its member agencies:

- Placer County Transportation Planning Agency (PCTPA)
- Solano Transportation Authority (STA)
- Yolo County Transportation District (YCTD)
- Sacramento Regional Transit District (SacRT)
- San Francisco Bay Area Rapid Transit District (BART)
- Santa Clara Valley Transportation Authority (VTA)

== Rolling stock ==
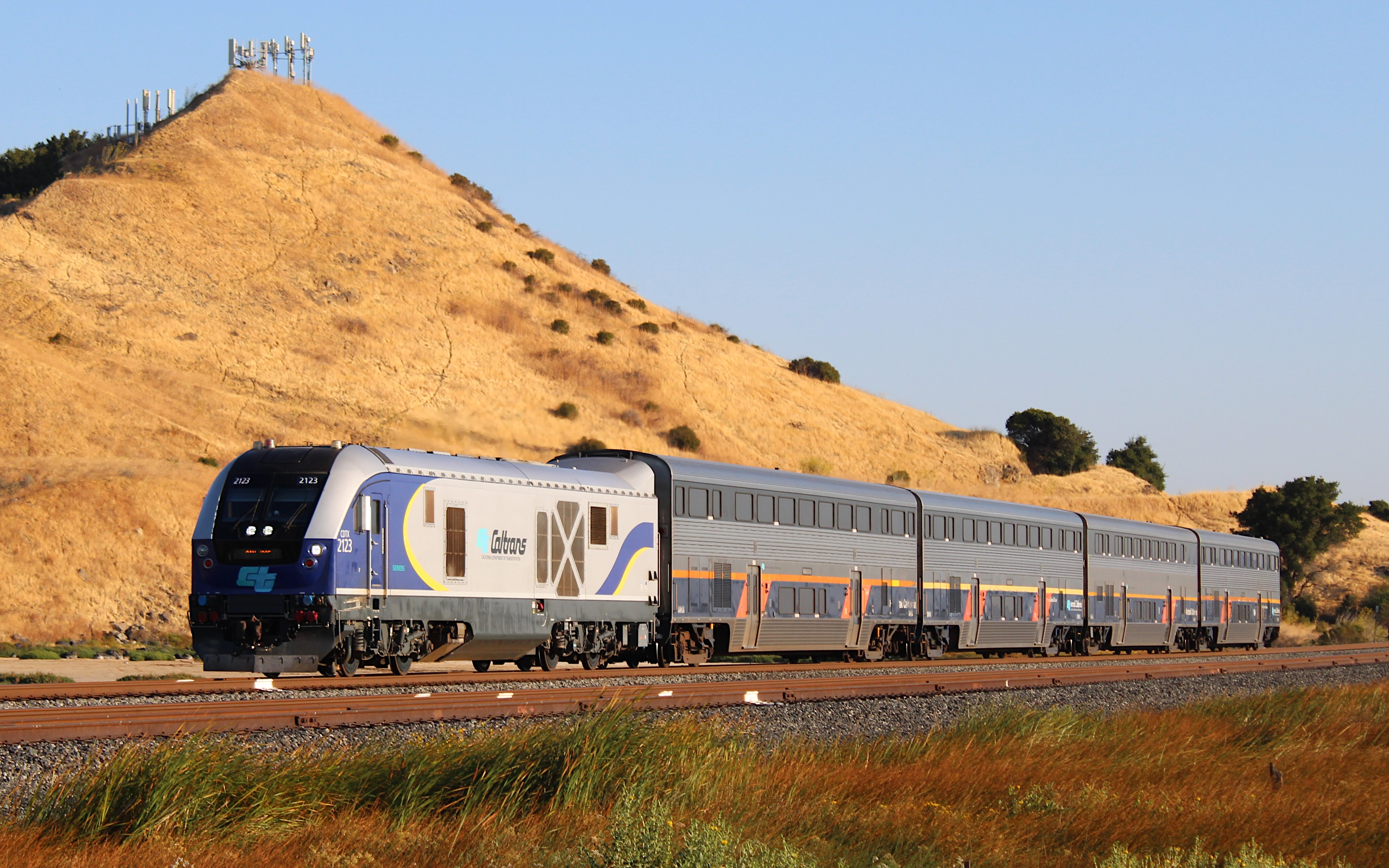
A typical Capitol Corridor train with a Charger locomotive and California Cars.

=== Locomotives ===
The Capitol Corridor and Gold Runner share a combined fleet of 13 EMD F59PHI and ten Siemens Charger SC-44 locomotives.

The Charger locomotives meet EPA Tier IV emission standards and are capable of operating at 125 mph in revenue service. Many of the F59PHI have been re-engined to meet more stringent EPA Tier II emission standards.

These locomotives are owned by Caltrans and carry its CDTX reporting marks. Amtrak-owned locomotives are also occasionally used on the Capitol Corridor, including the P42DC.

=== Passenger cars ===
The Capitol Corridor service is equipped with Amtrak California's fleet of California Car bi-level, high-capacity passenger cars owned by Caltrans. Each trainset typically consists of one or two coach cars, a coach/baggage car, a café (food service) car, and a cab/coach car. The cab/coach car is similar to other coaches but with an engineer's operating cab and headlights on one end, allowing the train to be operated in push-pull mode, which eliminates the need to turn the train at each end-point.

Caltrans also owns several Surfliner bi-level cars that are used on some Capitol Corridor trainsets. The newer cars look very similar to the California Car fleet but feature reclining seats, open overhead luggage racks, and a restroom on the upper level of each car.

The bi-level cars have doors that can operated remotely on either side of the train from a single point of control. This feature allows the operator to maximize passenger flow in boarding and alighting operations, and thereby minimizing station dwell time.

=== Maintenance ===
Daily inspections, cleaning, and maintenance of equipment are conducted in Sacramento and at the Oakland Maintenance Facility. Heavy maintenance is performed by Transit Services America in Stockton. Previously, all maintenance took place in Oakland, but both the Capitol Corridor and Gold Runner voted to shift to a new contractor in 2023, citing the contractor's ability to adhere to high maintenance quality and cleanliness and be more agile with overhaul projects.
