= Roseville station (California) =

Train station in Roseville, California, US

Roseville, CA
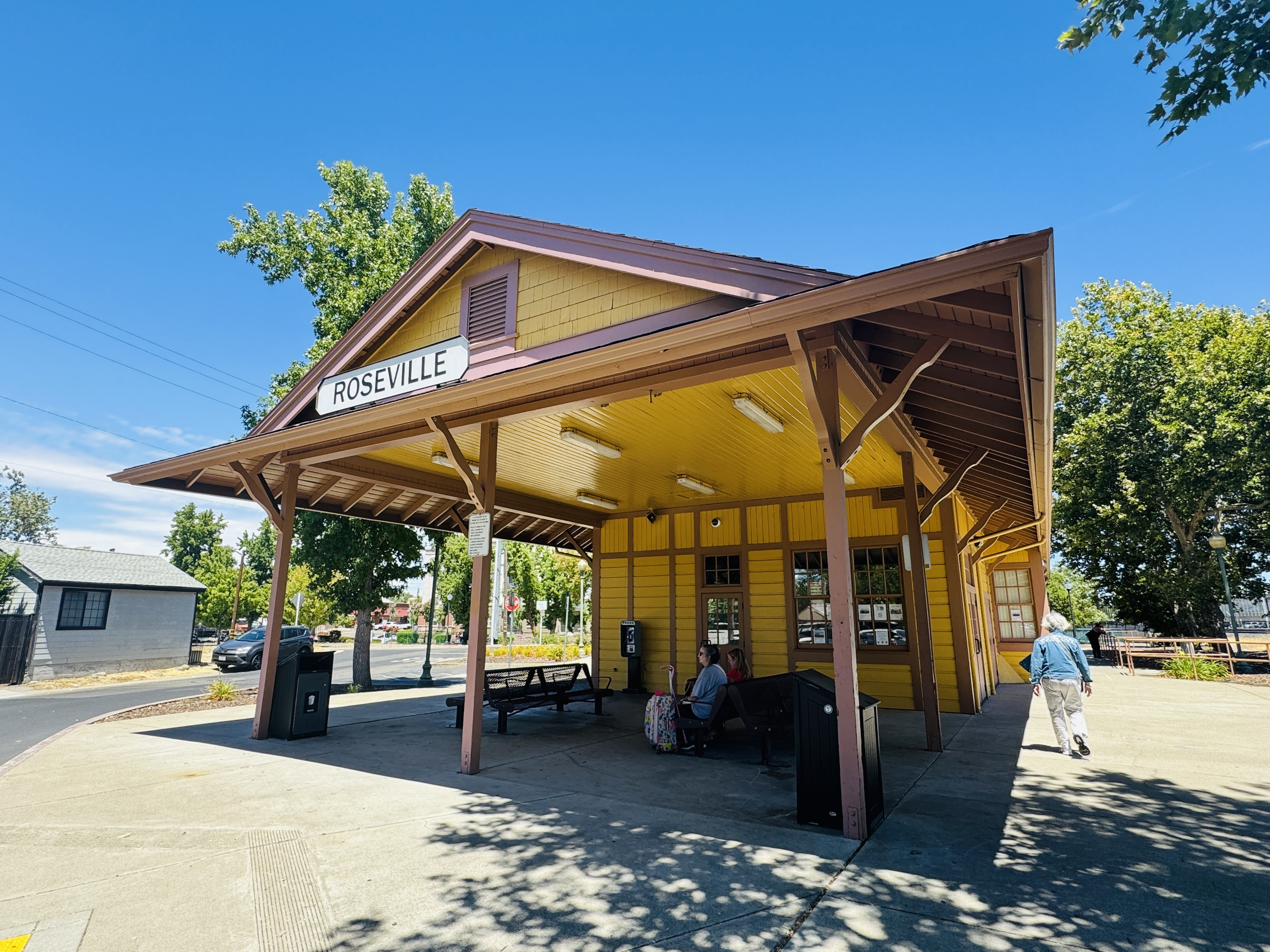
- Roseville station in July 2025.

General information
- Location: 201 Pacific Street; Roseville, California; United States
- Coordinates: 38.7500°N 121.2862°W
- Owner: Amtrak
- Line: UP Martinez Subdivision
- Platforms: 1 side platform
- Tracks: 1
- Connections: Amtrak Thruway: 20

Construction
- Accessible: yes

Other information
- Station code: Amtrak: RSV

History
- Opened: October 25, 1987

Passengers
- FY 2025: 37,157 (Amtrak)

Services
Preceding station	Amtrak	Following station
Sacramento toward Emeryville	California Zephyr	Colfax toward Chicago
Sacramento toward San Jose	Capitol Corridor	Rocklin toward Auburn
Former services
Preceding station	Southern Pacific Railroad	Following station
Foothill Farms toward Oakland Pier	Overland Route	Sawtell toward Ogden
Terminus	Shasta Route Via East Side Sacramento Valley	Wheatland toward Portland
Location

Roseville station is an Amtrak train station in Roseville, California, United States. It is served by the long-distance California Zephyr and regional Capitol Corridor.

== History ==
Passenger rail service to Roseville ended on May 1, 1971, when Amtrak took over intercity passenger service. Although Amtrak continued running the City of San Francisco, the stop at Roseville was discontinued. When the Coast Starlight was rerouted over Southern Pacific's East Sacramento Valley Line in 1982, Roseville was not included as a stop for the train. The City of San Francisco's successor, the California Zephyr, began stopping at Roseville on October 25, 1987.

The Capitols (later renamed Capitol Corridor) began running between San Jose and Sacramento on December 12, 1991, with one of its three daily round trips running to Roseville. A new station building opened on March 5, 1994. It is a replica of similar Southern Pacific Railroad stations from the early 20th century.

== Gallery ==
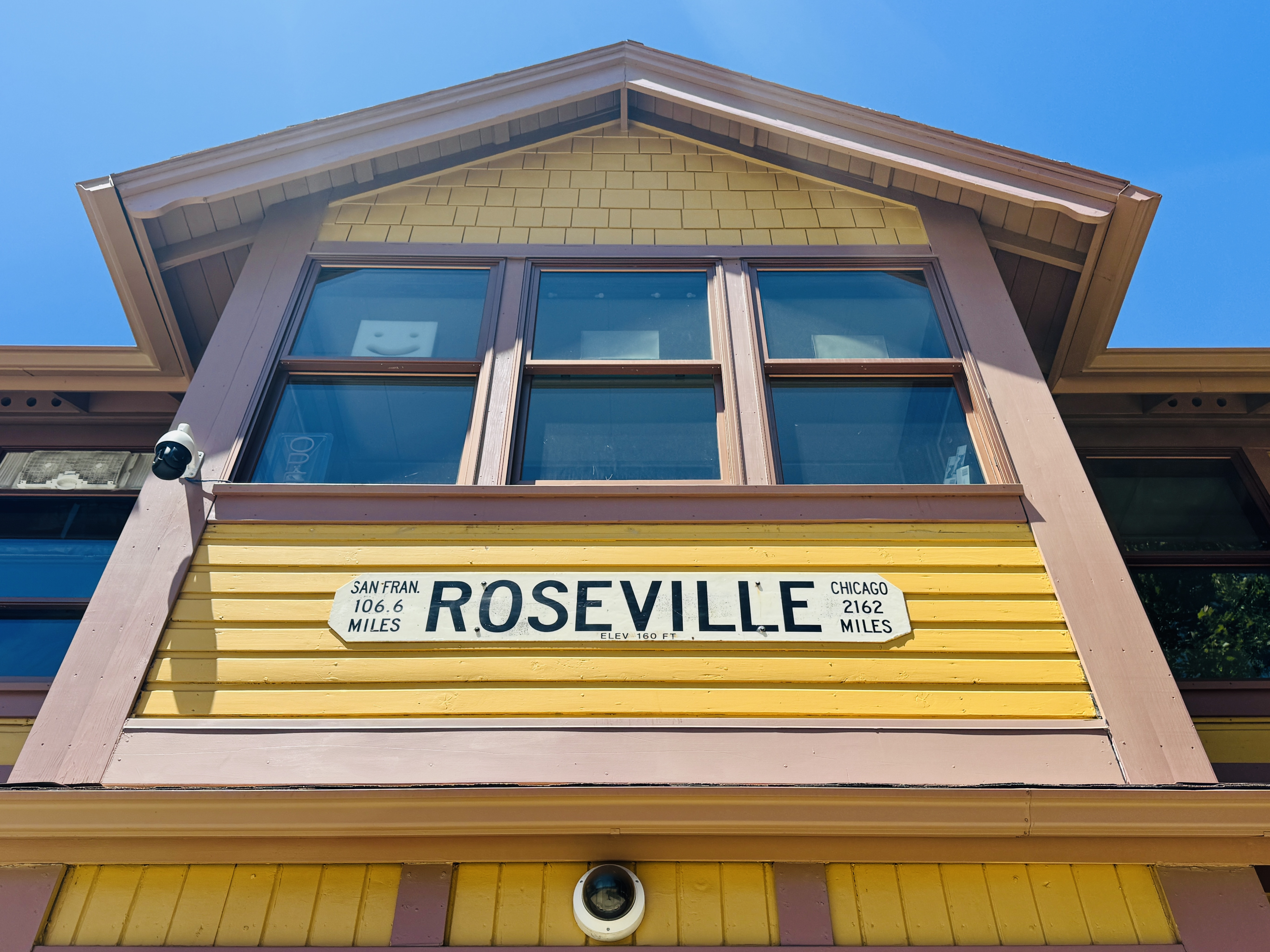
Exterior in July 2025.

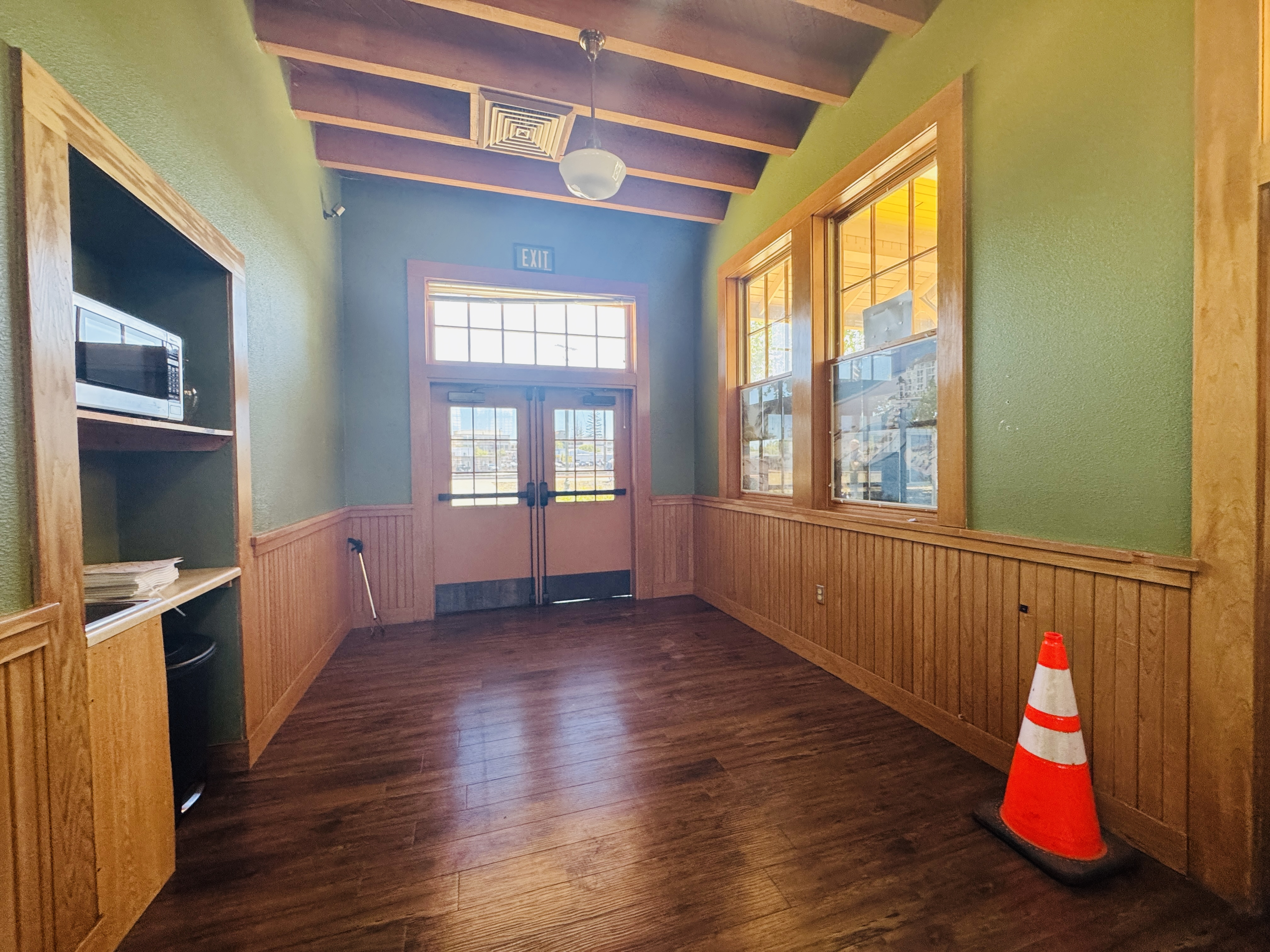
Interior in July 2025.

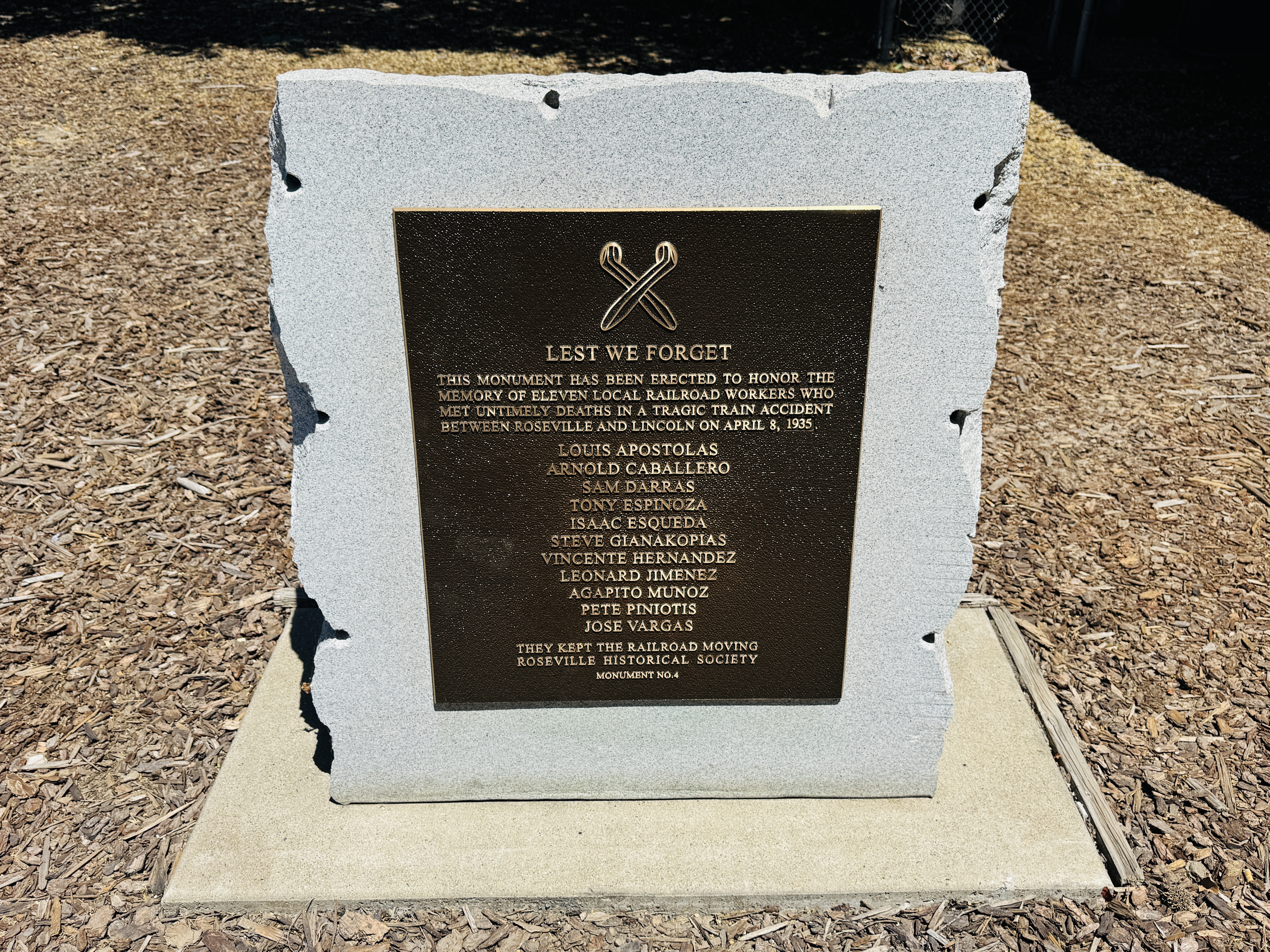
Memorial to 11 railroad workers killed in a collision in April 8, 1935.

== See also ==
- Davis Yard
