= Marysville station (California) =

Former train station in Marysville, California, US

Marysville, CA
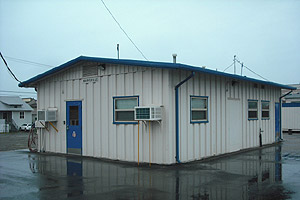
- The station building as seen in 2011

General information
- Location: 6th Street; Marysville, California
- Coordinates: 39.1413°N 121.5847°W
- Line: UP Valley Subdivision
- Platforms: 1 side platform
- Tracks: 1

History
- Opened: April 25, 1982 (Amtrak)
- Closed: c. 1958 (SP); 1999 (Amtrak)

Former services
Preceding station	Amtrak	Following station
Sacramento toward Los Angeles	Coast Starlight	Chico toward Seattle
Preceding station	Southern Pacific Railroad	Following station
Live Oak toward Oakland Pier	Shasta Route Via East Side Sacramento Valley	Wheatland toward Portland
Terminus	Marysville – Oroville	Honcut toward Oroville
Location

Marysville station was the last passenger rail station to operate in Marysville, California.

The depot was a stop on the Southern Pacific Shasta Route until their services here ceased in 1958. Passenger trains to the city ceased in 1970 when the original California Zephyr was discontinued. Amtrak's formation in 1971 left Marysville out of the nation's "basic system," but a California Senate Joint Resolution from 1974 requested that the Coast Starlight be rerouted through Sacramento including a stop in Marysville. Despite opposition from Southern Pacific, service began on April 25, 1982. Amtrak ceased operating at the station by November 1999, as the service was rerouted over the shorter Sacramento Subdivision. The former Marysville Western Pacific Depot on that line was not reactivated, ending service to the city. Union Pacific continues to use the station building as a field office. As of 2023, rail service is planned to return to Marysville, though with a station along the former Western Pacific alignment as part of the North Valley Rail project.
