= China Slough =

Historical Landmark in Sacramento, United States

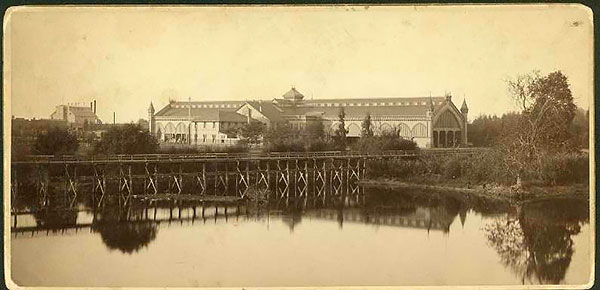
- Old Central Pacific Depot and Trestle Bridge over the China Slough in 1878.

- Location within California Location within the United States
- 38.584°N 121.500°W
- Location: 401 I Street, Sacramento, California

History
- Built: 1849

California Historical Landmark
- Reference no.: 594

Chinese event on I Street, China Slough, in 1882

China Slough (also called: Sutter Slough, China Lake, Sutter Lake, Sacramento Chinatown, Sacramento Chinadom, Old Sacramento Chinatown, Yee Fow, Wanoho Pakan), is a historical site in Sacramento, California. The site of the former China Slough is California Historical Landmark No. 594, registered on May 22, 1957. The site of California Historical Landmark China Slough is the northeast corner of 4th Street and I Street in Sacramento at about 401 I Street. Before the China Slough was filled in, the waterway ran from 3rd Street to 5th Streets to north of I Street in Sacramento. The site became the Central Pacific Railroad Sacramento station built in 1910. The 1910 station had a wooden Trestle bridge built over the China Slough. A new depot was built nearby, the Sacramento Valley Station in 1926, and is now operated by Amtrak. The China Slough ran almost where the current Amtrak train tracks run today.

== History ==
The slough was a swampy, slow-flowing channel of water off the Sacramento River in to the city of Sacramento. Before the Central Valley was settled by European and Chinese immigrants, the Nisenan and Miwok peoples of the region called the slough Wanoho Pakan. On each bank of the China Slough was the old Sacramento Chinatown. Before a Chinese population moved in, it was called Sutter Slough. The first group of Chinese immigrants came to Sacramento from 1849 to 1853, to escape the poor conditions in southeastern China. In southeastern China there was a famine, a very poor economy, and high taxes due to the Opium Wars (1839-1860), Taiping Rebellion (1850-1864) and Punti–Hakka Clan Wars (1855–1868). From 1849 to 1853, about 24,000 young Chinese men immigrated to California looking to improve their lives. The next group of Chinese immigrants came to Sacramento to help build the First transcontinental railroad starting in 1863. From 1863 and 1869, about 15,000 Chinese workers helped build the transcontinental railroad. The train tracks started in Sacramento and headed east. The non-Chinese Sacramento pioneers did not want the swampy slough, so the Chinese community was free to live there. They built up the slough into a waterfront town. The Chinese immigrants brought in a host of skills: merchants opened stores, cooks opened restaurants, laundrymen opened laundry services, entertainers put on theatre shows, and entrepreneurs served the needs not only in Chinatown but in the city. Sutter Lake was formed seasonally in the slough with spring and winter flooded. China Slough bathhouses were popular with all.

In December 1856, a local Chinese Daily News (沙架免度新錄, Cantonese transliteration for Sacramento News) was founded by Ze Too Yune (司徒源), the first Chinese-run overseas Chinese newspaper. In March 1858, the Sacramento Chinese held a local Chinese Regatta in Sutter Lake, Festival of the Dragon Boat, with its Sze Yup (四邑) Company racing its Sam Yup (三邑) Company, which drew a large crowd lining the levee to view the contest. The main part of Sacramento Chinatown was located on I Street (the slough's levee road) from Second to Sixth Streets. Flood waters overflowed the levee and into Chinatown and the city a few times between 1850 and 1862.

The Sze Yup Association was set up to greet new Chinese immigrants as they departed ships and helped them find housing and jobs, some trained to head to the gold mines, called Gam Saan (gold mountain). Other such Chinese organizations were formed in California also, like the Suey Sing Association. Sze Yup Association set up a charity house in China Slough and owned other China Slough buildings. In China Slough, Sacramento was often called in Cantonese Yee Fow (二埠, Second City), as San Francisco was called Dai Fow (大埠, The Big City).

Like other early pioneers town, the China Slough buildings and houses were made of wood. There were a number of fires that burnt parts of the China Slough. China Slough was rebuilt after each fire. The July 1854 fire burnt much of downtown China Slough. After the July 1855 fire, that was let to burn by the city, the Sacramento Board of Trustees passed an ordinance requiring new buildings be built with bricks. Much of the China Slough was rebuilt with brick buildings. In 1880, the city cut off the China Slough from the Sacramento River, ending the China Slough fishing industry and making the water stagnant and smelly. The Chinese Exclusion Act of 1882, stopped new Chinese immigration and reinforced hostilities to Chinese. In 1909, The City of Sacramento found a way to close the China Slough, a new railway station and train tracks would be built on the China Slough. All the Chinese buildings and house closed and the town was buried. Filling in of the Slough started in 1863 from sand from the American River and was complete in 1910, when a new railyard and station were built. The last land fill and elimination of the China Slough was 1919. Chinatown moved south to Front Street and spread out from the closed down China Slough. When the Sacramento Capitol Mall was built in 1965 some of the Front Street Chinatown was displaced. There is a small area around I Street and J Street that makes up the modern Sacramento Chinatown, including the 1959 Confucius Temple of Sacramento.

The Yee Fow Museum in Sacramento and Yee Fow Center for History, work to preserve the Sacramento Chinatown history.

- China Slough companies

Some of the China Slough firms:

- Canton Chinese Theater
- Moor's Opera House starting in 1879
- Sze Yup Association offices
- Sze Yup Association charity house
- Chinese Daily News (沙架免度新錄) 1856-1858
- Five cigar factories
- Two shoe making shops
- Wholesaler Wah Hing
- Wholesaler Ye Chung
- Wholesaler Tong Wo Yaun
- Wholesaler J. Henare and Co.
- 15 grocery stores
- Two fish markets, Tong Sung Fish, Capitol Poultry and Fish Market
- Plate factory
- Produce markets, including: Fulton Market, Lincoln Market, Quopng Fung
- Bathhouses
- Three restaurants
- Six barber shops
- Seven physicians offices
- Four butcher shops
- Two slaughter yards
- Bing Hong Tong club
- Yang gambling houses
- 43 laundries (citywide)
- Pawnshop
- Joss house Chinese Temple moved to 915 Third Street
- Christian Church, Rev. J. Lewis Shuck
- Congregational Christian Mission
- Gee Kung Tong Chinese Christian Mission
- Two drug stores
- Three Tailor Shops
- Que Lup Wah Gong Tong School
- Wah Hun Hawk How School (Chinese Baptists)

== Population ==
While United States census, before 1860, did not count the China Slough or Chinese in Sacramento County, by 1860 the China Slough and Chinese in Sacramento County were recorded:

- 1860 1,731
- 1870 3,595
- 1880 4,892
- 1890 4,371
- 1900 3,254

== Gallery ==
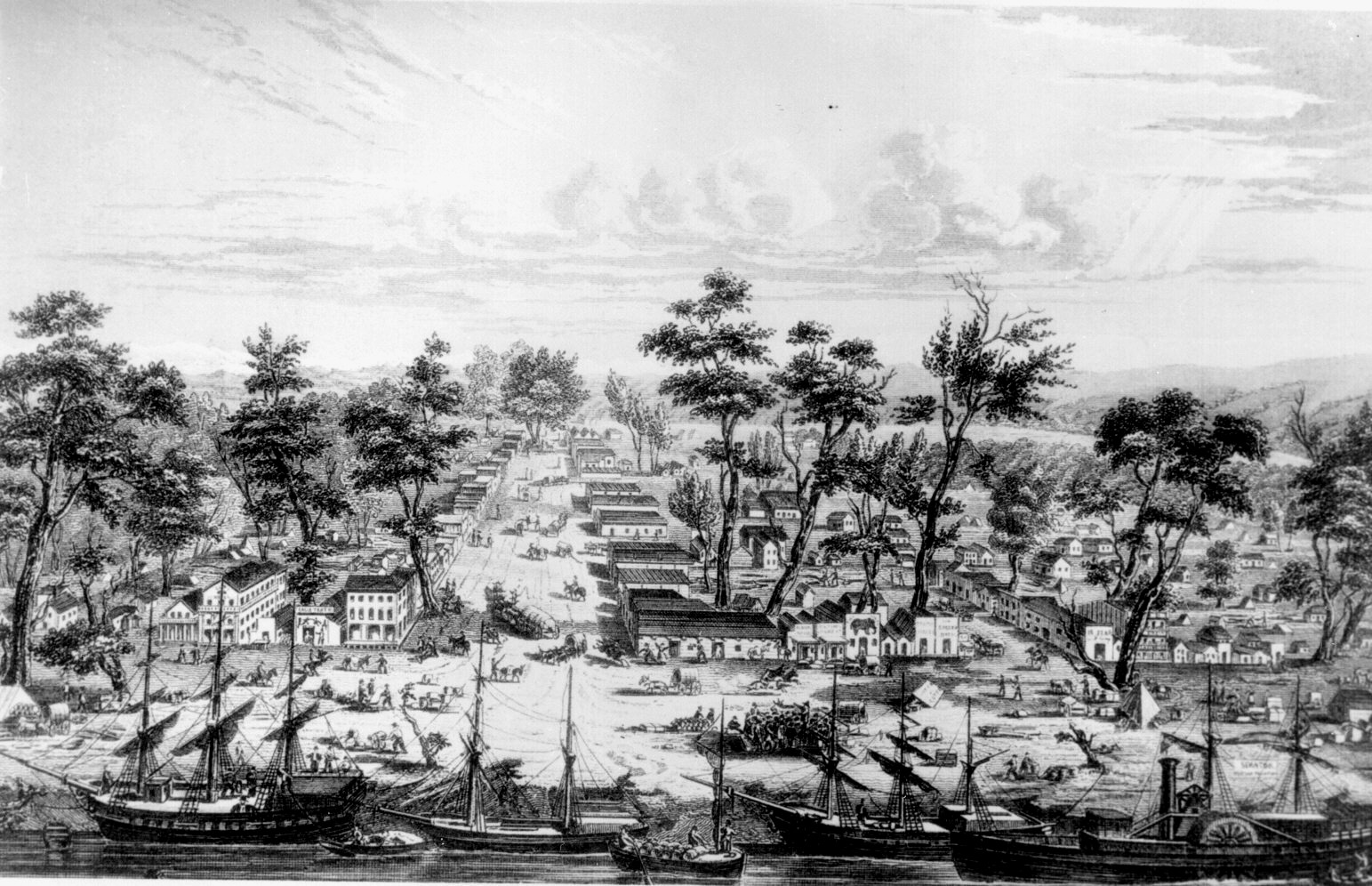
Sacramento in 1855

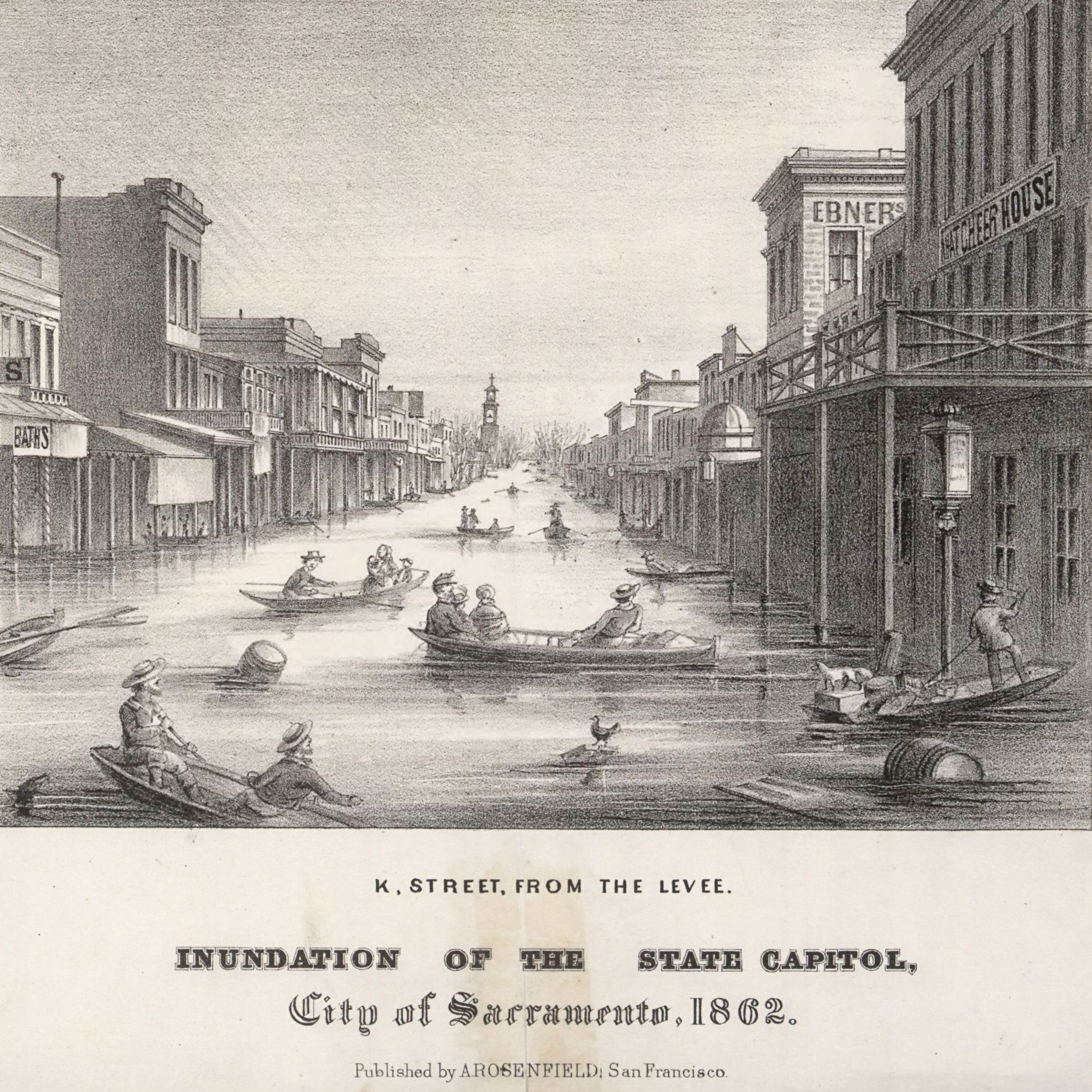
Great Flood of 1862

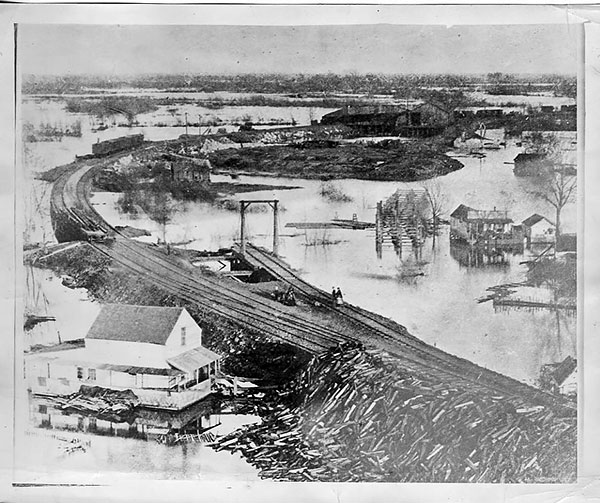
China Slough and the railroad construction project along I Street during the great flood of 1862

Map of Sacramento, California in 1880 with Sutter Lake and Central Pacific RR station; China Slough had been cut off from the Sacramento River (left) in 1880.

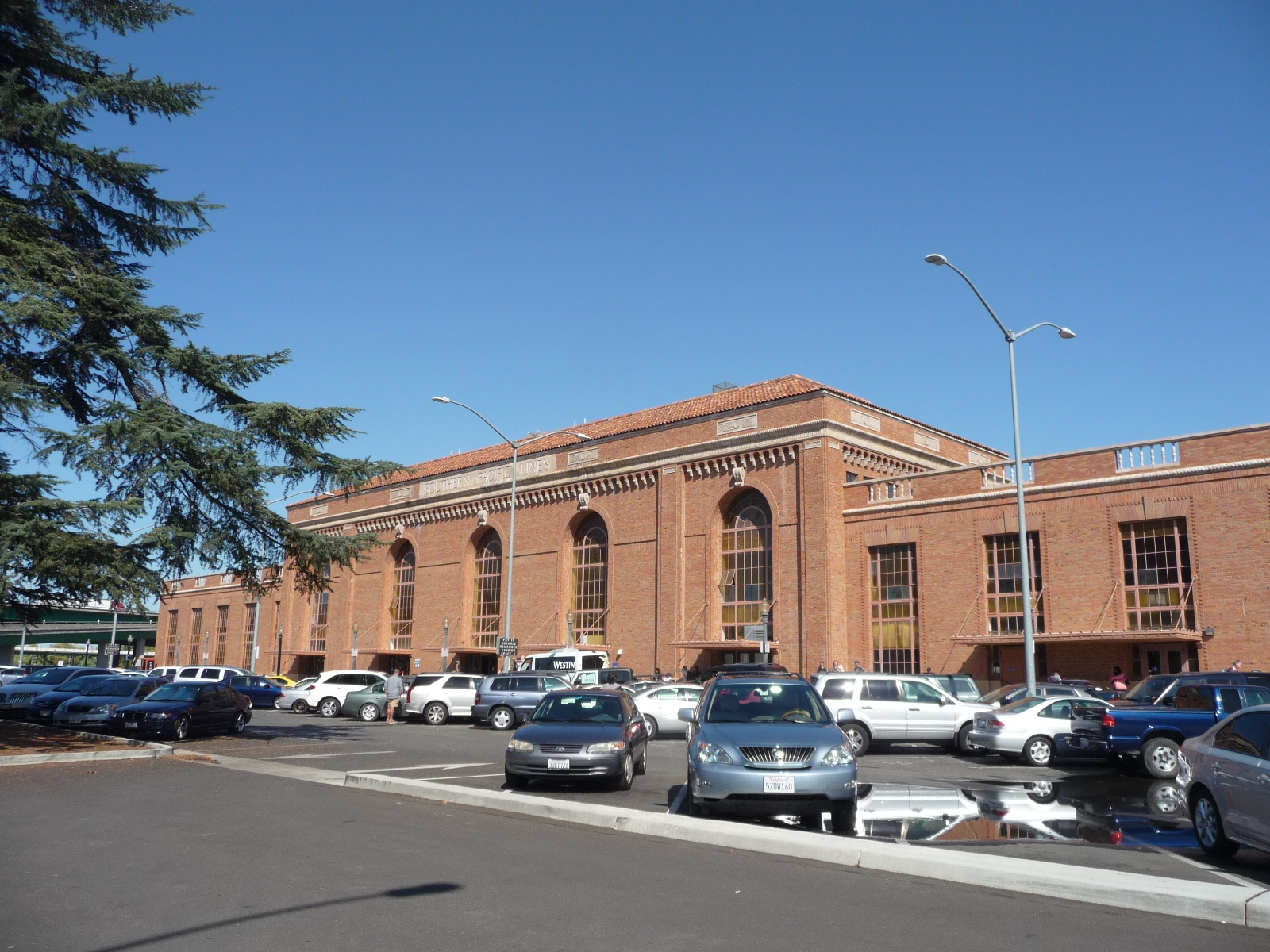
Sacramento Valley Station, on the site of the former China Slough

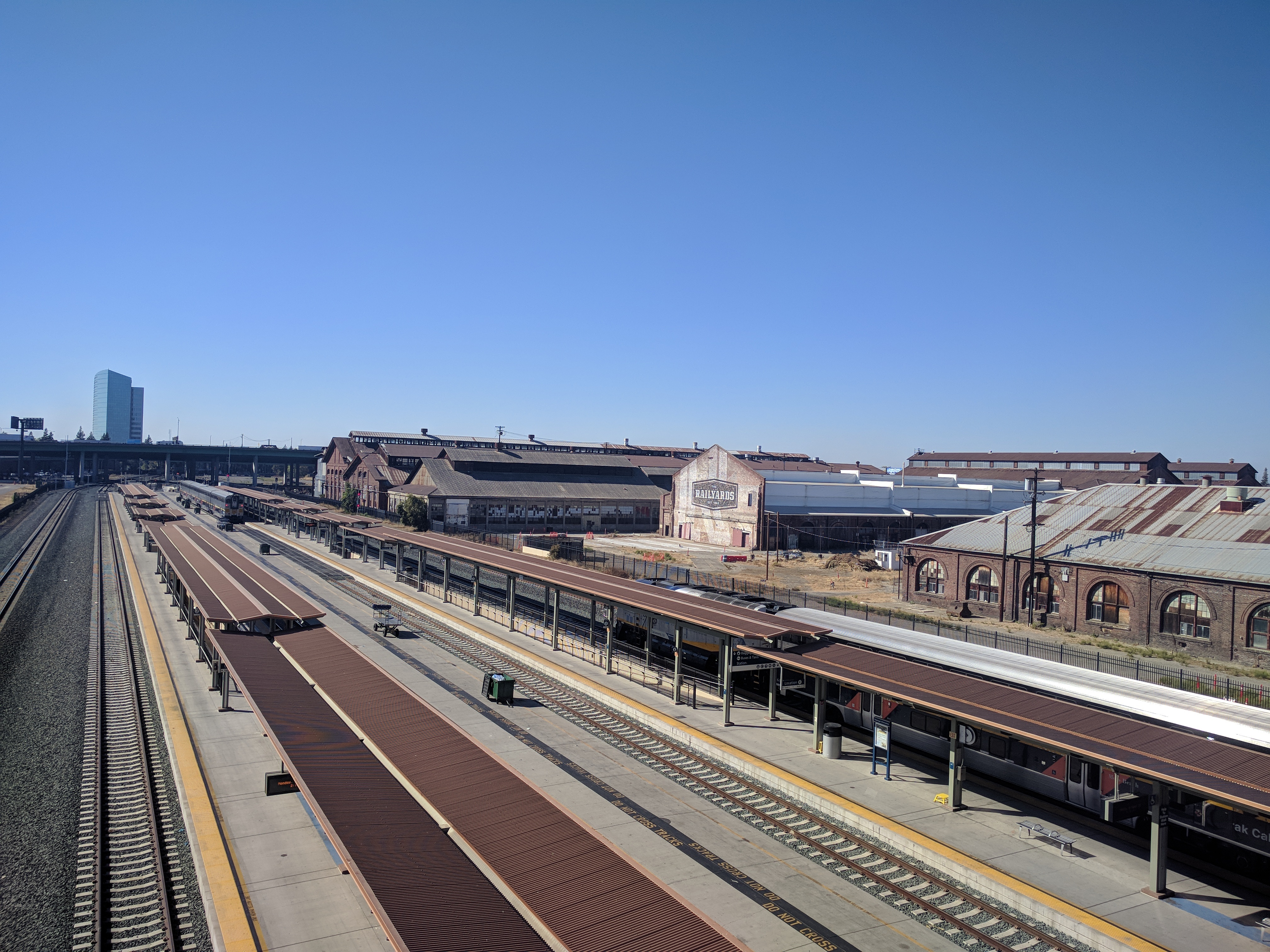
Sacramento Valley Station tracks follow the path of the former China Slough.

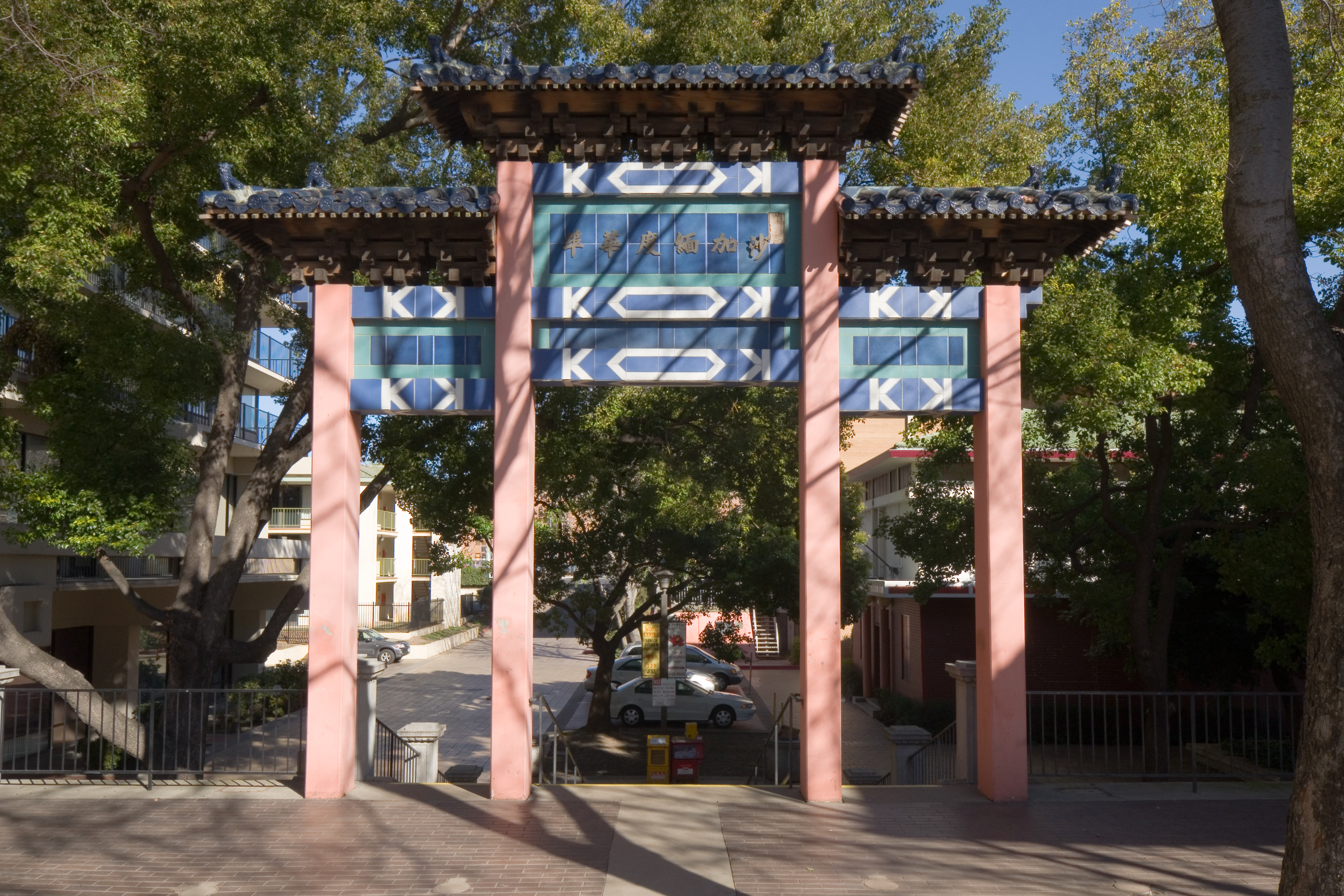
Sacramento Chinatown Mall Paifang in 2013

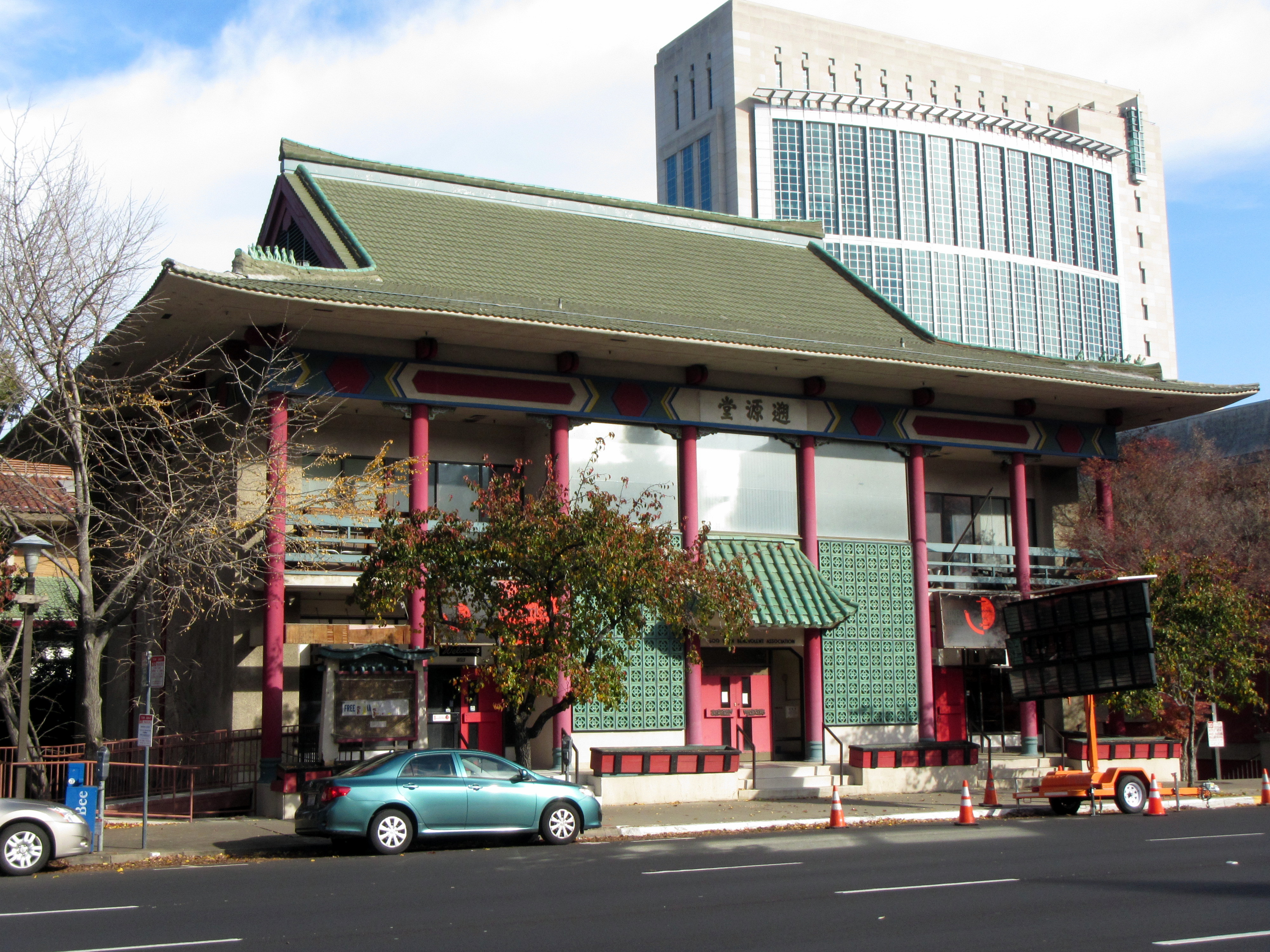
Sacramento Chinatown 溯源堂 in 2012

== See also ==
- California Historical Landmarks in Sacramento County
- Capitol Mall
- Chinese Historical Society of America
- Frank Fat's
- Locke, California
- Walnut Grove, California
