= Chico station =

Intercity rail station in Chico, California

Chico, CA
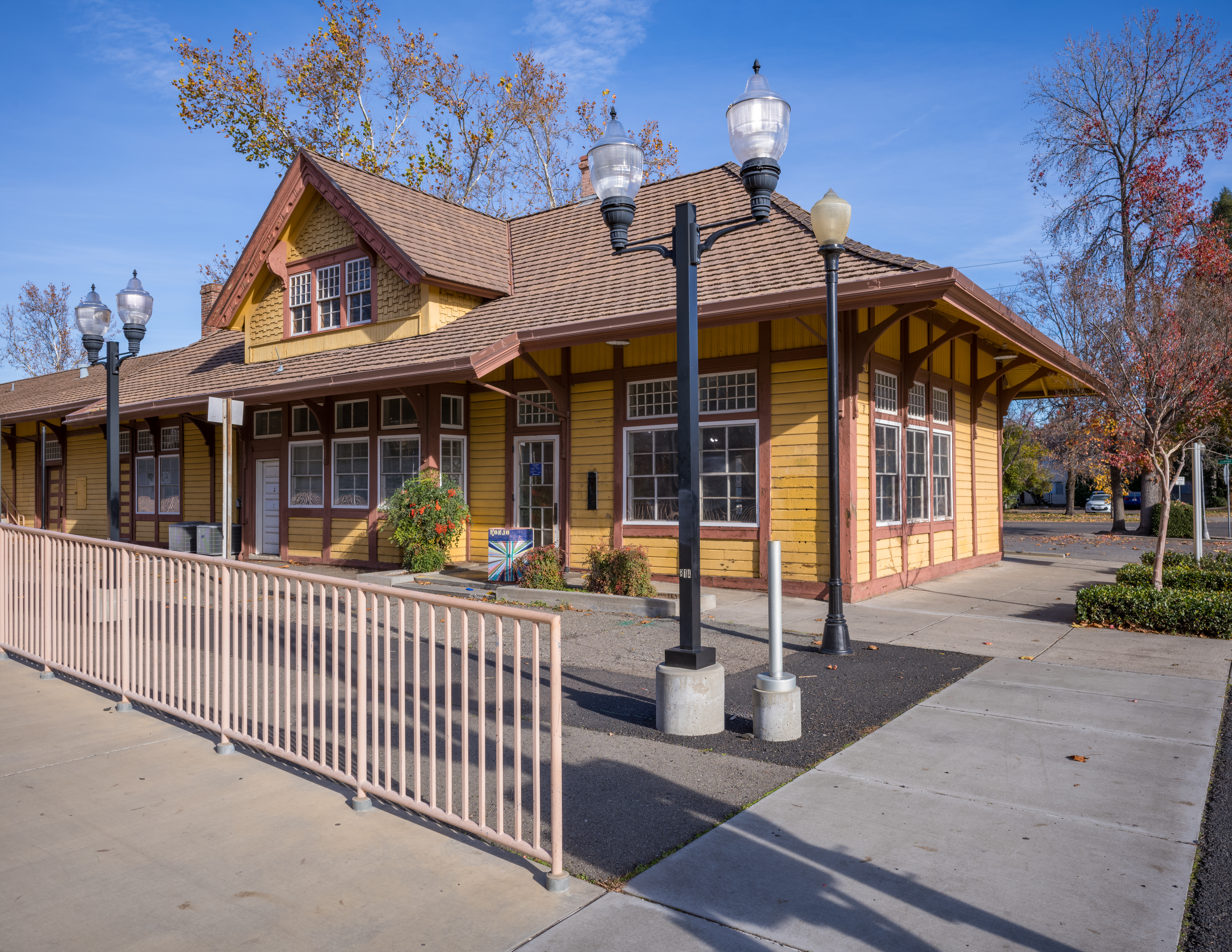
- Chico station in December 2023

General information
- Location: 450 Orange Street; Chico, California; United States
- Coordinates: 39.7233°N 121.8461°W
- Owner: City of Chico
- Platforms: 1 side platform
- Tracks: 1
- Bus operators: Amtrak Thruway: 3; Glenn Ride; Greyhound Lines; FlixBus

Construction
- Parking: Yes
- Cycle facilities: Yes
- Accessible: Yes

Other information
- Station code: Amtrak: CIC

History
- Opened: July 2, 1870; April 25, 1982 (Amtrak)
- Closed: 1957
- Rebuilt: 1892, 1988

Passengers
- FY 2025: 9,749 (Amtrak)

Services
Preceding station	Amtrak	Following station
Sacramento toward Los Angeles	Coast Starlight	Redding toward Seattle
Former services
Preceding station	Amtrak	Following station
Marysville (1982-99) toward Los Angeles	Coast Starlight	Redding toward Seattle
Preceding station	Southern Pacific Railroad	Following station
Durham toward Oakland Pier	Shasta Route Via East Side Sacramento Valley	Vina toward Portland
Barber toward Stirling City	Butte County Railroad	Terminus
- Southern Pacific Depot
- U.S. National Register of Historic Places
- Coordinates: 39°42′24.0″N 121°50′8.0″W
- Architectural style: Carpenter Gothic
- NRHP reference No.: 87000001
- Added to NRHP: January 29, 1987
Location

Chico station is an intercity rail station in the South Campus Neighborhood of Chico, California. It is served by the single daily round trip of the Amtrak Coast Starlight service. The station building was constructed by the Southern Pacific Railroad in 1892; it was listed in the National Register of Historic Places in 1987. The Greyhound bus station is located adjacent to the Amtrak station.

== History ==
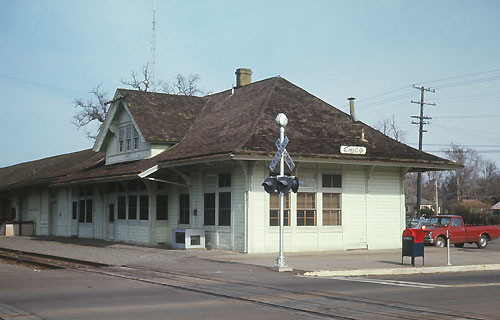
Chico station in 1969

The station was built by the Southern Pacific Railroad in 1892, replacing an older structure built in 1870 by the California and Oregon Railroad. A local streetcar line of the Sacramento Northern Railway served the station between 1905 and 1947.

The station was shown in the 1947 film Magic Town when James Stewart's character arrives in the fictional town of Grandview. During his 1952 vice presidential campaign, Richard Nixon was talking on the pay phone at the station when he got the news from the campaign headquarters that he would have to respond to the Checkers issue with the 'Checkers speech'.

Passenger rail service to Chico ceased in 1957, but was reactivated when Amtrak rerouted the Coast Starlight to its current alignment in 1982. The city and the Chamber of Commerce saved the current structure from demolition through an agreement with the Southern Pacific Railroad in 1987. That same year, the depot was listed in the National Register of Historic Places as the Southern Pacific Depot. The building is also home to the Chico Art Center.

While the Butte County Association of Governments has looked in to establishment of weekday bus service from Chico to Sacramento, their plan called for the bus to depart not from the station but rather a park and ride facility on Fir Street. A different North State Intercity Bus route received TIRCP funding in 2018 and is proposed to provide weekday feeder service to Sacramento from the Chico station.

North Valley Rail is a proposed regional rail service between Chico and Natomas.

Additional bus connections are available approximately one half-mile away at the Chico Transit Center at 2nd and Salem.

== See also ==
- National Register of Historic Places listings in Butte County, California
