= Sacramento Valley Station =

Railway station in Sacramento, California, US

Sacramento Valley Station Sacramento, CA
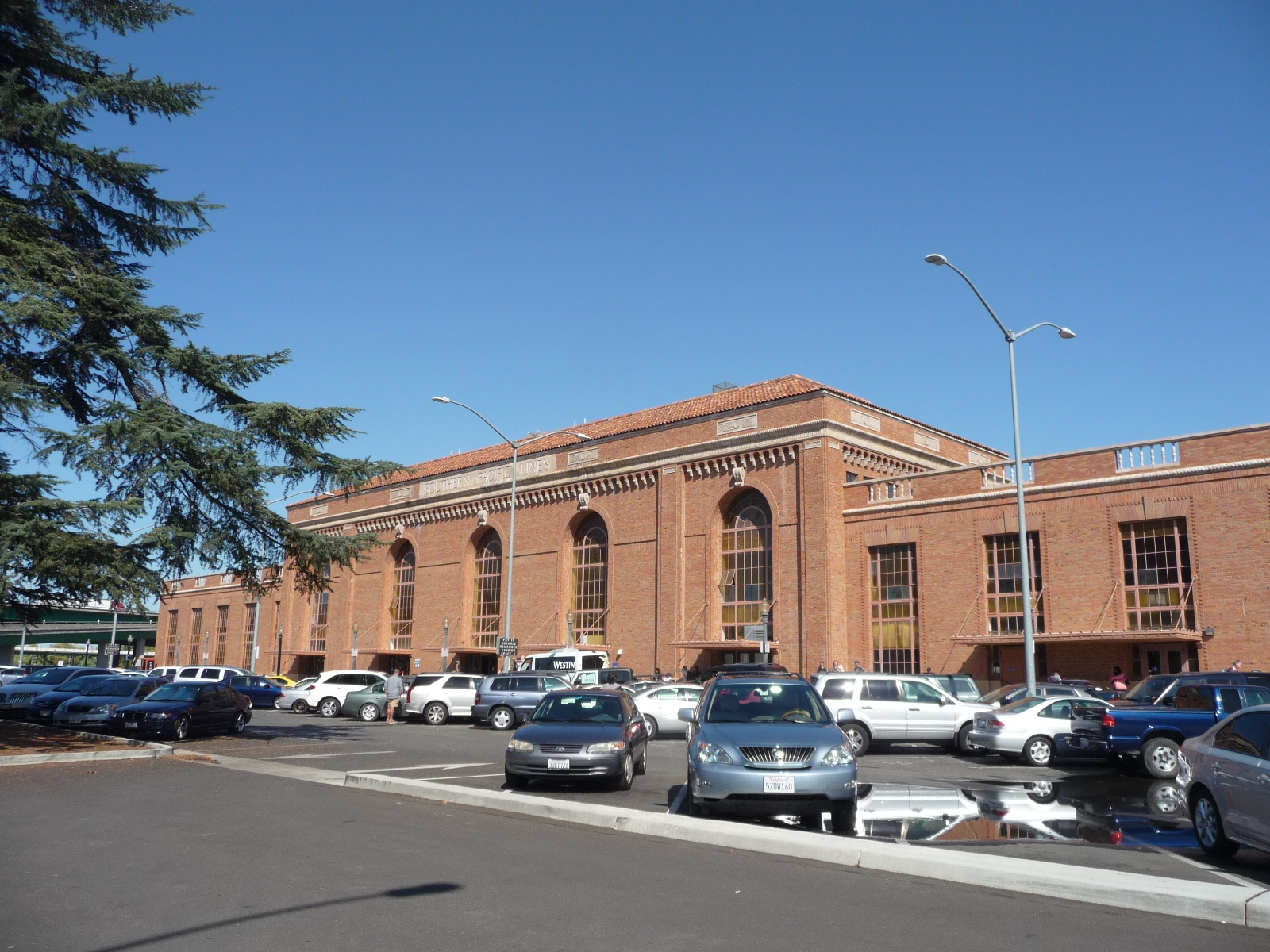
- Sacramento Valley Station in 2014

General information
- Location: 401 I Street; Sacramento, California; United States
- Coordinates: 38°35′03″N 121°30′03″W
- Owner: City of Sacramento
- Line: UP Martinez Subdivision
- Platforms: 2 island platforms (Amtrak); 1 side platform (Light Rail)
- Tracks: 4 (Amtrak); 2 (freight); 1 (Light Rail)
- Connections: Amtrak Thruway: 3, 5, 20, 20C; El Dorado Transit: SAC/SLT; Sacramento RT: 30, 38; Solano Express: 30S

Construction
- Parking: 288 long-term spaces, 45 short-term spaces
- Accessible: Yes
- Architect: Bliss & Faville
- Architectural style: Late 19th and 20th Century Revivals

Other information
- Status: Staffed, checked baggage service available
- Station code: Amtrak: SAC
- Website: Official website

History
- Opened: February 27, 1926; 100 years ago December 8, 2006; 19 years ago (Gold Line)

Passengers
- FY 2025: 764,100 (Amtrak)

Services
Preceding station	Amtrak	Following station
Davis toward Emeryville	California Zephyr	Roseville toward Chicago
Davis toward San Jose	Capitol Corridor	Roseville toward Auburn
Davis toward Los Angeles	Coast Starlight	Chico toward Seattle
Terminus	Gold Runner	Lodi toward Bakersfield
Preceding station	SacRT	Following station
Terminus	Gold Line	8th & H One-way operation
Terminus	Gold Line	7th & I toward Historic Folsom
Former services
Preceding station	Amtrak	Following station
Davis toward Los Angeles	Coast Starlight	Marysville (1982–1999) toward Seattle
Davis toward Los Angeles	Spirit of California (1981–1983)	Terminus
Preceding station	Southern Pacific Railroad	Following station
Davis toward Oakland Pier	Shasta Route Via East Side Sacramento Valley	Roseville toward Portland
Davis toward Oakland Pier	Overland Route	Roseville toward Ogden
Baths toward Isleton	Sacramento Southern Railroad	Terminus
Terminus	Sacramento Daylight	Brighton toward Los Angeles
- Southern Pacific Railroad Company's Sacramento Depot
- U.S. National Register of Historic Places
- NRHP reference No.: 75000457
- Added to NRHP: April 21, 1975
Location

Sacramento Valley Station is an Amtrak railway station in the city of Sacramento, California, at 401 I Street on the corner of Fifth Street, built in 1926 on the site of China Slough. It is the thirteenth busiest Amtrak station in the country, and the second busiest in the Western United States. It is served by four different Amtrak train routes and connecting Amtrak Thruway motorcoaches. It is also the western terminus for the Gold Line of the SacRT light rail system and the Route 30 bus serving California State University, Sacramento.

== Services ==
=== Amtrak ===
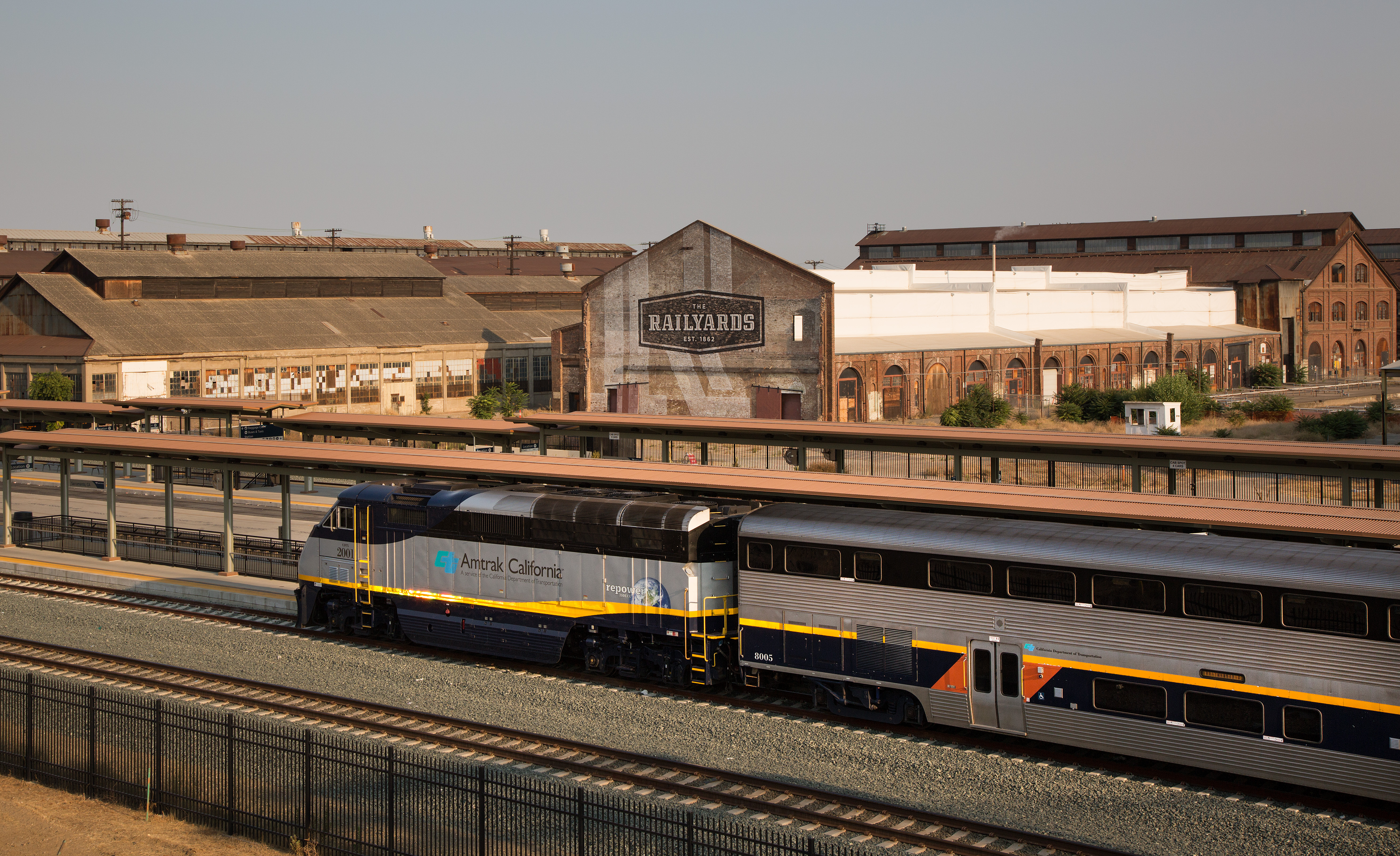
A Capitol Corridor train at Sacramento in August 2016

Sacramento is served by four Amtrak routes: two daily long-distance routes, and two Amtrak California corridor routes with multiple daily trains, for a total of 38 daily trains on weekdays and 30 each day on weekends as of 2016.

The California Zephyr and Coast Starlight are long-distance routes with one train per day in each direction.

The Gold Runner operates a single daily round trip from Bakersfield by way of Modesto and Stockton with Sacramento as the northern terminus. Connections are available via Amtrak Thruway Motorcoach to five additional daily round trips that terminate in Oakland.

The Capitol Corridor operates 15 round trips on weekdays and 11 on weekends; Sacramento is the eastern terminus for all trains except for one daily round trip which continues to Auburn.

In FY2017, Sacramento was the second busiest of Amtrak's 74 California stations, boarding or detraining an average of about 2,941 passengers daily. It is Amtrak's seventh-busiest station nationwide.

==== Amtrak Thruway ====
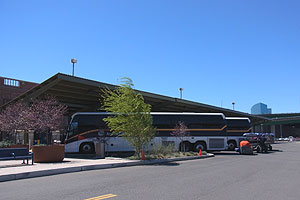
Thruway Motorcoach buses at Sacramento Valley Station

As of March 2024, Amtrak operates Amtrak Thruway bus service on three routes serving Sacramento Valley Station:

- Route 3: Northbound to Redding via Chico, Southbound to Stockton
- Route 20: Eastbound to Reno/Sparks via Colfax
- Route 20C: Eastbound to South Lake Tahoe (service operated by El Dorado Transit)

Some Thruway buses also stop at the State Capitol (Amtrak: SCS). The stop is for drop-off only, except for southbound passengers connecting to the Gold Runner at Stockton.

=== RT Light Rail ===
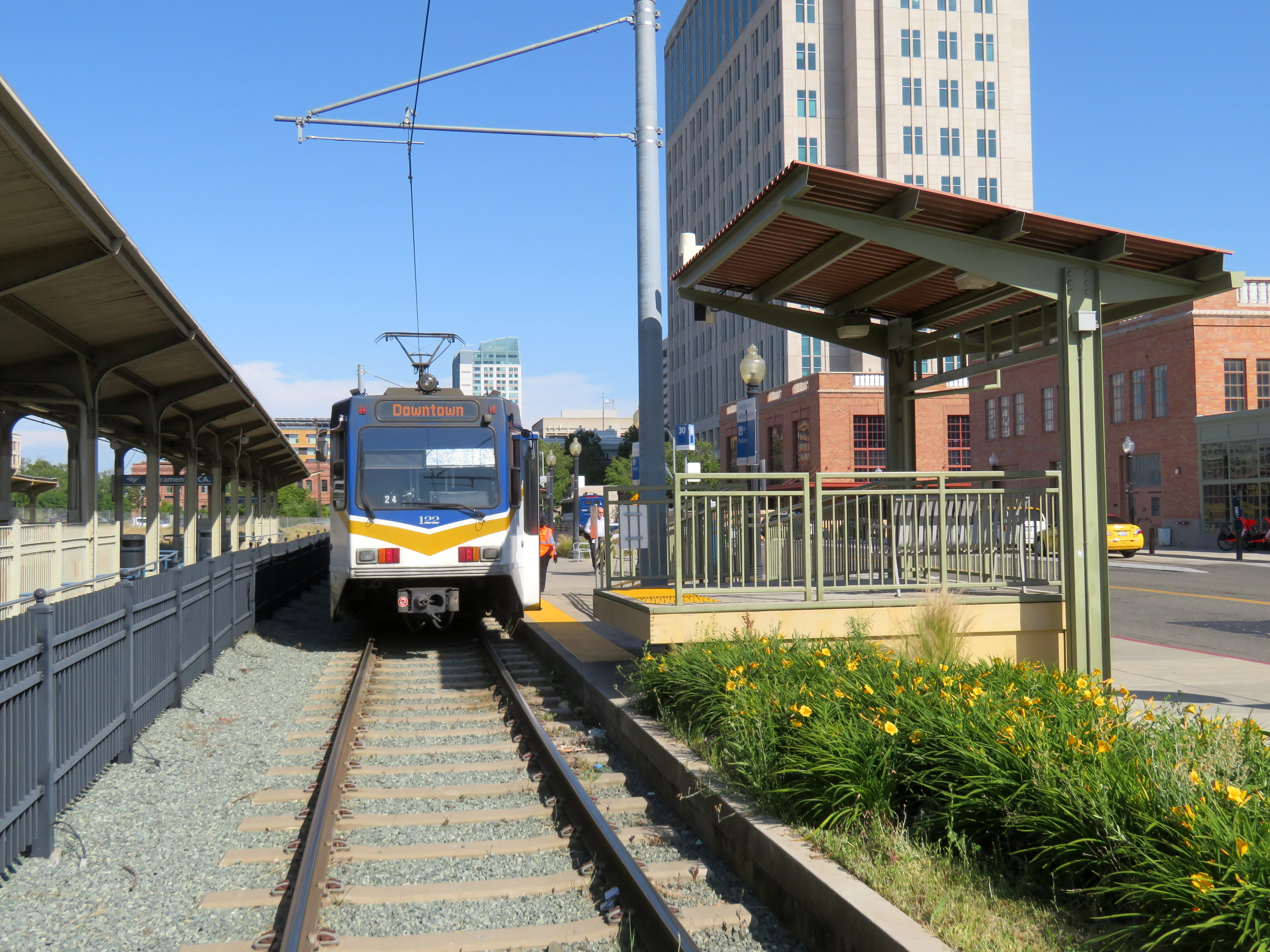
A Gold Line train at Sacramento Valley Station in 2019

Sacramento Valley Station is the western terminus of the Gold Line, one of three routes of the SacRT light rail system. The station has a single side platform serving the single-track branch line, with a two-track layover yard to the west.

SacRT is aiming to relocate the location of the Sacramento Valley Light Rail Station, from behind the Main Station Building on H street, to east of the walkway that connects the station building to Amtrak platforms, paralleling 5th Street.

=== Local and commuter bus ===
Sacramento RT bus routes 30 and 38 stop directly at the station. However, many other RT bus routes terminate in downtown Sacramento, within several blocks of the station.

El Dorado Transit's Sacramento/South Lake Tahoe (SAC/SLT) commuter bus route (which also operates as Amtrak Thruway route 20) stops directly at the station

Additionally, Amador Transit, Roseville Transit, Yolobus, and Yuba-Sutter Transit all operate commuter bus routes that terminate in downtown Sacramento.

=== Future services ===
Sacramento is planned to be the northern terminus of Phase II of the California High-Speed Rail system.

Greyhound Lines does not use Sacramento Valley Station for its competing intercity bus service; instead, its Sacramento terminal is located 1 mile (1.6 km) to the north, near the 7th & Richards / Township 9 RT Light Rail station. However, Phase 3 of the ongoing renovation project may include additional bus bays to allow Greyhound to use Sacramento Valley Station as well.

Shasta Regional Transit Agency has proposed a weekday commuter bus from Redding and Red Bluff to the Sacramento Valley Station.

== History ==
=== Pre-2006 ===
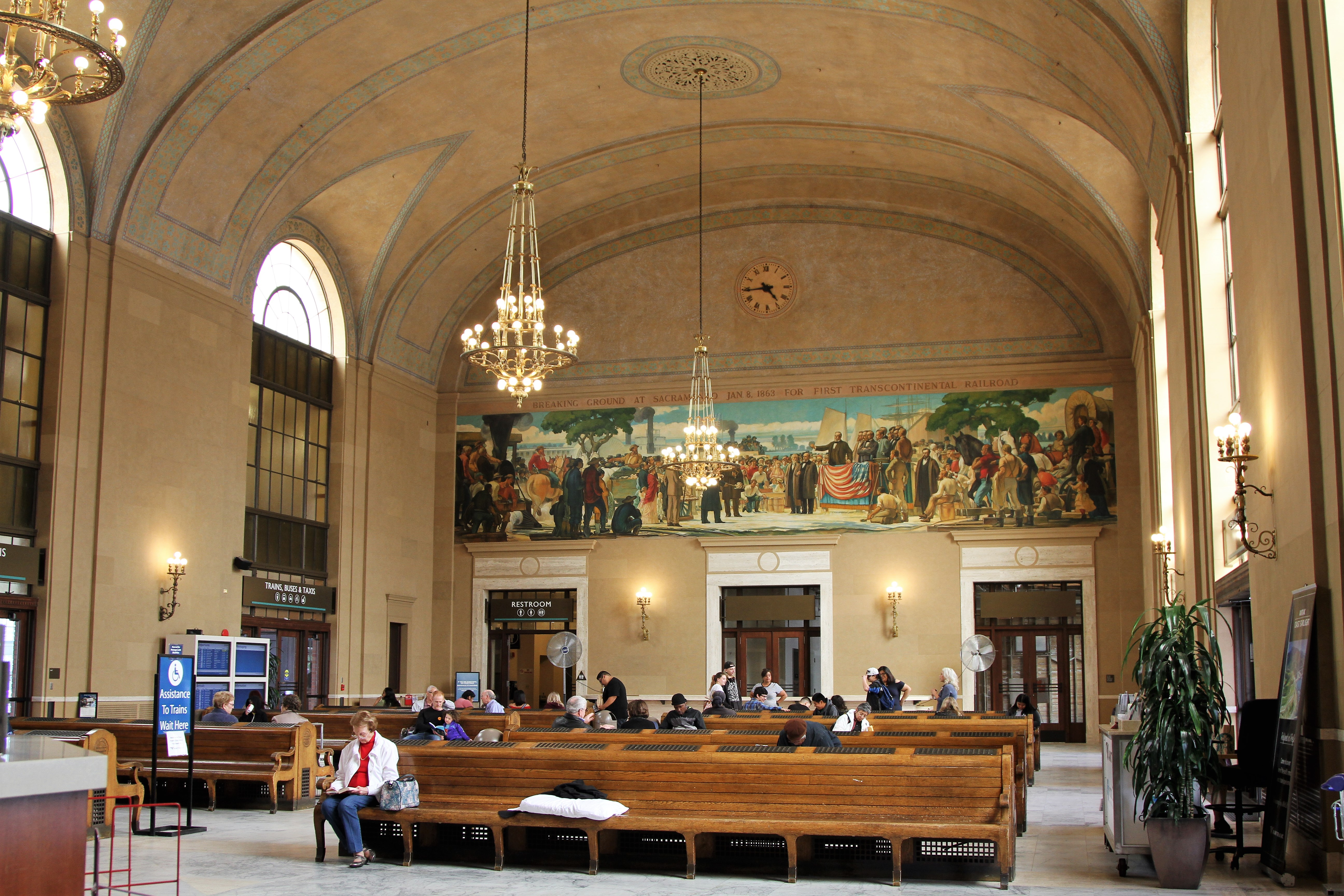
Interior of the waiting hall.

The original Sacramento station was the terminal of the Central Pacific Railroad. The present building, designed by the San Francisco architectural firm of Bliss and Faville for the Southern Pacific Railroad, was built in 1926 on the site of China Slough in the Renaissance Revival style. Decorative features include a red tile roof and terracotta trim, as well as large arches on the main facade. Inside, the waiting room has a mural by artist John A. MacQuarrie that depicts the celebration of the groundbreaking for the First transcontinental railroad on January 8, 1863, in Sacramento. The Central Pacific started from Sacramento and built east to Promontory Summit, Utah, where it met the Union Pacific Railroad. The station is now owned by the City of Sacramento. With the creation of Amtrak on May 1, 1971, the station became Amtrak-only. The station was listed on the National Register of Historic Places in 1975 as "Southern Pacific Railroad Company's Sacramento Depot".

For most of Amtrak's first two decades, the only trains calling at Sacramento were long-distance routes. The California Zephyr and its predecessors have served the station from Amtrak's inception; several pre-Amtrak predecessors of the Zephyr stopped in Sacramento from the 1930s onward. The Coast Starlight arrived in 1982. From 1981, the Spirit of California ran as a sleeper to Los Angeles along the far southern leg of the Coast Starlight route. Service expanded dramatically in 1991 with the introduction of the Capitols service, now the Capitol Corridor. Partly due to its success, it is now the second-busiest station in the Western United States, behind only Los Angeles Union Station, and the seventh-busiest station overall.

The Sacramento Regional Transit Gold Line service was extended 0.5 miles (0.80 km) to Sacramento Valley Station on December 8, 2006.

=== Renovation and Railyards project ===
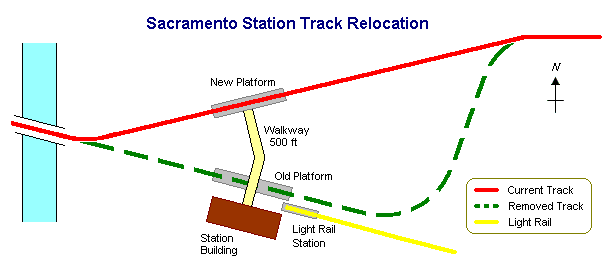
Map of the track relocation project

The City of Sacramento, in conjunction with the Sacramento Railyards Project, is undertaking an extensive multi-stage renovation project.

The first stage, called the Sacramento Valley Station Intermodal Phase I, was completed on August 13, 2012, with the complete relocation of all heavy-rail passenger platforms (Amtrak) approximately 1,000 feet (300 m) further north from their previous location. Sacramento Regional Transit Gold Line light rail operations remain in their original location directly behind the station depot.

The second stage, called the Sacramento Valley Station Intermodal Phase II, was extensive work performed on the station depot building itself. This work included long-deferred retrofitting and structural repair, window replacement, accessible accessibility work, Life Safety fire code work including the outward opening of emergency exit doors and panic hardware installation, and both appearance and comfort rehabilitation to make the station better serve the public. As a result, the station interior was full of scaffolding to facilitate the work being undertaken, causing the passenger waiting space to be visibly confined throughout the duration of the renovation. The work also saw the complete relocation of the Amtrak ticket and baggage offices from the 1960s era addition on the back side of the waiting room; and the new offices located in the former station restaurant space on the North wing of the station and are more passenger-friendly. The station renovation was officially concluded on February 23, 2017, with a grand re-opening hosted by city officials.

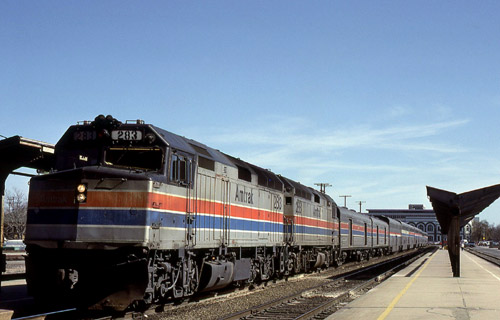
The westbound California Zephyr at Sacramento in February 1985

The third and final stage, called the Sacramento Valley Station Intermodal Phase III, will consist of continued station improvements, including the light rail trackage realignment into a downtown loop, addition of a new bus loop and terminal adjacent to the new platform, and construction of an elevated concourse to replace the current walkway to permanently connect the Railyards development to the north. Additional features will also include new bicycle trails, site preparation for commercial and mixed-residential use surrounding the historic depot, and possible land conversion for the California State Railroad Museum expansion east where parking lots currently exist. This phase is currently still under review, including environmental evaluation and eventual RFPs for construction scheduled in the next 5–10 years.

The city does not plan to immediately vacate the station, but services inside the main Head House building will slowly shift over the coming years as various projects to remodel and retrofit the facility and grounds progress. Eventually, however, the historic Head House will see less use as a transportation facility as the California High Speed Rail Project progresses, and when the planned Sacramento Intermodal Transportation Center is constructed along 5th Street between the Depot and the new platforms, all passenger services will leave and the historic structure will fully be available for use in other roles. The long-term plan also calls for integrating the proposed Sacramento Streetcar project as well as constructing a loop for light rail lines to enable through-running. As of May 2019, the streetcar project has been indefinitely stalled due to rising costs.

== See also ==
- Sacramento station (Western Pacific Railroad) — Former depot in Sacramento, now used for a restaurant
- Sacramento Union Traction Depot — Former interurban railway union station used in California, now demolished
