= Rocklin station =

Train station in Rocklin, California, United States

Rocklin, CA
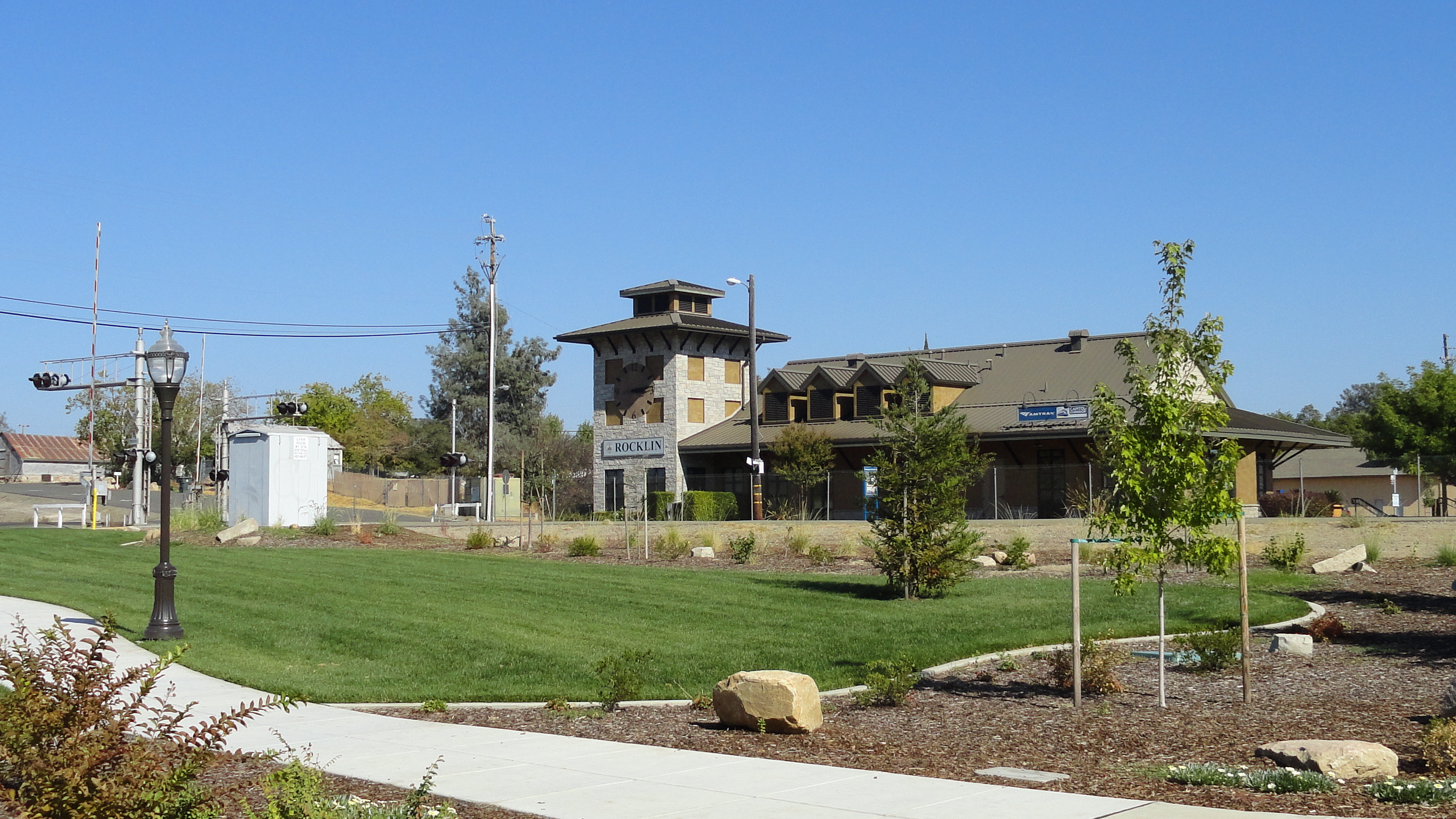
- Rocklin station in October 2012

General information
- Location: Rocklin Road and Railroad Avenue; Rocklin, California; United States
- Coordinates: 38.7911°N 121.2374°W
- Owner: City of Rocklin / Union Pacific
- Line: UP Roseville Subdivision
- Platforms: 2 side platforms
- Tracks: 2
- Connections: Amtrak Thruway: 20

Construction
- Parking: Yes
- Accessible: Yes

Other information
- Station code: Amtrak: RLN

History
- Opened: January 24, 1998
- Rebuilt: 2006

Passengers
- FY 2025: 8,912 (Amtrak)

Services
Preceding station	Amtrak	Following station
Roseville toward San Jose	Capitol Corridor	Auburn Terminus
California Zephyr does not stop here
Location

Rocklin station is an Amtrak California train station in Rocklin, California, United States.

== History ==
Amtrak service began on January 24, 1998. The city and the Placer County Transportation Planning Agency funded the design and construction of the current $1.25 million depot, which opened in July 2006. Designed by Studio SMS of nearby Roseville and inspired by historic 19th and early 20th century stations, the depot is dominated by a clock tower. The building is finished in a random ashlar stone veneer in varying shades of grey and beige and stucco with complementary brown tones.

In 2019 Rocklin was the 52nd-busiest of Amtrak's 73 California stations, boarding or detraining an average of about 47 passengers daily.

As of 2024, reconstruction of the platforms for accessibility is planned to be complete in FY 2025.

== Design ==
The depot has a waiting room for rail and bus passengers, and there are also offices for the Rocklin Area Chamber of Commerce as well as a room reserved for community meetings.

Rocklin station has moveable platforms to accommodate Union Pacific's rotary snowplows, which require clearance of 8 in (20 cm) above the rail.

=== Platforms and tracks ===
Westbound	■ Capitol Corridor	toward San Jose (Roseville)
Westbound	■ California Zephyr	No stops
Eastbound	■ Capitol Corridor	toward Auburn (Terminus)
Eastbound	■ California Zephyr	No stops
