= El Dorado Transit =

Bus transportation provider in El Dorado County, California

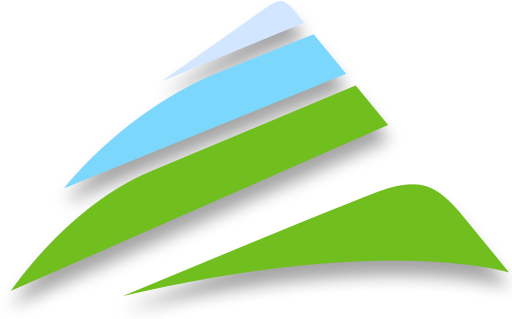

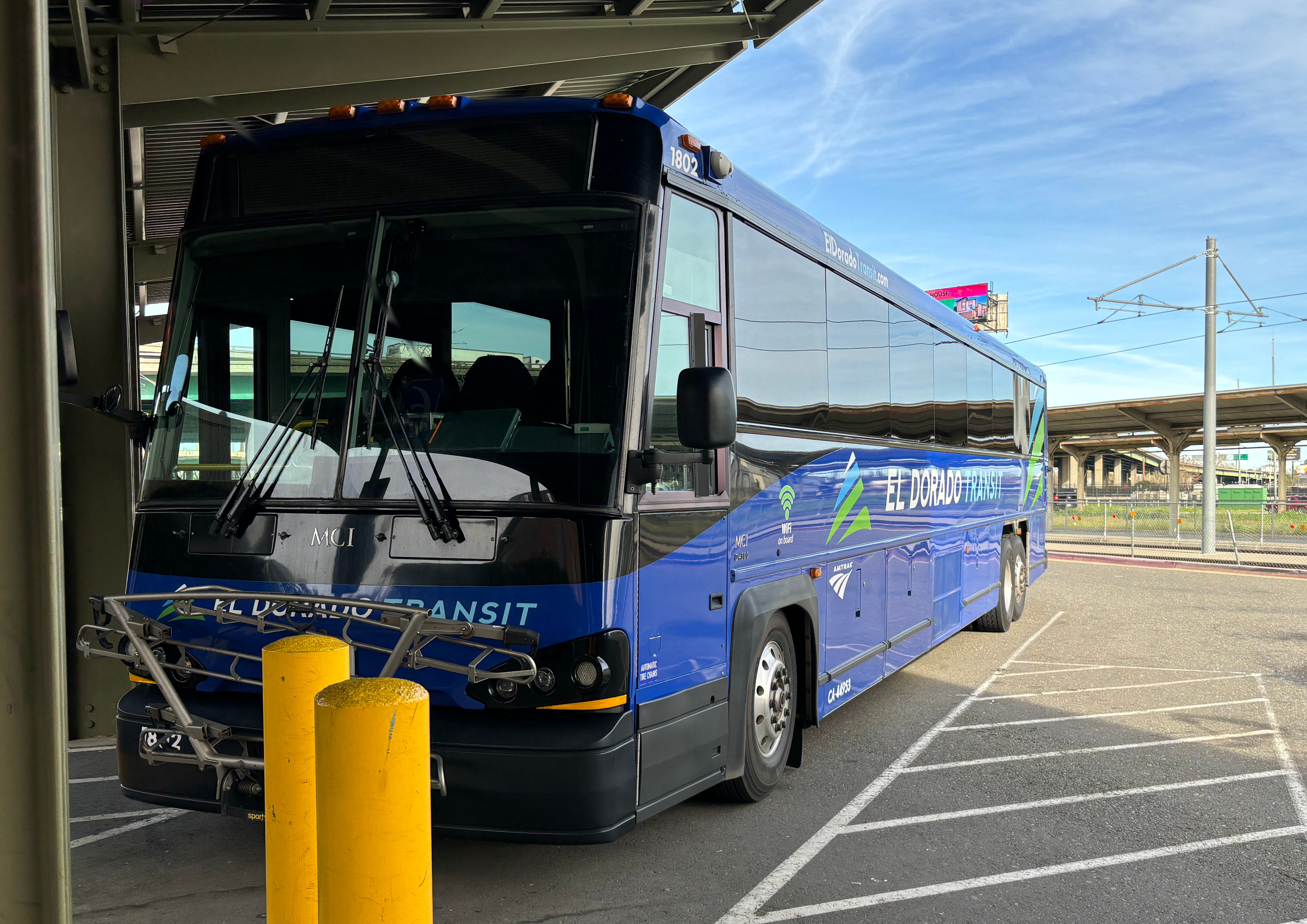
- El Dorado Transit bus in Sacramento
- Parent: El Dorado County Transit Authority
- Founded: 1975
- Headquarters: 6565 Commerce Way; Diamond Spring, California
- Service area: El Dorado County, California
- Service type: Transit bus
- Routes: 9
- Fuel type: Diesel
- Website: eldoradotransit.com

El Dorado Transit is the operator of mass transportation in El Dorado County, California. Service is provided to the highly urbanized corridor of Western Slope suburbs of Sacramento, California. Six local routes are offered, providing weekday service between shopping and business destinations within the county. The commuter routes form the core of the system, running run from Placerville to Downtown Sacramento and offer six park-and-ride options to travelers. Twice daily reverse commuter options also travel from Sacramento to El Dorado County. The 50 Express provides hourly buses travel from Missouri Flat Rd. to and from Red Hawk Casino, Cameron Park, El Dorado Hills, the Sacramento RT Iron Point light rail station, and to Folsom Lake College.

== Routes ==
- 20 Placerville
- 25 Saturday Express
- 30 Diamond Springs/El Dorado
- 35 Diamond Springs/El Dorado (Saturday)
- 40 Cameron Park/Shingle Springs
- 50 Express (Placerville to Folsom), including a connection to light rail at Iron Point Station
- 60 Pollock Pines/Camino
- Sacramento Commuter
- Amtrak Thruway 20C provides a daily connection to Sacramento Valley Station to the west, and South Lake Tahoe to the east.
