= Niles Subdivision =

Railway line in Northern California

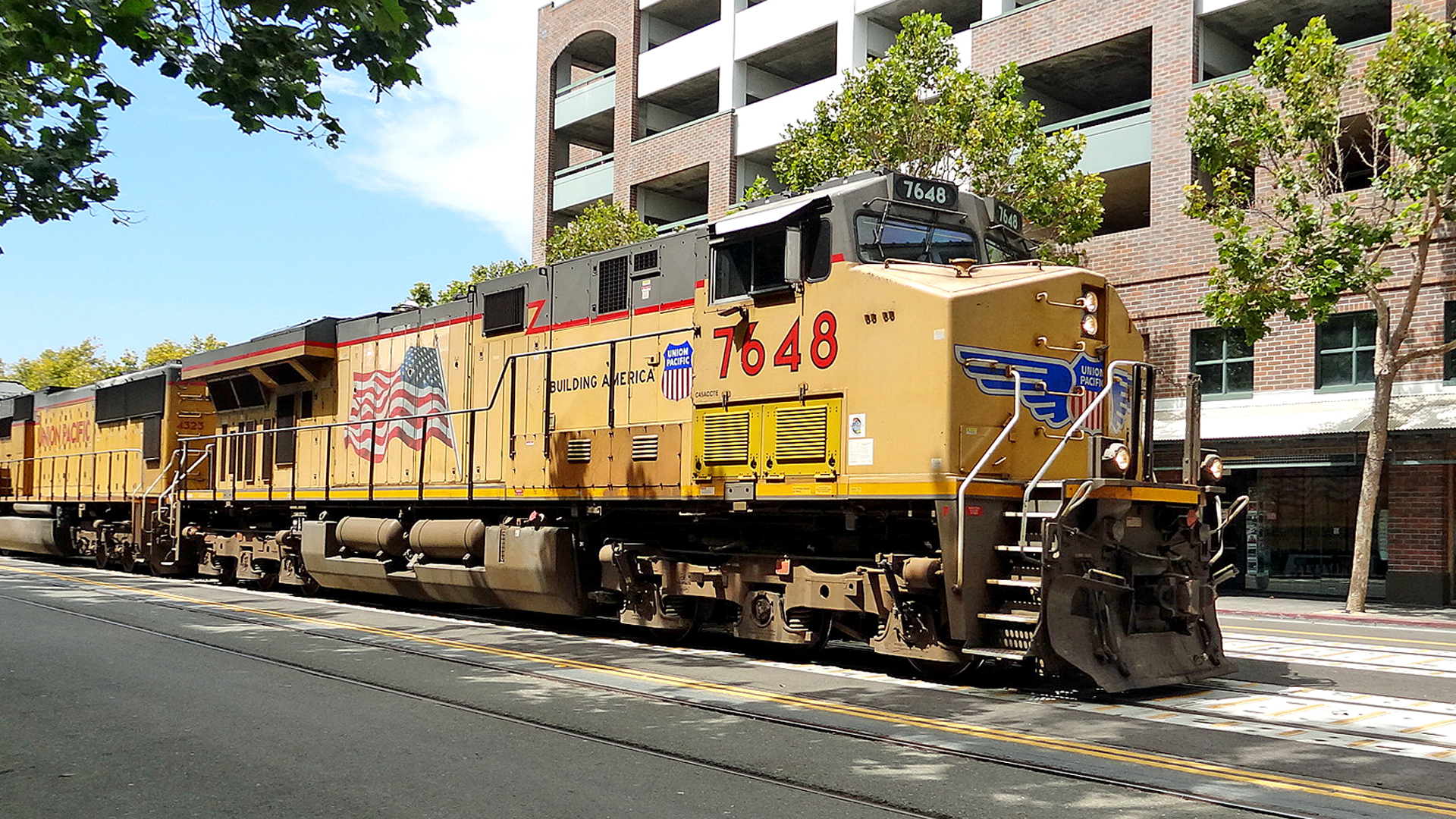
Street running near Jack London Square

The Niles Subdivision is a Union Pacific railway line in Northern California that runs from Oakland, California to Newark, California in the East Bay.

== Route ==
The line largely consists of the original Western Pacific East Bay main line between Oakland and Niles. The line between Newark and Fremont was originally laid out by the South Pacific Coast Railroad. The line features a street running section along Embarcadero in Oakland.

== Traffic ==
Freight movements are consolidated with the parallel Oakland Subdivision. As of 2003 the line saw 17 freight trains daily.

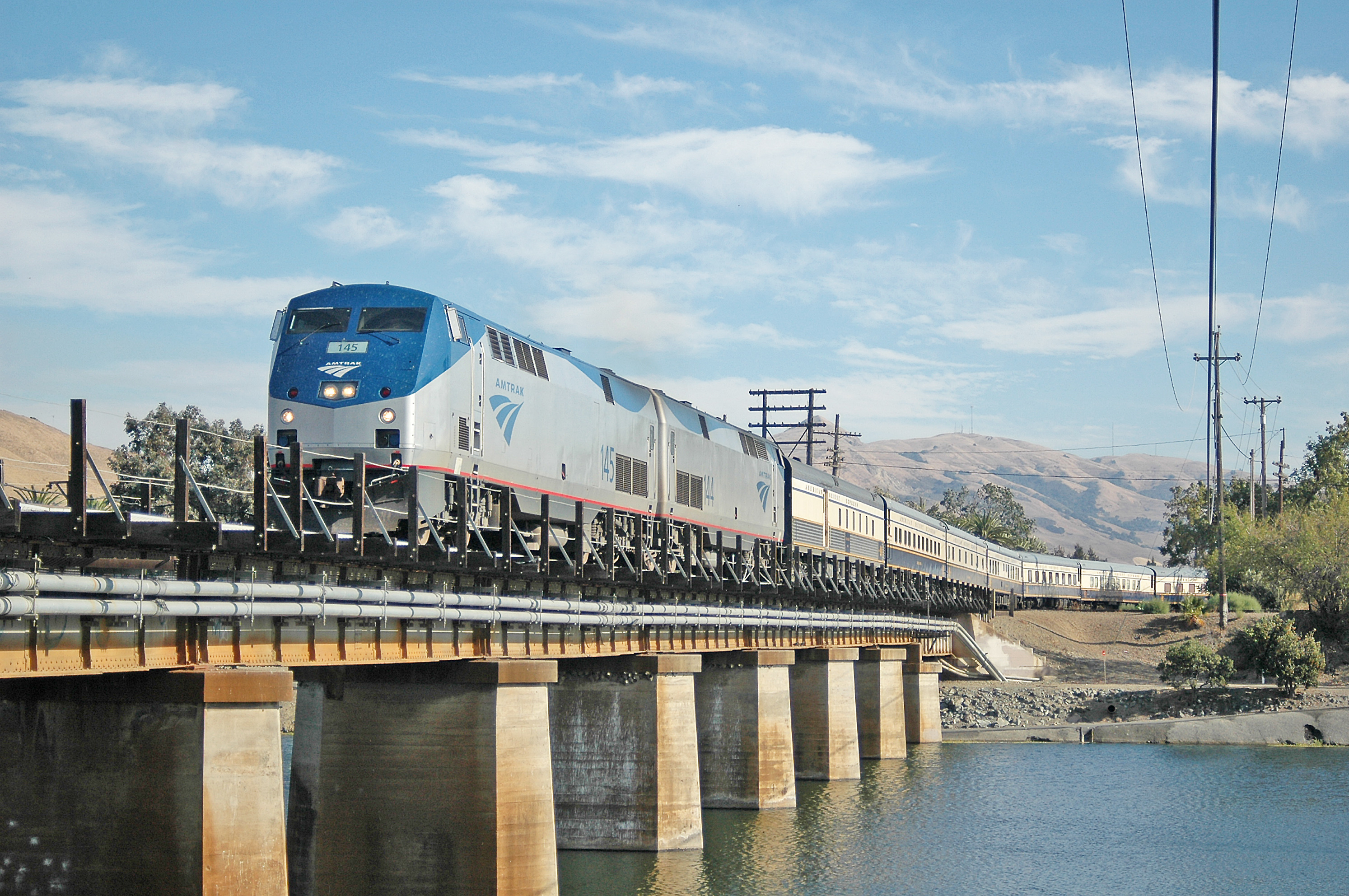
Charter train crossing Alameda Creek, October 2005

The Niles Subdivision also hosts several passenger trains. Amtrak operates the Coast Starlight and Capitol Corridor along the route, and the Gold Runner terminates at the northern segment of the line. The Altamont Corridor Express runs over the southern segment between Newark and Fremont. Fourteen daily passenger trains run over the line.

== History ==
After the Western Pacific Railroad acquired the San Francisco and Oakland Railroad and selected it as the western end of the transcontinental route, they organized a new company to connect the line to its bay approach at Niles. Surveyors were placed in the field early in 1869. A trial line was run over the hill from Dublin to Hayward, but a few days surveying showed there was no advantage in such a cut-off in preference to the Niles Canyon route. Construction was begun near Niles in June and by August a temporary connection had been made at San Leandro with the San Francisco and Alameda Railroad. It was over this connection, via Melrose, that the first transcontinental train ran on September 6, 1869.

Construction commenced on the connection between Melrose and the Oakland "local line" at East Oakland. The last rail was laid on this section October 28, 1869, and that morning the locomotive Reindeer took a construction train through Oakland along 7th Street to the wharf at Oakland Point. There was much rejoicing on November 8; the first through overland train started running that day and Oakland became the terminus of the transcontinental line. Arrival of the railroad immediately began to show its effect on Oakland's businesses and industries. Broadway suddenly became a busy thoroughfare.

On May 15, 1870, the section of the road between San Leandro and Melrose was opened for traffic. This completed the main line to Oakland. Properties of the San Francisco and Oakland Railroad and the San Francisco and Alameda Railroad had been operated under the management of the Central Pacific since 1869, and the following year these companies, together with the Western Pacific, San Joaquin Valley Railroad, and California and Oregon Railroad, consolidated to form the new Central Pacific. The last section of line in Oakland was built in 1870 when a bypass was opened between East Oakland and the wharf via 1st Street.

The segment between Newark and Centerville (in Fremont) was opened as a narrow gauge branch line of the South Pacific Coast Railroad. It was established as a horsecar line in February 1882 and converted to steam operation and standard gauge with the rest of the South Pacific Coast in 1909.
