= Sacramento station (Western Pacific Railroad) =

Former train stop

Sacramento
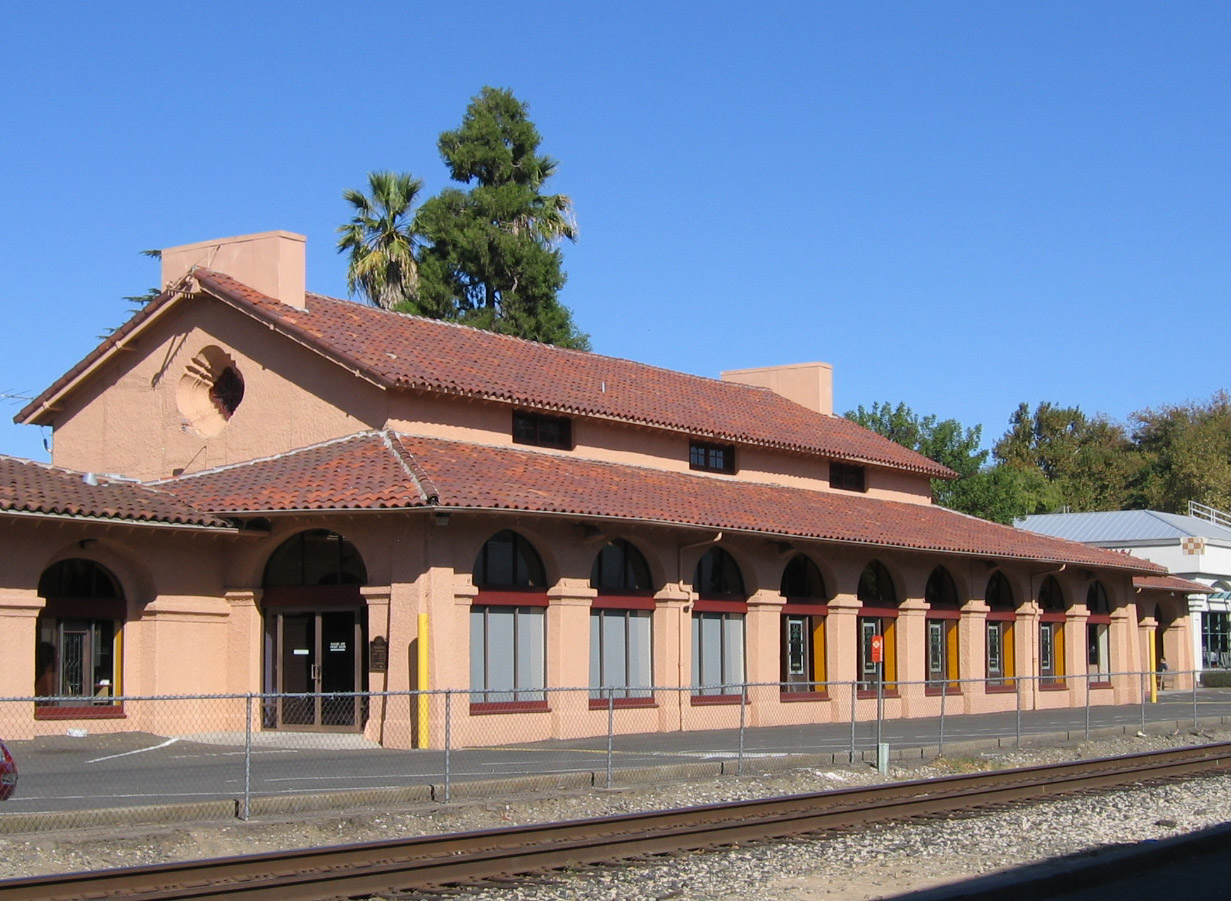
- The former station building in 2006

General information
- Location: 1910 J Street; Sacramento, California
- Coordinates: 38.576458°N 121.480760°W
- Line: Feather River Route

History
- Opened: 1910
- Closed: 1970

Services
Preceding station	Western Pacific Railroad	Following station
Stockton toward Oakland	California Zephyr	Marysville toward Chicago
Sacramento 11th and I street toward Oakland	Feather River Route	Globe toward Salt Lake City
Location

Sacramento station is a former railway station in Sacramento, California, located at 19th and J Streets. Opened in 1910 by the Western Pacific Railroad as part of the Feather River Route, the station would go on to serve the original California Zephyr until the service was discontinued in 1970. The Old Spaghetti Factory opened in the old building in 1978.

The station building was designed by Willis Polk in the Mission Revival style.

A new train station on the same line is planned to open a few blocks south of the historic depot. As of 2023, the new station is projected to open in 2026.

== See also ==
- Sacramento Union Traction Depot – former interurban depot served by WP subsidiary, Sacramento Northern Railway
