= Auburn station (California) =

Amtrak station in Auburn, California, United States

Auburn, CA
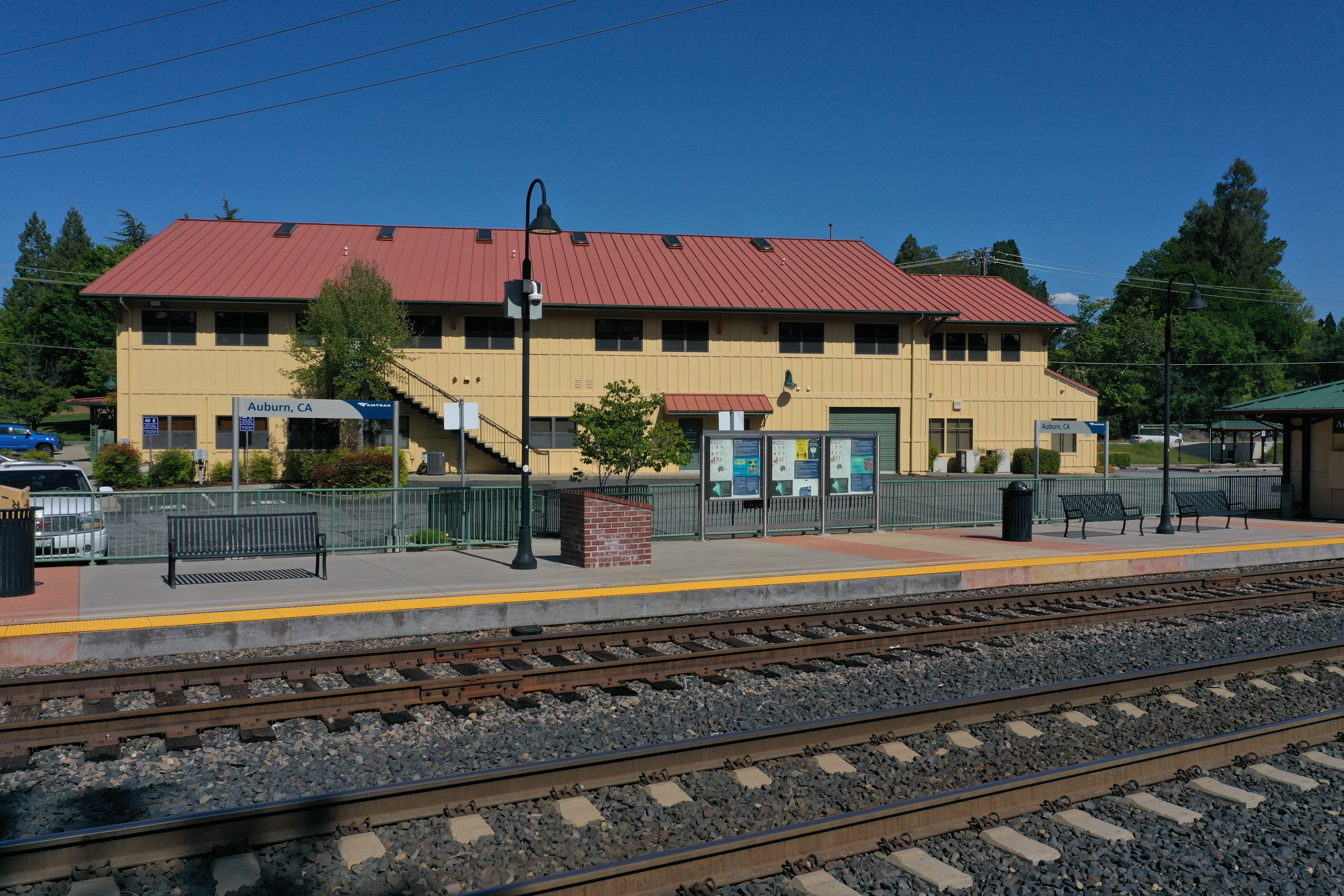
- Auburn station in April 2022

General information
- Other names: Auburn/Conheim; Robert F. Conheim Auburn Train Station
- Location: 277 Nevada Street; Auburn, California; United States
- Coordinates: 38.903725°N 121.083353°W
- Line: UP Roseville Subdivision
- Platforms: 1 side platform
- Tracks: 2
- Connections: Amtrak Thruway: 20; Auburn Transit: Auburn Loop; Gold Country Stage: 5; Placer County Transit: 10, 30, 40

Construction
- Accessible: Yes

Other information
- Station code: Amtrak: ARN

History
- Opened: May 13, 1865; January 26, 1998
- Original company: Central Pacific Railroad

Passengers
- FY 2025: 9,348 (Amtrak)

Services
Preceding station	Amtrak	Following station
Rocklin toward San Jose	Capitol Corridor	Terminus
California Zephyr does not stop here
Former services
Preceding station	Southern Pacific Railroad	Following station
Newcastle toward Oakland Pier	Overland Route	Bowman toward Ogden
Location

Auburn station is an Amtrak train station in Auburn, California. It is served by one daily Capitol Corridor round trip; it is the eastern terminus of that service. The station is also served by two Amtrak Thruway routes – one between the station and Sacramento and one between Sacramento and Sparks, Nevada.

The station has a single side platform served by a siding track off Track 2 of Union Pacific Railroad's route over Donner Pass. Because of the geography of the city, the Union Pacific's mainline tracks are split, with Track 1 running through the eastern side of the city and Track 2 crossing the western side of the city.

Auburn station opened in January 1998. In March 2008, the station (formerly Auburn Multimodal Station) was renamed Robert F. Conheim Auburn Train Station after a long-time Auburn rail rider, who died the previous year.
