= Bangor Transportation Center =

Coordinates: 44°49′00″N 68°48′31″W

The Bangor Transportation Center is a bus terminus in Bangor, Maine served by Concord Trailways. It is located at 1039 Union Street, across the street from the Bangor International Airport. Through ticketing is available from Amtrak's Boston North Station and Portland Transportation Center; Bangor's Amtrak code is BAN.
