= Merced County Transit =

Merced County Transit ("The Bus")

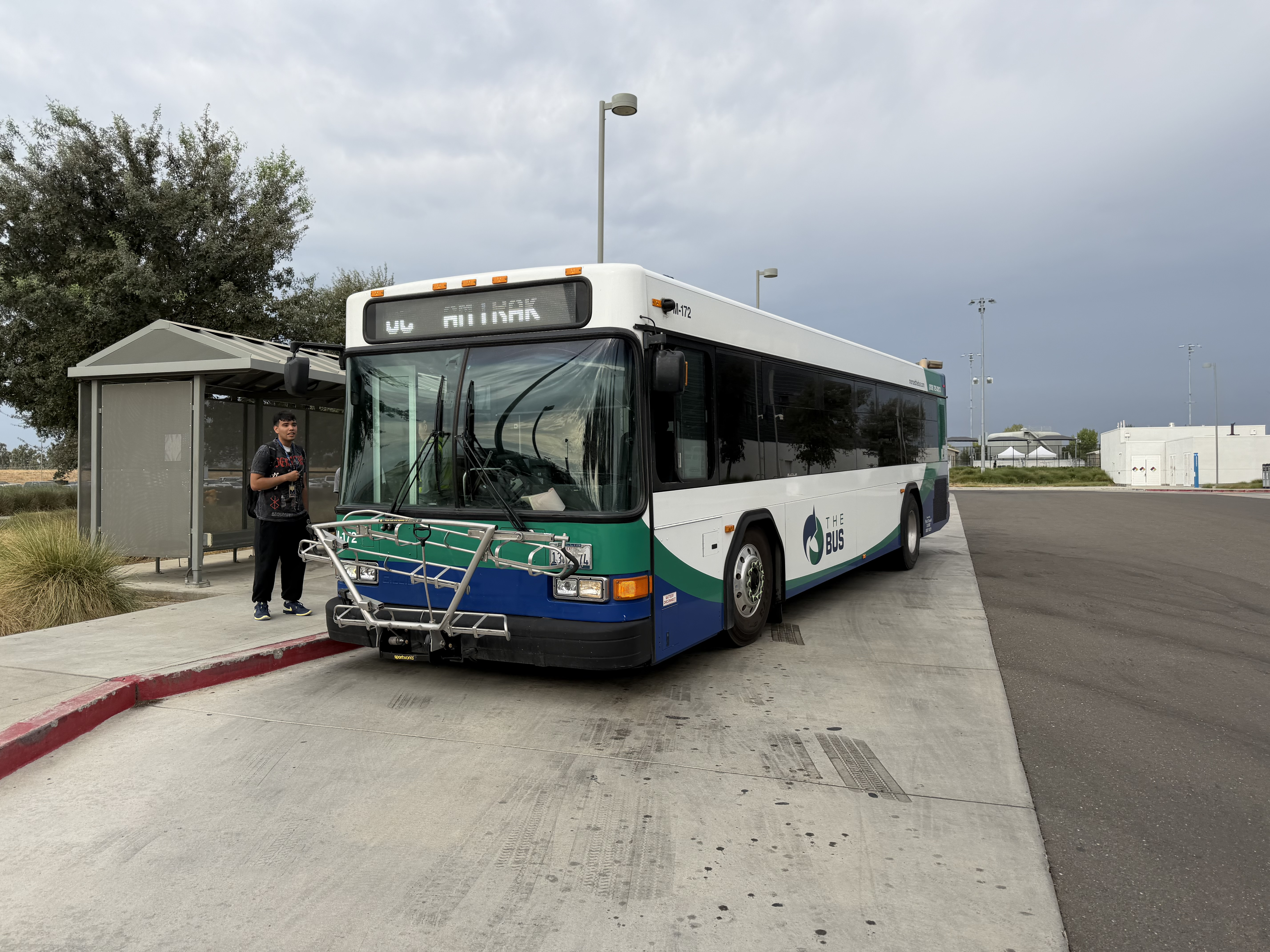
- Merced County Transit bus at the UC Merced transit center
- Parent: Transit Joint Powers Authority of Merced County
- Founded: 1996
- Headquarters: 1950 Wardrobe Ave; Merced, CA 95340
- Service area: Merced County, California
- Service type: Bus service, Dial-a-Ride Microtransit
- Routes: 15
- Stops: 238
- Hubs: Downtown Transportation Center (Transpo), North Merced Transit Center (M Street)
- Fleet: Gillig Low Floor, New Flyer XE40, Ford Starcraft, Chevrolet Starcraft, Turtle Top Terra Transit, Dodge Grand Caravan
- Annual ridership: 1,000,000
- Fuel type: Gasoline, Diesel, Battery Electric
- Operator: Transdev
- Website: /www.mercedthebus.com/

Merced County Transit, also known as "The Bus", provides public bus transportation services throughout Merced County in the Central Valley and San Joaquin Valley areas of California. Vehicles are owned and maintained by Transit Joint Powers Authority of Merced County with daily operations conducted by a private contractor, Transdev as of May 2020.

== History ==
The Bus was formed in 1996 by consolidating four local transit service providers.

== Merced Transportation Center ==
Located in the former Southern Pacific railway station at 16th and O Streets in Merced, the downtown transportation center (Transpo Center) serves as the hub for Merced's local, regional and national bus service. Greyhound provides bus service to Sacramento, the Bay Area, and Los Angeles. YARTS and VIA Adventures provide bus service to Yosemite National Park. Situated at the same location, the California Welcome Center carries souvenirs, maps, and brochures for visitors, as well as YARTS bus tickets.

Another transportation center for North Merced was recently constructed on M Street near Bellevue Road which is intended to serve as a park and ride lot for UC Merced students, staff, and visitors to easily connect with The Bus and UC Merced shuttle bus services.

== Fleet ==
The fleet consists of transit buses, cutaway buses, and vans. The fixed-route fleet primarily consists of Gillig Low Floor buses which range in size from 29' to 40', with most being 35', and both New Flyer XE40 and Gillig battery electric buses which are 35' and 40' in length. Another set of smaller cutaway buses and vans are primarily used to provide ADA paratransit service throughout the county and microtransit service in the city of Los Banos and the westside of the county.

The agency began the greening of their fleet in 2006 with the purchase of 9 "clean air" Orion VII models and planned the construction of a compressed natural gas fueling facility. In late 2019 and early 2020, The Bus was awarded grants to help begin the transition towards a zero-emission fleet. The first set of five 40' New Flyer XE40 battery electric buses arrived in late June 2023 and began service in early November 2023, and the second wave of four Gillig battery electric buses arrived in late September 2024 and began service in February 2025. The agency is also exploring other zero-emission bus options, including a pilot program for a hydrogen fuel cell powered bus, for future services to be on track to have a fully zero-emission fleet by 2041 in accordance to state guidelines.

== Services ==
Merced operates 15 fixed bus routes and 2 on-demand services are provided 7 days a week (with the exception of the UC route which operates Monday through Friday only) operate within the city of Merced and throughout the county, as well as to the city of Turlock in neighboring Stanislaus County. However, the unincorporated community of Hilmar-Irwin which has a combined population of over 5,000 does not to have any of The Bus services, even though it is located within Merced County, along with the town of Snelling.

Rte. no.	Route description	Destinations
Current routes and services as of January 2025
A1	Atwater Cross-Town	Bellevue Rd, Winton Way, Broadway, Buhach Rd, Castle Air Force Base, Atwater Target
A2	Winton Way	Connects Atwater and the town of Winton via Winton Way Planned to be replaced with Micro Transit service in 2025
L	Livingston Commuter	Connects Livingston with Winton, Atwater, and Merced College (Merced)
LB	Los Banos Commuter	Los Banos-Dos Palos-Downtown Merced
M1	Merced West	Southwest Merced-Downtown-Merced Marketplace-Northwest Merced via Highway 59
M2	R Street Route	Downtown-Merced Mall-Merced Marketplace via R Street
M3	M Street Route	South Merced-Downtown-Merced Mall-Merced College-via M Street
M4	G Street North Route	Downtown-Merced College-Mercy Hospital-Bellevue Ranch-via G Street
M5	Merced Southeast	Southeast Merced-Amtrak-Downtown-via Childs Ave & 21st St.
M6	Merced Northeast	Downtown Merced-G Street-Hoover Middle School-Save Mart
M7	G Street South Route	Downtown Merced-Fairgrounds-Rescue Mission-via G Street
P	Planada Commuter	Le Grand-Planada-Downtown Merced
T	Turlock Commuter	Turlock-CSU Stanislaus-Delhi-Livingston-Atwater-Downtown Merced via Highway 99
UC	UC Route	Downtown Merced-Amtrak-Merced College-UC Merced-via M Street and Yosemite Ave.
W1	Winton Commuter	Winton, Atwater(Bellevue Rd), Buhach, Beachwood-Franklin, Downtown Merced
The Micro Bus		Westside on-demand service for both ADA and general passengers within the Los Banos, Dos Palos, Santa Nella, and Gustine communities with expansion to the Merced, Atwater, and Winton communities planned in the near future
ADA Paratransit		On-demand dial-a-ride service throughout the county exclusively for Seniors and ADA eligible passengers which provides service within a 3/4 mile radius of existing fixed route service areas
