= Amtrak Thruway =

Connecting transportation services brand

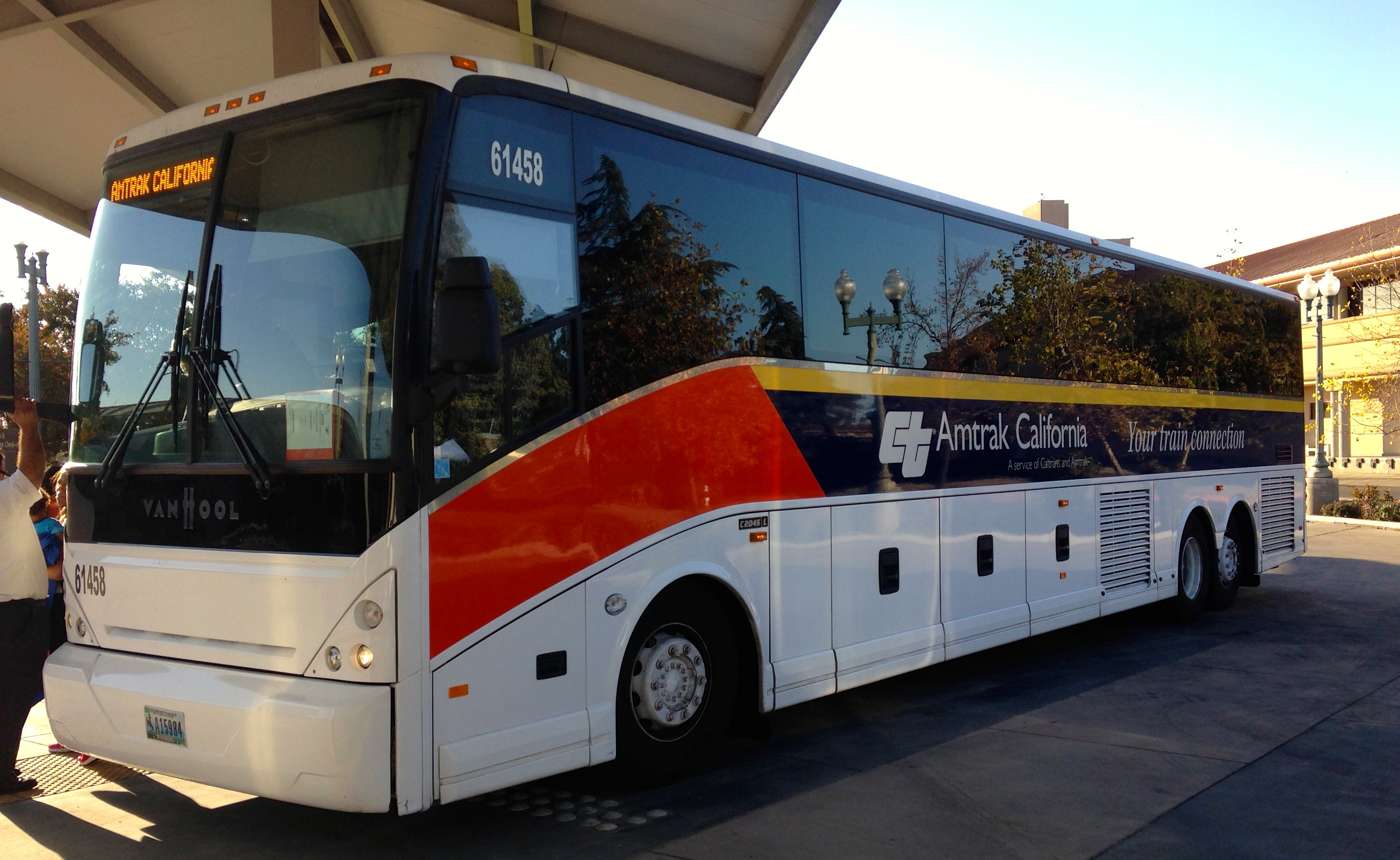
A Van Hool C2045L Amtrak California Motorcoach at the Bakersfield station

Amtrak Thruway is the former name of Amtrak's bus transportation services to connect passengers with areas not served by Amtrak trains. (Amtrak now refers to these services as Amtrak Connection.) In most cases these are motorcoach routes, but can also use other vehicles.

Amtrak also sells interline tickets on non-dedicated intercity bus services, transit buses, vans, taxis, ferry boats and commuter rail trains, but these are not sold under the Amtrak Connection name.

Train and connecting tickets are typically purchased together from Amtrak for the length of a passenger's journey and connections are timed for guaranteed transfers between the two services.

== History and purpose ==
Amtrak operates connecting services to extend the reach of its train services, offering connections to destinations not directly served by Amtrak trains. The earliest incarnation was launched in January 1973, to provide a connection between Amtrak's Inter-American in Laredo, Texas, and the Aztec Eagle train run by N de M from Nuevo Laredo, Mexico. The following year, Amtrak launched an agreement with Greyhound allowing for passengers to buy combined bus and rail tickets for connecting services run by the two companies. These services were the predecessors of Thruway Motorcoach. The first Amtrak bus service to bear the name "Amtrak Thruway" was launched in California in 1993. Amtrak launched a significant expansion of connecting services across the United States in 2014.

== Routes ==
=== Northeast ===
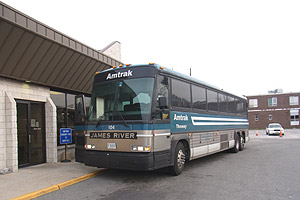
Amtrak Motorcoach at Newport News station, January 2013

- Boston – Manchester (Boston Express)
- Boston – Concord – Berlin, NH (through-ticketed Concord Coach Lines route)
- Boston – Concord – Littleton, NH (through-ticketed Concord Coach Lines route)
- Boston – Newburyport, MA – Portsmouth, NH (through-ticketed C&J route)
- New Bedford, MA – Providence
- New London, CT – Foxwoods Casino (through-ticketed SEAT route)
- Philadelphia – Atlantic City (through-ticketed NJ Transit Atlantic City Line rail route)
- Philadelphia – Pottstown/Reading, Pennsylvania (service provided by Krapf Coaches). Discontinued March 18, 2025.
- Philadelphia – Quakertown/Allentown/White Haven/Wilkes-Barre/Scranton, Pennsylvania (service provided by Martz Trailways)
- Washington, D.C. – Charlottesville, Virginia (through-ticketed Greyhound route)
- BWI Airport – Kent Island/Easton/Cambridge/Salisbury/Ocean Pines/Ocean City, Maryland (operated by BayRunner Shuttle)
- BWI Airport – Frederick/Hagerstown/Cumberland/Grantsville, Maryland (operated by BayRunner Shuttle)
- Portland, ME – Bangor (through-ticketed Concord Coach Lines route)
- Buffalo – Jamestown, NY (through-ticketed Coach USA Erie route)
- Worcester, MA – Providence, RI

=== East ===
- Westport, New York, to Lake Placid, New York (operated by Ground Force 1)
- Killington to Rutland (Gramps Shuttle)
- DeLand, Florida, to Daytona Beach (thruway service is a taxicab provided by Tri Star Taxi)
- Orlando/Tampa to St. Petersburg/Fort Myers, Florida (operated by Martz First Class)
- Wilson, North Carolina, to numerous cities in eastern North Carolina (Greenville, New Bern, Havelock, Morehead City, Goldsboro, Kinston, Jacksonville, and Wilmington) (through ticketed motorcoach operated by Southeastern Tours of Greenville).
- Charlottesville to Richmond, Virginia (operated by Academy Bus Express)
- High Point, North Carolina, to Winston-Salem (operated by Piedmont Authority for Regional Transportation)
- Meridian, Mississippi, to Dallas (through-ticketed Greyhound route)
- Harrisburg to Williamsport, Pennsylvania (through-ticketed Fullington Trailways route)
- Pittsburgh to State College, Pennsylvania (through-ticketed Fullington Trailways route)
- Pittsburgh to Columbus/Dayton, Ohio/Indianapolis, Indiana (through-ticketed Greyhound route)
- Charleston, West Virginia, to numerous cities in northern West Virginia (Sutton/Flatwoods, Weston, Clarksburg, Fairmont & Morgantown) (operated by Barons Bus Lines)

=== Midwest ===
- Toledo, Ohio, to East Lansing, Michigan, via Detroit and Ann Arbor, Michigan (Trinity Transportation)
- Battle Creek, Michigan, to Flint (through-ticketed Indian Trails route)
- Kalamazoo, Michigan, to St. Ignace (through-ticketed Indian Trails route)
- Kalamazoo, Michigan to Grand Rapids (through-ticketed Indian Trails route)
- Kalamazoo, Michigan to Sault Ste. Marie (through-ticketed Indian Trails route)
- Kalamazoo, Michigan to Gaylord (through-ticketed Indian Trails route)
- Port Huron to Detroit (Hoosier Ride)
- Chicago to Rockford, Illinois/Madison, Wisconsin (through-ticketed Van Galder Bus Company route)
- Indianapolis to Galesburg, Illinois/Davenport, Iowa (through-ticketed Burlington Trailways route)
- Chicago/Indianapolis to Louisville, Kentucky (through-ticketed Greyhound route)
- Carbondale, Illinois, to St. Louis (Vandalia Bus Lines)
- New Orleans to Baton Rouge (Greyhound Lines)
- Kansas City, Missouri, to Oklahoma City via Tulsa (through-ticketed Jefferson Lines route)
- Milwaukee to Oshkosh, Wisconsin/Wausau, Wisconsin (through-ticketed Lamers Bus Lines route)
- Milwaukee to Green Bay, Wisconsin, via Appleton, Oshkosh and Fond du Lac
- Milwaukee to Madison, Wisconsin (Badger Bus)
- Milwaukee to Houghton, Michigan (Indian Trails)
- Milwaukee to Minneapolis/St. Paul via Eau Claire, Wisconsin (Jefferson Lines)
- Galesburg, Illinois, to Springfield, Illinois
- St. Paul-Minneapolis to Duluth, Minnesota (through-ticketed Jefferson Lines route)
- Newton, Kansas, to Oklahoma City via Wichita.
- Toledo, Ohio, to Chicago, Illinois

=== West ===
- Albuquerque to El Paso (through-ticketed Greyhound route)
- Denver to Colorado Springs/Pueblo (through-ticketed Greyhound route)
- Denver to Glenwood Springs, Colorado (through-ticketed Greyhound route)
- Denver to Buffalo, Wyoming (through-ticketed Express Arrow route)
- Flagstaff to Williams/Grand Canyon (through-ticketed Groome route)
- Flagstaff to Phoenix (through-ticketed Groome or Greyhound route)
- Flagstaff to Sedona (through-ticketed Groome route)
- Kingman to Laughlin, NV and Las Vegas, NV (through-ticketed Vegas Airporter route)
- Lamy, New Mexico, to Santa Fe, New Mexico
- Longview, Texas, to Shreveport, Louisiana
- Longview to Houston/Galveston
- Houston to Galveston (through-ticketed Kerrville Bus route)
- Maricopa to Phoenix (through-ticketed Stagecoach Express route)
- Oklahoma City to Kansas City, Missouri, via Tulsa (through-ticketed Jefferson Lines route)
- Raton, New Mexico, to Denver (through-ticketed Greyhound route)
- Salt Lake City to Boise (through-ticketed Greyhound route)
- Salt Lake City to Las Vegas via St. George (through-ticketed Greyhound route)
- San Antonio to Laredo (through-ticketed Greyhound route)
- San Antonio to McAllen (through-ticketed Greyhound route)
- Temple to Killeen/Fort Cavazos

=== Pacific Northwest ===
- Seattle to Vancouver, British Columbia (through-ticketed Cantrail route)
- Seattle to Bellingham (operated by MTR Western)
- Seattle to Vancouver Island/Victoria, British Columbia (through-ticketed Victoria Clipper ferry route)
- Portland to Eugene-Springfield (through-ticketed POINT route)
- Portland to Astoria (through-ticketed POINT route)
- Spokane to Boise (through-ticketed Northwestern Trailways route)
- Seattle to Wenatchee/Spokane (through-ticketed Northwestern Trailways route)
- Seattle to Port Angeles (through-ticketed Travel Washington route)
- Portland to Pendleton/Boise (through-ticketed Greyhound route)
- Portland/Albany to Corvallis/Newport (through-ticketed Valley Retriever route)
- Redmond to Chemult (operated by TAC Transportation)
- Klamath Falls to Brookings (through-ticketed POINT route)
- Eugene to Bend/Ontario (through-ticketed POINT route)
- Eugene to Coos Bay (operated by TAC Transportation)
- Klamath Falls to Ashland

=== California ===
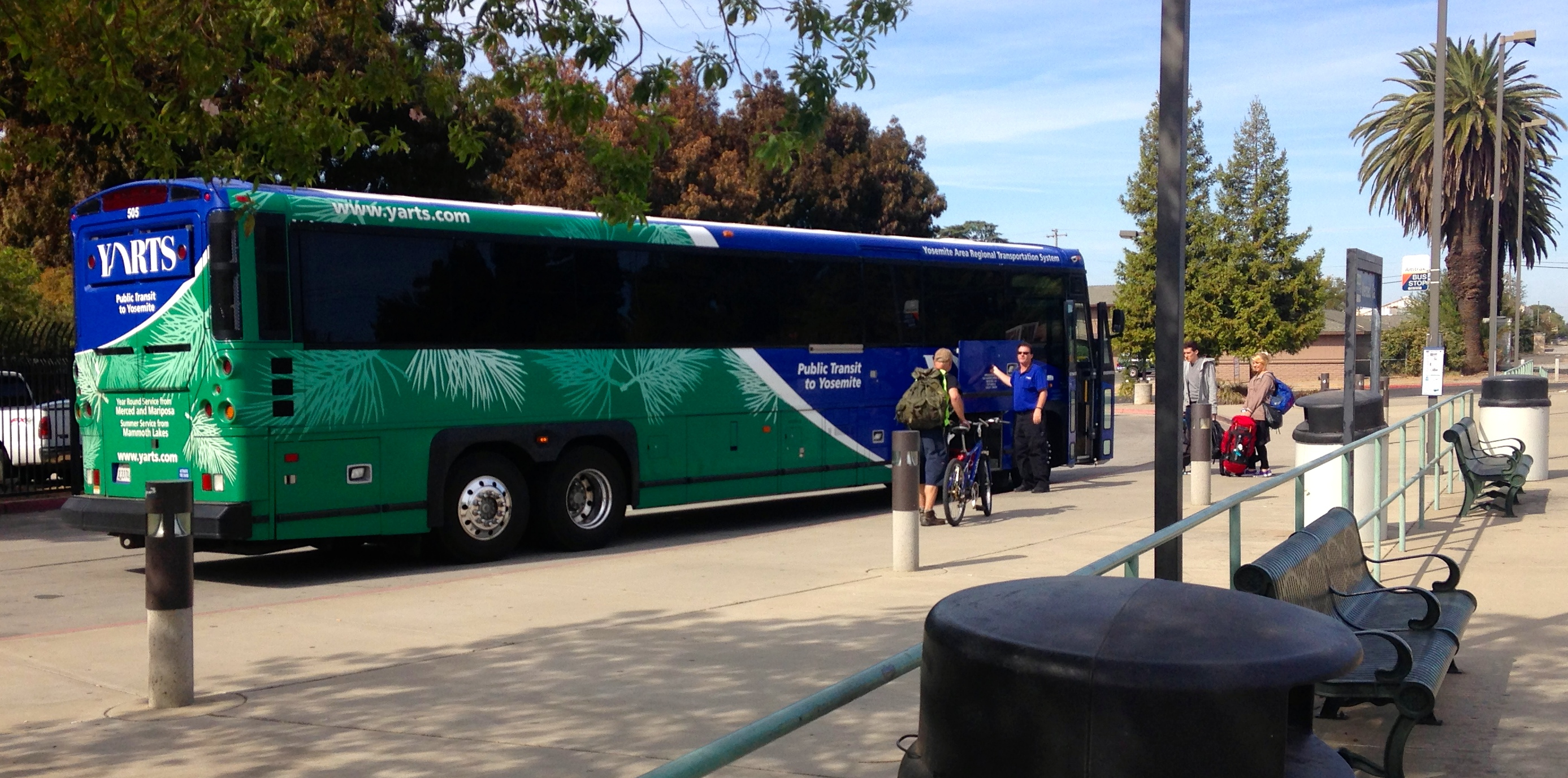
Passengers boarding a YARTS bus at the Merced, California, station operating as Amtrak Thruway route 15A to Yosemite.

- Route 1: Bakersfield – Los Angeles – Santa Ana – San Diego
- Route 1C: Bakersfield – Santa Clarita – Hollywood Burbank Airport – UCLA – Santa Monica
- Route 3: Chico – Davis – Sacramento – Stockton
- Route 5: Redding – Orland – Sacramento International Airport – Sacramento (through-ticketed Redding Area Bus Authority route)
- Route 6: Stockton – San Jose – Santa Cruz (some Stockton – San Jose services operated by Altamont Corridor Express trains, San Jose – Santa Cruz operated as Highway 17 Express by Santa Cruz Metropolitan Transit District)
- Route 7: Martinez – Napa – Santa Rosa – Eureka – Arcata – Cal Poly Humboldt
- Route 10: Santa Barbara – Bakersfield – Las Vegas, Nevada (through-ticketed Alvand Transportation route)
- Route 15A: Merced – Yosemite (through-ticketed Yosemite Area Regional Transportation System route)
- Route 15B: Fresno – Yosemite (through-ticketed Yosemite Area Regional Transportation System route)
- Route 17: Oakland – San Luis Obispo – Santa Barbara
- Route 18: San Luis Obispo – Cal Poly San Luis Obispo – Hanford (seasonal, selected days)
- Route 19: Bakersfield – Pasadena – Riverside – San Bernardino
- Route 20: Sacramento – Colfax – Reno/Sparks, Nevada
- Route 20C: Sacramento – South Lake Tahoe (through-ticketed El Dorado Transit route)
- Route 21: San Jose – San Luis Obispo – Santa Barbara (through-ticketed AmericanStar Trailways route)
- Route 39: Fullerton – Palm Springs – Coachella Valley
- Route 40: San Jose – Gilroy – Los Banos – Merced
- Route 99: Oakland/Emeryville – San Francisco

As a result of a 2019 state law, most Thruway routes in California are available to passengers using only buses without connecting to an Amtrak train.

== See also ==
- Intercity bus service in the United States
