= South Station Bus Terminal =

Bus station in Boston, Massachusetts, US

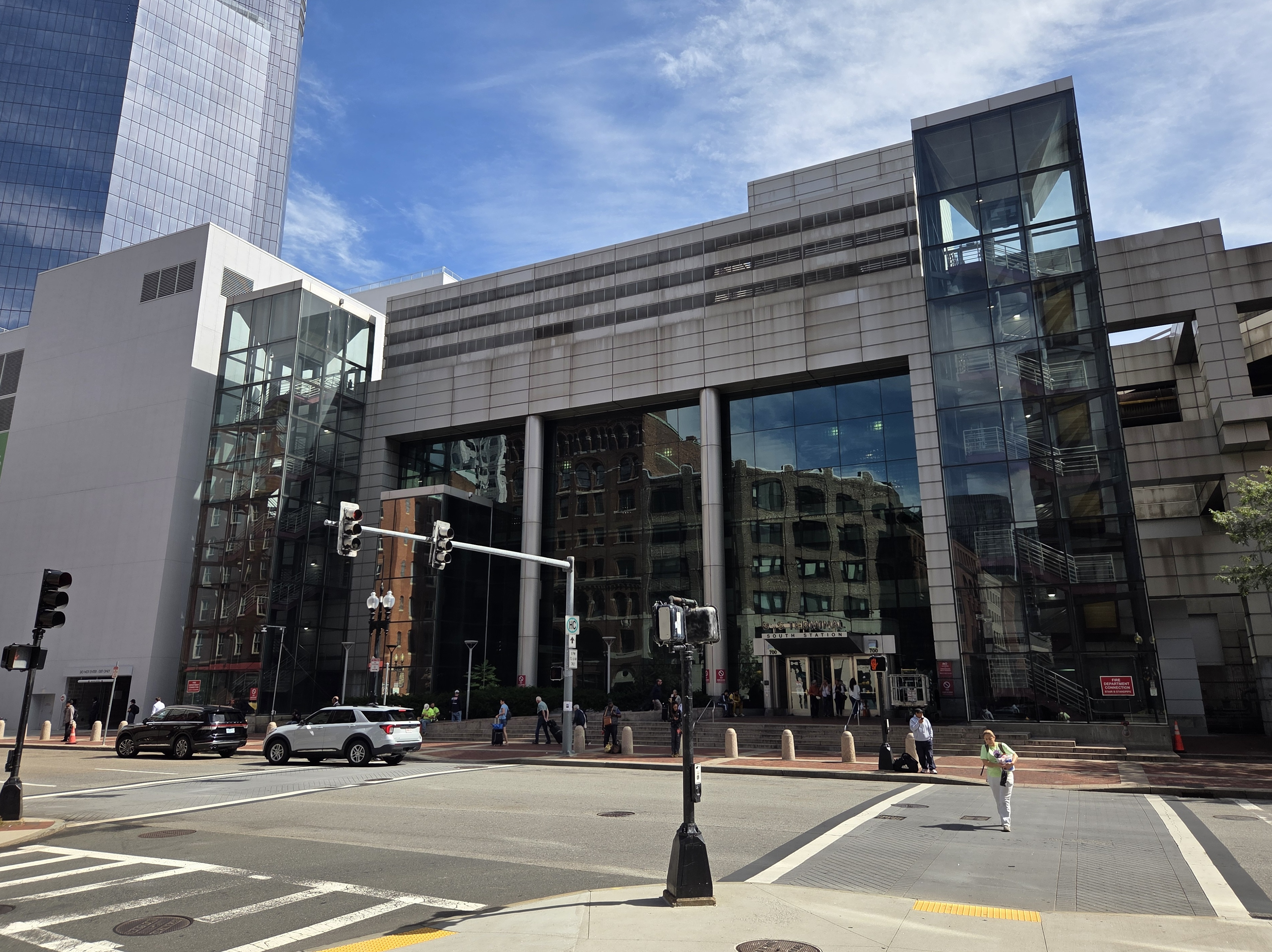
- Main entrance on Atlantic Avenue in 2025

General information
- Location: 700 Atlantic Avenue; Boston, Massachusetts; United States
- Coordinates: 42.35°N 71.0558°W
- Owner: Massachusetts Bay Transportation Authority
- Platforms: 42 bus bays
- Bus operators: 10
- Connections: MBTA Commuter Rail and Amtrak at South Station; Red Line, Silver Line, MBTA bus at South Station (subway)

Construction
- Parking: 225 spaces
- Accessible: Yes

History
- Opened: October 28, 1995
- Rebuilt: 2020–2025

Passengers
- 2025: 10,000 daily boardings and alightings
Location

The South Station Bus Terminal is a bus station located at South Station in downtown Boston, Massachusetts, United States. It is Boston's main terminal for regional commuter bus and intercity bus service, with 42 bus berths used by 10 operators. The industrial-style structure is built on air rights above the South Station rail platforms. It has two full levels – a bus deck and a rooftop parking deck – plus several partial levels. South Station Bus Terminal is owned by the Massachusetts Bay Transportation Authority (MBTA).

Beginning in the late 1950s, city and state agencies proposed a large parking garage with a bus terminal at South Station. It was intended to replace two existing terminals in the Park Square area. The Boston Redevelopment Authority purchased South Station in 1965 with plans to redevelop the site. Planning for the development continued over the following decades. The 1980 and 1981 environmental impact statements proposed a three-level terminal with a concourse deck, bus deck, and parking deck; a later phase would add commercial development on top.

The 1984–1989 reconstruction of South Station added footings to support the air rights project. Final design for the bus terminal was completed in 1990. Due to budget limitations, it had fewer bus berths and parking spaces than previously planned. Construction begin in September 1992 and the terminal opened on October 28, 1995. The ramps to the terminal were reconfigured in 2003–2005 by the Central Artery/Tunnel Project (Big Dig). As part of the South Bay Interchange, a new elevated connector road was built with direct ramps to/from I-93 and the Massachusetts Turnpike.

Expansion of the terminal was added to plan for the commercial air rights development (which became the South Station Tower) before the terminal even opened. Revisions to the plan were released in 1998 and 2002, but the project was delayed by the Great Recession. It was revived in 2016 with further modifications; construction began in January 2020. The expansion opened on November 4, 2025, adding 13 bus berths and a direct connection to the South Station concourse area.

== Design ==
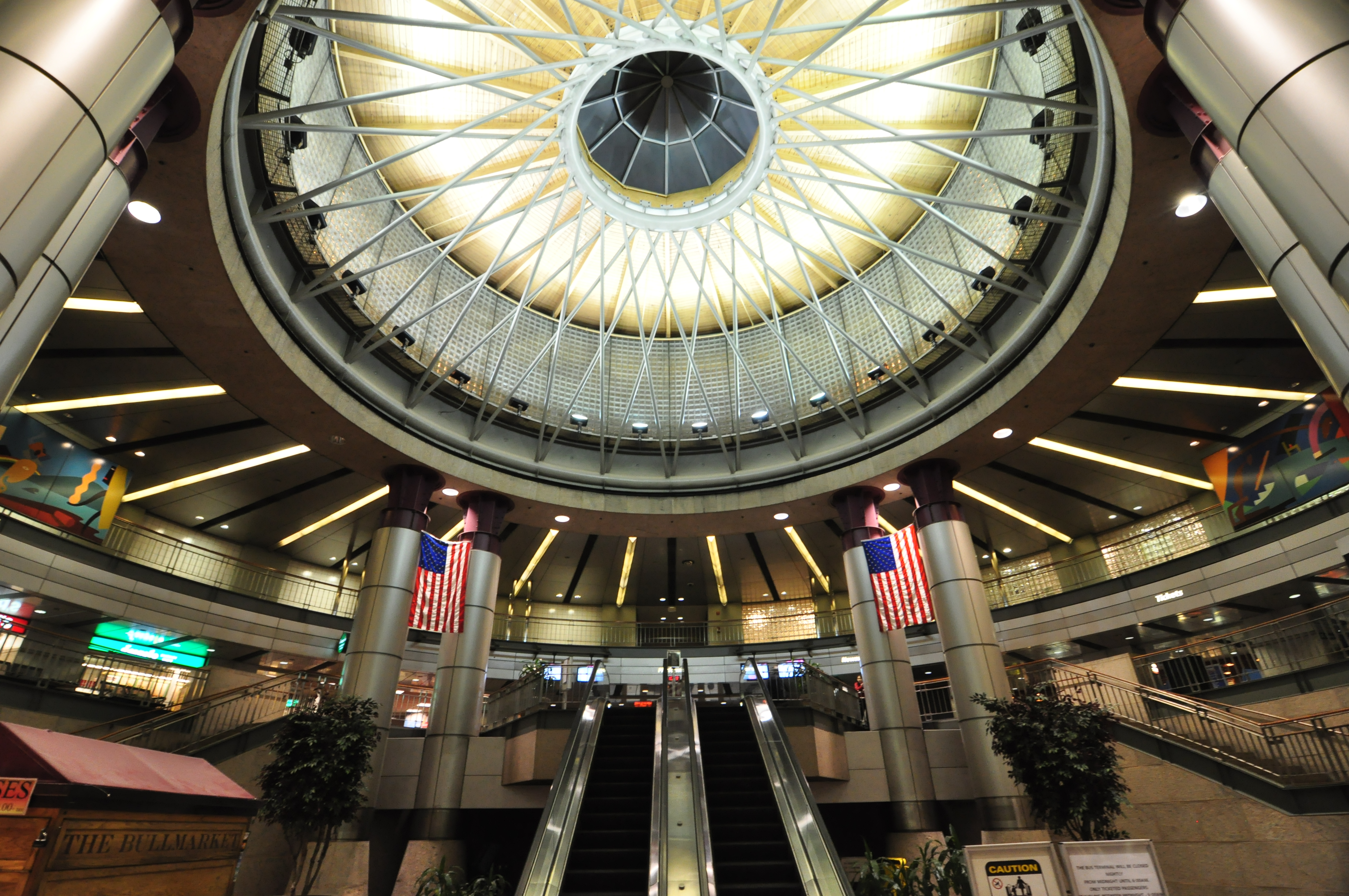
Rotunda and skylight, surrounded by food concessions and ticket sales counters

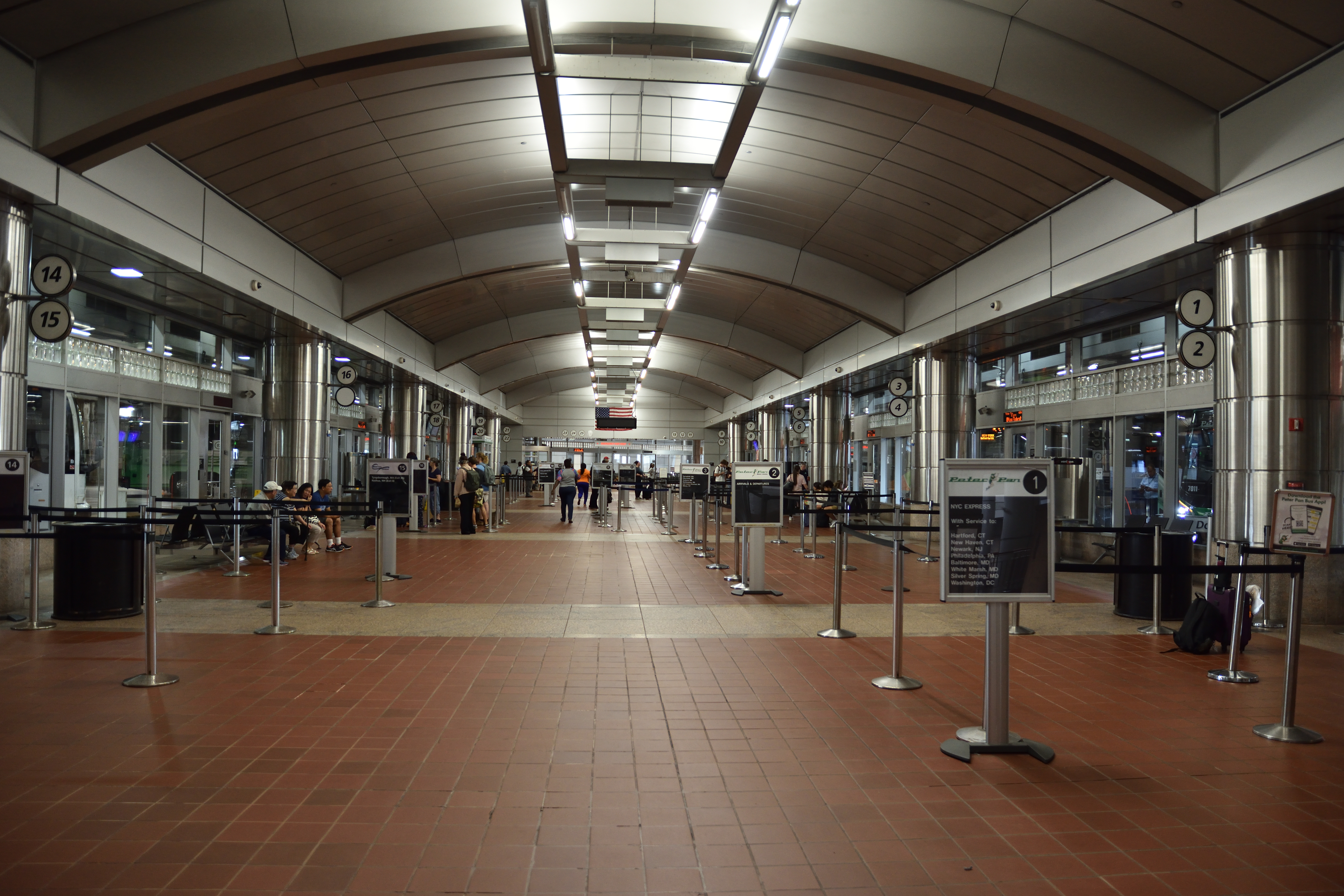
The south commuter platform

South Station Bus Terminal is located on air rights over the platforms and tracks of the South Station rail terminal in the southeast portion of Downtown Boston. Measuring about 300 by 900 feet (100 m × 300 m), the terminal is on the east side of Atlantic Avenue between East Street and Kneeland Street. The terminal has two full levels – the bus deck and the rooftop parking deck – plus several partial levels.

The main entrance lobby is on Atlantic Avenue at Beach Street; it has a secondary entrance from Platform 1 of South Station. Both lead to a concourse that runs above the train platforms and below the bus deck. Stairs, escalators, and elevators also connect the north end of the bus deck with the South Station passenger concourse under South Station Tower.

At the center of the bus deck is a 11,000-square-foot (1,000 m^{2}) rotunda with ticketing, baggage handling, and retail facilities around its perimeter. It is illuminated by a domed skylight more than 50 feet (15 m) across. Escalators in the rotunda connect the entrance concourse to the bus deck. A mezzanine above the outside of the rotunda holds offices.

The "commuter platform" concourses run north and south from the rotunda. The older south platform contains 25 of the terminal's 42 gates: 13 pull-in bus bays on the west side, 10 bays on the east side, and two curb stops on the south side. (Note: The two south gates were originally intended for shuttle service to Logan International Airport.) The newer north platform has six bus bays on each side. Five additional curb stops have access directly from the rotunda. Buses circulate clockwise around the deck; arriving and departing buses cross paths at the south end of the terminal. On the west side of the deck is a lane for staging buses.

The top of the terminal is a multi-level parking garage with about 750 spaces. It provides both paid daily parking and free short-term parking for passenger pick-up and drop-off. The main parking deck is 56 feet (17 m) above the South Station platforms, with several partial levels over its north half. A package express facility is located on the deck. The terminal is accessible. One elevator connects the ground floor and concourse; two connect the concourse, bus deck, mezzanine, and main parking deck. Two elevators connect the bus deck to South Station.

The exterior of the building is clad in aluminum. The industrial-style interior finish includes aluminum, steel, concrete, and granite – durable materials chosen for ease of maintenance. The rotunda has marble flooring. On the curved walls of the rotunda mezzanine are two 30-foot (9.1 m)-long murals by Todd McKie. Entitled Are We There Yet?, the enamel-on-steel murals depict colorful abstract figures.

Ramps connect the bus deck and parking deck to an elevated roadway, the South Station Connector, located southwest of the terminal. It has ramps connecting to the Boston surface street network at Kneeland Street, as well as to the Massachusetts Turnpike (Interstate 90) and Interstate 93. Additional direct ramps reserved for buses and high-occupancy vehicles (HOVs) provide access from northbound I-93 and both directions of I-90, and to southbound I-93 and eastbound I-90. A spiral ramp with entrance and exit on Atlantic Avenue also provides access to the parking garage.

When the terminal was built, all trains at South Station used diesel locomotives, necessitating a ventilation system to remove exhaust gases from the platform area. (Note: Amtrak Northeast Corridor services were converted to electric power in the early 2000s after the Northend Electrification Project was completed, but the Lake Shore Limited and MBTA Commuter Rail service continue to use diesel locomotives.) The ductwork and fans fits into a 11-foot-8-inch (3.56 m) height between the top of trains and the bottom of the bus deck. They funnel exhaust to a set of ventilation shafts on the east side of the terminal. These shafts reach 75 feet (23 m) above the main parking deck.

== Service ==
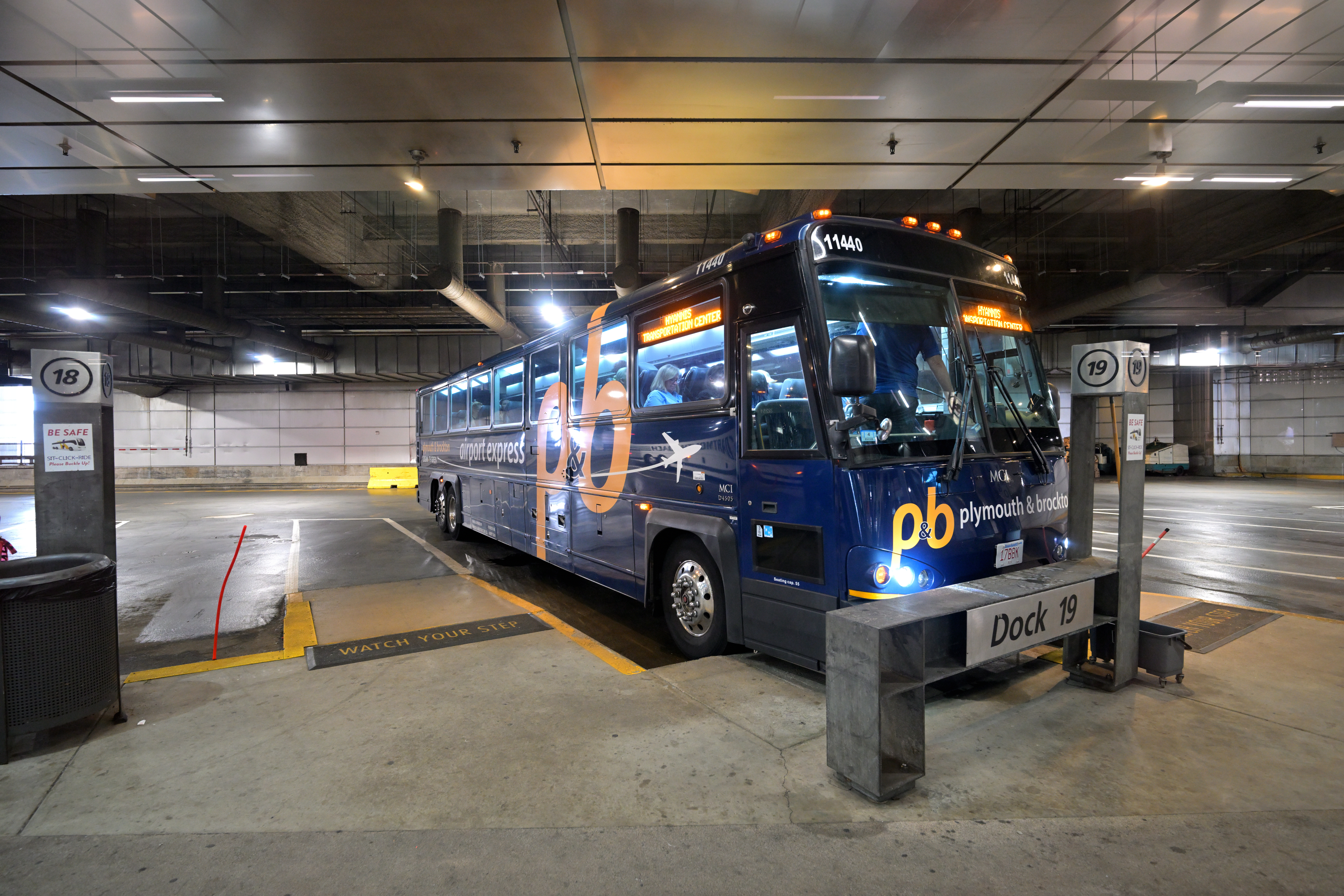
Plymouth & Brockton bus at the terminal

As of September 2026, the terminal is used by ten companies:

- Boston Express: services to Nashua and North Londonderry, New Hampshire
- C&J Bus Lines: service to Dover, New Hampshire
- Concord Coach Lines: services to Portland, Midcoast, and inland Maine; services to Concord and northern New Hampshire
- Dartmouth Coach: service to Hanover, New Hampshire (Dartmouth College)
- DATTCO: seasonal service to Newport, Rhode Island
- FlixBus: service to New York City
- Greyhound Lines: services to New York City (via Providence, Rhode Island, and via Hartford, Connecticut); Albany, New York; Bangor, Maine; Montreal; and Springfield, Massachusetts
- Megabus: services to Burlington, Vermont, and New York City
- Peter Pan Bus Lines: services to Albany; Hyannis, Massachusetts; New York City; Providence, Rhode Island; Springfield, Massachusetts; and Woods Hole, Massachusetts
- Plymouth & Brockton Street Railway: services to Hyannis and Woods Hole

South Station Bus Terminal is used by both commuter bus and intercity bus service. It is the main regional bus terminal for Boston, though six of the ten operators also serve Logan International Airport (often with South Station as an intermediate stop). (Note: Until 2020, several commuter carriers served other stops in Boston, mostly near Government Center or the Back Bay. Hampton Jitney and LimoLiner used stops in the Back Bay. As of September 2026, Yankee Line is the only private carrier to make Boston stops other than South Station and Logan Airport. Go Buses stops at suburban MBTA subway terminals at Riverside and Alewife rather than in Boston.) The terminal is among the busiest intercity bus stations in the country. In 2010, it was the sixth-busiest terminal in the Greyhound network. The terminal averaged 10,000 daily total boardings and alightings in 2025. Scheduled service averaged between 500 and 650 daily arrivals and departures in 2011. (Note: During peak travel times such as holidays, some trips operate as multiple sections with two or more buses.) The terminal is open 24 hours, with arrivals and departures at all hours.

The terminal is owned by the Massachusetts Bay Transportation Authority (MBTA), which contracts with a private firm to manage the terminal. Bus companies negotiate with the managing firm for gate access; they pay lease fees for gates and ticketing facilities plus a per-bus usage fee. (Note: Annual lease fees were $24,000–$31,000 in 2007 (equivalent to $37,000–$48,000 in 2025). Per-bus usage fees were $8 in 2011 (equivalent to $11 in 2025).) Some carriers pool gates between them for added operational flexibility.

== History ==
=== Previous terminals ===
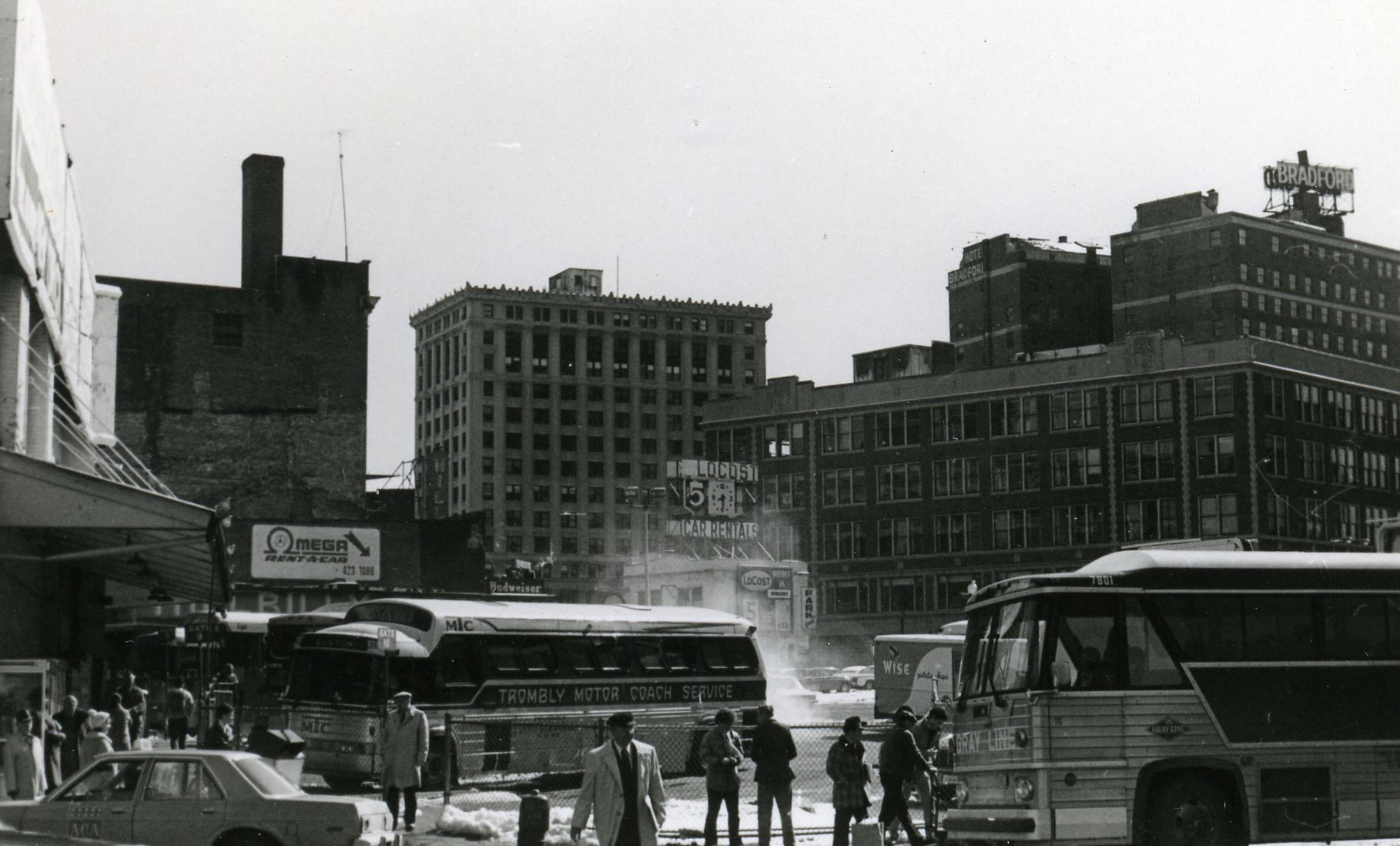
Buses at the Trailways Bus Terminal in the 1970s

Regional and intercity bus service from Boston began in the mid-1920s. A number of small terminals, most in the Park Square area, were used by different companies. These were gradually consolidated into two major terminals.

The Boston and Worcester Street Railway (B&W) opened a terminal at 10 Park Square by 1930. It was rebuilt in 1946 with off-street bus parking. At that time, it was also used by the Boston and Maine Transportation Company, New England Transportation Company, Quaker Stages, and Quaker City Bus Company. New England Trailways began using the terminal by 1949. Trailways purchased the terminal in 1958 and renamed it Trailways Bus Terminal. Other companies that used the terminal over the following decades included Almeida Bus Lines, Concord Coach, the Eastern Massachusetts Street Railway, the MBTA, Medeiros Bus Company, Michaud Bus Lines, Peter Pan Bus Lines, Rhode Island Bus Company, and Trombly Motor Coach.

Greyhound Lines opened a terminal at 10 St. James Avenue in 1950, replacing a 1935-built terminal at 222 Boylston Street (60/80 Park Plaza). The terminal was also used at various times by Bonanza Bus Lines, Plymouth and Brockton Street Railway (P&B), Short Line, and Vermont Transit. It was renovated in 1976. Greyhound sold the property to a developer in 1985; it was resold in 1987 and 1989, though the bus station remained open.

In 1975, the MBTA built a temporary busway on the west side of South Station at a cost of $300,000 (equivalent to $1.8 million in 2025). It was intended to serve MBTA Turnpike express buses while their usual downtown terminal was closed for redevelopment of the Jordan Marsh flagship store, as well as P&B buses from the South Shore. However, MBTA buses did not initially use the busway. P&B used it as an intermediate stop and as midday bus storage, but continued to use the Greyhound terminal.

On May 19, 1980, the Trailways terminal was closed to allow street reconfiguration and construction of the State Transportation Building. Trailways and its affiliates (Concord, Michaud, Peter Pan, and Trombly) moved to a temporary facility at the South Station busway. They moved again to a new terminal at 555 Atlantic Avenue in Dewey Square on November 7, 1980. It was built at a cost of $1.1 million (equivalent to $4.3 million in 2025). MBTA express bus service was cut back to use the South Station busway as a terminal from April 1981 to May 1982. In 1986, Trailways discontinued most of its remaining service in New England. Peter Pan took over the routes and renamed the station as the Peter Pan Bus Terminal.

Greyhound drivers went on strike on March 2, 1990. Because Bonanza and P&B drivers did not want to cross picket lines, the companies moved to curbside operations nearby. Bonanza bought a used van for use as a ticket office. That June, the company moved to Dartmouth Street in front of Back Bay station. On November 10, 1992, Greyhound and Vermont Transit moved to a temporary terminal at the South Station busway.

=== Planning ===
City officials proposed a large parking garage with a bus terminal at South Station, the city's largest railroad terminal, in July 1958. At the time, the New York, New Haven and Hartford Railroad was sharply cutting service as new highways were opening. That December, Mayor John Hynes proposed a 1,700-space garage and bus terminal over the western tracks of the station. Construction of a bus terminal and trucking terminal at South Station was again proposed by a state commission in 1961.

In the mid-1960s, the proposed redevelopment of South Station – including a possible bus terminal – became mired in controversy. The Boston Terminal Company (a terminal railroad subsidiary of the New Haven and the New York Central Railroad that owned the station) filed in late 1964 to sell the property to the Boston Redevelopment Authority (BRA). By that time, the railroads owed $2 million in back taxes (equivalent to $21 million in 2025) for the station. The city, the Massachusetts Turnpike Authority, and Boston Patriots owner Bill Sullivan sparred over who would redevelop the property – and crucially, whether the development would pay taxes to the city. The BRA reached an agreement in August 1965 to purchase the station and took ownership on December 31, 1965.

By mid-1967, the BRA had chosen a proposal by the Massachusetts Port Authority over one from Maxwell M. Rabb. The Port Authority proposal, designed by Josep Lluís Sert, included a bus terminal, a 5,000-car garage, and heliport along with a hotel and commercial buildings. The city and Port Authority signed a development pact in January 1970. However, the Port Authority pulled out of the plan that September due to an Internal Revenue Service ruling that bonds for the project would be taxed.

Cutaway view of a 1981 model of the bus terminal showing the bus deck with commuter (left) and intercity (right) platforms

In 1974, the BRA revised its plans to preserve the historic South Station building, with bus facilities still planned. The new bus terminal was planned to be completed by the end of the decade. In October 1977, the BRA and MBTA reached an agreement under which the MBTA would reconstruction the station while the BRA would manage commercial development. The deal removed the bus terminal from the plans because funding was not available. A revised agreement in 1979 reinstated plans for the bus terminal, which the MBTA would build along with a 600-car parking deck. The MBTA took ownership of South Station that August, though the BRA retained air rights.

The Federal Railroad Administration released the draft environmental impact statement for the South Station project, including the bus terminal, in 1980. The final environmental impact statement was released the next year. It included a two-phase air rights development. The first phase would include three levels with a bus terminal and 800 parking spaces; the second would add commercial development and more parking. The bus terminal was to have a ticketing concourse on the first level above the tracks and a bus deck on the second level. They would be connected by a rotunda with a large skylight. The bus deck would be divided into pull-in bus berths for intercity buses and pull-through platforms for commuter buses.

In 1982, the Federal Transit Administration awarded the MBTA $14 million (equivalent to $47 million in 2025) for bus terminal construction and relocation of nearby Massachusetts Turnpike ramps. The renovation of South Station lasted from 1984 to 1989. During construction, footings were placed between the tracks to support the future development. Additional funding for the bus terminal came from a 1988 state bond bill.

=== Construction and usage ===
In January 1989, the MBTA awarded a $4.67 million final design contract (equivalent to $12.1 million in 2025) to The Architects Collaborative and Howard, Needles, Tammen & Bergendoff. The MBTA approved the final design in December 1990. Late-1980s plans had called for 45 bus berths and 550 parking spaces. However, the final design included only 29 bus berths – fewer than were available at the three terminals it replaced – and 215 spaces due to budget limitations. In 1991, the state agreed to build a set of transit projects as part of an agreement with the Conservation Law Foundation (CLF), which had threatened a lawsuit over auto emissions from the Central Artery/Tunnel Project (Big Dig). Among these projects was the bus terminal, to be complete by the end of 1994. The agency awarded a construction contract for the $81 million project (equivalent to $186 million in 2025) in September 1992.

The new bus terminal opened on October 28, 1995, though ticketing facilities were not completed until 1996. The companies using the Greyhound and Peter Pan terminals moved in immediately, while Bonanza did not begin using the terminal until December 3. Peter Pan recorded a 25% increase in ridership after moving to the terminal. By early 2000, the terminal served 12,000 daily riders. In 2005, its six pay phones were the busiest in the city. In 1999, the MBTA installed a memorial plaque honoring John J. "Happy" Coombs", an ironworker who died in a June 1995 fall during construction.

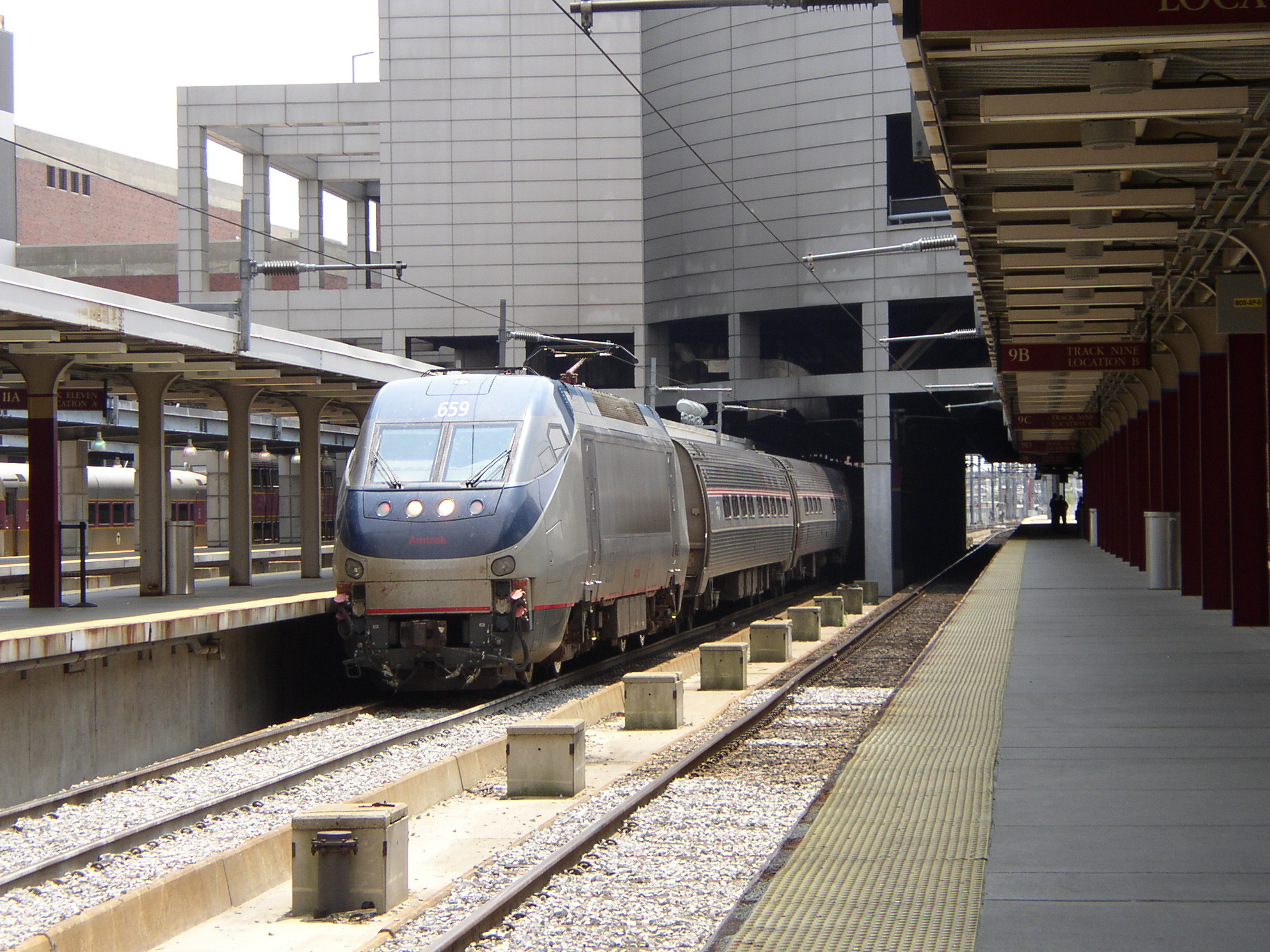
The terminal viewed from the South Station platforms in 2006

In August 2000, a state audit found that change orders added $14.7 million to the original $81.4 million construction cost of the terminal. It also noted that when the MBTA cancelled plans for a moving walkway between the bus terminal and rail station, the agency settled for $1.4 million – substantially less than the $6.6 million estimated cost. (Note: Costs equivalent to $31 million, $172 million, $3 million, and $14 million in 2025.) The moving walkway was to have been on the west side of the rail platforms next to Atlantic Avenue. In 2006, the MBTA added an entrance into the bus terminal lobby from the westernmost rail platform, providing a covered path between the rail terminal and bus terminal.

When opened, the ramps to the bus and parking decks connected only to Kneeland Street. They were reconfigured by the Big Dig project as part of the South Bay Interchange. A direct ramp from the eastbound Turnpike for buses and high-occupancy vehicles (HOVs) opened in December 2003. The South Station Connector replaced the Kneeland Street ramps in 2005. It included additional direct bus/HOV ramps, which opened in stages over the second half of the year.

The set of companies using the terminal has changed over time. Massport-managed Logan Dart service ran between the terminal and Logan International Airport from November 2000 to November 2001. Concord Coach subsidiaries Dartmouth Coach and Boston Express began service to the terminal in 2000 and 2007. Bloom Bus ceased using the terminal in 2003. DATTCO took over American Eagle (successor to Medeiros) service in 2004. That year, Chinatown bus lines Lucky Star/Travel Pack and Fung Wah Bus Transportation switched from curbside stops in nearby Chinatown to South Station at the insistence of city officials. The city has required operators to use the terminal; in 2007, Vamoose Bus was not permitted to use curbside stops in Copley Square instead.

Low-cost carriers BoltBus and Megabus began using the terminal in 2008. Fung Wah was shut down by federal regulators in 2013 due to safety issues; its berth at South Station was redistributed to another operator. Its planned return to operation in 2015 was cancelled because the company could not obtain a new berth at the terminal. BoltBus ended all service in July 2021. Capebus used the terminal from July 2021 to early 2022. FlixBus began service to the terminal in April 2022 and took over Lucky Star service to Boston that November. DATTCO ended year-round service to Boston in 2023 but began operating seasonal service in 2024.

=== Expansion ===
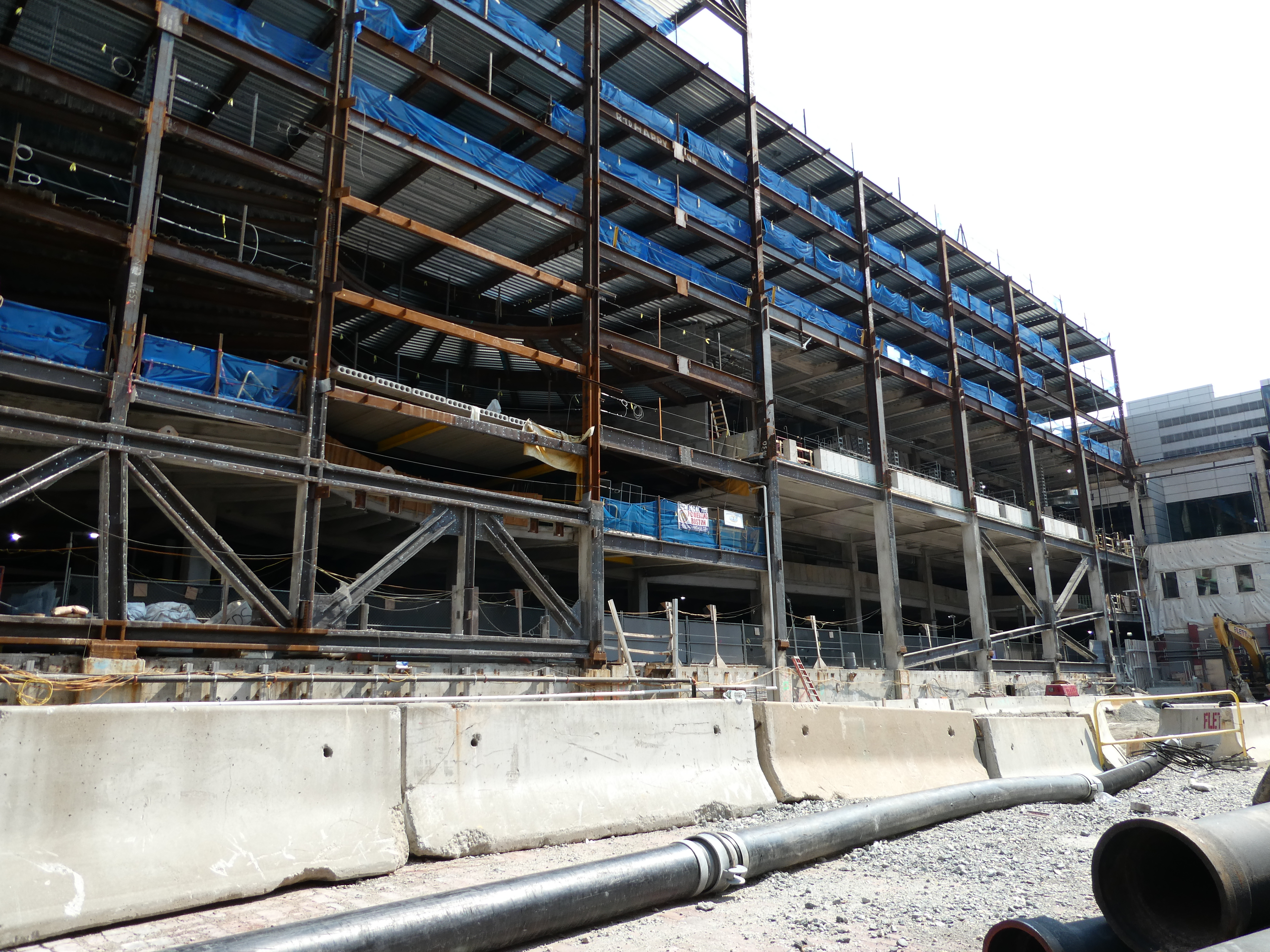
The expansion under construction in 2022

Plans for other air rights development initially proceeded in parallel to the bus terminal. The BRA issued a request for proposals in 1989. Tufts University Development Corporation (TUDC) was selected as the developer in 1991. By early 1993, with the under-construction bus terminal scaled back to 29 berths, the TUDC planned to include a 15-berth expansion in its project. Hines was added as a joint development partner in 1997. Plans released in 1998 called for an office tower, hotel, office/research building, and parking garage, as well as a bus terminal expansion of 130,000 square feet (12,000 m^{2}) with 250 additional parking spaces (separate from the larger garage).

In 2002, the developers made changes to the project as the result of objections by Amtrak, the Federal Aviation Administration (FAA), and state environmental officials. The tower's foundation was moved to avoid interference with rail traffic, while its height was reduced to comply with FAA height restrictions. The bus terminal expansion was modified to be one story instead of two. The revised project was approved by the BRA in June 2006. The 70,000-square-foot (6,500 m^{2}) expansion of the bus terminal was expected to cost $40 million (equivalent to $64 million in 2025). The development was delayed by the Great Recession; TUDC withdrew in 2009.

Hines and Gemdale Properties revived the project in 2016. Revised plans released that July enlarged the bus terminal expansion to 106,000 square feet (9,800 m^{2}). The number of additional bus berths was reduced from 16 to 12 to accommodate structural columns. At that point, the developers expected the South Station Tower, the bus terminal expansion, and the first portion of parking garage expansion to begin construction in 2017 and open in 2021. The Boston Planning & Development Agency (BPDA), successor to the BRA, approved the project in December 2016.

Gemdale sold its interest to APG Asset Management and Dune Real Estate Partners in 2019. The new consortium purchased the site from the BPDA that year. They also received approvals from several agencies in 2019, including MBTA approval of the bus terminal plans. Construction began in January 2020. The bus terminal expansion was planned for completion in July 2022, followed by the remainder of the project in June 2024. Construction was delayed by the COVID-19 pandemic; by November 2022, completion had been delayed by about a year. The steel frame of the bus terminal was complete by that time and concrete decks were being poured. The expansion opened on November 4, 2025. However, the direct entrance from the South Station platforms did not open until April 13, 2026.
