= Modesto station =

Modesto, CA
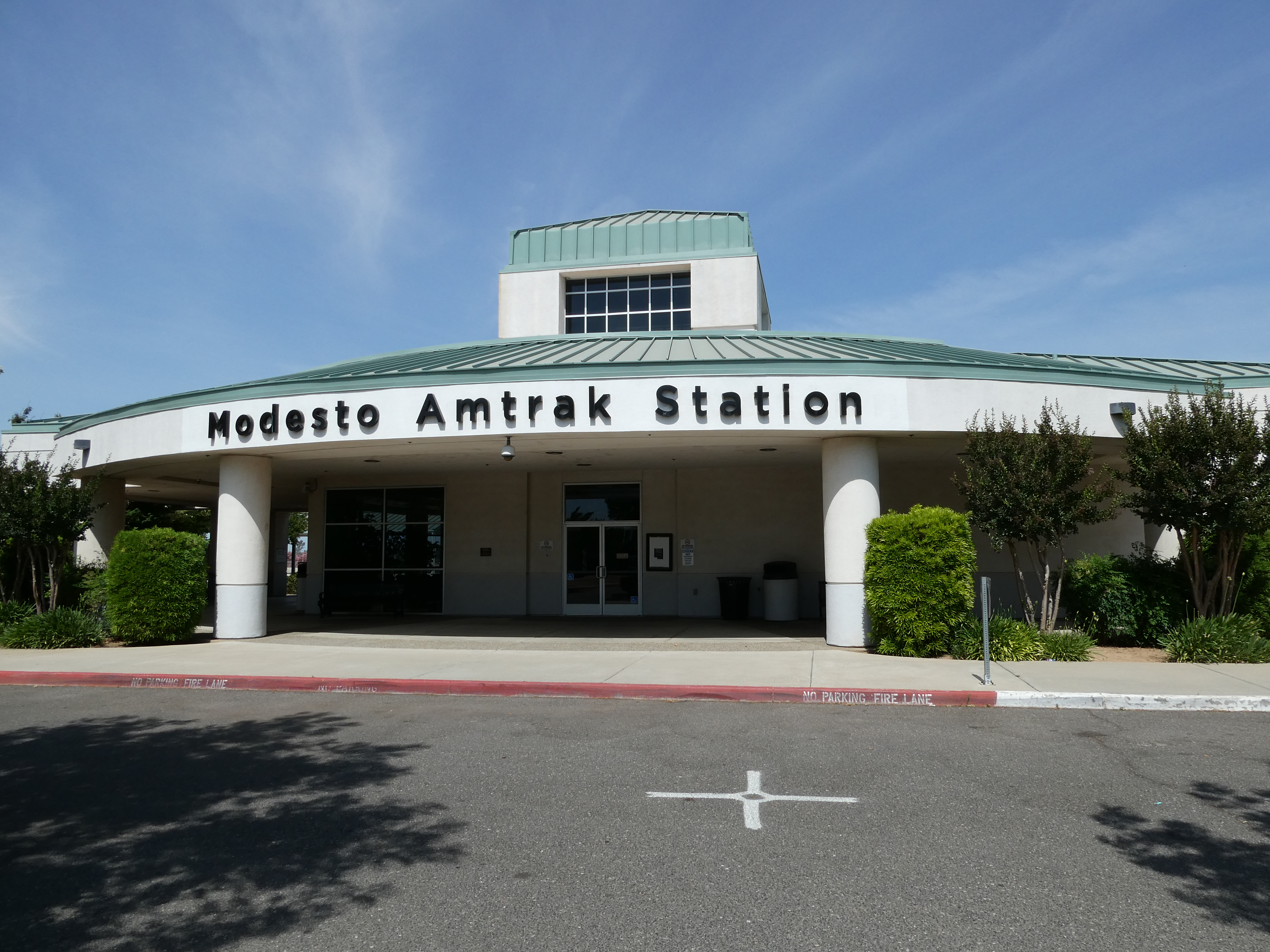
- Modesto station in May 2022

General information
- Location: 1700 Held Drive; Modesto, California; United States
- Coordinates: 37.6690288°N 120.9149256°W
- Owner: City of Modesto
- Line: BNSF Stockton Subdivision
- Platforms: 1 side platform
- Tracks: 1
- Connections: StanRTA: 25

Construction
- Parking: Yes
- Accessible: Yes

Other information
- Status: Staffed, checked baggage service available
- Station code: Amtrak: MOD

History
- Opened: November 12, 1999

Passengers
- FY 2025: 105,596 (Amtrak)

Services
Preceding station	Amtrak	Following station
Stockton–San Joaquin Street toward Oakland	Gold Runner	Turlock–Denair toward Bakersfield
Stockton–Downtown toward Sacramento	Gold Runner	Turlock–Denair toward Bakersfield
Location

Modesto station is a staffed Amtrak station in Modesto, California. It is served by the Gold Runner service. Designed by Pacific Design Associates of Modesto and VBN Architects of Oakland, the $2.4 million depot was built on four acres of former dairy pastureland. The station has one platform which serves a single track.

Before November 12, 1999, trains stopped instead in Riverbank, about 4 miles north. In the past trains also stopped at the Modesto Transportation Center, which was built by the Southern Pacific Transportation Company in 1915, and in the future rail service will move there again when the Altamont Corridor Express begins service to Modesto. In October 2024, the state was awarded a $18.7 million federal grant to build a second platform at Modesto and Denair stations.

Modesto is the point where the Gold Runner splits, with trains bound for the Bay Area continuing to Stockton's San Joaquin Street station and trains heading to Sacramento continuing to Stockton–Downtown station.

== Station photos ==
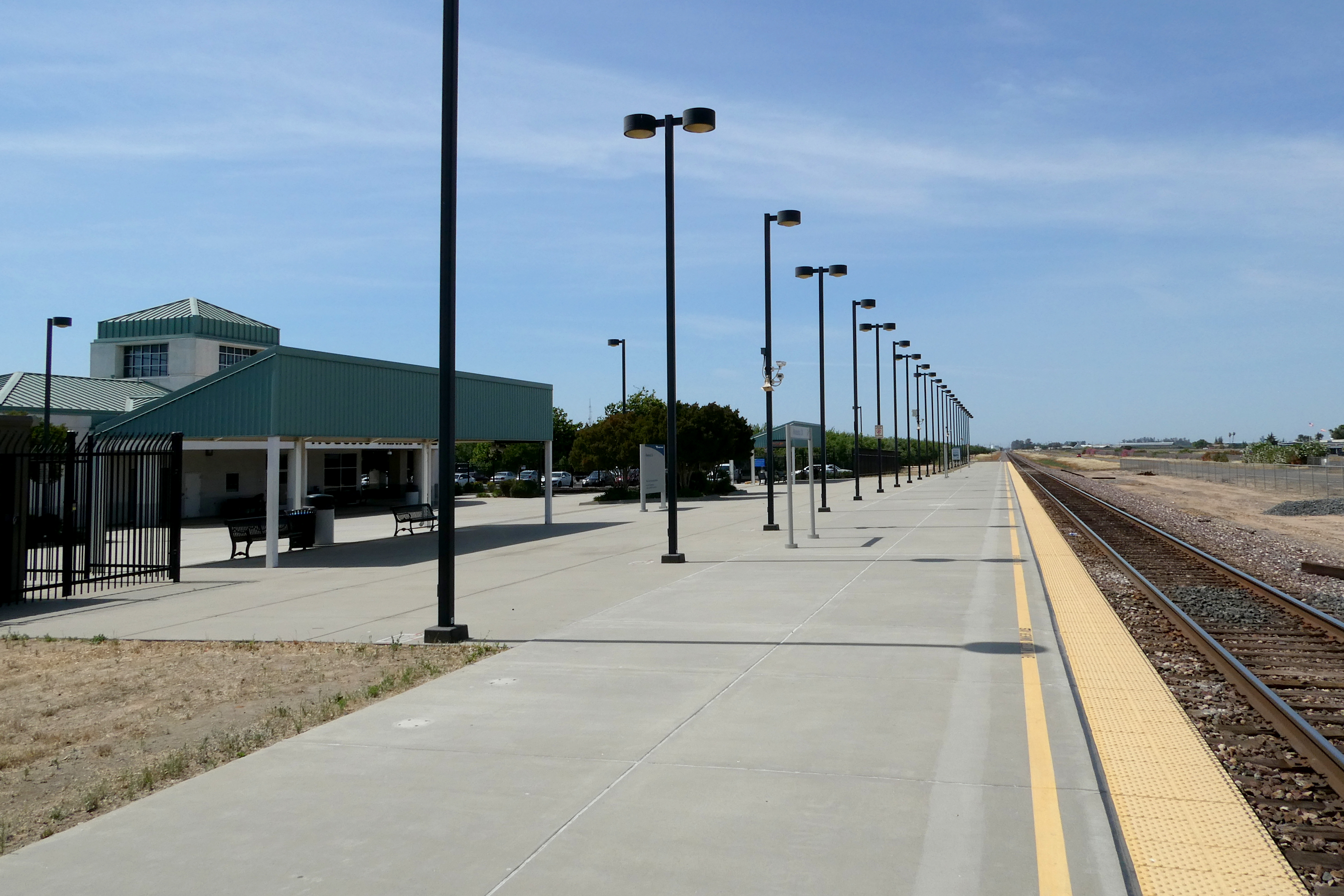
Platform

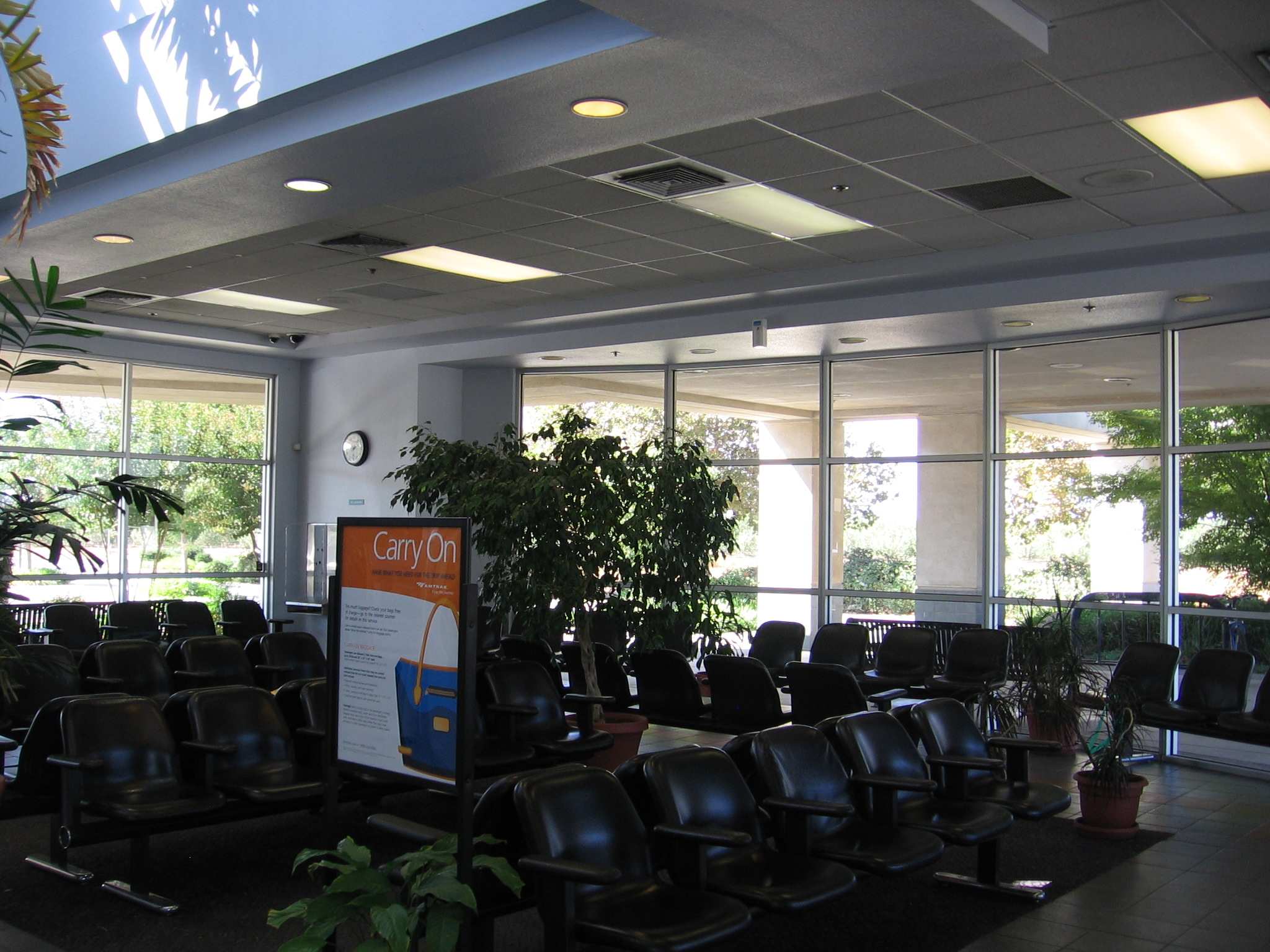
Station interior

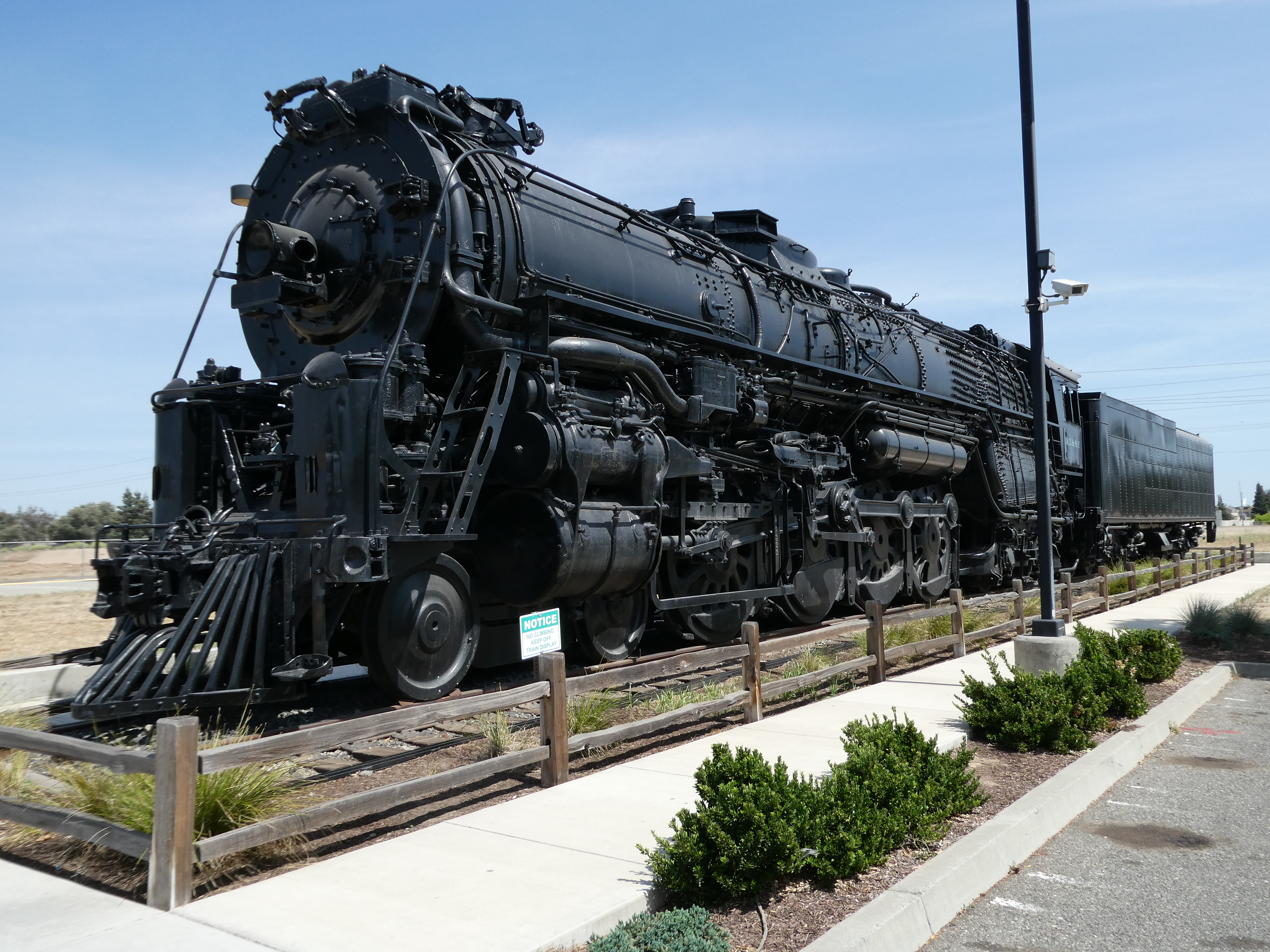
AT&SF locomotive #2921 on display at the station
