= Plymouth & Brockton Bus Company =

Bus operator in Massachusetts, US

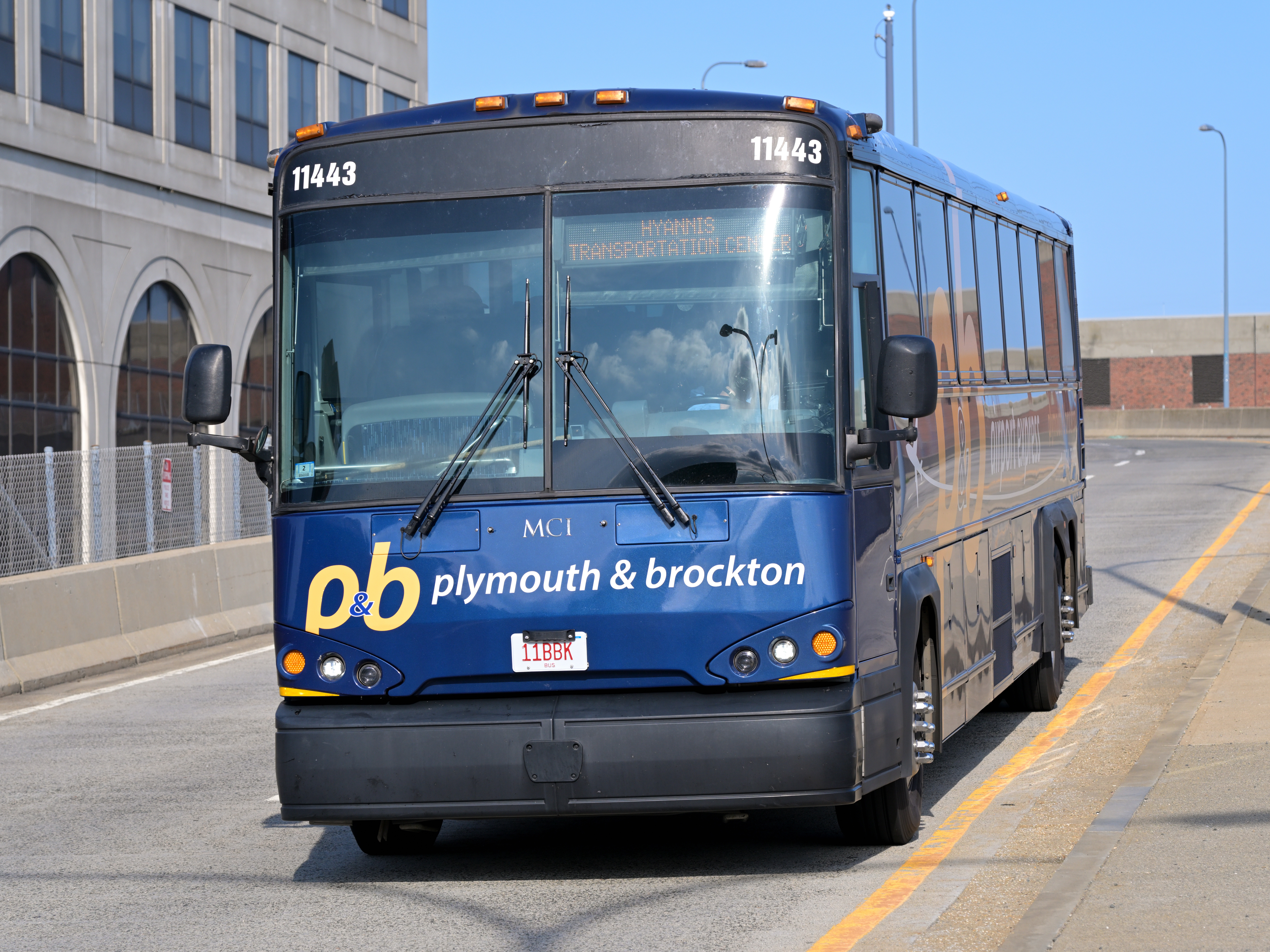
- Plymouth & Brockton bus leaving South Station Bus Terminal in 2025
- Parent: Massachusetts Transportation Company
- Founded: 1888
- Headquarters: 8 Industrial Park Road; Plymouth, Massachusetts
- Locale: Greater Boston, Southeastern Massachusetts, and Cape Cod
- Service area: Boston
- Service type: Regional bus service
- Routes: 4
- Fuel type: Diesel
- Chief executive: Winthrop Sargent
- Website: p-b.com

The Plymouth & Brockton Bus Company (formerly known as Plymouth & Brockton Street Railway Company), commonly referred to as Plymouth & Brockton or simply P&B, is a private regional bus transportation company operating in Eastern Massachusetts. It operates two routes between Cape Cod and Boston.

== History ==
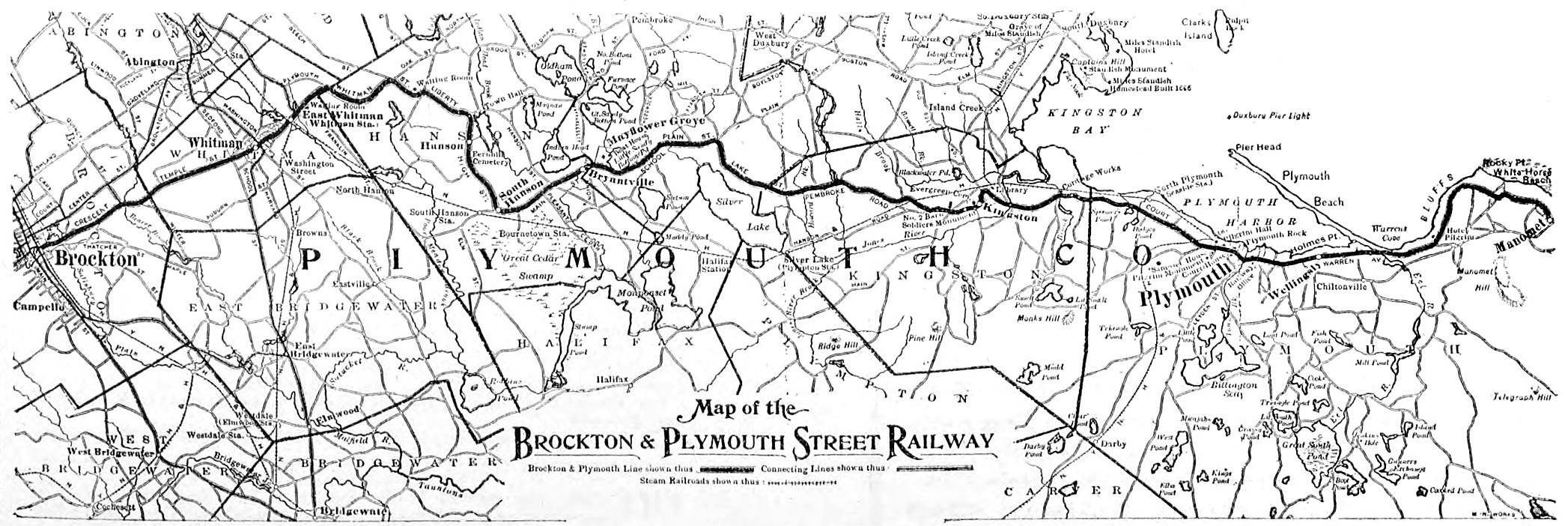
1908 map of trolley lines

The P&B was established in 1888 as a trolley company in Plymouth and Kingston, Massachusetts. At its height, trolleys operated as far as Pembroke and Sagamore Beach. The company operated trolleys up until 1928, when they switched to solely operating buses in and around the South Shore.

Due to the COVID-19 pandemic in the United States, the company suspended all service from March 24, 2020, until May 14, 2021. The company received a federal Paycheck Protection Program loan.

== Operations ==
P&B operates two routes: Hyannis–Boston and Woods Hole–Boston. Most trips on both routes serve both South Station Bus Terminal and Logan International Airport. Not all trips serve all stops on a given route.

Route	Town/city	Stop	Connections	Notes
Boston–Hyannis, Boston–Woods Hole	Boston	Logan International Airport	MBTA Blue Line, MBTA Silver Line; MBTA bus	Terminus
Boston–Hyannis, Boston–Woods Hole	Boston	South Station Bus Terminal	MBTA Commuter Rail, CapeFLYER, MBTA Red Line, MBTA Silver Line, Amtrak; MBTA bus Regional Bus	
Boston–Hyannis	Rockland	Rockland Park & Ride		
Boston–Hyannis	Plymouth	Plymouth Park & Ride	Plymouth Sightseeing Trolley	
Boston–Hyannis	Sagamore	Sagamore Park & Ride Lot		
Boston–Hyannis	Barnstable	Barnstable/Route 6 Park & Ride		
Boston–Hyannis	Hyannis	Hyannis Transportation Center	CapeFLYER; Regional Bus	Terminus
Boston–Woods Hole	West Bridgewater	West Bridgewater Park & Ride		
Boston–Woods Hole	Falmouth	Falmouth station		
Boston–Woods Hole	Woods Hole	Woods Hole Terminal		Terminus
