= Turlock–Denair station =

Railway station in Denair, California, US

Turlock–Denair, CA
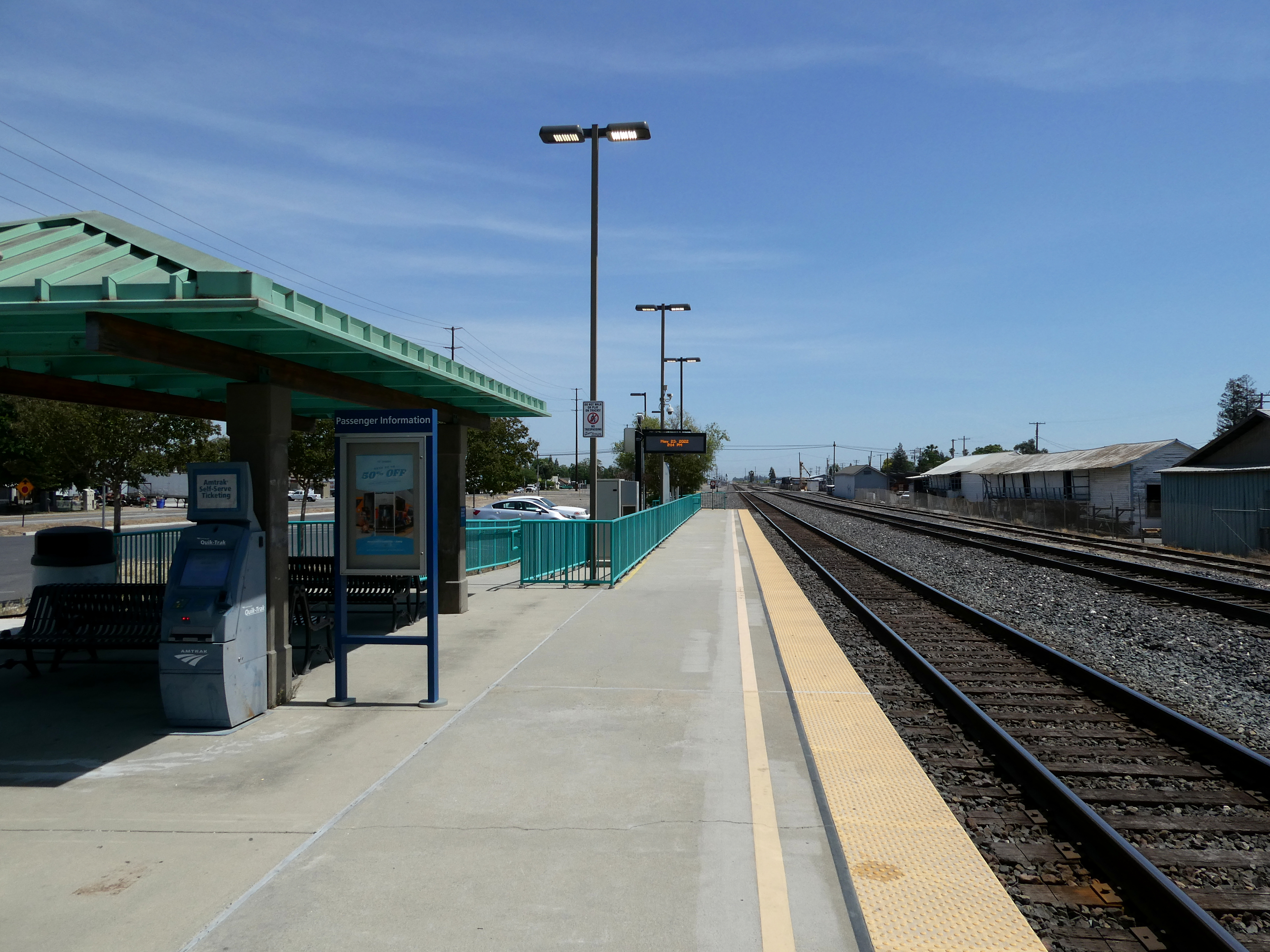
- Turlock–Denair station in May 2022

General information
- Location: 3800 Santa Fe Avenue; Denair, California; United States
- Coordinates: 37.5273°N 120.7981°W
- Owner: Amtrak/BNSF Railway
- Line: BNSF Stockton Subdivision
- Platforms: 1 side platform
- Tracks: 3

Construction
- Parking: Yes
- Accessible: Yes

Other information
- Status: Unstaffed
- Station code: Amtrak: TRK

History
- Opened: September 8, 1987

Passengers
- FY 2025: 31,978 (Amtrak)

Services
Preceding station	Amtrak	Following station
Modesto toward Oakland or Sacramento	Gold Runner	Merced toward Bakersfield
Former services
Preceding station	Amtrak	Following station
Riverbank until 1999 toward Oakland	San Joaquins	Merced toward Bakersfield
Preceding station	Atchison, Topeka and Santa Fe Railway	Following station
Hughson toward Richmond	Valley Division	Merced toward Barstow
Future services (2030)
Preceding station	Amtrak	Following station
Modesto toward Natomas/Sacramento Airport, Oakland or Sacramento	Gold Runner	Merced Terminus
Location

Turlock–Denair station is an Amtrak intercity rail station in Denair, California, which also serves the nearby larger town of Turlock. The station is served by the seven daily round trips of the Gold Runner.

The growth of Turlock and Denair was bolstered by rival railroads. Turlock was established by the Southern Pacific Railroad as it built through the area in the early 1870s. A few decades later, the Atchison, Topeka and Santa Fe Railway constructed a line roughly three miles (4.8 km) to the east, and the town of Denair developed along the tracks. Amtrak chose to use the Santa Fe tracks when the San Joaquin service was established in 1974. Denair (later called Turlock–Denair) was added as a stop on September 8, 1987. In October 2024, the state was awarded a $18.7 million federal grant to build a second platform at Modesto and Denair stations.
