= Merced station (Amtrak) =

Railroad station in Merced, California, US

Merced, CA
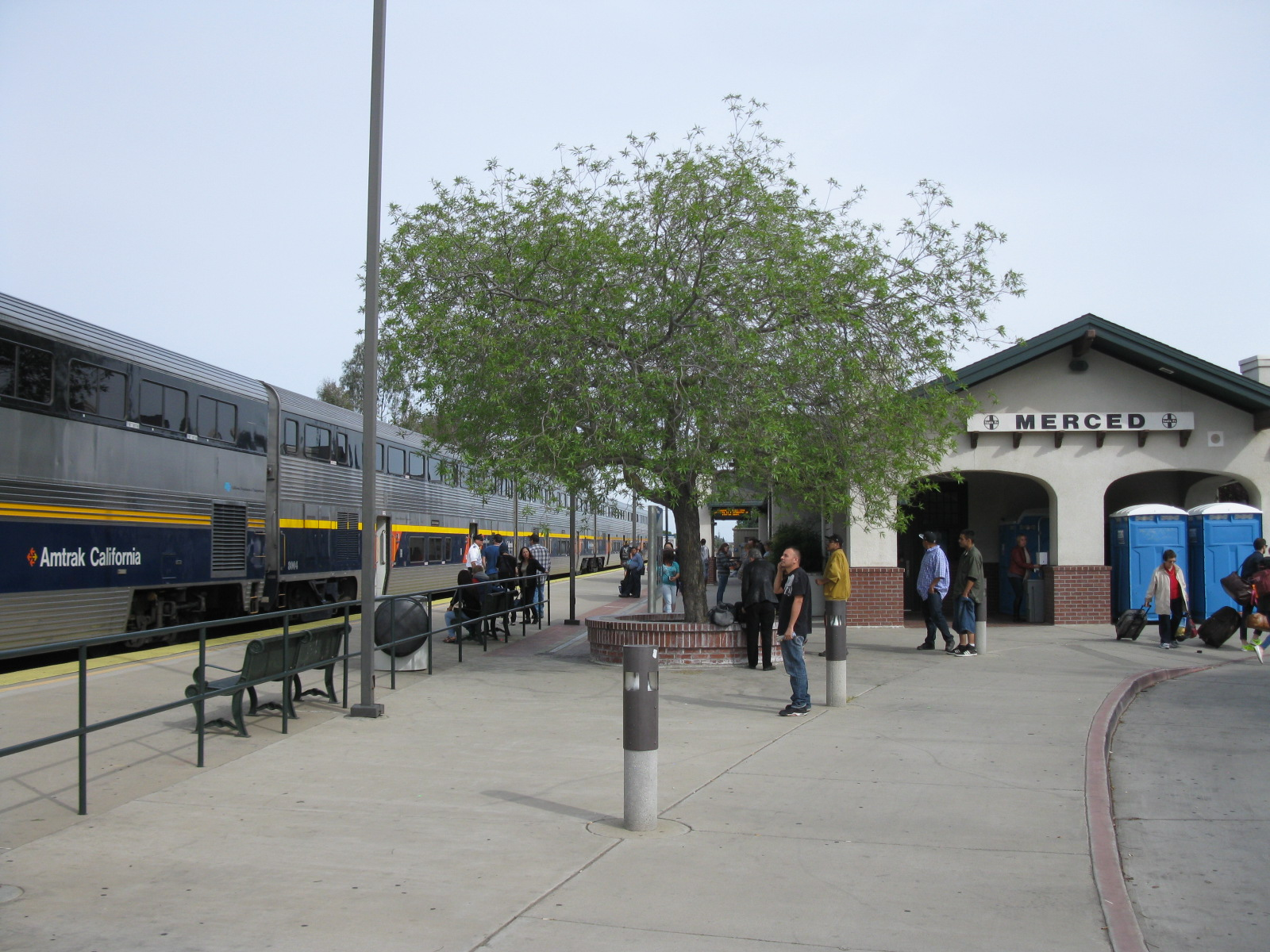
- San Joaquins train at Merced station in April 2015

General information
- Location: 324 West 24th Street; Merced, California; United States
- Coordinates: 37.3073°N 120.4768°W
- Owner: State of California
- Line: BNSF Stockton Subdivision
- Platforms: 2 side platforms
- Tracks: 2
- Connections: Amtrak Thruway: 15A, 40; CatTracks: E1, G; Merced County Transit (The Bus): M5, UC; Yosemite Area Regional Transportation System (YARTS): Highway 140 Route

Construction
- Parking: 46 spaces
- Accessible: Yes

Other information
- Status: Staffed, checked baggage service available
- Station code: Amtrak: MCD

History
- Opened: 1896; March 5, 1974
- Closed: April 30, 1971
- Rebuilt: 1917, 2000
- Original company: San Francisco and San Joaquin Valley Railroad

Passengers
- FY 2025: 135,210 (Amtrak)

Services
Preceding station	Amtrak	Following station
Turlock–Denair toward Oakland or Sacramento	Gold Runner	Madera toward Bakersfield
Former services
Preceding station	Atchison, Topeka and Santa Fe Railway	Following station
Empire toward Richmond	Valley Division	Fresno toward Barstow
Location

Merced station is an intercity rail station located in Merced, California, United States. The station is served by seven daily round trips of the Gold Runner and is a transfer point between trains and Yosemite Area Regional Transportation System (YARTS) buses serving Yosemite National Park. Merced station has side platforms adjacent to the tracks of the BNSF Railway Stockton Subdivision.

The Southern Pacific Railroad (SP) opened through Merced in 1872, followed by the San Francisco and San Joaquin Valley Railroad in 1896. The Atchison, Topeka and Santa Fe Railway (AT&SF) purchased the latter railroad in 1899 and erected a larger station in 1917. Service on both the SP and AT&SF ended in 1971; Amtrak San Joaquin service began on the AT&SF line in 1974. In 2000, the city replaced the 1917-built station with a modern facility of similar design.

== History ==
The first railroad through Merced was the Central Pacific Railroad, a subsidiary of the Southern Pacific Railroad (SP), which reached the village on January 15, 1872. Charles Henry Huffman, who was the SP's agent for land acquisition, founded Merced and moved there when the railroad opened. The original village was along Bear Creek, but the town center quickly became the SP station. A branch to Oakdale (later extended to Stockton) was completed in 1891. The SP later built a new station off 16th Street at N Street.

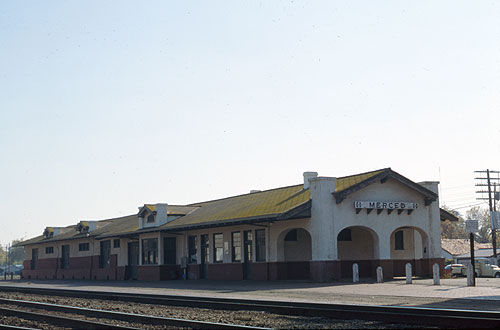
Merced station in November 1979

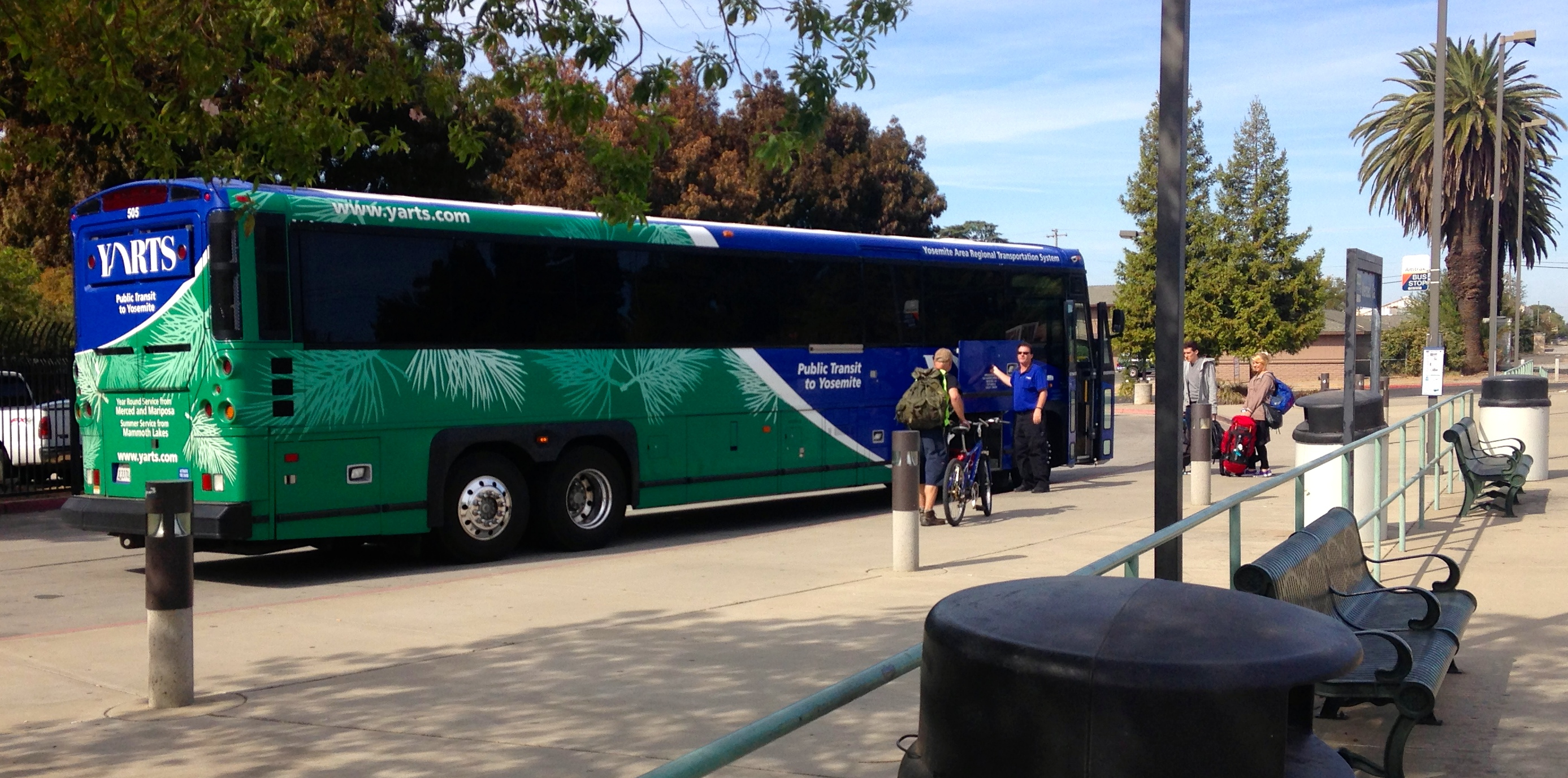
YARTS bus at Merced station in 2013

The San Francisco and San Joaquin Valley Railroad opened through Merced in 1896. The Atchison, Topeka and Santa Fe Railway (AT&SF) – the SP's main rival – purchased the line in 1899, providing it a parallel competing mainline through the Central Valley. In 1907, the Yosemite Valley Railroad (YVRR) began service from Merced to El Portal – the gateway to Yosemite National Park. The YVRR connected with both mainlines in Merced; its shops were northwest of downtown, while its station was adjacent to the AT&SF station.

In 1917, the AT&SF built a new station at 24th Street and J Street. Unlike most of the railroad's stations in California, which were in the Mission Revival style, the Merced station was also influenced by the Arts and Crafts movement. The lower part of the walls was bare brick, while the rest was coated in stucco to approximate the look of adobe. The eaves of the gabled roof provided shelter for passengers, and the northwest end of the station was open with broad arches.

Passenger service on both branch lines ended in the 1940s. Merced remained an important stop on the two mainlines, serving named trains including the San Francisco Chief and Golden Gate on the AT&SF, and the San Joaquin Daylight and Sacramento Daylight on the SP. On May 1, 1971, Amtrak took over intercity passenger service in the United States from the private railroads. Amtrak chose to run its San Francisco–Los Angeles service over the Coast Line rather than the Central Valley, and passenger service to Merced ended.

Amtrak began the Oakland–Bakersfield San Joaquins on March 5, 1974. The San Joaquin was controversially routed over the AT&SF rather than the SP (which ran through more major cities); the AT&SF station in Merced was used by Amtrak. The SP station was renovated in the 1990s to serve as the city bus terminal.

By the end of the century, the 1917-built station was in poor shape. In 2000, it was replaced by a new station on the same site. The new station, which was funded by Caltrans, copies the basic design of the former station but with modern improvements. It includes improved facilities for Yosemite Area Regional Transportation System (YARTS) bus service to Yosemite (which serves as Amtrak Thruway route 15A).

The planned Merced station of the California High-Speed Rail system will be built along the ex-SP alignment at R and 15th. Gold Runner services are expected to cease here once high-speed services begin.
