= Yosemite Area Regional Transportation System =

Public transit bus service in California, US

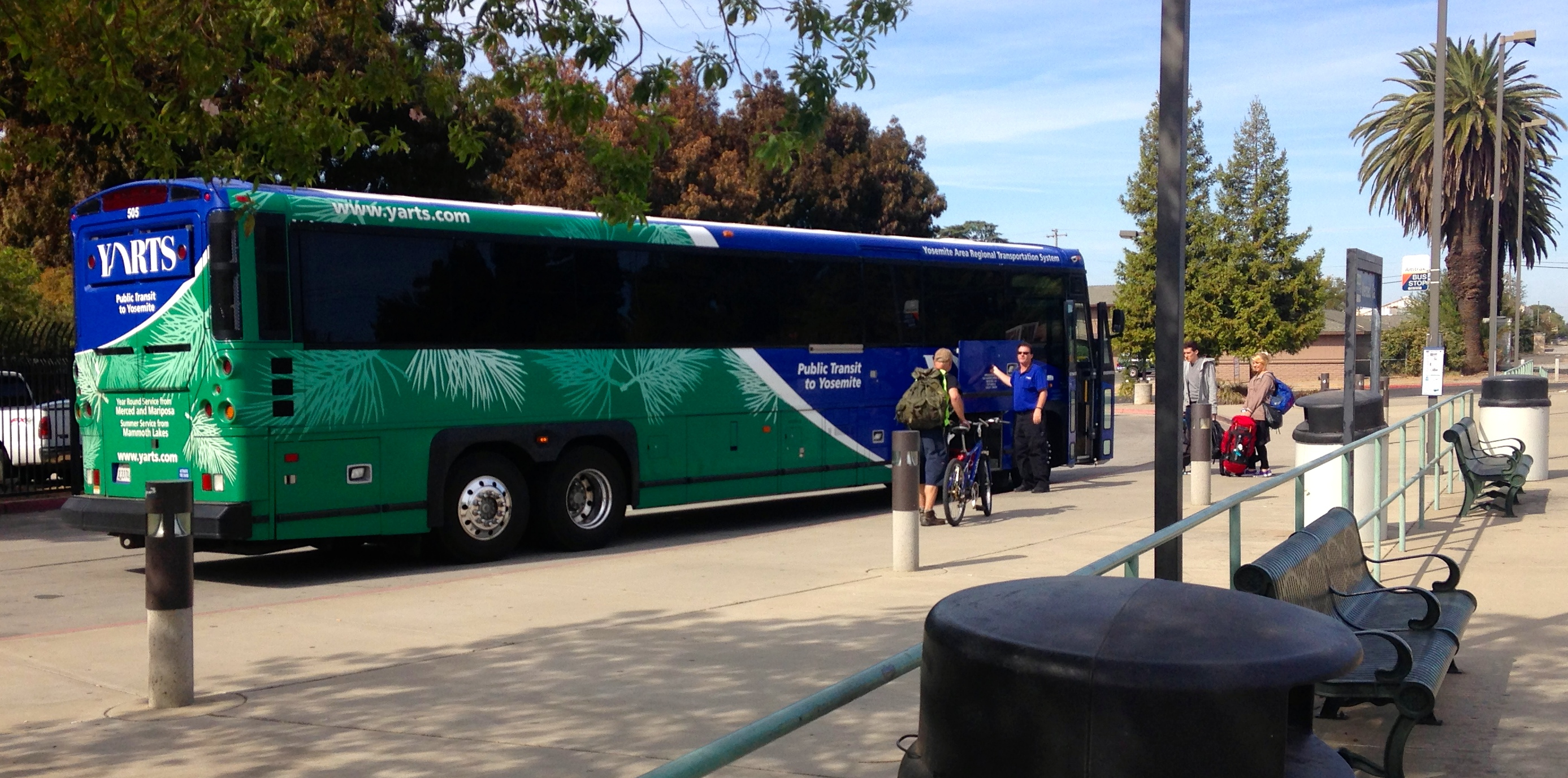
- Passengers boarding a YARTS bus at the Merced Amtrak station.
- Parent: Yosemite Area Regional Transportation System Joint Powers Authority
- Founded: May 2000
- Headquarters: Merced, California
- Locale: Yosemite National Park
- Service type: Intercity bus service
- Alliance: Amtrak Thruway; Greyhound Lines
- Routes: 4
- Fleet: 16 MCI D4500 coaches
- Operator: Merced County Association of Governments and First Transit
- Website: yarts.com

The Yosemite Area Regional Transportation System (YARTS) is a public transit bus line based in Merced, California providing scheduled fixed route service between Yosemite National Park and gateway communities. Service operates year-round on Highway 140, providing access to Merced and Mariposa counties. During the peak summer months (May through September), additional service is added along Highway 120 providing access to Tuolumne County, Highway 41 providing access to Fresno and Madera counties, and eastern Highway 120/US 395 providing access to Mono County.

YARTS is operated by a joint powers authority (JPA). The YARTS JPA is governed by a board that includes elected representatives from the counties that buses travel through. The JPA contracts with the Merced County Association of Governments (MCAG) to provide day-to-day management of the service and contracts with First Transit to operate the service and maintain the buses.

== History ==
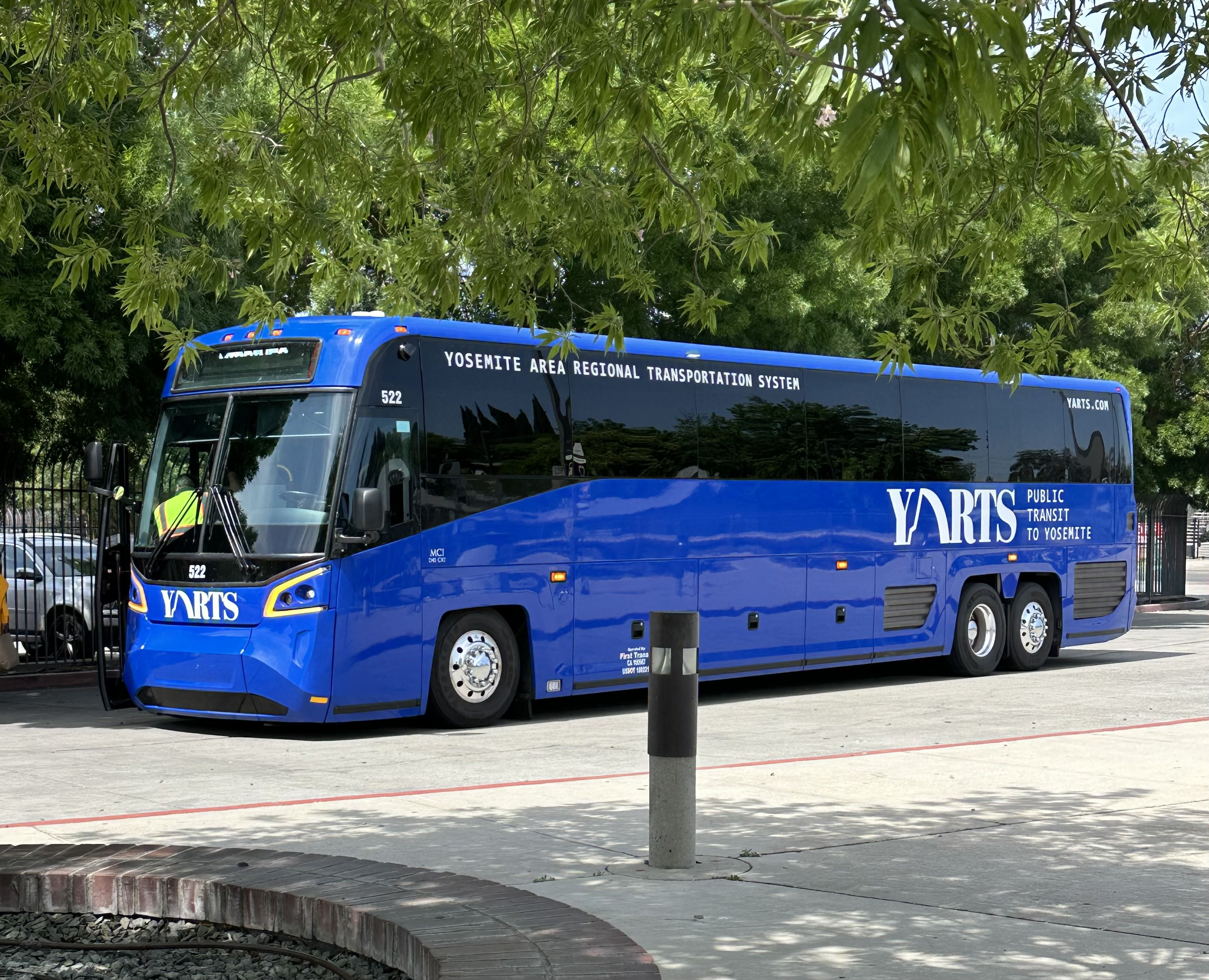
Newer YARTS bus at Merced Amtrak Station

First proposed in 1992, YARTS was designed as a way to reduce traffic and increase accessibility to Yosemite National Park. In May 2000, after 8 years of planning, the bus line officially commenced service along Highway 140 providing access to Merced and Mariposa counties. The service was billed as a two-year demonstration project, operating only in the peak summer months (May through September), and was expected to attract 18,000 round-trip passengers. Ridership fell short of expectations, attracting 15,956 riders. Critics also pointed out that over two-thirds of the riders were not paying customers, taking advantage of free rides offered during the first two months of service or were employees inside the park, who had their fares covered their employers. Despite the criticism, one year into the demonstration, YARTS was made a permanent service.

To date, the Yosemite Area Regional Transportation System has provided over 1,000,000 rides.

On May 23, 2015, YARTS began operating on Highway 41 between Fresno and Yosemite.

== Operation ==
YARTS is operated by a joint powers authority (JPA). The YARTS JPA is governed by a board that includes two elected representatives from each of the five counties (Madera, Mariposa, Merced, Mono, and Tuolumne) that buses travel through. As of July 2023, Fresno County has been extended an invitation to join the JPA if it chooses to fund the service.

The YARTS JPA contracts with the Merced County Association of Governments (MCAG) to provide day-to-day management of the service and contracts with First Transit to operate the service and maintain the buses.

YARTS has an interline agreement with Amtrak Thruway and Greyhound Lines. Amtrak offers through-ticketing between its Gold Runner trains and the YARTS routes, branding the Highway 140 route as Thruway Route 15A and the Highway 41 route as Route 15B.

== Routes ==
Route	Destinations			Period of Operation
Highway 140	Merced	Catheys Valley, Mariposa, Midpines, El Portal	Yosemite Valley	Year-round
Highway 120	Sonora	Jamestown, Groveland, Buck Meadows	Yosemite Valley	May–September
Highway 41	Fresno	Madera, Coarsegold, Oakhurst, Fish Camp, Wawona	Yosemite Valley	May–September
Highway 120/395	Mammoth Lakes	June Lake, Lee Vining, Tuolumne Meadows	Yosemite Valley	Memorial Day Weekend; June: Weekends; July & August: 7 days; September: Weekends
