= Concord Coach Lines =

Inter-city bus company in the eastern US

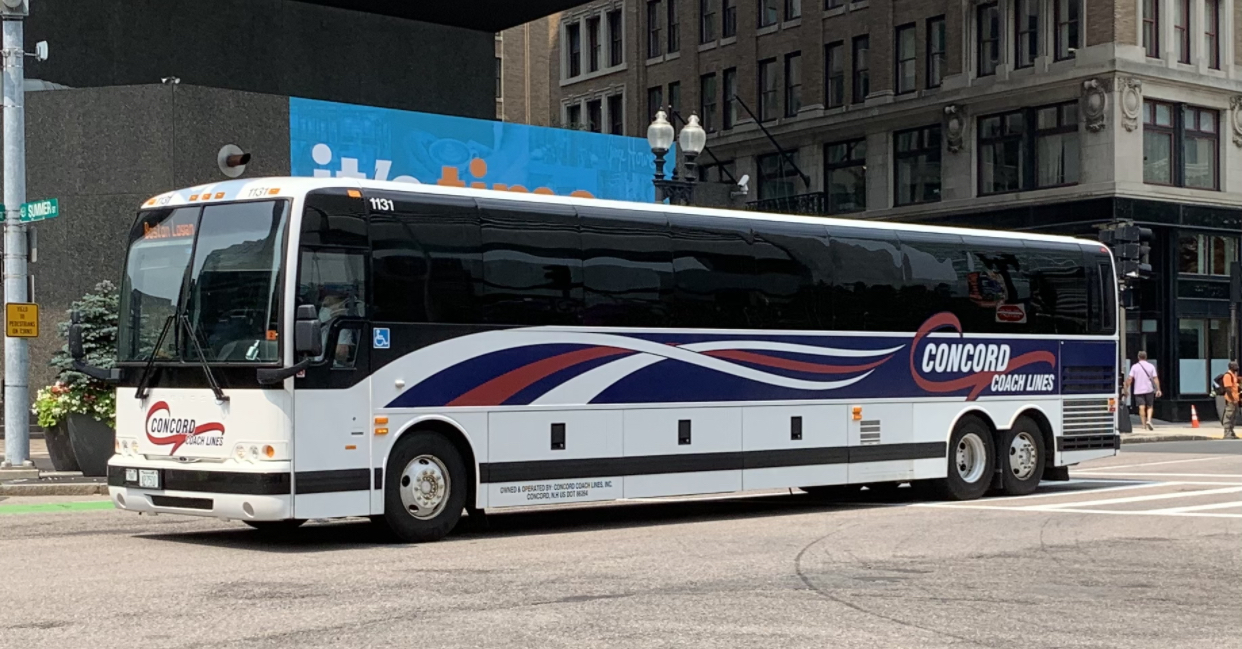
- Concord Coach bus near Boston South Station
- Founded: 1967 (59 years ago)
- Headquarters: 7 Langdon St, Concord, New Hampshire, U.S.
- Service area: Maine and New Hampshire
- Service type: intercity coach service
- Alliance: Dartmouth Coach; Boston Express
- Routes: I-95 (Boston, Massachusetts to Bangor, Maine); I-93 (Boston to Berlin, New Hampshire)
- Destinations: Maine Seacoast & I-93 corridor
- Hubs: Concord, New Hampshire; Boston, Massachusetts; Portland, Maine
- Website: concordcoachlines.com

Concord Coach Lines, Inc., formerly known as Concord Trailways, and often referred to as Concord Coach, is an inter-city bus company based in Concord, New Hampshire, US. It serves parts of Maine, New Hampshire and eastern Massachusetts, and has a route to New York City.

The company was founded in 1967, and expanded in 1988 with the purchase of the Trailways Transportation System franchise. Service to Maine commenced in 1992. The company's relationship with Trailways was dissolved in 2008, and the name reverted to Concord Coach Lines.

It operates two subsidiary bus lines: Boston Express, which runs between points in central New Hampshire and Boston, and Dartmouth Coach, which runs from Hanover, New Hampshire and the Upper Valley area to Boston and to New York City.

== Equipment ==
The current fleet consists entirely of Prevost X3-45 buses. The buses wear a red, white, and blue color scheme over a white base. Previous vehicles in the fleet have included the Motor Coach Industries J4500, MC-8, MC-9 and D4500.

== Service area ==
Concord Coach Lines operates along the Interstate 95 corridor between Bangor, Maine, and Boston, Massachusetts, as well as the Interstate 93 corridor in New Hampshire with service from Berlin and Littleton through Concord to Boston and Logan International Airport.

Specifically it connects the following locations:

Maine

- Orono (University of Maine)
- Bangor
- Searsport
- Belfast
- Lincolnville
- Camden/Rockport
- Rockland
- Waldoboro
- Damariscotta
- Wiscasset
- Bath
- Brunswick (Bowdoin College)
- Waterville (Colby College)
- Augusta
- Portland

New Hampshire

- Berlin
- Gorham
- Pinkham Notch
- Jackson
- North Conway
- Conway
- West Ossipee
- Moultonborough
- Center Harbor
- Meredith
- New Hampton
- Littleton
- Franconia
- Lincoln
- Plymouth
- Tilton
- Concord
- Manchester
- Londonderry

Massachusetts

- Boston (South Station Bus Terminal)
- Boston (Logan International Airport)

New York

- New York City

== Connections ==
- Amtrak Northeast Corridor service at Boston South Station
- Amtrak Downeaster at Portland Transportation Center

Concord Coach Lines provides Amtrak Thruway motorcoach service from Portland to Bangor and from Manchester to Boston.

== Rider controversies ==
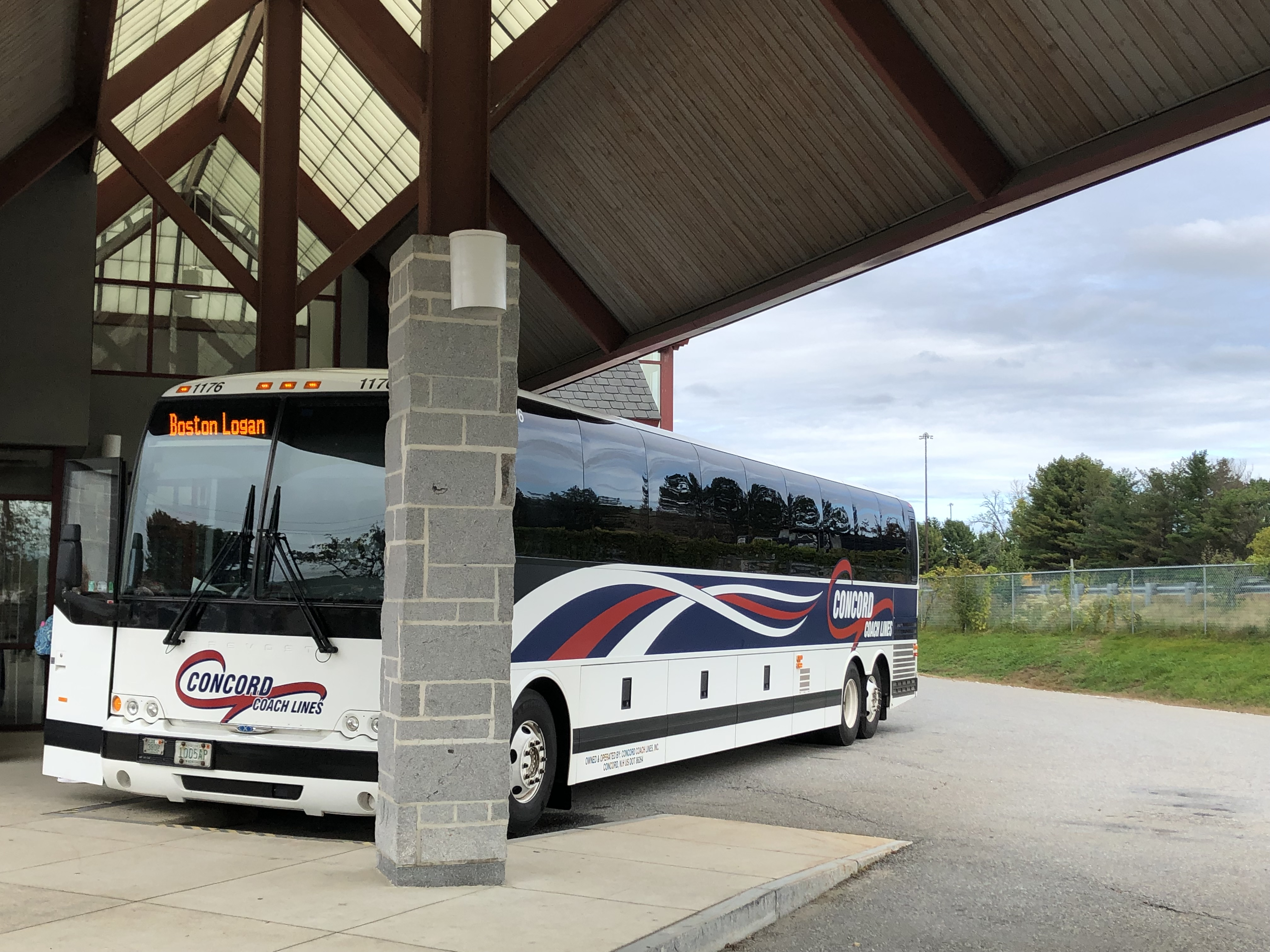
At the Concord, NH, station

On May 28, 2018, a U.S. Customs and Border Protection agent was recorded asking passengers about their citizenship status while they waited at the Bangor, Maine, terminal to board a bus to Boston. When asked, a Concord Coach employee stated that passengers must be US citizens to ride. Concord Coach Lines later released a statement on Facebook clarifying their policies, indicating that the employee was unprepared to answer that question, and that company-wide training had been put in place to address the issue.

The following August, a 14-year-old Pakistani-American was prevented from boarding a bus leaving Rockland, Maine, by the driver. Despite being accompanied by an adult, the bus driver asked him for identification and would not let him board without it. The bus left without the teen, who had to ask the family of his friend to get a ride back to Massachusetts. Concord Coach Lines policy does not state that children have to show ID. Concord denied that the teen was stranded due to the color of their skin, stating that the driver did not notice the teen's ethnicity.

== See also ==
- Intercity buses in the United States
- Public transportation in Maine
