= Boston Express =

Bus company in the northeastern United States

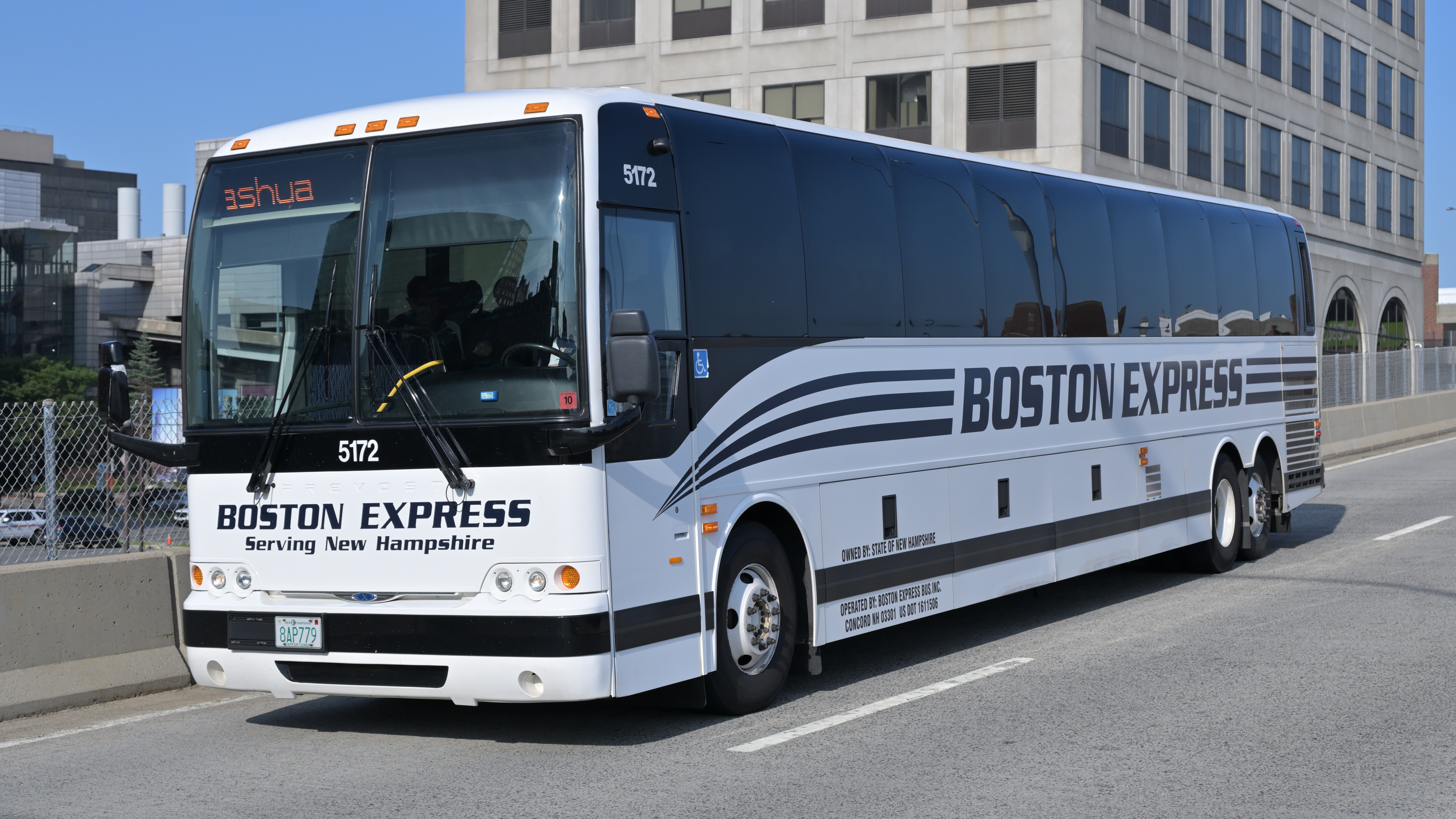
- Parent: Concord Coach Lines
- Founded: 2006
- Headquarters: 7 Langdon Street, Concord, New Hampshire
- Locale: Massachusetts and New Hampshire
- Service area: Hillsborough, Merrimack, Middlesex, Rockingham, Suffolk
- Destinations: Boston, MA; Concord, NH; Londonderry, NH; Nashua, NH; Salem, NH; Tyngsboro, MA
- Hubs: Boston, MA
- Stations: Boston South Station; Logan Airport; Londonderry Transportation Center; Nashua Transportation Center; North Londonderry Transportation Center; Salem Transportation Center; Tyngsboro Park & Ride
- Website: bostonexpressbus.com

Boston Express is a subsidiary bus company of Concord Coach Lines that operates between New Hampshire and Boston. It serves locations between Logan Airport and southern New Hampshire, including Nashua and destinations along Interstate 93 as far north as Londonderry.

== Routes ==
| Route | Terminals | | Major streets |
|---|---|---|---|
| I-93 | Concord Transportation Center | Logan Airport | I-93 |
| Route 3 | North Londonderry park-and-ride | Logan Airport | U.S. Route 3 |

== Fleet ==
The fleet originally consisted entirely of Motor Coach Industries D4500 coaches. In 2017, the company began replacing these with Prevost X3-45 coaches, which, as of May 2024, make up all of the 25-bus fleet. All buses are painted white with blue graphics.

== Reduction of service ==
As of October 2023, Boston Express no longer serves either Manchester or the Manchester-Boston Regional Airport, with service being cut back to the North Londonderry Transportation Center. No reason was given for this reduction in service.
