= Transportation in the San Francisco Bay Area =

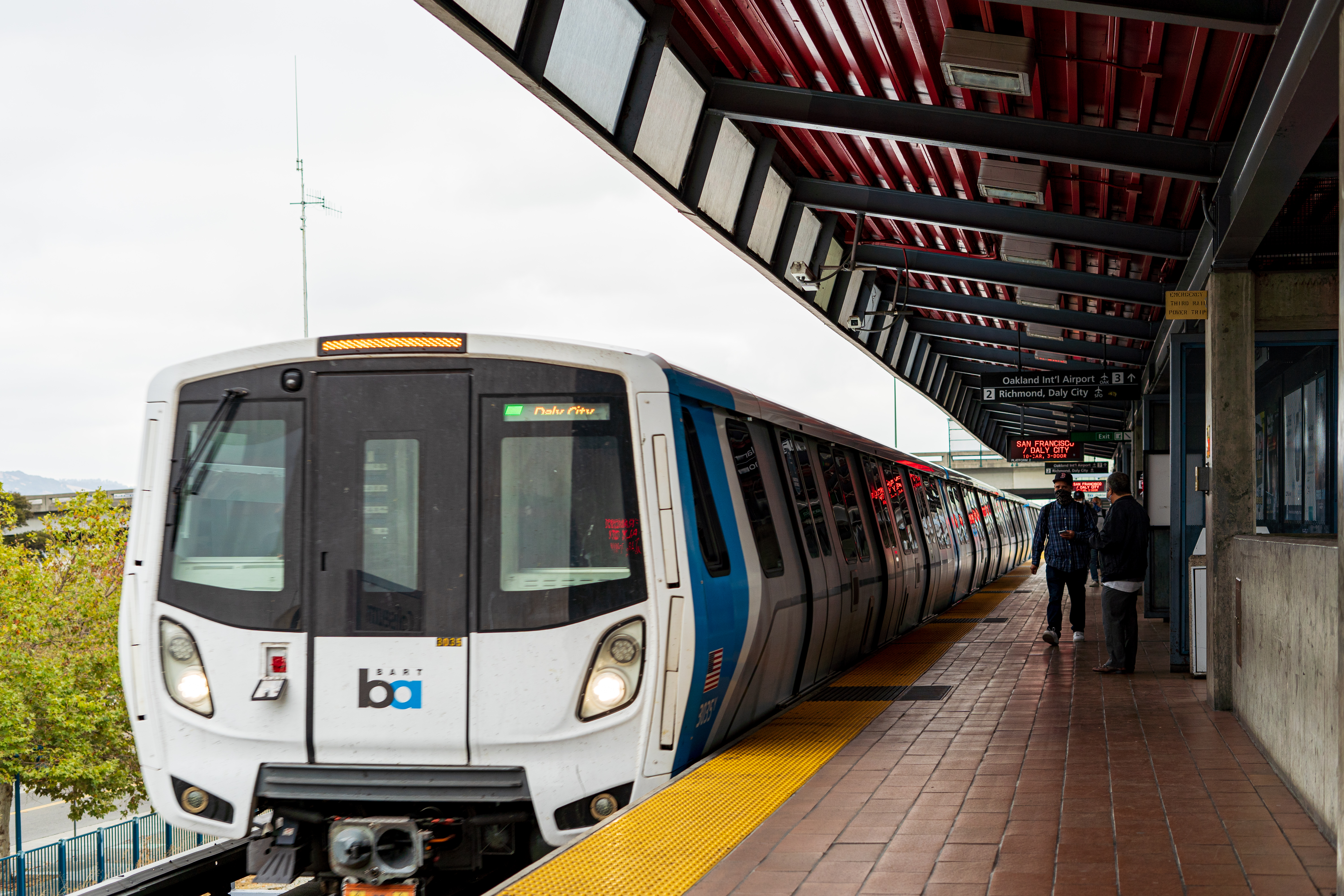
BART is a major provider of regional and transbay transit (seen here is a train approaching Coliseum station)

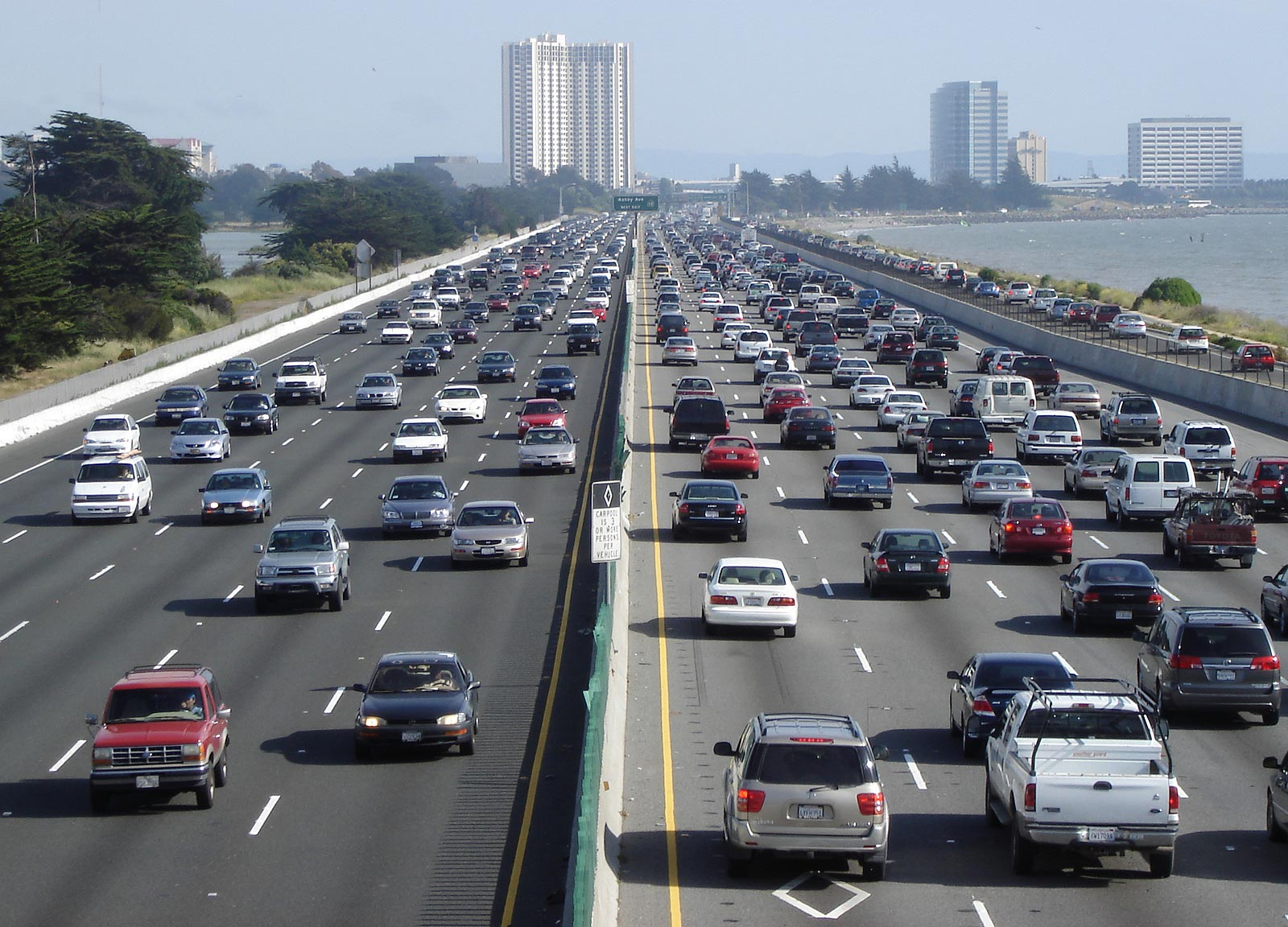
Interstate 80 is a major urban freeway in the Bay Area (seen here in Berkeley, California, as the Eastshore Freeway).

Transportation in the San Francisco Bay Area is a network of complex multimodal transportation infrastructure consisting of roads, bridges, highways, rail, tunnels, airports, seaports, and bike and pedestrian paths. The development, maintenance, and operation of these different modes of transportation are overseen by various agencies, including Caltrans, the Association of Bay Area Governments, San Francisco Municipal Transportation Agency, and the Metropolitan Transportation Commission. These and other organizations collectively manage several interstate highways and state routes, eight passenger rail networks, eight trans-bay bridges, transbay ferry service, local and transbay bus service, three international airports, and an extensive network of roads, tunnels, and bike paths.

The Bay Area, especially San Francisco, are frequently listed as one of the best and most extensive cities and/or metropolitan areas in the United States for public transportation. Local trips on transit are frequently accomplished by bus services. Different agencies serve different corners of the Bay Area, such as SamTrans serving mostly San Mateo County and County Connection connecting the suburbs of Contra Costa County; though some bus agencies operate transbay services, such as Golden Gate Transit. While ferries also connect communities across the bay, most transbay and longer-distance trips on public transportation, however, use rail-based transit. Bay Area Rapid Transit (BART) is the sole rapid transit system within the bay and the dominant provider of regional transportation between San Francisco, northern San Mateo County, and much of the East Bay. The Bay Area is also home to various commuter rail services, such as SMART within Sonoma and Marin counties, Caltrain on the San Francisco Peninsula, ACE between San Jose and Stockton, and various Amtrak routes out of Oakland and San Jose. San Francisco is also the home of the world's last manually-operated cable car system, and both San Francisco's Muni and Santa Clara's VTA operate light rail networks to complement their bus services. With few exceptions, most public transit within the Bay Area can be paid for by using the Clipper card.

Though not as extensive as Southern California's freeways, the Bay Area is also home to an extensive network of highways. Four bridges traverse the San Francisco Bay itself, and four more traverse the northern San Pablo Bay, in addition to more localized expressways such as US 101 and Interstate 280 in the Peninsula, Interstates 680 and 880 in the East Bay, and Interstate 505 in the north. Many highways have tolled express lanes, paid for by using FasTrak. Streets within the Bay Area vary from wider stroads such as El Camino Real in the Peninsula, to denser slower streets within urban cores, to scenic routes like California State Route 1. However, San Francisco has historically approached freeways with hostility, and activists have moved to stop the construction of new highways and tear down existing ones, most notably inciting the 1991 demolition of the Embarcadero Freeway. The city today is seen as the birthplace of American highway revolts.

== Airports ==
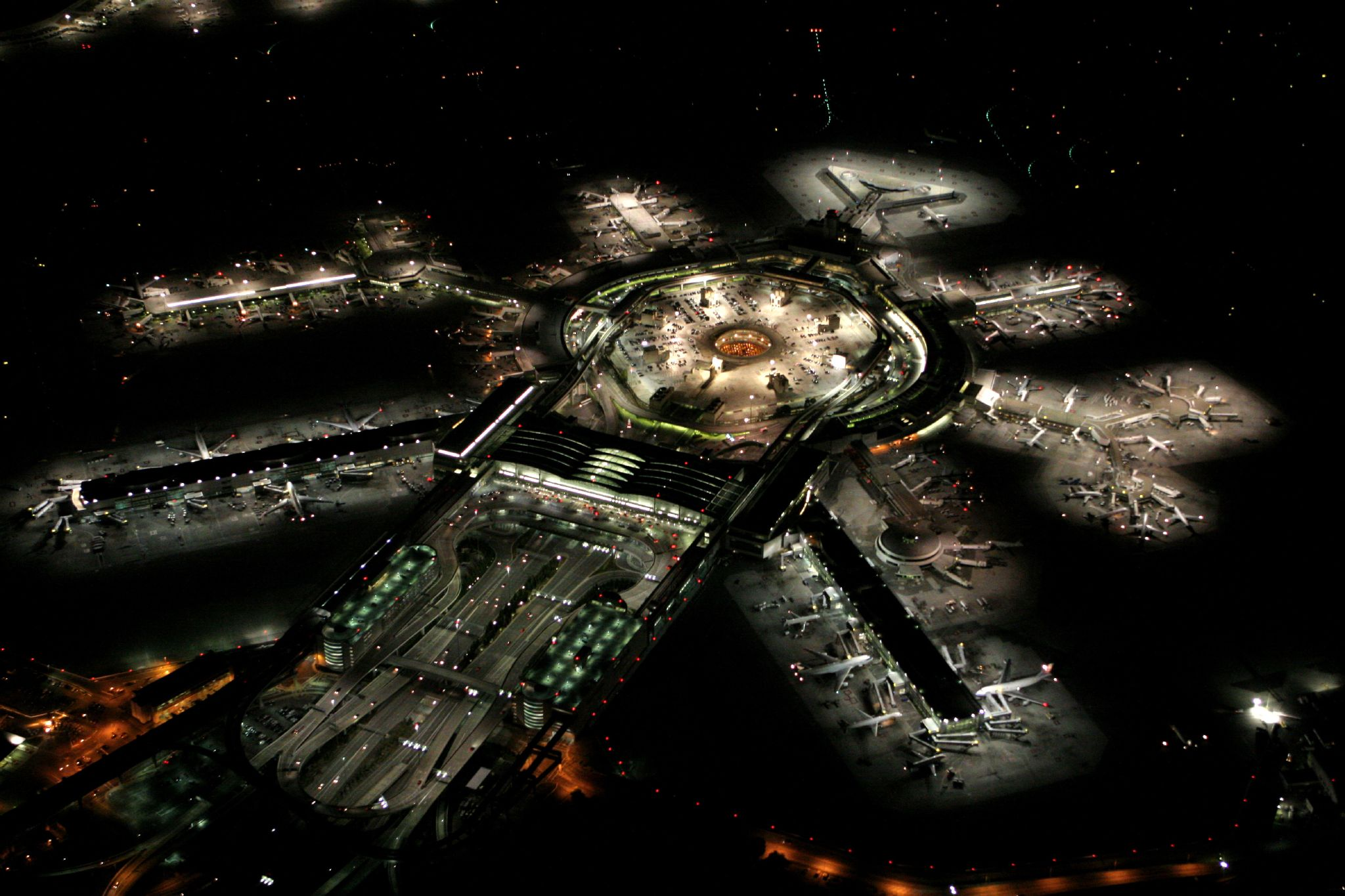
An aerial view of San Francisco International Airport at night.

The Bay Area has four airports served by commercial airlines, three of which are international airports. In addition to these airports, there are many general aviation airports in the region.

- San Francisco International Airport (SFO)
  The busiest in the region and the second busiest in the state after Los Angeles International Airport. A hub for Alaska Airlines and United Airlines. For United, SFO is the primary transpacific gateway for its route network.
- San Jose International Airport (SJC)
  The second-busiest and fastest-growing airport in the Bay Area. It serves as a focus city for Alaska Airlines.
- Oakland San Francisco Bay Airport (OAK)
  The third-busiest airport in the region and an operating base for Southwest Airlines. Oakland San Francisco Bay Airport is the oldest of the Bay Area's civilian airports still in use. The site was chosen due to good weather conditions for aircraft operations.
- Charles M. Schulz–Sonoma County Airport (STS)
  The smallest of the Bay Area airports served by commercial airlines.

=== Airport transportation ===
All major Bay Area airports are located near freeways and are served by public transportation, ride-share services, and various private shuttle bus operators.

==== Major airport/public transportation connections ====
- San Francisco International Airport can be directly accessed through BART at the SFO station at the International Terminal. Using BART, riders can also transfer to Caltrain at the nearby Millbrae station. SFO also has an inter-terminal AirTrain service.
- San Jose International Airport can be accessed by VTA Route 60, which connects to BART, Caltrain, VTA light rail and other bus and rail services at the Santa Clara Transit Center, Metro/Airport station and Milpitas station. The airport also operates an inter-terminal shuttle bus.
- Oakland San Francisco Bay Airport is connected to BART by the Oakland Airport Connector between the airport and Coliseum station.
- Sonoma County Airport is directly connected to SMART commuter rail at the Sonoma County Airport station.

== Public transportation ==
Map of rail services in the Bay Area region

Public transportation in the San Francisco Bay Area is quite extensive, including one rapid transit system, three commuter rail lines, two light rail systems, two ferry systems, Amtrak inter-city rail services, and four major overlapping bus agencies, in addition to dozens of smaller ones. Most agencies accept the Clipper Card, a reloadable universal electronic payment card.

An extensive rail infrastructure that provides a mix of services exists within the nine Bay Area counties. Bay Area Rapid Transit, commonly known as BART, provides rapid transit service between San Francisco and Contra Costa, Alameda, San Mateo, and Santa Clara counties. Caltrain, which runs on the right-of-way of the historic Southern Pacific Railroad, provides commuter rail service on the San Francisco Peninsula, linking the cities of San Francisco, San Jose, Gilroy, and numerous peninsula cities in between. The Millbrae Intermodal Terminal provides transfers between Caltrain and BART. The Altamont Corridor Express, commonly known as ACE, also provides commuter rail service, but from the Central Valley into Silicon Valley, terminating at San Jose's Diridon Station. To the north, Sonoma–Marin Area Rail Transit (SMART) line provides commuter rail service in Sonoma and Marin counties.

In addition, Amtrak has a presence throughout the Bay Area. There are two intercity services: the Capitol Corridor connects Bay Area cities to Sacramento, and the Gold Runner connects to cities across the San Joaquin Valley. Additionally, there are two long-distance services, the Coast Starlight offers service to Seattle and Los Angeles while California Zephyr runs to Chicago via Denver.

The Bay Area also has two light rail systems: one run by San Francisco Municipal Railway called Muni Metro, which operates within the city of San Francisco, and the other run by the Santa Clara Valley Transportation Authority, which operates within Santa Clara County.

A series of overlapping bus agencies provide additional public transit coverage to Bay Area regions both served and not served by rail transit. The four largest agencies, Muni, AC Transit, SamTrans, and VTA operate within the City of San Francisco, East Bay, the Peninsula, and South Bay respectively, although their service areas generally overlap with neighboring agencies and numerous smaller agencies. All of these agencies also provide limited late night bus service, which are intended to "shadow" the rail routes that are closed during the nighttime hours for maintenance. In addition, the four bus agencies are each independently pursuing constructing bus rapid transit systems by developing separated right-of-ways and traffic signaling on busy corridors, including on Geary and Van Ness for Muni, El Camino Real for SamTrans and VTA, and International Boulevard for AC Transit.

Although BART and certain bus agencies provide travel over (or under) the San Francisco Bay, Golden Gate Ferry and San Francisco Bay Ferry provide ferry service across the bay.

Most systems allow bicycles onto their systems with no additional charge. In addition, Bay Area residents may rent bicycles from the Bay Wheels bike share in certain parts of San Francisco, San Mateo, and Santa Clara counties.

=== Rapid transit ===
Agency		Train Example	Service Area	Daily ridership (Note: weekdays, Q2 2026)	Clipper Payment Option	Routes	Stations	Track Length	Track Gauge
BART	Blue, Green, Orange, Red and Yellow Lines		San Francisco, Alameda, Contra Costa, San Mateo and Santa Clara counties	198,600	Yes	5	50	131 mi (211 km)	5 ft 6 in (1,676 mm) broad gauge
BART	eBART		Eastern Contra Costa County	5,200	Yes	1	3	10.1 mi (16.3 km)	4 ft 8 1/2 in (1,435 mm) standard gauge
BART	Oakland Airport Connector		Oakland San Francisco Bay Airport	1,000	Yes	1	2	3.2 mi (5.1 km)	—

=== Commuter rail ===
Agency	Train Example	Service Area	Daily ridership	Clipper Payment Option	Routes	Stations	Track Length	Track Gauge
ACE		San Joaquin, Alameda and Santa Clara counties	2,900	No	1	10	86 mi (138 km)	4 ft 8 1/2 in (1,435 mm) standard gauge
Caltrain		San Francisco, San Mateo and Santa Clara counties	45,800	Yes	1	32; 1 planned	77.4 mi (124.6 km)	4 ft 8 1/2 in (1,435 mm) standard gauge
SMART		Marin and Sonoma counties	5,200	Yes	1	14; 2 planned	48 mi (77 km)	4 ft 8 1/2 in (1,435 mm) standard gauge

=== Long-distance and intercity rail ===
Agency		Train Example	Service Area	Daily ridership	Clipper Payment Option	Routes	Stations	Track Length	Track Gauge
Amtrak California	Capitol Corridor		Santa Clara, Alameda, Contra Costa, Yolo, Sacramento and Placer counties	2,500	No	1	17	168 mi (270 km)	4 ft 8 1/2 in (1,435 mm) standard gauge
Amtrak California	Gold Runner		Alameda and Contra Costa counties in the Bay Area section of its route	2,300	No	1 to Bay Area (2 total)	4 in the Bay Area (16 total)	315 mi (507 km)	4 ft 8 1/2 in (1,435 mm) standard gauge
Amtrak	California Zephyr		Alameda and Contra Costa counties in the Bay Area section of its route	900	No	1	3 in the Bay Area (33 total)	2,438 mi (3,924 km)	4 ft 8 1/2 in (1,435 mm) standard gauge
Amtrak	Coast Starlight		Alameda, Contra Costa and Santa Clara counties in the Bay Area section of its route	930	No	1	3 in the Bay Area (28 total)	1,377 mi (2,216 km)	4 ft 8 1/2 in (1,435 mm) standard gauge

=== Light rail ===
Agency		Train Example	Service Area	Daily ridership	Clipper Payment Option	Routes	Stations	Track length	Track Gauge
Muni	Muni Metro		San Francisco	125,100	Yes	6	33 (+ 87 additional stops)	34.6 mi (55.7 km)	4 ft 8 1/2 in (1,435 mm) standard gauge
Muni	Heritage streetcars (E Embarcadero^{1}, F Market & Wharves)		San Francisco	125,100	Yes	2	36	6 mi (9.7 km)	4 ft 8 1/2 in (1,435 mm) standard gauge
Muni	Cable cars		San Francisco	14,900 (2019)	Yes	3	52 stops	5.1 mi (8.2 km)	3 ft 6 in (1,067 mm)
VTA light rail			Santa Clara County	17,700	Yes	3	62	42.2 mi (67.9 km)	4 ft 8 1/2 in (1,435 mm) standard gauge

^{1}The E Embarcadero was suspended due to the COVID-19 pandemic and as of March 2024 has yet to resume.

=== Bus services and stations ===
The Transbay Terminal serves as the terminus for Greyhound long-distance bus services and as a hub for regional bus systems AC Transit (Alameda and Contra Costa counties), WestCAT, SamTrans (San Mateo County), and Golden Gate Transit (Marin and Sonoma counties).

There are several bus stations in the San Francisco Bay Area including Fairfield Transportation Center, Richmond Parkway Transit Center, Naglee Park and Ride, Hercules Transit Center, Curtola Park & Ride, Eastmont Transit Center, San Rafael Transit Center and many bus bays at BART stations.

==== Major bus agencies ====
Agency Name	Bus Example	Service Area	Daily ridership	Clipper Payment Option	Number of Routes				
Agency Name	Bus Example	Service Area	Daily ridership	Clipper Payment Option	Local	Rapid/ Limited	Express/ Commuter	Shuttle	All-Nighter
AC Transit		Entire: Inner East Bay (western Alameda County and western Contra Costa County); Parts of: San Francisco, San Mateo and Santa Clara counties	164,800	Yes	68	4	29	—	6
SamTrans		Entire: San Mateo County; Parts of: San Francisco and Santa Clara counties	28,300	Yes	30	—	1	—	2
Muni		Entire: San Francisco; Parts of: Marin and San Mateo counties	400,400	Yes	42	5	16	—	10
VTA		Entire: Santa Clara County; Parts of: San Mateo County	77,100	Yes	54	5	12	12	1
Note: Some routes that operate as one route type may also be listed as another type (e.g. select daytime AC Transit, Muni, and VTA services also operate as All-Nighter routes)

==== Minor bus agencies ====
Agency Name	Service Area	Daily ridership	Clipper Payment Option	Local/ Basic Routes	Rapid/ Limited Routes	Express/ Commuter Routes	Shuttle Routes	All-Nighter Routes
County Connection	Parts of: Contra Costa County (Concord, Martinez, Orinda, San Ramon, Walnut Creek) and Alameda County (Dublin/Pleasanton BART)	9,900	Yes	35	—	7	2	—
Dumbarton Express	Parts of: Alameda County (Fremont, Newark, Union City) and Santa Clara County (Palo Alto)	—	Yes	—	—	3	Yes	—
Emery Go-Round	Entire: Emeryville Connects with (MacArthur BART) in Oakland	—	Free	2	—	—	—	—
Fairfield and Suisun Transit	Parts of: Sacramento city, and Contra Costa, Yolo, and Solano counties	800	Yes	10	—	4	—	—
Golden Gate Transit	Parts of: San Francisco, and Contra Costa County (El Cerrito, Richmond), Marin County, and Sonoma County (Santa Rosa)	6,000	Yes	3	1	4	—	—
Healdsburg Transit	Entire: Healdsburg	—	No	1	—	—	1	—
Marin Transit	Entire: Marin County	10,200	Yes	20	—	—	1	—
Petaluma Transit	Entire: Petaluma	—	Yes	5	—	—	—	—
RidePal	Parts of: Alameda, Santa Clara, Contra Costa, San Francisco counties	—	Yes – ID only	25	—	25	0	—
San Benito County Transit	Entire: San Benito County; Parts of: Santa Clara County (Gilroy)	—	No	6	2	—	—	—
San Leandro LINKS	Entire: San Leandro	—	Free	1	—	—	—	—
Santa Cruz Metro	Entire: Santa Cruz County; Parts of: Santa Clara County (San Jose)	20,000	No	30	5	1	—	—
Santa Rosa CityBus	Entire: Santa Rosa	—	Yes	18	—	—	—	—
SolTrans	Parts of: San Francisco, and Contra Costa and Solano counties	3,800	Yes	11	—	6	—	—
Sonoma County Transit	Entire: Sonoma County; Parts of: Marin County (Novato)	—	Yes	19	—	4	—	—
Stanford Marguerite	Entire: Stanford University campus Parts of: Santa Clara County (Palo Alto and Mountain View), San Mateo County (Menlo Park), and Alameda County (Fremont and Union City)	5,300	Free	7	3	—	9	3
Tri Delta Transit	Eastern Contra Costa County (Antioch, Brentwood, Concord, Martinez, Pittsburg)	4,700	Yes	13	—	7	1	—
Union City Transit	Entire: Union City	—	Yes	5	—	—	—	—
Vacaville City Coach	Entire: Vacaville	1,700	Yes	4	—	—	—	—
VINE	Entire: Napa County; Parts of: Solano County (Vallejo)	1,900	Yes	12	—	2	4	—
WestCAT	Parts of: San Francisco and Contra Costa County	4,944	Yes	10	—	4	—	—
Wheels	Parts of: Contra Costa County (San Ramon, Walnut Creek) and Alameda County (Dublin, Livermore, Pleasanton)	4,300	Yes	7	2	3	2	—
Note: Some of the agencies listed above may have primary operating zones outside of the Bay Area but serve at least portions of Bay Area regions.

Several other transit agencies (including San Benito Transit, Stanislaus Regional Transit Authority, San Joaquin RTD, Rio Vista Delta Breeze, Mendocino Transit, and Santa Cruz Metro) operate regional service from outside the Bay Area to transit stations in the Bay Area.

Private bus companies operate an additional 800 buses, often referred to as tech shuttles. If combined, private shuttles would be the 7th largest transportation provider in the Bay Area.

=== Ferries ===
Agency Name	FerryExample	Service Area	Daily ridership	Clipper Payment Option	Routes	Terminals
Golden Gate Ferry		San Francisco and Marin County	6,200	Yes	2 (+2 limited)	4 (+2 limited)
Oakland Alameda Water Shuttle		Oakland and Alameda		Free	1	2
San Francisco Bay Ferry		San Francisco, Alameda, Contra Costa, San Mateo, and Solano counties	11,600	Yes	6 (+3 limited)	10 (+2 limited)
Treasure Island Ferry		San Francisco		No	1	2

There are also private ferries from Emeryville, Berkeley, and Richmond.

=== Bike and scooter sharing ===
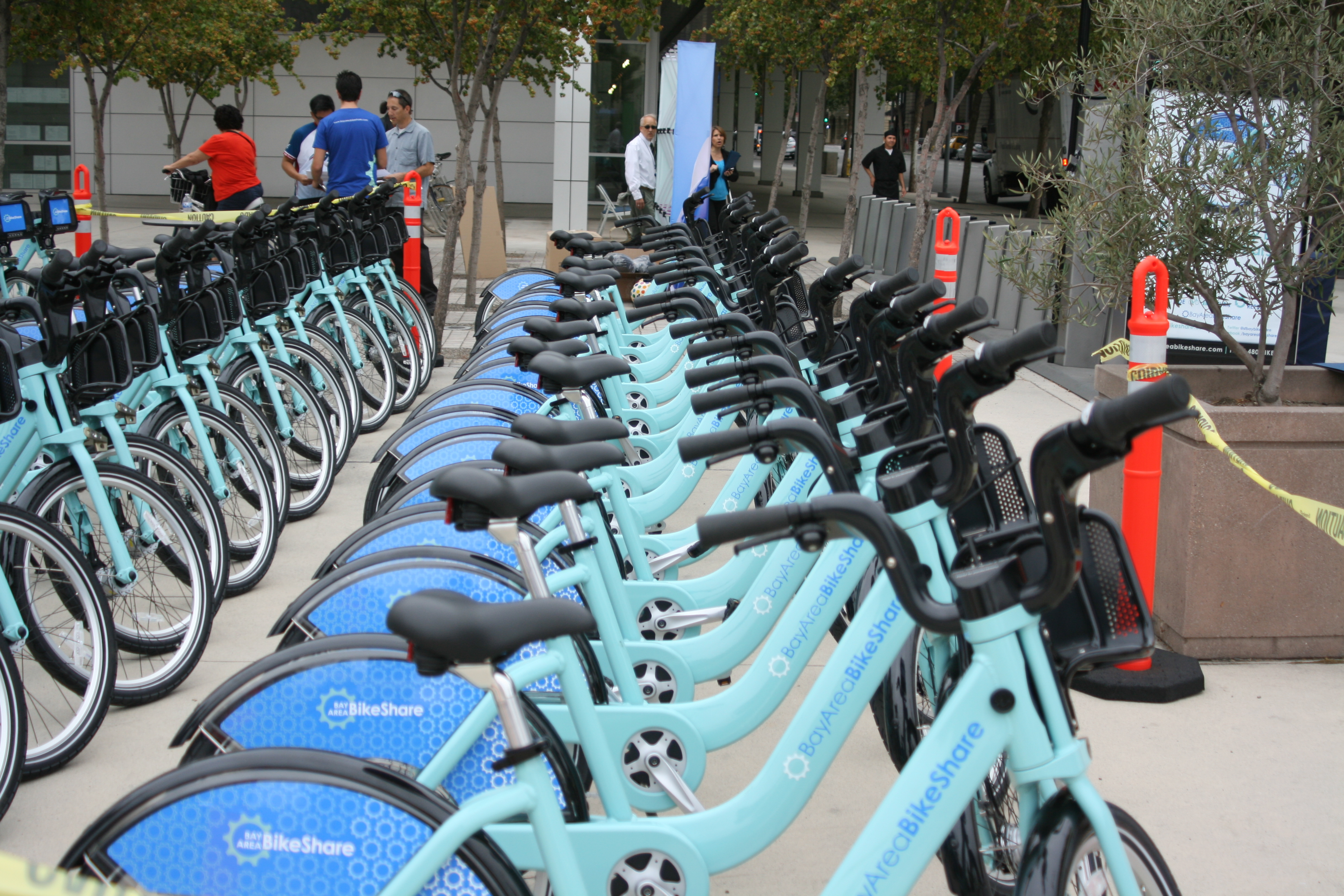
A bike share station in San Jose.

Bay Wheels (launched as Bay Area Bike Share) is a regional public bicycle sharing system that serves the cities of San Francisco, Oakland, Berkeley, Emeryville, and San Jose.

The bicycles are available 24 hours a day, seven days a week to anyone who purchases a membership, with three options, annual fee of US$150, US$29 for a month or US$15 for 24 hours. Any rider may take unlimited trips of up to 30 minutes, as measured from the time the bike is withdrawn from a dock to the time it is returned. Bikes can be picked up at any of the stations using a key fob or electronic code, and dropping them off at any station. Longer trips incur additional fees starting at US$4 for the first additional half-hour, since the idea of bike sharing is to make bicycles available for short trips. A replacement fee of $1,200 is charged if a rented bike is lost.

Several companies previously operated dockless bicycle sharing systems in the Bay Area, however, as of 2024 only Bay Wheels operates dockless bicycles in most of the Bay Area (with some exceptions such as HOPR in Fremont). Dockless systems differ from the docked in that bicycles can be parked freely on the street and do not need to be docked at a designated station.

In 2018, several companies started offering dockless scooter-sharing systems in Bay Area cities such as San Francisco and Oakland. These systems offer electric kick scooters for rent, similar to dockless bicycle sharing systems. Some operators, such as Lime, operate both scooter and bicycle sharing systems. These shared scooters were temporarily banned in San Francisco during summer 2018, but as of October 15, 2018 are available under two operators: Skip and Scoot Networks.

=== Public transportation statistics ===
The average amount of time people spend commuting with public transit in San Francisco, for example to and from work, on a weekday is 77 min. 23% of public transit riders, ride for more than 2 hours every day. The average amount of time people wait at a stop or station for public transit is 13 min, while 17% of riders wait for over 20 minutes on average every day. The average distance people usually ride in a single trip with public transit is 9.1 km, while 20% travel for over 12 km in a single direction.

A 2011 Brookings Institution study ranked the San Francisco MSA and the San Jose MSA sixteenth and second, respectively, on transit coverage to job access. Another nationwide study, conducted by the University of Minnesota in 2014, ranked the San Francisco MSA second and San Jose MSA tenth. In 2012 it was the joint winner of the Sustainable Transport Award. Despite this, the San Francisco Bay Area remains the second most traffic-congested region in the country with a declining per capita use of public transit.

In 2013, the San Francisco-Oakland-Hayward metropolitan statistical area (San Francisco MSA) had the second lowest percentage of workers who commuted by private automobile (69.8 percent), with 7.6 percent of area workers traveling via bus. During the period starting in 2006 and ending in 2013, the San Francisco MSA had the greatest percentage decline of workers commuting by automobile (3.8 percent) among MSAs with more than a half million residents.

== Freeways and highways ==
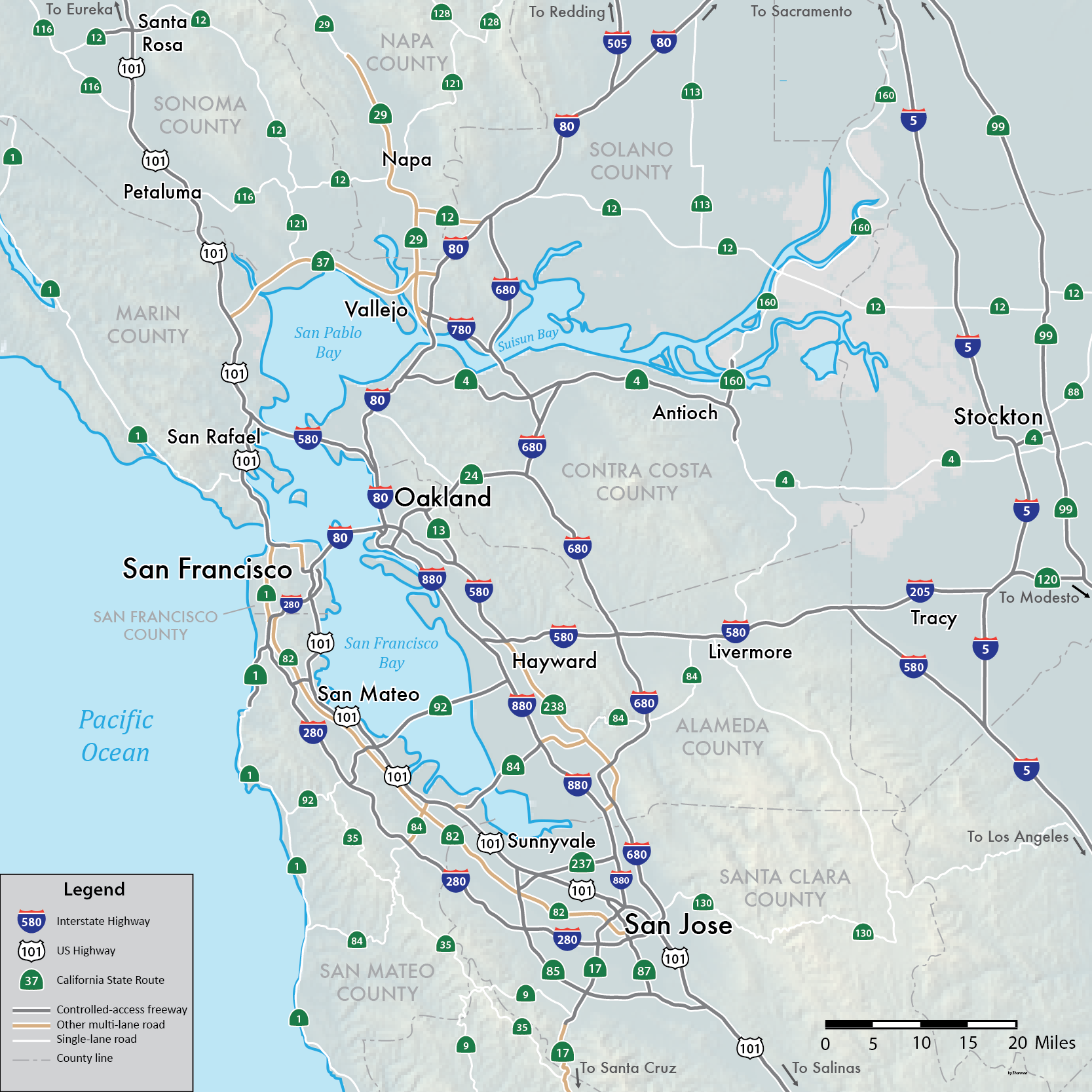
Freeways and highways in the San Francisco Bay Area

The Bay Area possesses an extensive freeway and highway system (although it is not as extensive as Southern California).

=== Trans-bay crossings ===
I-80; San Francisco – Oakland Bay Bridge	The western terminus of I-80 is located in San Francisco as James Lick Skyway (Bayshore Freeway), just west of the San Francisco–Oakland Bay Bridge. The interstate continues to the east over the bridge, connecting to Oakland and the north coast of the East Bay as the Eastshore Freeway, and then on to Sacramento, Reno, and New Jersey.
I-580; Richmond – San Rafael Bridge	This spur route's western terminus is in Marin County. The Interstate crosses the San Pablo Bay over the Richmond-San Rafael Bridge, goes through Richmond as the John T. Knox Freeway, passes through Oakland as the MacArthur Freeway, then continues to Livermore, through the Altamont Pass to Tracy, where it intersects with I-5, thus providing a link with Southern California.
Route 92; San Mateo – Hayward Bridge	Route 92's western terminus is in Half Moon Bay. The two-lane highway crosses the Santa Cruz Mountains, connecting to I-280 and Highway 101 as the J. Arthur Younger Freeway, becoming a freeway as it passes through San Mateo before crossing the San Mateo-Hayward Bridge to Hayward as Jackson Street.
Route 84; Dumbarton Bridge	Route 84 begins at Route 1 (at the Pacific Coast) near San Gregorio State Beach, and crosses the Santa Cruz Mountains on a scenic route between La Honda and Woodside as Woodside Road. It then crosses the Bay over the Dumbarton Bridge from Redwood City to Newark. The route then passes through Fremont as Thornton Avenue and Peralta Boulevard, continuing as Niles Canyon Road to Sunol and Livermore as Vallecitos Road and Isabel Avenue, terminating at I-580 as Airway Boulevard.

=== The Peninsula to the South Bay ===
I-280; Southern, Junipero Serra, & Sinclair Freeways; Highway 101; Bayshore & South Valley Freeways	Eight-lane and, in some parts, 10-lane freeways connecting San Francisco to San Jose through the Peninsula. Highway 101 continues south to Gilroy and Salinas, before continuing to Los Angeles. For most of its route I-280 runs along the foothills of the Santa Cruz Mountains, and is very scenic, while 101 is highly urban.
Route 1 Cabrillo Highway; Route 35; Skyline Boulevard	Two-lane highways also traveling down the Peninsula, Route 1 along the Pacific coast, and Route 35 near the ridge of the Santa Cruz Mountains. Route 1 as Cabrillo Highway connects to Half Moon Bay, Santa Cruz, and Monterey, before continuing to Los Angeles.
Route 9 Route 17	Highways through the Santa Cruz Mountains, connecting the South Bay to Santa Cruz. Part of Route 17 in San Jose is a 6 to 8 lane freeway.
Route 85; West Valley Freeway; Route 237; Southbay Freeway	Six-lane and, in some parts, seven to eight-lane freeways connecting the west Santa Clara Valley to the east Santa Clara Valley, bypassing Downtown San Jose.
Route 87; Guadalupe Freeway	North-south six-lane freeway entirely in San Jose, connecting San Jose International Airport, Downtown to the Almaden Valley. (formerly the Guadalupe Parkway)
Route 152	Two-lane highway from Watsonville, crosses the Santa Cruz Mountains to Gilroy, then crosses the Diablo Range through Pacheco Pass to I-5 near Los Banos.
Route 156	Two-lane highway connecting the Monterey Peninsula from Castroville to northern San Benito County and Route 152.
Route 82; El Camino Real	Highway running from San Jose to Interstate 280 in San Francisco. It is designated a State Route, although it is more similar to an inner-city boulevard, and contains either 2, 4, or 6 lanes. It runs from Daly City in the north through the peninsula and beyond.

The freeway system in Santa Clara county is augmented by the Santa Clara County expressway system.

=== North Bay ===
Highway 101; Redwood Highway; Route 1 Shoreline Highway	Continue north of San Francisco, crossing the Golden Gate Bridge and connecting San Francisco to Marin and Sonoma counties, and eventually to Oregon. They are concurrent between the Golden Gate Bridge and Marin City.
I-505	This interstate highway provides a direct link from I-80 in Vacaville in Solano County to I-5, bypassing Sacramento.
Route 29	Four-lane expressway connecting Interstate 80 in Vallejo in Solano County as Sonoma Boulevard to the towns of American Canyon and Napa. North of Napa, Route 29 is a two-lane rural highway through the towns of the Napa Valley, California's Wine Country, to Clear Lake.
Route 37	Four- and two-lane expressway connecting Highway 101 in Novato with I-80 in Vallejo, along the northern shore of San Pablo Bay.
Route 12; Sonoma Highway	A highway connecting Santa Rosa with suburbs to the west and I-80 through Sonoma and Napa to the east.

=== East Bay ===
I-680; Sinclair Freeway; I-880; Nimitz Freeway	Two interstate highways that travel up the East Bay from San Jose, 880 close to the bay to Oakland and 680 inland from San Jose north through Fremont, Pleasanton and Concord; then crosses the Benicia-Martinez Bridge and ends at I-80 in Fairfield.
I-980; Grover Shafter Freeway; Route 24; Grover Shafter Freeway	A freeway entirely in Downtown Oakland and begins at I-880 and travels north to become Route 24 at I-580. The freeway continues north as Route 24, which is a state highway that begins at I-580 in Oakland and travels east through the Caldecott Tunnel to I-680 in Walnut Creek.
I-205	This interstate highway's western terminus is at I-580 in Alameda County just west of the San Joaquin County line. I-205 heads east through Tracy to I-5, providing access from the Bay Area to Stockton and the northern portion of the San Joaquin Valley.
Route 13; Warren Freeway	A highway entirely in the Oakland Hills and travels north from I-580 to Route 24, where the freeway portion ends. Beyond SR 24, Route 13 is Berkeley's Ashby Avenue.
I-238; Route 238; Mission Boulevard	An arterial from Fremont to Hayward, along the base of the hills, then becomes a freeway near Oakland.
Route 4 John Muir Parkway; California Delta Highway	Western terminus at I-80 in Hercules, travels east through Martinez, Pittsburg, and Antioch, where the freeway portion ends. The highway continues to Brentwood and east to Stockton.

=== Named interchanges ===
The Alemany Maze is the interchange between the James Lick Freeway (Highway 101) and I-280.

The MacArthur Maze is the interchange between the Eastshore Freeway (I-80 east / I-580 west), Nimitz Freeway (I-880 south), and MacArthur Freeway (I-580 east) at the east end of the Bay Bridge (I-80 west).

The Joe Colla Interchange is the interchange between Highway 101, I-280, and I-680. Both I-280 and I-680's southern termini is located as this interchange.

=== San Francisco streets ===
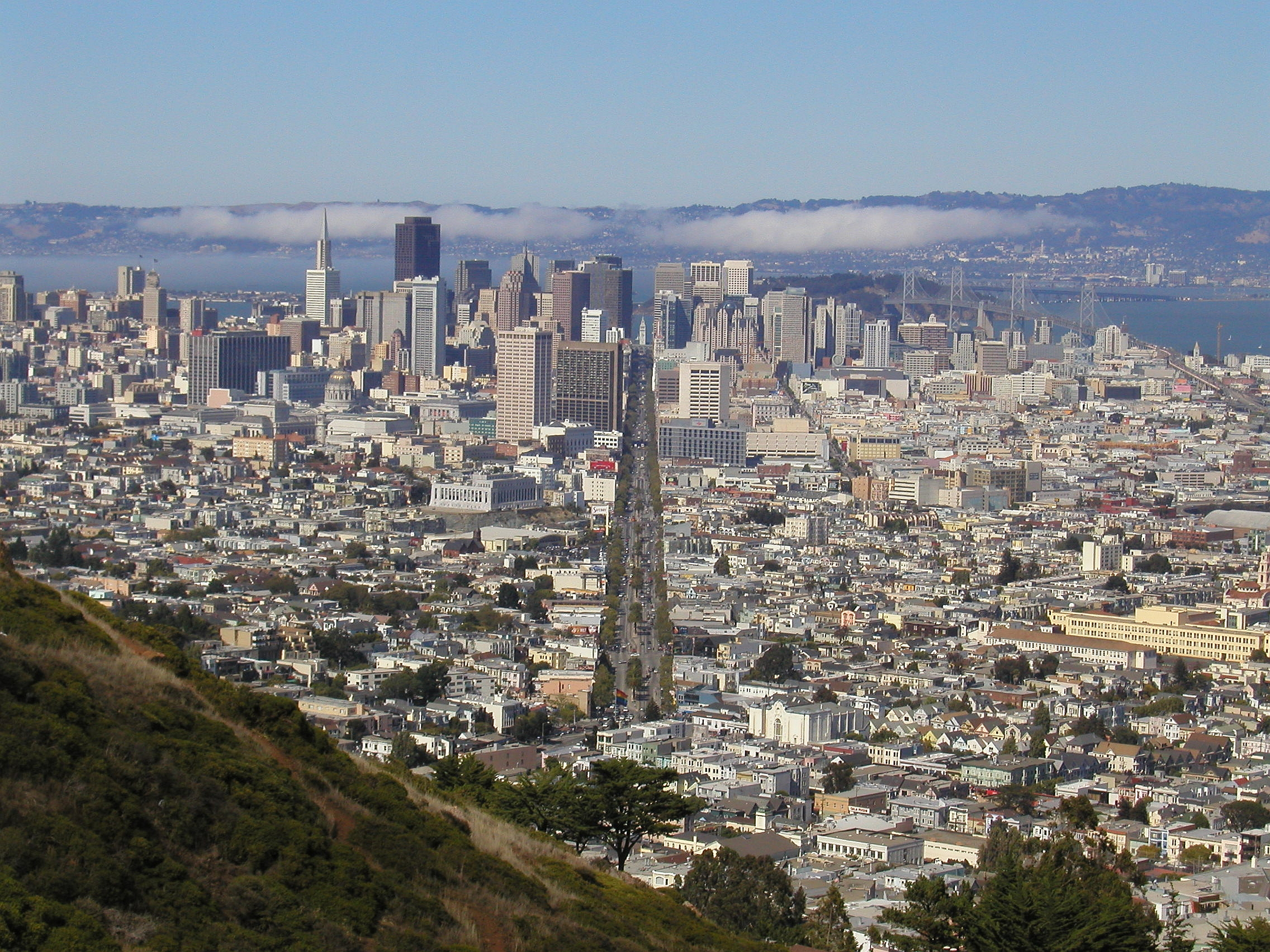
Market Street, the main thoroughfare in San Francisco, as seen from Twin Peaks.

Due to its unique geography, and the freeway revolts of the late 1950s, San Francisco is one of the few American cities served primarily by arterial roads for most trips within city limits, rather than a freeway network supplemented by arterial roads.

Interstate 80 begins at the approach to the Bay Bridge and is the only direct automobile link to the East Bay. U.S. Route 101 connects to the western terminus of Interstate 80 and provides access to the south of the city along San Francisco Bay toward Silicon Valley. Northward, the routing for U.S. 101 uses arterial streets Mission Street (northbound) and South Van Ness Avenue (southbound), Van Ness Avenue, Lombard Street, Richardson Avenue, and Doyle Drive to connect to the Golden Gate Bridge, the only direct automobile link to Marin County and the North Bay.

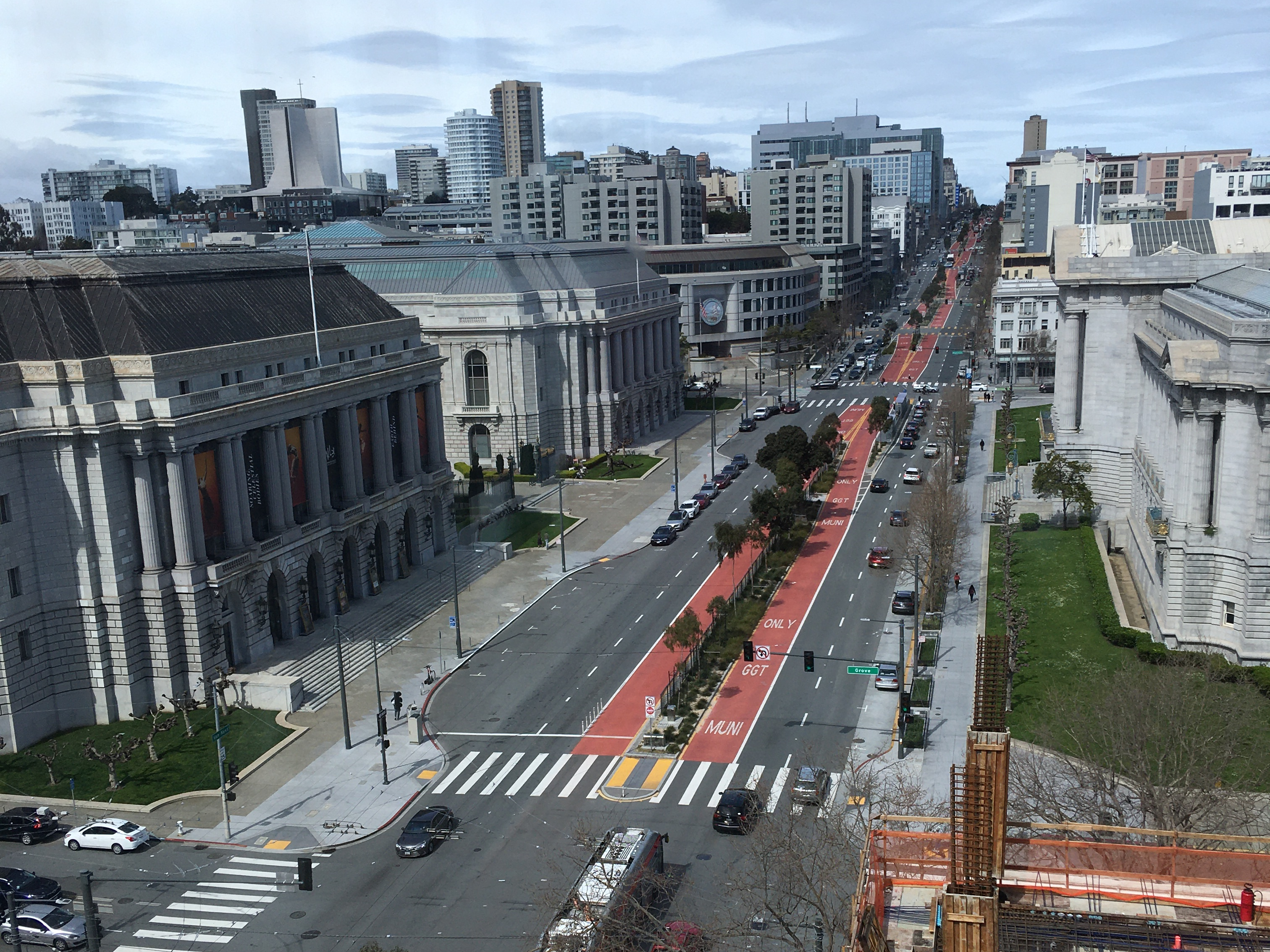
Van Ness Avenue near San Francisco City Hall in 2024

State Route 1 also enters San Francisco from the north via the Golden Gate Bridge, but turns south away from the routing of U.S. 101, first onto Park Presidio Blvd through Golden Gate Park, and then bisecting the west side of the city as the 19th Avenue arterial thoroughfare, joining with Interstate 280 at the city's southern border. Interstate 280 continues south from San Francisco. Interstate 280 also turns to the east along the southern edge of the city, terminating just south of the Bay Bridge in the South of Market neighborhood. After the 1989 Loma Prieta earthquake, city leaders decided to demolish the Embarcadero Freeway, and a portion of the Central Freeway, converting them into street-level boulevards.

Route 35 enters the city from the south as Skyline Boulevard, following city streets until it terminates at its intersection with Highway 1. Route 82 enters San Francisco from the south as Mission Street, following the path of the historic El Camino Real and terminating shortly thereafter at its intersection of I-280. Major east–west thoroughfares include Geary Boulevard, the Lincoln Way/Fell Street corridor, and Market Street/Portola Drive.

The Western Terminus of the historic transcontinental Lincoln Highway, the first road across America, is in San Francisco's Lincoln Park.

=== Highway revolts ===
San Francisco is the birthplace of highway revolts in the United States, and highways have historically been approached with hostility by locals across the Bay Area. Protests have occurred against highways as early as 1955, and these protests eventually cancelled the construction of additional highways through Golden Gate Park and the Presidio, and further led to the demolishing of the Embarcadero Freeway in the early 1990s. Protests additionally occurred throughout the East Bay, cancelling projects such as the Ashby Freeway through Berkeley and the Richmond Boulevard Freeway in Oakland.

== Bridges ==
1. / Richmond-San Rafael Bridge; 2. / Golden Gate Bridge; 3. / San Francisco-Oakland Bay Bridge; 4. / San Mateo-Hayward Bridge; 5. / Dumbarton Bridge; 6. / Carquinez Bridge; 7. / Benicia–Martinez Bridge; 8. / Antioch Bridge; Arrows show toll direction and plazas

Due to the central location of the San Francisco Bay Area, eight toll bridges cross the Bay or Bay tributaries. Each of the bridges collect separate tolls, and all of them accept payment through FasTrak, an electronic toll collection system used in the state of California. Seven of these eight bridges are owned directly by the state of California, while the Golden Gate Bridge is owned and operated by the Golden Gate Bridge, Highway and Transportation District.

Bridge Name	Picture	Connects	Length	Highway
Antioch Bridge		Antioch in Contra Costa County with Sacramento County	1.8 mi (2.9 km)	SR 160
Benicia-Martinez Bridge		Solano County with Contra Costa County	1.7 mi (2.7 km)	I-680
Carquinez Bridge		Vallejo in Solano County with Crockett in Contra Costa County	0.66 mi (1.06 km)	I-80
Dumbarton Bridge		Menlo Park in San Mateo County with Fremont in Alameda County	1.63 mi (2.62 km)	SR 84
Golden Gate Bridge		San Francisco with Marin County	1.7 mi (2.7 km)	US 101, SR 1
Richmond-San Rafael Bridge		Richmond in Contra Costa County with San Rafael in Marin County	5.5 mi (8.9 km)	I-580
San Francisco–Oakland Bay Bridge		San Francisco with Oakland and the East Bay	4.46 mi (7.18 km)	I-80
San Mateo-Hayward Bridge		San Francisco Peninsula with the East Bay	7 mi (11 km)	SR 92

== San Francisco Bay Trail ==
The San Francisco Bay Trail alignment.

The San Francisco Bay Trail is a bicycle and pedestrian trail that will eventually allow continuous travel around the shoreline of San Francisco Bay. As of 2016, 350 miles (560 km) of trail have been completed, while the full plan calls for a trail over 500 miles (800 km) long that link the shoreline of nine counties, passing through 47 cities and crossing seven toll bridges. Sections of the Bay Trail exist in all nine Bay Area counties. The longest continuous segments include 26 miles (42 km) primarily on gravel levees between East Palo Alto and San Jose in Santa Clara County; 25 miles (40 km) in San Mateo County between Millbrae and San Carlos; 17 miles (27 km) in central Alameda County from San Leandro to Hayward; and 15 miles (24 km) along the shoreline and on city streets through Richmond in Contra Costa County. The northernmost trail section passes through San Pablo Bay National Wildlife Refuge.

== Seaports ==
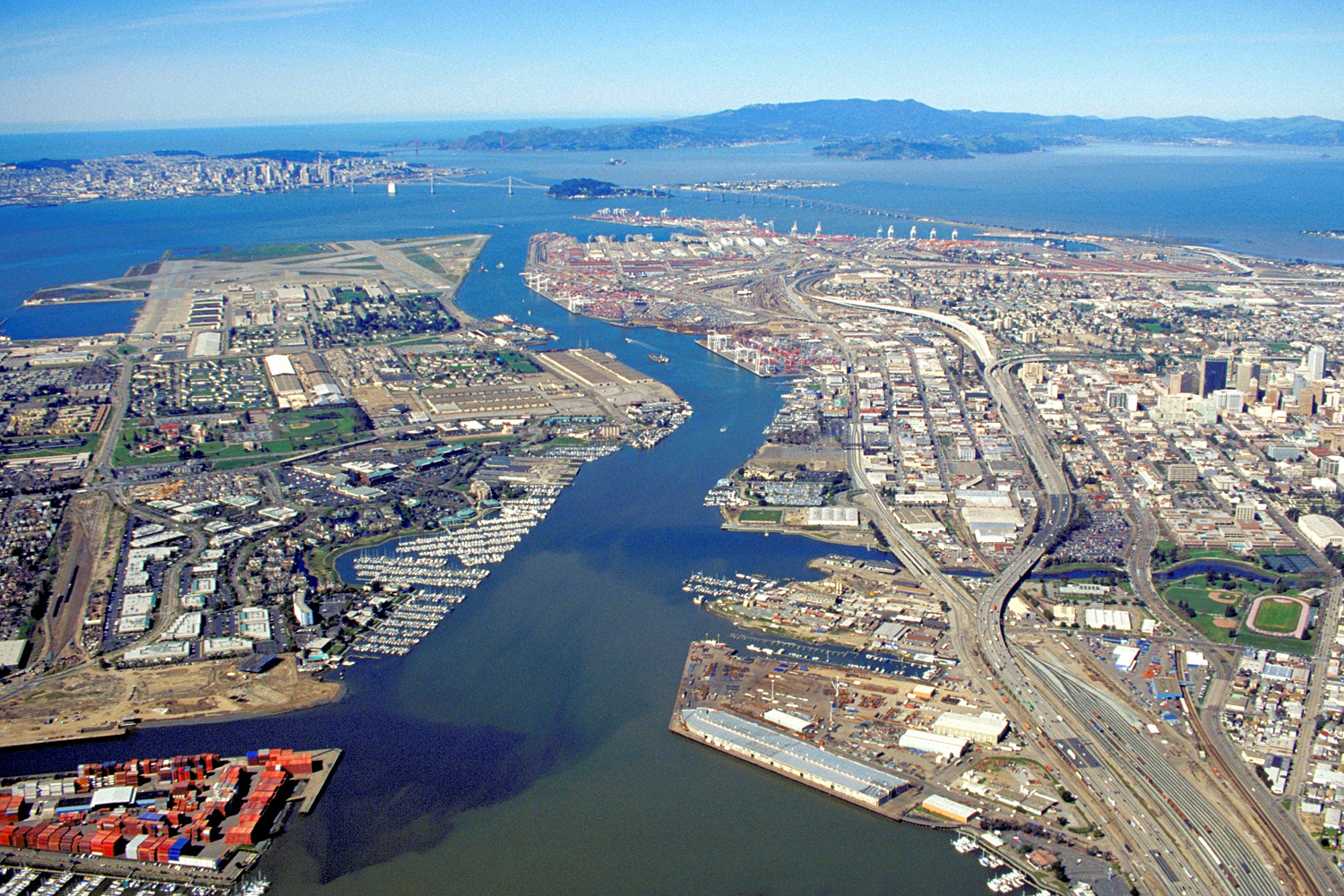
Aerial view of the Port of Oakland

The Port of San Francisco was once the largest and busiest seaport on the West Coast. It featured rows of piers perpendicular to the shore, where cargo from the moored ships was handled by cranes and manual labor and transported to nearby warehouses. The port handled cargo to and from trans-Pacific and Atlantic destinations, and was the West Coast center of the lumber trade. The 1934 West Coast Longshore Strike, an important episode in the history of the American labor movement, brought most ports to a standstill. The advent of container shipping made pier-based ports obsolete, and most commercial berths moved to the Port of Oakland and Port of Richmond. A few active berths specializing in break bulk cargo remain alongside the Islais Creek Channel.

The port currently uses Pier 35 to handle the 60–80 cruise ship calls and 200,000 passengers that come to San Francisco. Itineraries from San Francisco usually include round trip cruises to Alaska and Mexico. The James R. Herman Cruise Terminal Project at Pier 27 opened in 2014 as a replacement. The previous primary terminal at Pier 35 had neither the sufficient capacity to allow for the increasing length and passenger capacity of new cruise ships nor the amenities needed for an international cruise terminal.

On March 16, 2013, Princess Cruises Grand Princess became the first ship to home port in San Francisco year round. The ship offers cruises to Alaska, California Coasts, Hawaii, and Mexico. Grand Princess will be stationed in San Francisco until April 2014. Princess will also operate other ships during the summer of 2014, making it the only cruise line home porting year round in San Francisco.

== See also ==
- List of San Francisco Bay Area trains
- Plug-in electric vehicles in California § San Francisco Bay Area
