= Vacaville Transportation Center =

Bus station in Vacaville, California, United States

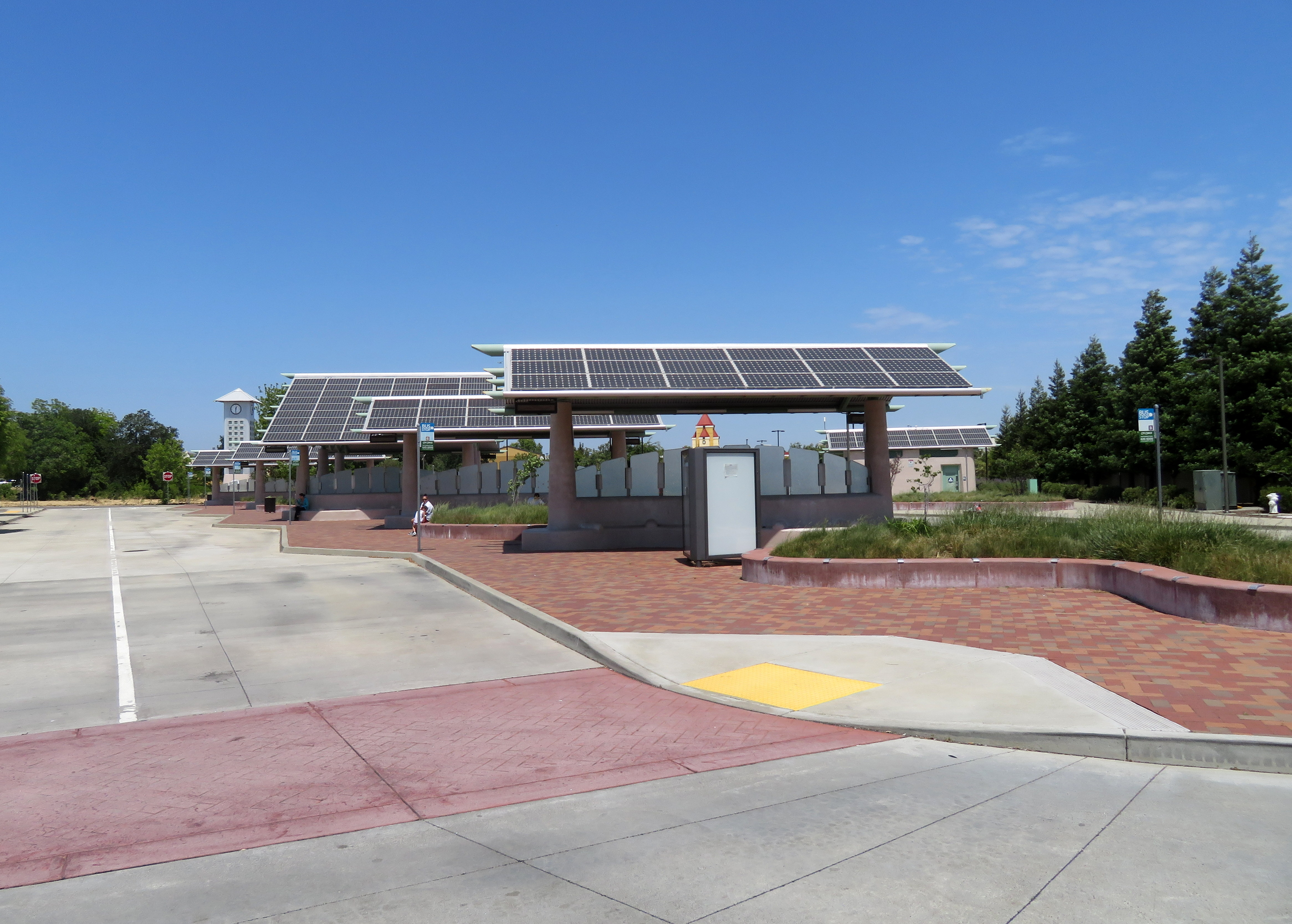
- Bus bays at Vacaville Transportation Center in 2019

General information
- Location: Allison Drive and Travis Way; Vacaville, California; United States
- Coordinates: 38.358575°N 121.96509°W
- Owner: City of Vacaville
- Lines: FAST: B Vacaville City Coach: 2, 3, 4, 5, 6 Yolobus: 220

Construction
- Parking: 225; 22 vanpool spots
- Accessible: Yes
Location

Vacaville Transportation Center also known as the Vacaville Intermodal Station is a bus station in Vacaville, California, United States. It is served by Fairfield and Suisun Transit (FAST), Vacaville City Coach, and Yolobus.

== Transit ==
The bus station is served by SolTrans Blue Line between the Walnut Creek BART station, Benicia Industrial Park, Fairfield Transportation Center, Vacaville Transportation Center, Dixon and the Davis Mondavi Center Monday through Saturday. Yolobus route 138 at the Mondavi Center connects to the UC Davis Medical Center in Davis.

Local bus service is provided by Vacaville City Coach on lines 1, 3, 4, 5, and 6 which connect the center to Leisure Town, downtown Vacaville, Browns Valley, Kaiser Vacaville, Nut Tree, and Vacaville Transit Plaza.

== History ==
In 2011 Phase 1 of the project was completed for $12.6 million. Phase 2 was to have added a $20.5 million 400-stall parking garage but this was later changed to a $1 million 136-space surface lot. In 2013 the center received $450,000 to improve sidewalks and build a bikepath. The center has no water fountains nor bathroom facilities.
