= Suisun–Fairfield station =

Train station in Suisun City, California, United States

Suisun–Fairfield, CA
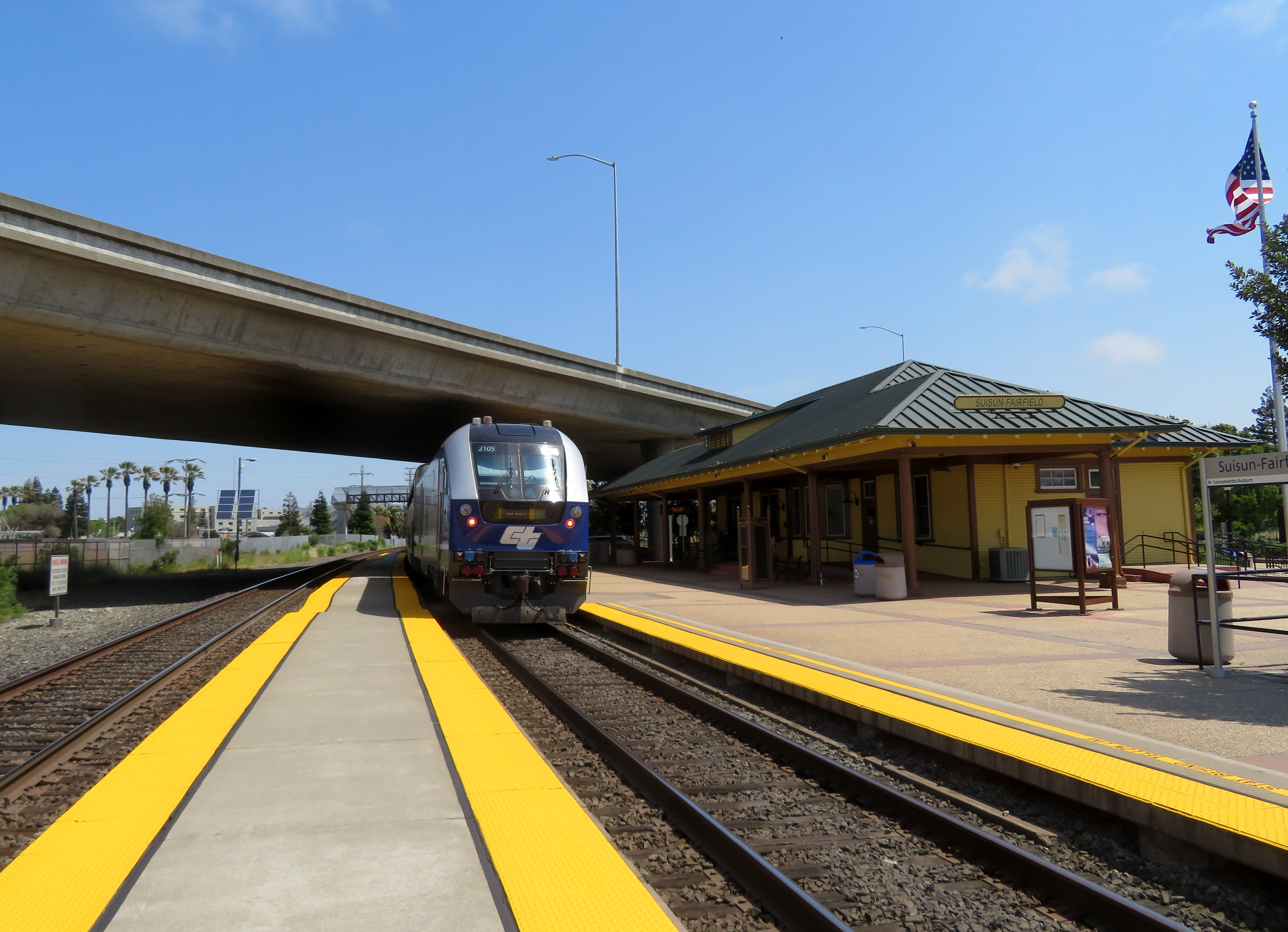
- Capitol Corridor train leaving Suisun–Fairfield station in 2019

General information
- Location: 177 Main Street; Suisun City, California; United States
- Coordinates: 38°14′36″N 122°02′29″W
- Owner: City of Suisun (station); Union Pacific (platforms and tracks)
- Line: UP Martinez Subdivision
- Platforms: 1 side platform, 1 island platform
- Tracks: 2
- Connections: Delta Breeze: 50; FAST: 5, GX; SolTrans: R; VINE: 21; Greyhound Lines

Construction
- Parking: 272 spaces
- Cycle facilities: Yes
- Accessible: Yes

Other information
- Station code: Amtrak: SUI

History
- Opened: 1904
- Rebuilt: 1992

Passengers
- FY 2025: 65,360 (Amtrak)

Services
Preceding station	Amtrak	Following station
Martinez toward San Jose	Capitol Corridor	Fairfield–Vacaville toward Auburn
California Zephyr does not stop here
Coast Starlight does not stop here
Former services
Preceding station	Amtrak	Following station
Martinez toward Emeryville	California Zephyr Until 1998	Davis toward Chicago
Martinez toward Los Angeles	Spirit of California 1981–1983	Davis toward Sacramento
Preceding station	Southern Pacific Railroad	Following station
Teal toward Oakland Pier	Shasta Route	Tolenas toward Portland
Teal toward Oakland Pier	Overland Route	Tolenas toward Ogden
Subeet toward Napa Junction	Napa Junction – Suisun	Terminus
Location

Suisun–Fairfield station is an Amtrak station in Suisun City, California. It serves both Suisun City and nearby Fairfield. It is served by the Amtrak Capitol Corridor commuter rail line between Auburn and San Jose through Oakland.

Connecting bus service is provided by Fairfield and Suisun Transit, SolTrans R line to the El Cerrito del Norte BART station, Rio Vista Delta Breeze, and VINE Transit. The station is under the State Route 12 overpass.

The current station opened in March 1914 and is the second depot to serve these two towns. The one-story wood-frame depot is one of two dozen “colonnade style” stations erected by the Southern Pacific Railroad. The design takes its name from the Tuscan columns used in the long porch that stretches out along the platform. Beneath its wide roof, passengers are protected from inclement weather. The colonnade style mixed elements of Colonial Revival and Arts and Crafts architecture.

In the 1970s, the depot fell into disrepair, but in the 1990s, in an effort to create a more inviting gateway to town, the Suisun City Redevelopment Authority gained control of the structure and used state transportation funds to carry out a full rehabilitation, which included a new landscaped courtyard.

Until 1998, the California Zephyr also stopped here. It also served the Spirit of California until it was discontinued in 1983.
