= Fairfield Transportation Center =

Bus station in Fairfield, California, United States

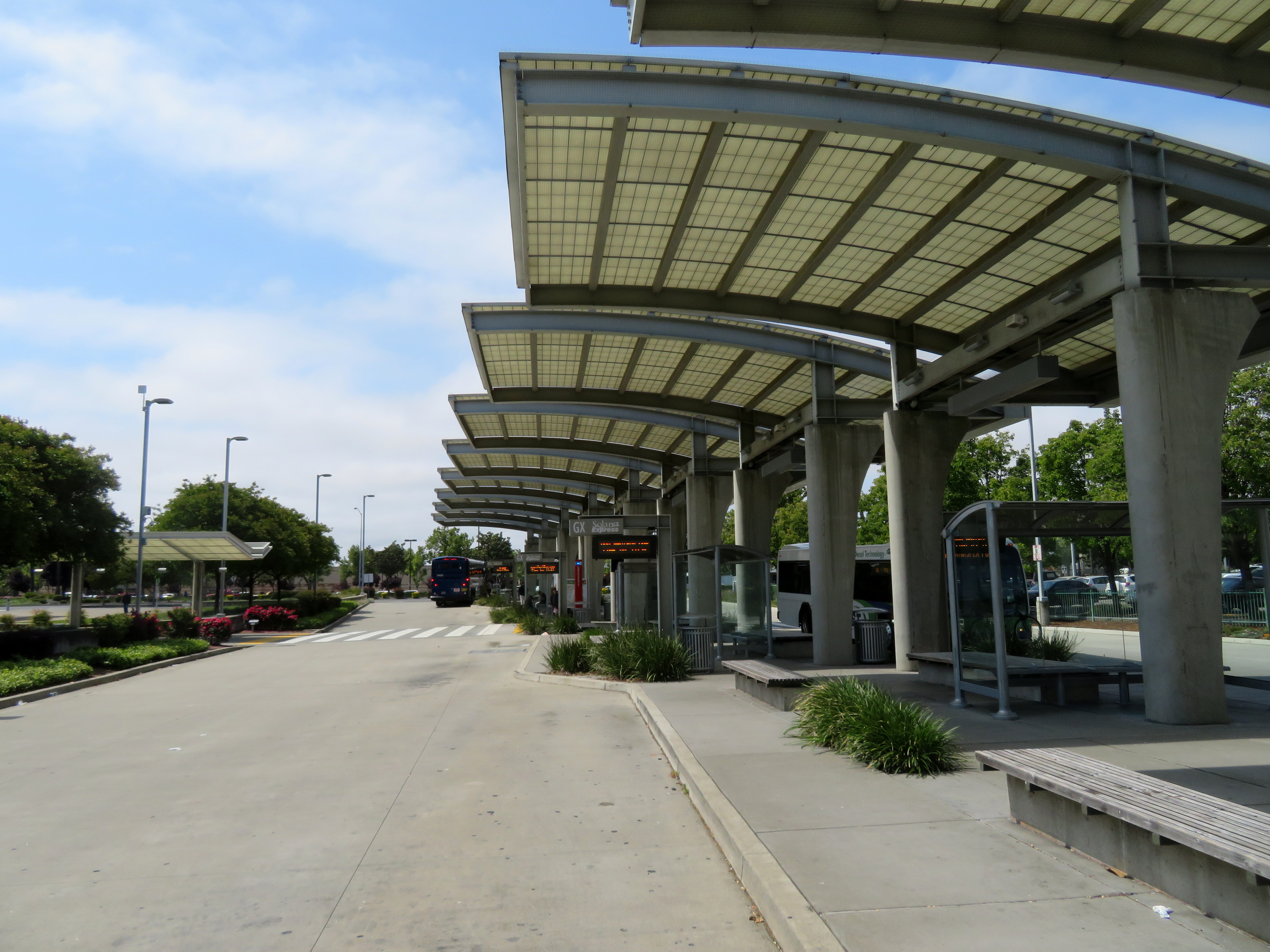
- Fairfield Transportation Center in May 2019

General information
- Location: Cadenasso Drive & Auto Mall Parkway; Fairfield, California; United States
- Coordinates: 38.24882°N 122.06845°W
- Owner: City of Fairfield
- Lines: FAST: 1, 3, 5, 7, Blue, Green; Rio Vista Delta Breeze: 50; SolTrans: Red; VINE: 21

Construction
- Parking: 640
- Cycle facilities: 16 lockers 10 racks
- Accessible: Yes
Location

The Fairfield Transportation Center or FTC is a bus station in Fairfield, California, United States. The facility serves as a bus hub for transportation on local, commuter, and long-distance bus services. There are plans to expand the center. Casual carpooling is also practiced here.

== Transit ==
The hub is served by Fairfield and Suisun Transit (FAST) bus service predominantly. Solano Express intercity commuter routes also stop here. FAST operates the Blue Line north to Sacramento (Davis on weekends) and south to Walnut Creek station Monday through Saturday. FAST also operates the Green Express Line south to El Cerrito del Norte BART station Monday through Friday. SolTrans operates the Red Line to El Cerrito del Norte BART station via Vallejo Monday through Saturday. Rio Vista Delta Breeze operates Line 50 to the towns of Rio Vista and Isleton. Lastly Napa VINE runs express bus route 21 to Napa.

== History ==
The center was designed to "instill civic pride" and provide transit alternatives for the surrounding community. Parking is in high demand here and some people park in nearby shopping centers risking being towed. In 2012 the City of Fairfield planned on expanding the site by adding 1,000 more parking spaces and moving the vanpooling to a site 1/3 miles away. In 2015, parking fees were debated to mitigate overcrowding at the park and ride lot. A petition was circulated by residents who protested the US$50 a month parking fees with $5 daily parking; the city council was split on the decision. There is electric vehicle charging here provided by Tesla. In 2016 it was reported that a colorful glass-styled 1,200 space parking garage was to be added by 2019. The city has struggled to find land fit for development of additional parking.

== See also ==
- Fairfield-Vacaville station
- Suisun-Fairfield station
