= Helbiz =

Italian-American transportation company

Helbiz, Inc.
- Industry: Dockless electric scooter sharing, dockless bike sharing, Car sharing
- Founders: Salvatore Palella
- Headquarters: New York, New York, United States
- Area served: Europe, North America
- Key people: Salvatore Palella (CEO) Jonathan Hannestad (COO) Nemanja Stancic (CTO)
- Website: Official Twitter

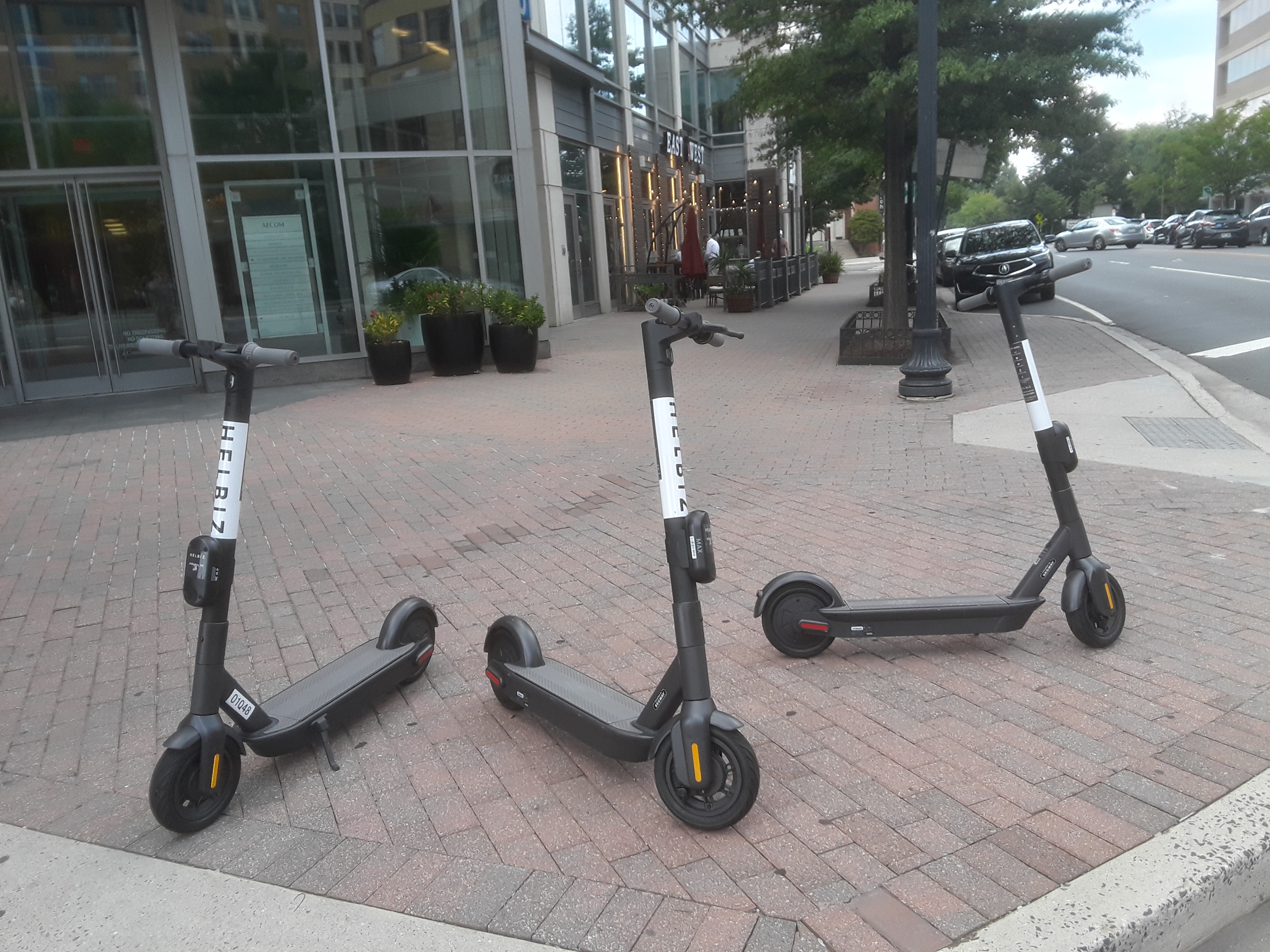
Three Helbiz scooters on a street corner in Clarendon, Arlington, Virginia

Helbiz, Inc. is an Italian-American intra-urban transportation company headquartered in New York City with an aim to solve the first mile/last mile transportation problem of high-traffic urban areas around the world.

Helbiz was founded on 16 October 2015 by Italian serial entrepreneur, Salvatore Palella and is the first company to introduce the shared electric scooter model in Italy as early as October 2018 through legalization and regulation of the electric scooters in Italy.

== Operations ==
The Helbiz team acts as an intermediary between peers that use the app by monitoring the vehicles throughout the day and collecting them in the night.

== IPO and news ==
Helbiz announced the intention to file a dual list initial public offering on NASDAQ and on the Borsa Italiana AIM Italia exchange.

In August 2019, Helbiz announced it has completed the initial investment round for gross proceeds of approximately $7.13 million. TriPoint Global Equities, LLC was the placement agent.

In October 2019, Forever Sharing, a China-based leader in the production of electric smart mobility vehicles and a subsidiary of the Zhonglu Group, acquired 5% of the share capital of Helbiz, investing 8 million dollars in the company. The investment values Helbiz at 160 million dollars. As a result of the partnership, Forever Sharing will supply Helbiz with 20,000 electric bicycles and e-scooters by the end of 2019 and beginning of 2020 to deploy globally. IPO didn't take place in 2019 and in 2020.

In June 2020, in New York Southern District Court a class action case was filed against Helbiz Inc. and its management team. A group of plaintiffs sued Helbiz, which claimed to be developing a transportation rental platform, after purchasing “HelbizCoin” cryptocurrency via the company's ICO. The plaintiffs claimed they were deceived into purchasing cryptocurrency as part of a company's “pump and dump” investment scheme

In January 2021 the court ordered the Helbiz Coin is an investment in a common enterprise and Helbiz coin is a security, but the plaintiffs failed jurisdiction.

In February 2021, Helbiz, Inc. announced a merger agreement With GreenVision Acquisition Corp. (Nasdaq: GRNV), which was finished in August 2021. Helbiz is a Nasdaq-listed public company under the new ticker symbol "HLBZ". The combined company continues to operate under the current Helbiz management team, led by chief executive officer Salvatore Palella. Company valuation at the start was $308m.

In October 2021, The Second U.S. Circuit Court of Appeals revived a lawsuit against Helbiz. Helbiz investors claimed they were defrauded into buying the HelbizCoin cryptocurrency as part of a "pump and dump" scheme.

== Partnerships and events ==
In January 2019, a new joint venture between Helbiz and Telepass formed, allowing riders to rent and pay HELBIZ's e-scooters directly on Telepass Pay. The Telepass Mobile App allows users to pay for parking, fuel and other mobility costs.

In February 2019, Helbiz partnered with Matchless to launch a runway show with electric scooters, promoting eco-friendly products and services. In March 2019, Helbiz partnered with Moovit, a Mobility as a service app that aggregates public transportation services of cities,

The partnership is aimed to integrate Helbiz electric scooters into the existing public transportation network.

In July 2019, Helbiz participated in the New York City E-Prix racing event in Red Hook, Brooklyn for the finale of the ABB FIA Formula E Championship. At the end of the event Helbiz offered New Yorkers the chance to ride its electric scooters on the racing track on the “New Yorkers on Track” experience.

Helbiz partnered with Ehang UAV to establish an aerial ridesharing network of 2 passenger drones. This Helbiz service partnered with the governor of Antigua and Barbuda to operate a pilot program of drone taxis on the Caribbean islands.

In September 2019, Helbiz presents the e-bike "Greta", in homage to the young Swedish activist Greta Thunberg. It was presented on the "Green Carpet" of the final ceremony of the Milan Fashion Week. The latest generation assisted bicycle has a 250 W motor and a 14 AH battery to guarantee a range of up to 80 km with a full load and a maximum speed of 25 km / h. In the frame, reinforced in steel, there is also a GPS system that allows the location and subsequent unlocking of the units through the mobile application, similar to what already happens with scooters.

In May 2020, Helbiz launched Helbiz Unlimited, a subscription service that offers unlimited 30-minute trips on its e-bikes and e-scooters, as one of the post-COVID-19 initiative. This service was partnered with the Italian government's COVID-19 Task Force.

In December, 2020, Helbiz acquired Skip, the first permitted shared scooter service in the United States. In August 2021, Skip entered Chapter 7 bankruptcy and began dissolution.

In January, 2021, Helbiz was part of the Inauguration of President-Elect Joe Biden and Vice President Kamala Harris as corporate sponsors of the Inauguration.

In February, 2021, Helbiz, Inc. announces merger agreement with GreenVision Acquisition Corp. to become the first micro-mobility company listed on NASDAQ.

In June 2021, Helbiz announced some important partnerships. With Vox, Helbiz created a partnership introducing an "experiential tourism" bringing culture and sustainable mobility together enabling easy access between different points of interest in the city by electric scooter or bike.

Helbiz joined forces with Alipay to offer a safe and convenient mobility service for tourism, safely and in conjunction with the kick-off of the European Championships.

The Miami FC and Helbiz announced the extension of their exclusive partnership, which includes the continuation of its jersey sponsorship on all Miami FC match kits.

Helbiz Media announced the acquisition of OTT rights for the Serie B Championship for the next 3 seasons (2021–2022, 2022-2023 and 2023–2024) for broadcasting in Italy, and that it has been chosen by the Serie B League as the exclusive partner for the distribution and marketing of the Serie B Championship rights throughout the world.
