= Vacaville City Coach =

Bus transportation provider in Vacaville, California

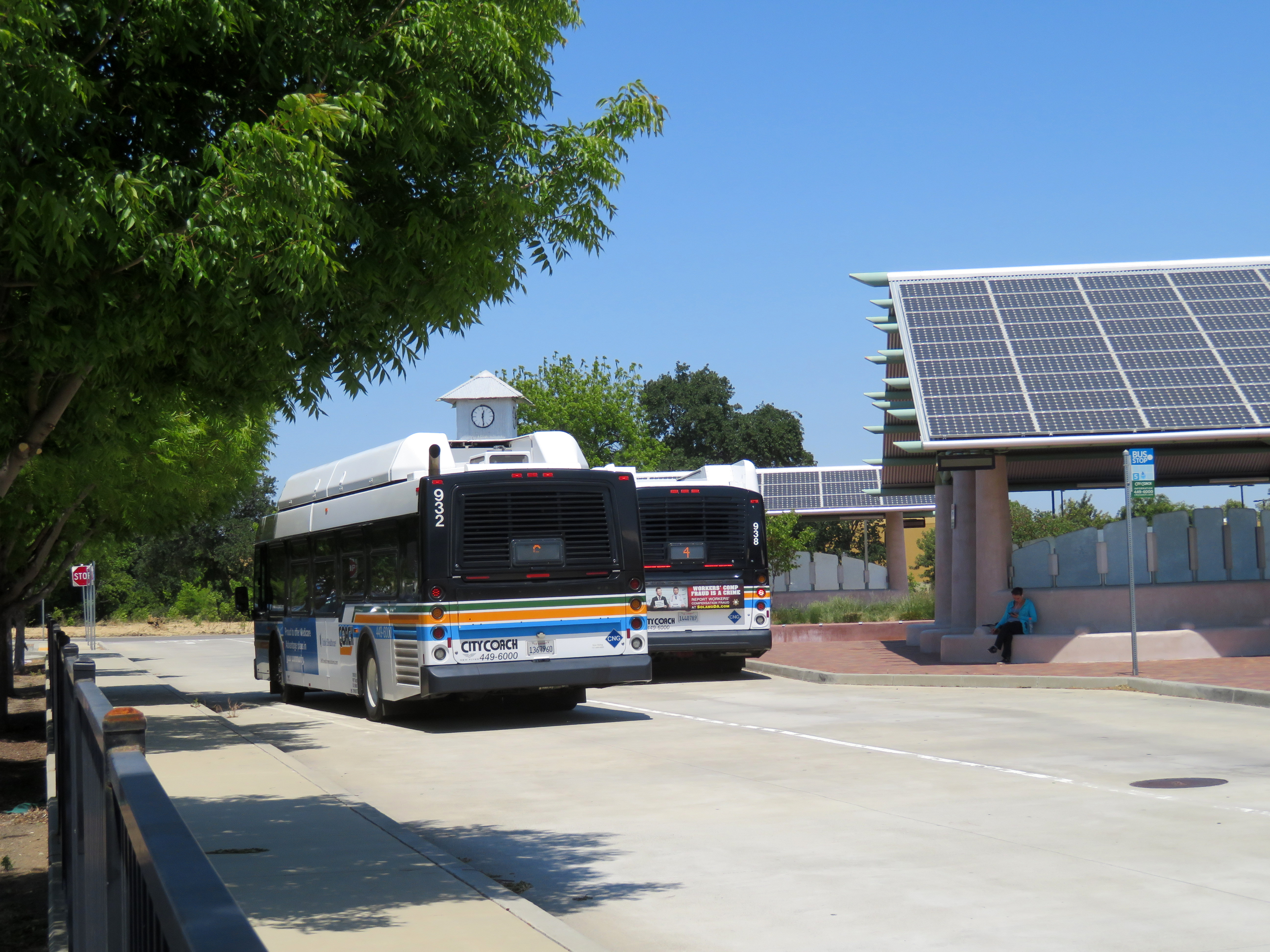
- City Coach buses at Vacaville Transportation Center
- Headquarters: 650 Merchant St., Vacaville, CA 95688
- Service area: Vacaville, California
- Service type: bus service
- Routes: 6
- Fleet: 18 buses
- Operator: First Transit
- Website: www.citycoach.com

Vacaville City Coach runs local fixed route bus service in the city of Vacaville, California. Vacaville City Coach also administers two commuter services operated by Fairfield and Suisun Transit (FAST) from the Vacaville Transportation Center to Davis, Dixon, Fairfield, Pleasant Hill, Sacramento, and Walnut Creek.

== Route list ==
- 4- Ulatis Center to Solano Community College
- 5- Ulatis Center to Andrews Park via Alamo/Nut Tree
- 6- Ulatis Center to Andrews Park via Monte Vista/Browns
- 8- Ulatis Center to Andrews Park via Peabody/Youngsdale
