= Fairfield–Vacaville station =

Train station in Fairfield, California

Fairfield–Vacaville
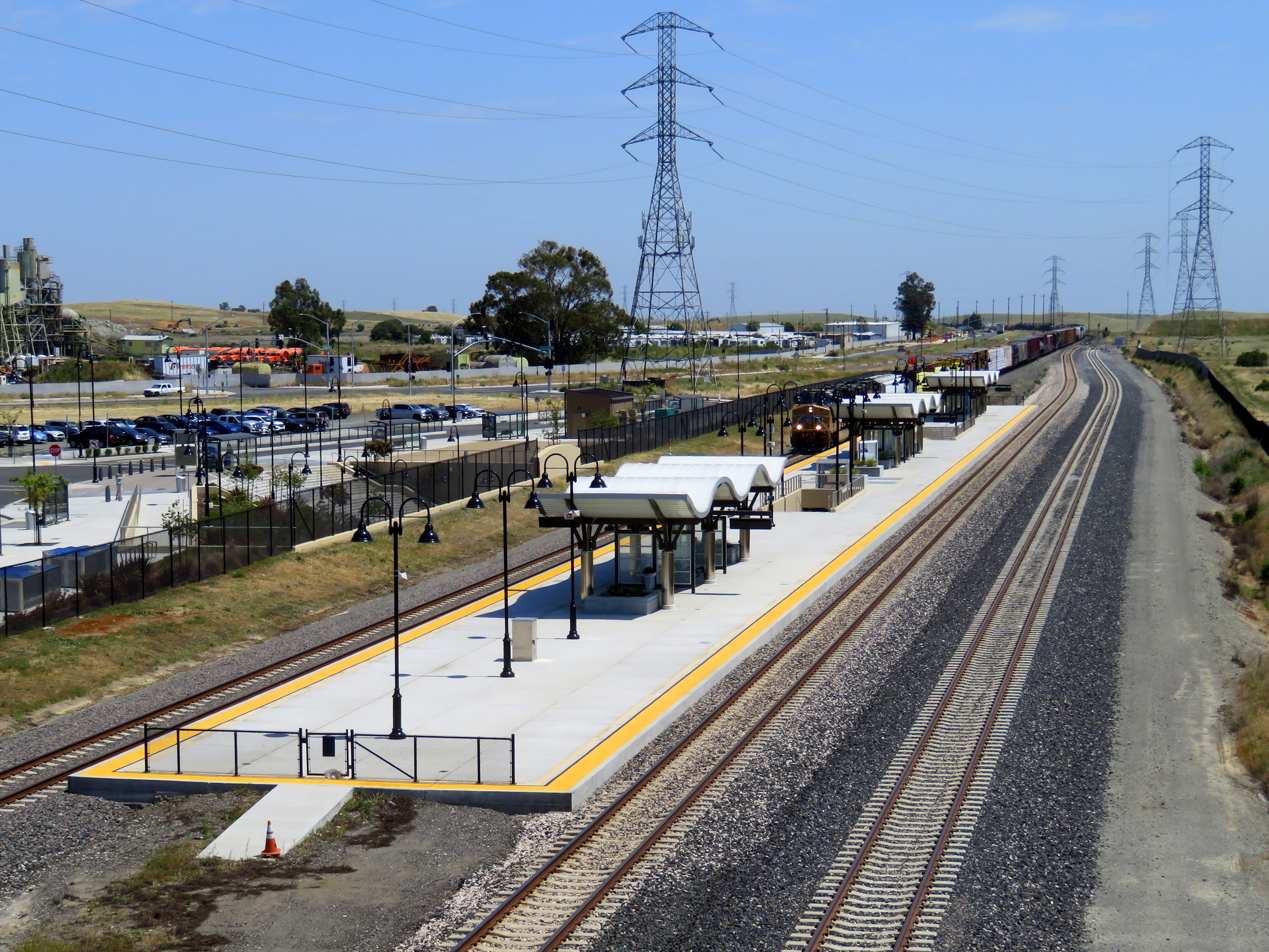
- Fairfield–Vacaville Hannigan station in May 2019

General information
- Other names: Fairfield–Vacaville Hannigan Station
- Location: 4921 Vanden Road; Fairfield, California; United States
- Coordinates: 38.285443°N 121.967967°W
- Owner: City of Fairfield
- Line: UP Martinez Subdivision
- Platforms: 1 island platform
- Tracks: 3
- Connections: FAST: 2

Construction
- Parking: Yes
- Cycle facilities: Racks, lockers
- Accessible: Yes

Other information
- Station code: Amtrak: FFV

History
- Opened: November 13, 2017

Passengers
- FY 2025: 74,502 (Amtrak)

Services
Preceding station	Amtrak	Following station
Suisun–Fairfield toward San Jose	Capitol Corridor	Davis toward Auburn
California Zephyr does not stop here
Coast Starlight does not stop here
Location

Fairfield–Vacaville station is a train station in Fairfield, California, which provides rail access for the communities of Fairfield and Vacaville. The station is served by Amtrak California's Capitol Corridor rail line and FAST buses.

== History ==
An environmental impact study was finalized in 2011. Ground was broken for construction on May 20, 2015. and was given an estimated completion date of March 2017. The entire projected was budgeted at $40 million, including parking, bus facilities, and the construction of an expanded overpass to carry Peabody Road over the railroad tracks.

Previously scheduled to be completed by August 2017 and incorporated into the Capitol Corridor schedule in October of that year, final testing delayed opening until a later date. The station began service on November 13, 2017.

In May 2019, the stop was ceremonially named Fairfield–Vacaville Hannigan Station after the late Fairfield Assemblymember Thomas M. Hannigan, who contributed to the development of the Capitol Corridor service.
