= Skip (transportation company) =

American scooter-sharing service

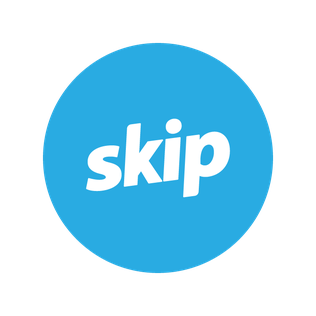

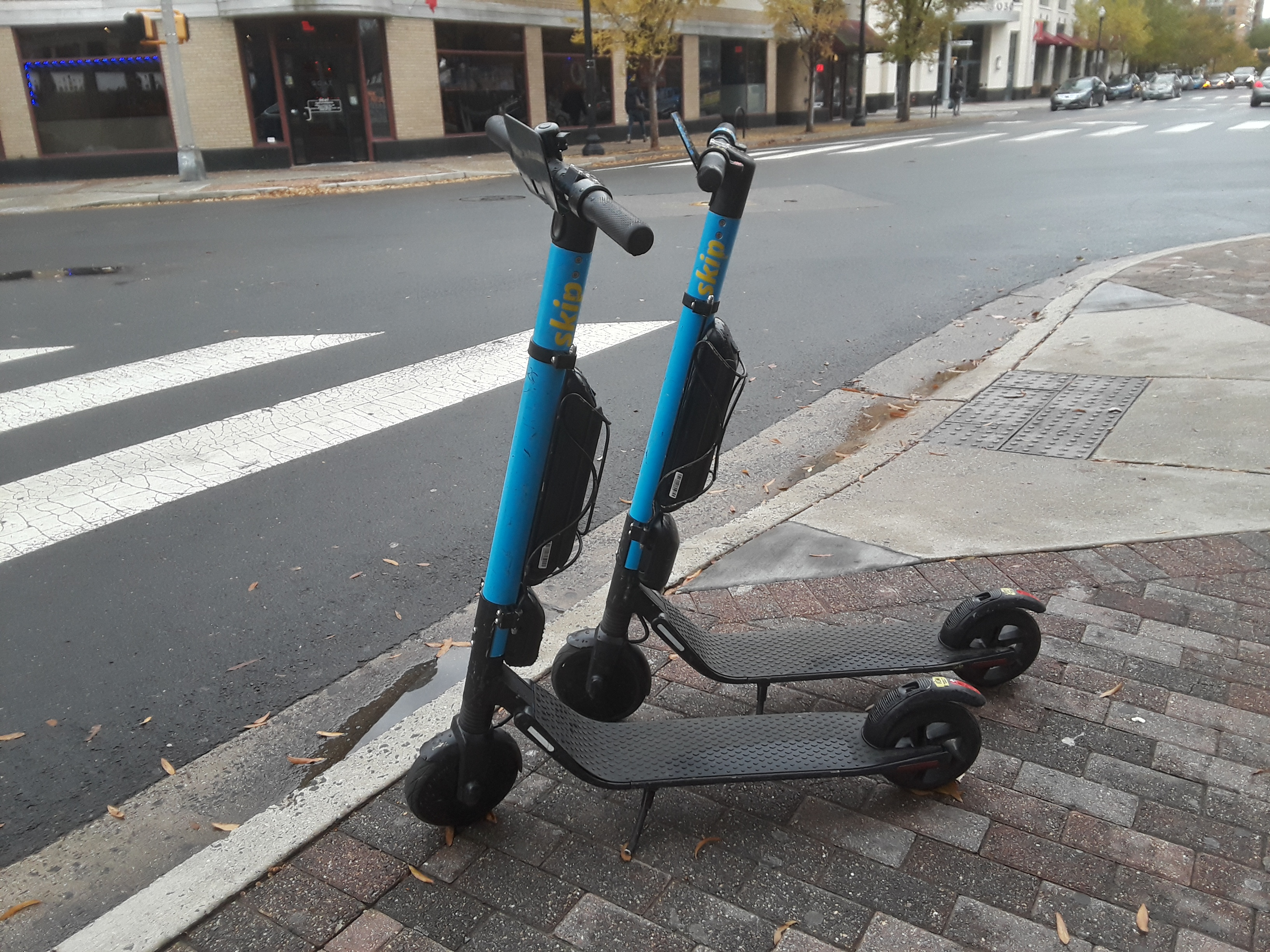
- A pair of Skip scooters in Clarendon, Arlington, Virginia
- Formerly: Waybots, Inc.
- Type: Private
- Industry: Scooter sharing
- Founded: December 2017; 8 years ago
- Founders: Matt Tran, Mike Wadhera, Sanjay Dastoor
- Defunct: August 2021; 4 years ago
- Fate: Bankrupted
- Headquarters: San Francisco, California, U.S.
- Areas served: Washington, D.C., Austin, TX, San Diego, CA, San Francisco, CA, Arlington, VA, Alexandria, VA
- Website: rideskip.com

Skip (est. in 2017) was a San Francisco-based company which provided a scooter-sharing system in several American cities. The company was founded by Matt Tran, Mike Wadhera, and Sanjay Dastoor during Y Combinator's winter 2018 class. Skip differentiated itself from competitors by making sturdier scooters with larger batteries, offering instructional classes, and working with cities before rolling out. It was acquired by Helbiz in 2020 and filed for Chapter 7 bankruptcy in August 2021.

== History ==
Skip was founded as Waybots in winter 2017 by the creators of Boosted Board, as higher-end competitor to other scooter-sharing systems.

In May 2018, Skip raised a $6M seed round of funding. In June 2018, the company raised an additional $25M in its Series A round.

In December 2020, Skip was acquired by competitor Helbiz.

The company filed for Chapter 7 bankruptcy (dissolution) in August 2021.

== Areas served ==
In February 2018, then Waybots launched in its first city, Washington, D.C., as part of a pilot program.

At the end of August 2018, the city of San Francisco gave Skip and Scoot permission to operate dockless scooters in the city. In an email sent out 15 October 2019 to its members, Skip announced that their scooters "will no longer be rentable as part of SFMTA’s Powered Scooter Share Program for 2019-2020" effective immediately, because the scooter batteries had a tendency to catch on fire. Skip has reportedly requested an appeal of SFMTA's decision, in order to continue operations in San Francisco.

Between June and July 2019, Skip launched in San Diego, CA and Austin, TX.
