= Davis station (California) =

Train station in Davis, California, US

Davis, CA
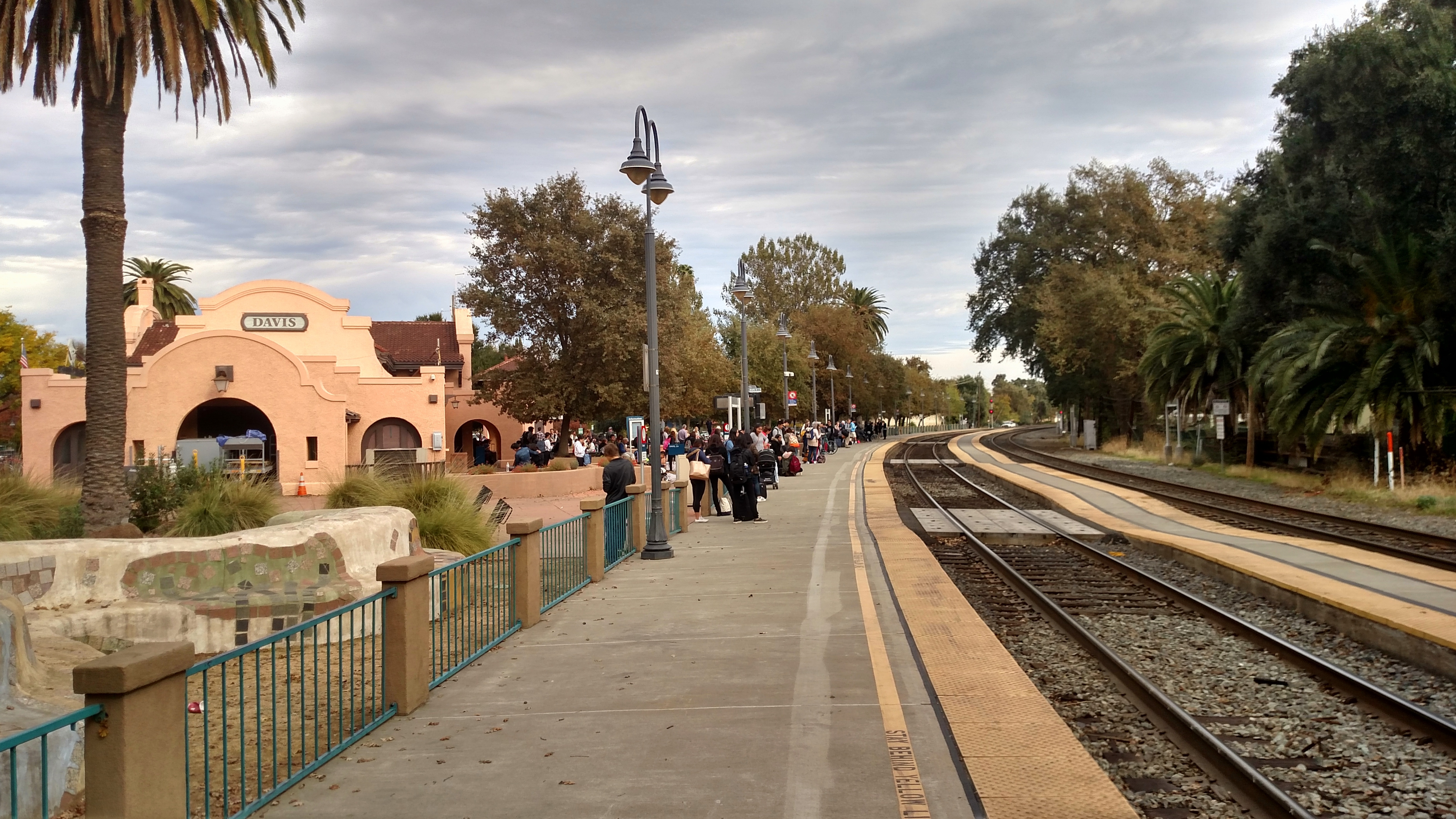
- Passengers wait at Davis station in November 2017

General information
- Location: 840 Second Street; Davis, California; United States
- Coordinates: 38°32′37″N 121°44′12″W
- Owner: City of Davis
- Lines: UP Martinez Subdivision; CFNR West Valley Line
- Platforms: 1 side platform, 1 island platform
- Tracks: 2
- Connections: Amtrak Thruway: 3; Unitrans

Construction
- Parking: Yes
- Cycle facilities: Yes
- Accessible: Yes

Other information
- Station code: Amtrak: DAV

History
- Opened: 1868
- Rebuilt: 1914, 1986
- Former names: Davisville

Passengers
- FY 2025: 275,354 (Amtrak)

Services
Preceding station	Amtrak	Following station
Martinez toward Emeryville	California Zephyr	Sacramento toward Chicago
Fairfield–Vacaville toward San Jose	Capitol Corridor	Sacramento toward Auburn
Martinez toward Los Angeles	Coast Starlight	Sacramento toward Seattle
Former services
Preceding station	Amtrak	Following station
Martinez toward Los Angeles	Coast Starlight	Gerber (Until 1972) toward Seattle
Martinez toward Los Angeles	Coast Starlight	Redding (1972–1974) toward Seattle
Martinez toward Los Angeles	Coast Starlight	Orland (1974–1982) toward Seattle
Martinez toward Los Angeles	Spirit of California (1981–1983)	Sacramento Terminus
Preceding station	Southern Pacific Railroad	Following station
Dixon toward Oakland Pier	Shasta Route Via West Side Sacramento Valley	Woodland toward Portland
Dixon toward Oakland Pier	Shasta Route Via East Side Sacramento Valley	Sacramento toward Portland
Dixon toward Oakland Pier	Overland Route	Sacramento toward Ogden
- Southern Pacific Railroad Station
- U.S. National Register of Historic Places
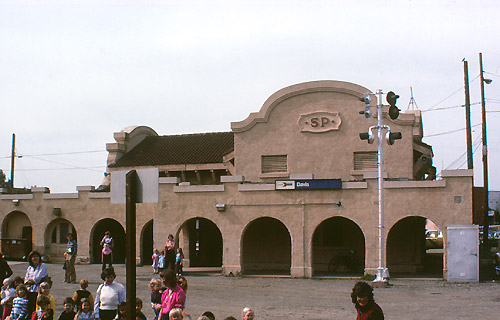
- Davis station in February 1984
- Area: 0.2 acres (0.08 ha)
- Built: 1914
- Built by: Southern Pacific Railroad
- Architectural style: Mission/Spanish Revival
- NRHP reference No.: 76000541
- Added to NRHP: November 7, 1976
Location

Davis station is a train station in Davis, California. The station is owned by the city, while the tracks are owned by the Union Pacific Railroad. The station is served by Amtrak California Zephyr, Capitol Corridor, and Coast Starlight trains. It is the primary stop for UC Davis and one of the busiest train stations in the region, serving over 10% of the total Capitol Corridor ridership.

== History ==
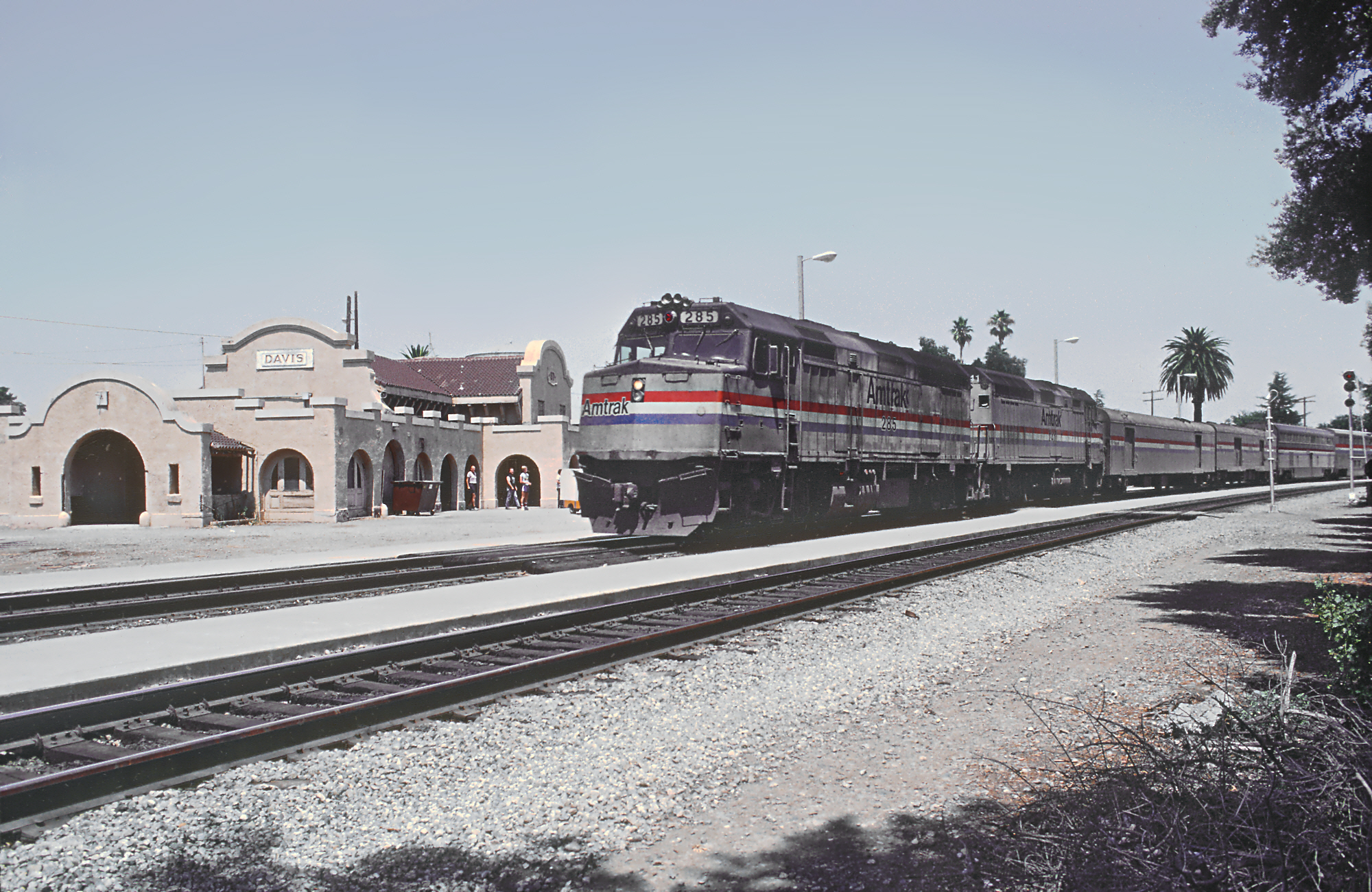
Amtrak Coast Starlight at Davis in August 1985

The line was built by the California Pacific Railroad between August 24 and November 15, 1868, connecting Davis to Washington (now part of West Sacramento) to the east, Vallejo to the southwest, and Marysville to the northeast via a wye at Davis to Woodland, where the line separated to go northwest to Redding via Tehama and northeast to Marysville via a drawbridge at Knights Landing. In 1871 the Cal-P (as it later was called) was taken over by the Central Pacific Railroad; a fire later burned down the 19th century-style station. In 1914 the Central Pacific built a second depot in the Mission Revival style, which was remodeled in 1986. The depot was listed in the National Register of Historic Places in 1976.

As of 2024, Amtrak plans to reconstruct the platform for accessibility by FY 2026.

A fire damaged the exterior of the station and the interior of one room in March of 2025.
