= Kaiser Vacaville Medical Center =

Coordinates: 38°23′18″N 121°56′20″W

Geography
- Location: 1 Quality Drive, Vacaville, California, United States

Links
- Lists: Hospitals in California

Kaiser Vacaville Medical Center is a Kaiser Permanente hospital in Vacaville, California, serving Solano County.

== History ==
In 2012 the hospital expanded its neurosurgery department, a service previously offered only in the core of the San Francisco Bay Area and Sacramento. A new helipad was also installed in 2012, serving the emergency department. In 2013, a birthing center was added. Also in 2013, the medical center earned a level II trauma center designation.

In 2014, the hospital launched a farmer's market. In 2015 the center won the, "Get With The Guidelines-Stroke Gold Plus Quality Achievement Award" In 2017 it was named a "top 25" hospital in environmental excellence.
