= Healdsburg Transit =

City bus service in Healdsburg

- Parent: City of Healdsburg
- Service area: city limits
- Service type: bus service, dial-a-bus
- Alliance: Sonoma County Transit
- Website: City of Healdsburg: Public busses

Healdsburg Transit (or short as HT) is a bus agency providing local service to Healdsburg, California.

HT provides fixed-route and dial-a-ride service. Transfers are possible to Sonoma County Transit. HT participates in the free rides spare-the-air program from the MTC.

Healdsburg offers free transportation via Route 67, nicknamed the Healdsburg Shuttle. Free transportation to places out of town via Route 60 is also offered via a transfer ticket.
