= Rio Vista Delta Breeze =

Bus transit service in California, US

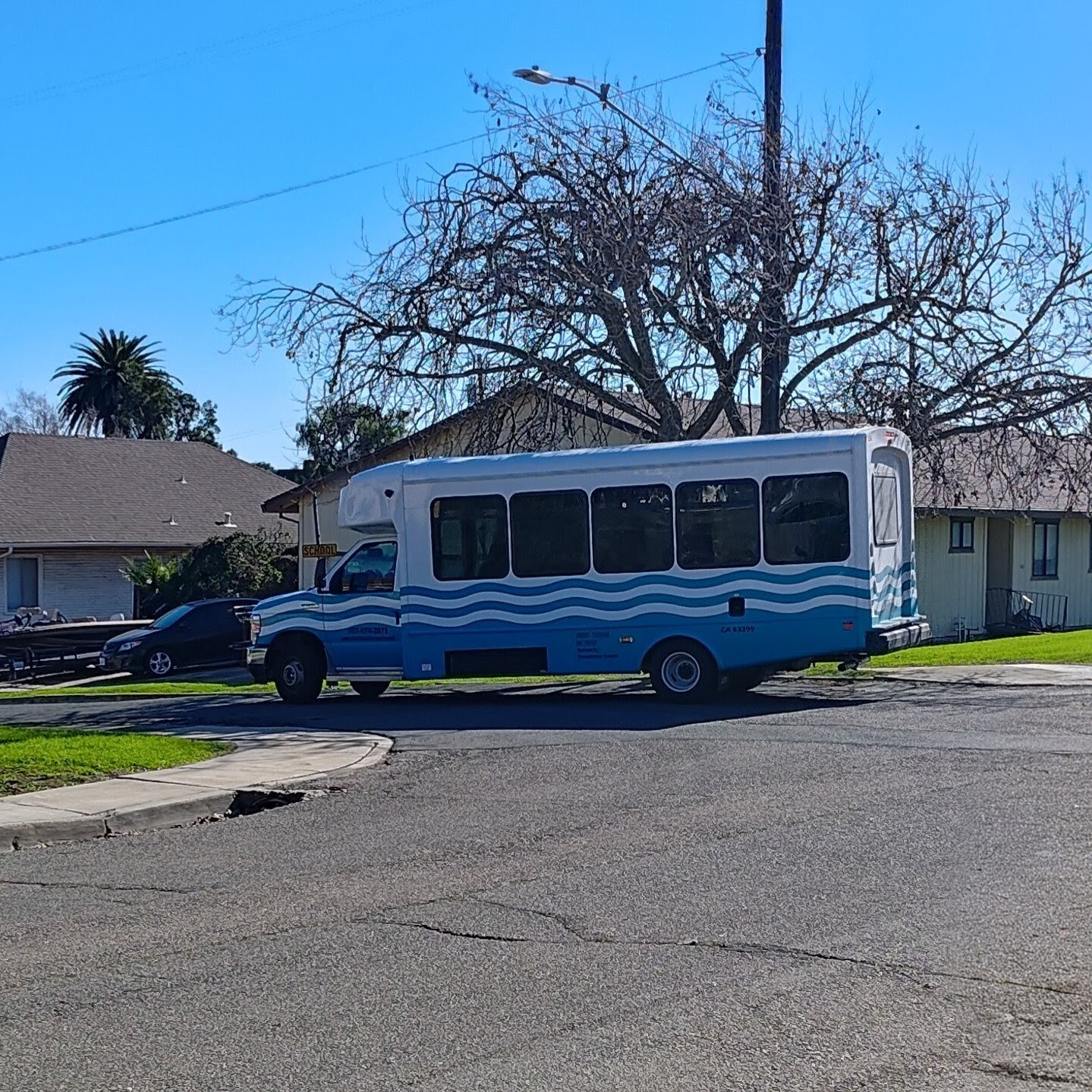
- Parent: City of Rio Vista
- Locale: Rio Vista, CA
- Routes: 3
- Hubs: Fairfield Transit Center, Pittsburg Bay Point BART Station
- Operator: Transportation Concepts

Rio Vista Delta Breeze is a bus transit service in Rio Vista, California.

== Service and operations ==
It offers flex fixed-route local service in the cities of Rio Vista and Isleton in addition to commuter service to the Fairfield Transportation Center and Antioch station. There was limited twice weekly service to the Pittsburg/Bay Point BART Station in Bay Point until 2010 when it became a regularly scheduled weekday service.

In Fairfield, Rio Vista Delta Breeze connects with Amtrak and Greyhound. Rio Vista Delta Breeze has an interline agreements with Greyhound.
