= VINE Transit =

American public transportation service

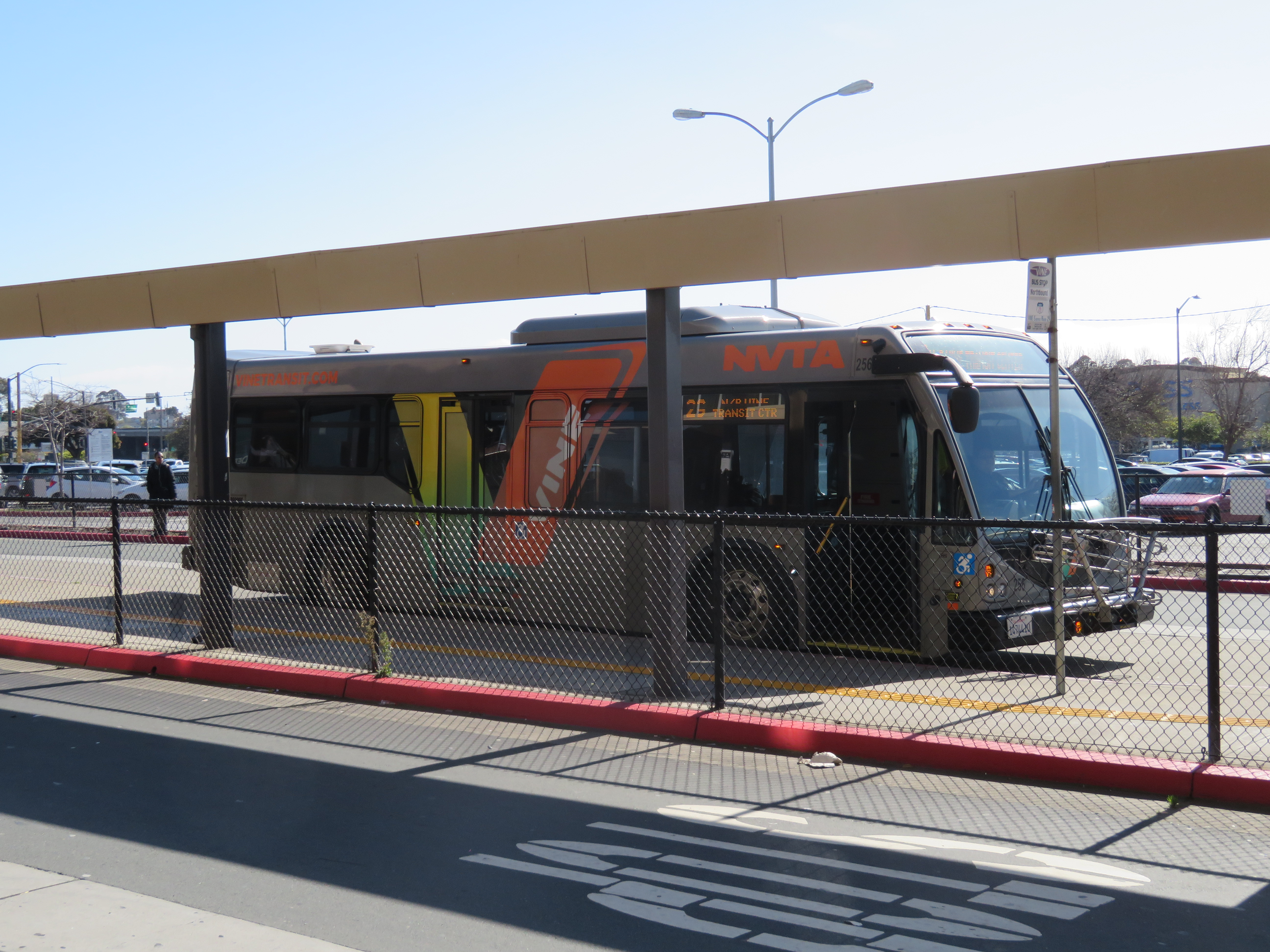
- Parent: Napa Valley Transportation Authority
- Founded: 1998
- Headquarters: 625 Burnell Street, Napa, California
- Service area: Napa County, California
- Service type: bus service, paratransit
- Routes: 12
- Stops: 329 [2024]
- Destinations: Calistoga, Saint Helena, Yountville, Napa, American Canyon, Vallejo, Fairfield, Suisun, El Cerrito Del Norte BART,
- Hubs: 4
- Stations: 1
- Daily ridership: 1,900 (weekdays, Q2 2026)
- Annual ridership: 524,700 (2025)
- Fuel type: Diesel, CNG, Electric
- Operator: Transdev
- Website: vinetransit.com

VINE Transit (an acronym for Valley Intercity Neighborhood Express) is a public transportation service in Napa County, California, United States; it is managed under the Napa Valley Transportation Authority and operated by Transdev. The system offers extensive service throughout the county along with providing connections to other public transportation systems in adjacent counties. In 2025, the system had a ridership of 524,700, or about 1,900 per weekday as of the second quarter of 2026.

== Service coverage ==
The Napa VINE provides services to the following cities, towns, and communities:

- Napa County
  - American Canyon
  - Napa
  - Yountville
  - St. Helena
  - Calistoga
- Solano County
  - Vallejo
  - Fairfield
  - Suisun
- Contra Costa County
  - El Cerrito

== Schedules ==
All Napa VINE services do not operate on the following holidays:

- New Year's Day
- Memorial Day
- Independence Day (July 4)
- Labor Day
- Thanksgiving
- Christmas
- Christmas Eve and New Year's Eve, if it falls on a Sunday

However, these services operate on Saturday schedules on other holidays, including:

- President's Day
- Day after Thanksgiving
- Christmas Eve
- New Year's Eve

On other holidays, (i.e. Columbus Day, Veterans Day), trips operate on normal weekday schedules.

== Routes ==
VINE Transit in Napa County currently operates a hybrid fixed-route and on-demand system in the City of Napa and two regional routes and three express routes which provides connections between other bus systems, ferry, BART, and Amtrak. The Amtrak Thruway7 bus provides daily connections between Arcata and Martinez, and points in between. Express routes are subject to additional fares.

Route	Route Name/Area Served	Days of Operation
A	browns valley	Weekdays and Saturday
B	Westwood | South Napa	Weekdays and Saturday
C	Jefferson | South Napa	Weekdays and Saturday
D	Shurtleff	Weekdays and Saturday
E	Vintage	Weekdays and Saturday
F	Southwest Napa	Weekdays and Saturday
G	Coombs	Weekdays and Saturday
10	Up Valley Connector	Daily
11	Napa-Vallejo Connector	Daily
11X	Napa-Vallejo Express	Weekdays
21	Napa-Solano Express	Weekdays
29	Napa-BART Express | mon-sat	Weekdays

== Shuttle brands ==
VINE manages and operates a number of deviated fixed-route or dial-a-ride bus services in other cities and towns in the county using different brand names.

- American Canyon Transit (ACT) is an on-demand service that serves most of American Canyon and parts of North Vallejo. The service also operates a limited fixed-route service on weekdays. It connects with VINE Routes 11, 11X and 29, and SolTrans Route 1A and Route 1B.
- Calistoga Shuttle is an on-demand dial-a-ride service that operates within Calistoga. It connects to VINE Route 10
- St. Helena Shuttle is an on-demand dial-a-ride service that operates a route within the city of St. Helena. It connects to VINE Route 10.
- Yountville Bee Line is an on-demand dial-a-ride service that operates in the city of Yountville.

=== Former brands ===
- Yountville Trolley was a deviated fixed route service that operated a north–south route in the city of Yountville, California|Yountville. It connects to VINE Route 10.

== Fares, transfers, and passes ==
To board a VINE bus, a passenger must either present a pass, Clipper Card, transfer slip or pay a cash fare. VINE offers discount passes in 31-day 1-day and 20-ride formats. A 31-day ($55.00) pass offers unlimited rides for 31 consecutive days from the first day of use on regular routes (A-G 10-11X); there are two separate types of 31-day passes for Route 29 ($125.00). For 20-ride passes, one use is used to board a regular bus, while uses on the 29 and 21 you may have 3 for the 29 and 2 for the 21. Transfer slips are issued to passengers who pay their fare. They are used to transfer from one regular/regional route to another without the need to pay an additional fare or however a transfer are not valid between Routes 10 and 11 or to the route 29. Since 2014, Clipper Cards are accepted and various 31-day passes can be loaded onto the card. If nothing is presented, a cash fare must be paid.
