= Fairfield and Suisun Transit =

Californian public bus service operator

Coordinates: 38°14′54″N 122°4′7″W

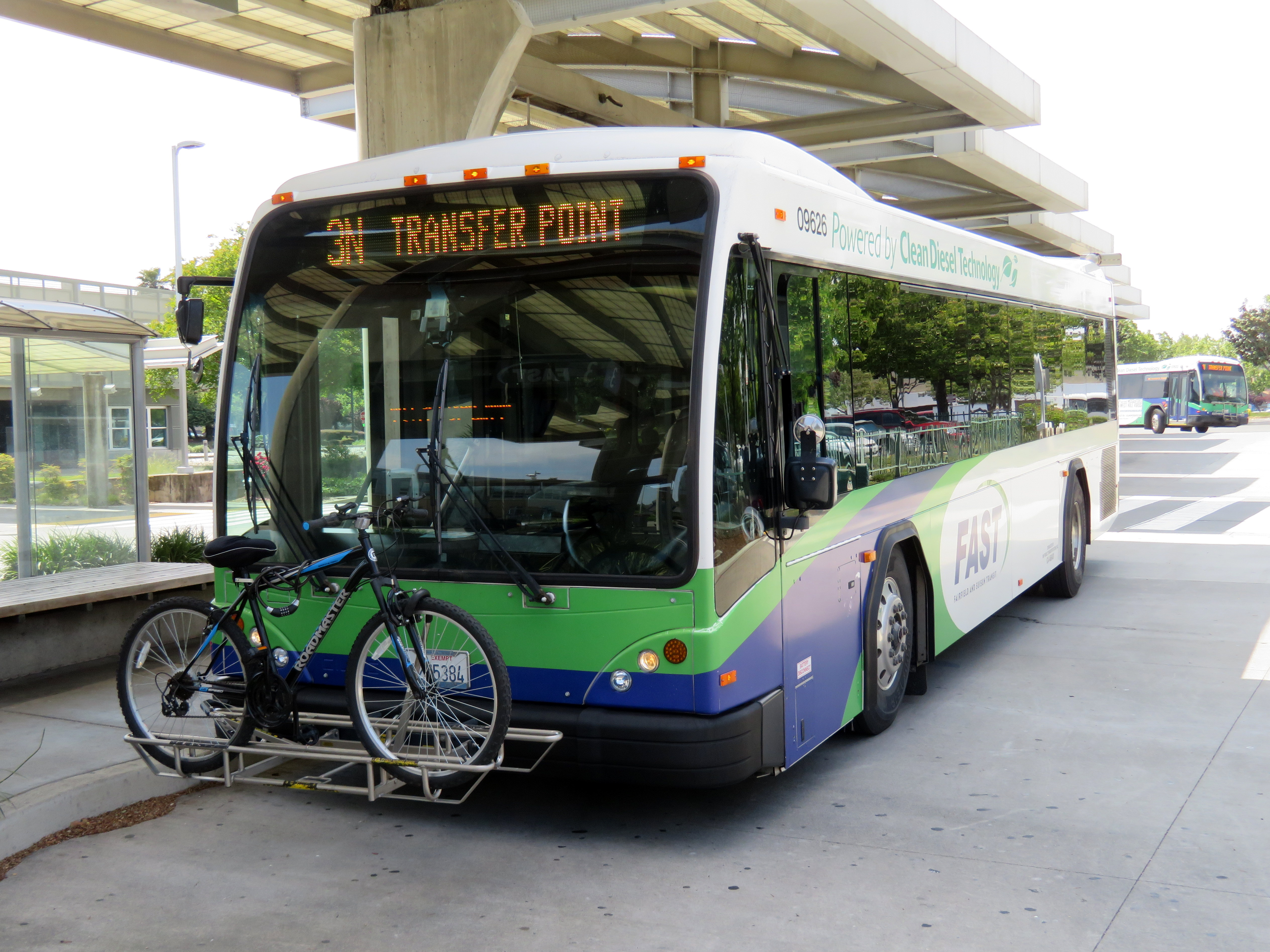
- Parent: City of Fairfield
- Headquarters: 2000 Cadenasso Drive; Fairfield, California
- Locale: Fairfield
- Service area: Central and Northern Solano County
- Service type: Bus service Paratransit
- Routes: 8
- Daily ridership: 1,000 (weekdays, Q4 2024)
- Annual ridership: 206,900 (2024)
- Website: fasttransit.org

Fairfield Transit (FAST) provides general public fixed route bus service through eight local routes. All FAST buses are wheelchair accessible and most are equipped with bike racks. In 2024, the system had a ridership of 206,900, or about 1,000 per weekday as of the fourth quarter of 2024.

== Routes ==
=== Fixed routes ===
FAST runs eight bus lines within the city of Fairfield (including Cordelia) with transfer hubs at the Fairfield Transportation Center (FTC), the Fairfield–Vacaville Amtrak station, a Walmart store, and Solano Town Center.
