= 16th Street station (Oakland) =

Former train station in the Prescott neighborhood of Oakland, California

Oakland
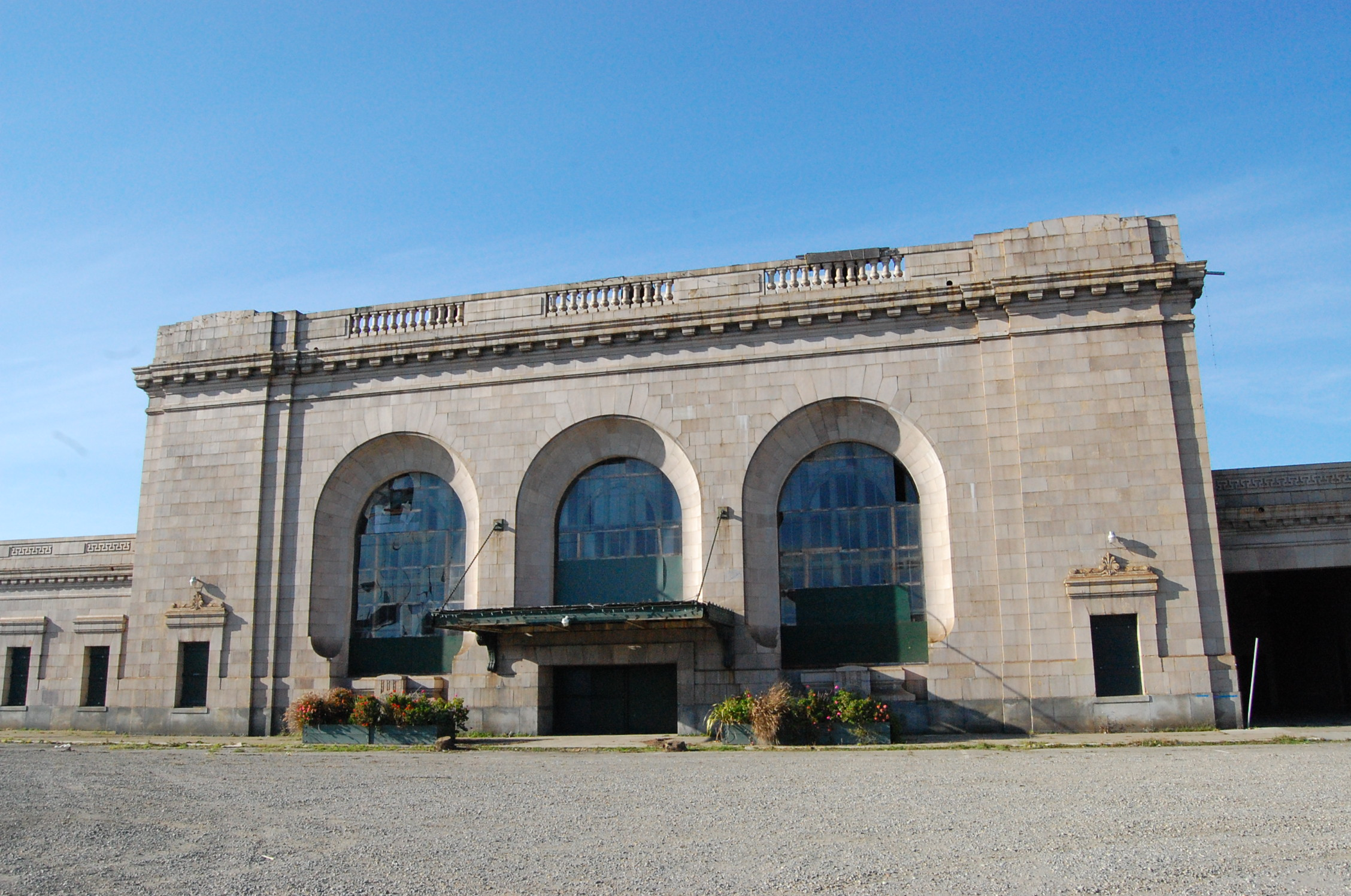
- Oakland 16th Street Station, main entrance, December 2007

General information
- Location: 1601 Wood Street, Oakland, California; United States
- Coordinates: 37°48′56.1″N 122°17′48.3″W
- Owner: BUILD
- Line: Martinez Subdivision

Other information
- Station code: OAK

History
- Opened: 1878
- Closed: August 21, 1994
- Rebuilt: August 3, 1912
Former services
Preceding station	Amtrak	Following station
Terminus	California Zephyr	Emeryville toward Chicago
Fremont toward San Jose	Capitols (1991–1993)	Emeryville toward Roseville
San Jose toward Los Angeles	Coast Starlight	Emeryville toward Seattle
Terminus	San Joaquins (1974–1993)	Emeryville toward Bakersfield
San Jose toward Los Angeles	Spirit of California (1981–1983)	Richmond toward Sacramento
Terminus	San Francisco Zephyr	Richmond toward Chicago
Preceding station	Southern Pacific Railroad	Following station
Oakland Pier Terminus	Shasta Route	Berkeley toward Portland
Oakland Pier Terminus	Overland Route	Berkeley toward Ogden
Oakland Pier Terminus	San Joaquin Daylight	Berkeley toward Los Angeles
Oakland Pier Terminus	City of San Francisco	Berkeley toward Chicago
Oakland Pier Terminus	18th Street Line Until 1933	Wood toward 2nd & Webster
Oakland Pier Terminus	Berkeley Branch Until 1939	34th Street toward Thousand Oaks
Oakland Pier Terminus	California Street Line Until 1933	34th Street toward Thousand Oaks
Oakland Pier Terminus	Ninth Street Line Until 1939	34th Street toward Thousand Oaks
Transbay Terminal Terminus	7th Street Line 1939–1941	Pine Street toward San Leandro–Dutton Avenue
Transbay Terminal Terminus	Lincoln Avenue Line 1939–1941	Pearl Street toward West Alameda
Transbay Terminal Terminus	Encinal Avenue Line 1939–1941	Pearl Street toward West Alameda
- Southern Pacific 16th Street Station and 16th Street Tower
- U.S. National Register of Historic Places
- Architect: Jarvis Hunt
- NRHP reference No.: 100011288
- Added to NRHP: January 21, 2025

Oakland Designated Landmark
- Designated: 1984
- Reference no.: 81
Location

16th Street station (Oakland Central) is a former Southern Pacific Railroad station in the Prescott neighborhood of Oakland, California, United States. The Beaux-Arts building was designed by architect Jarvis Hunt, a preeminent railroad station architect, and opened in 1912. The station has not been served by trains since 1994. It was added to the National Register of Historic Places in 2025 under the name Southern Pacific 16th Street Station and 16th Street Tower.

== History ==
=== Southern Pacific ===
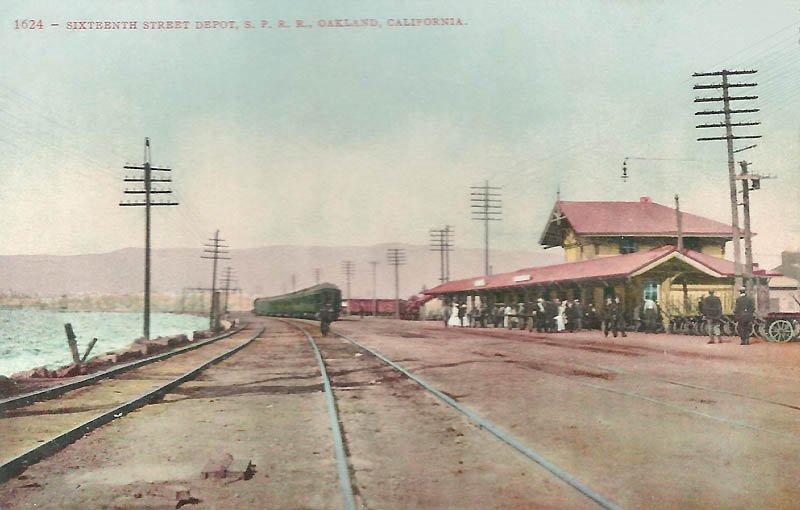
The original station in 1910

The original 16th Street depot was a smaller wood structure, built in 1878 when the tracks were on the shoreline of San Francisco Bay. Later the shoreline was filled and now lies nearly a mile west. Local horsecar service to the station began in January 1880 when the Fourteenth Street Railroad was extended down 16th Street.

The original depot was replaced by a Beaux-Arts building designed by architect Jarvis Hunt which opened for service on August 3, 1912.

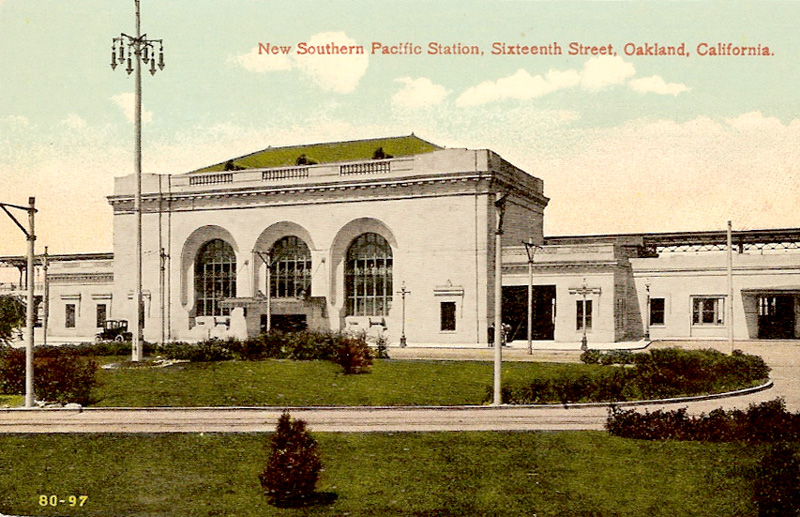
1910s postcard of the station

For decades the 16th Street station was the main Oakland station for Southern Pacific (SP) through trains, almost entirely replacing the 7th Street station. It was a companion (or "city station") for Oakland Pier, two miles away, where passengers could board ferries to San Francisco. (After 1958, the ferries were replaced by buses from 16th Street station to the SP's Third and Townsend Depot.) The elevated platforms were used for the SP-owned East Bay Electric Lines commuter service (renamed Interurban Electric Railway or IER in 1938).

IER trains from Berkeley no longer stopped at 16th Street when railroad service over the Bay Bridge opened on January 15, 1939, as the junction from those lines to the bridge was north of the station. When the IER folded in July 1941, portions of some lines were sold to the competing Key System for use by their transbay trains; however, the Key System only served the station with a surface streetcar line on 16th Street, and did not use the elevated platforms.

Major long-distance trains from the station included the Oakland Lark (night train to Los Angeles) and the City of San Francisco (to Chicago).

=== Amtrak and replacement ===
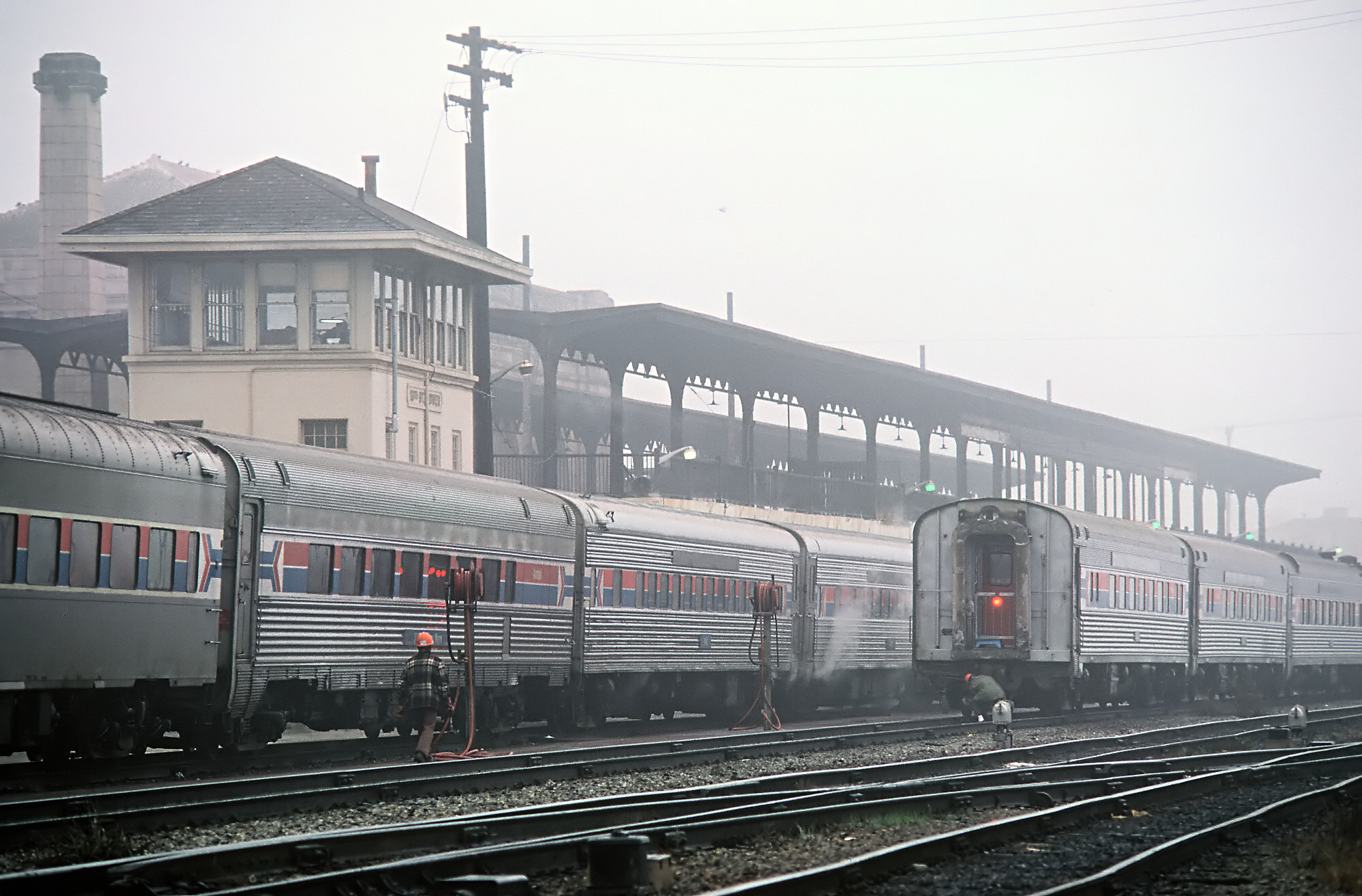
Amtrak trains at 16th Street station in 1980

The station also served as the main rail link for points north and east of the Bay Area. San Francisco-area passengers boarded ferries to Oakland Pier, and after 1958 boarded buses to 16th Street. Amtrak took over intercity passenger rail services in 1971, and decided to consolidate most Bay Area service in Oakland, leaving San Francisco as one of the largest cities without direct intercity rail service.

The station was severely damaged in the 1989 Loma Prieta earthquake, but continued serving trains at an adjacent building. Capitols and San Joaquins trains were shifted to the new Emeryville station on August 13, 1993, but long-distance trains continued to use Oakland Central while track work was completed at Emeryville. The Coast Starlight and California Zephyr began stopping at Emeryville on August 5, 1994; they last stopped at Oakland 16th Street on August 21. This left Emeryville as the only Oakland-area stop for Amtrak until the new Oakland–Jack London Square station opened on May 22, 1995.

Emeryville largely replaced 16th Street station as the connection point for Amtrak Thruway across the bay in San Francisco (for passengers heading northbound towards Seattle or eastbound towards Chicago, or passengers arriving from the north and east), as Emeryville is closer to the San Francisco–Oakland Bay Bridge than Oakland–Jack London Square. However, Jack London Square serves as the San Francisco connection for the Coast Starlight (for southbound passengers from San Francisco and northbound passengers heading to San Francisco).

In the mid-1990s, the adjacent railroad tracks were moved west during the construction of Interstate 880 (to replace the earthquake-destroyed Cypress Street Viaduct), which isolated the station from the tracks. The station buildings are largely intact, including the interlocking tower and ironwork elevated platforms. The station was purchased in 2005 by BUILD, an affiliate of BRIDGE Housing, and is being restored as part of a local redevelopment project. In 2015, the station was used to stage a local opera company's production of Lulu. As of 2021, the station is being used as a rented space for private events.

The station and interlocking tower were added to the National Register of Historic Places on January 21, 2025, under the name Southern Pacific 16th Street Station and 16th Street Tower.

== In media ==
The station was used in films including Chu Chu and the Philly Flash, Funny Lady (as Cleveland station), Rent, and Hemingway & Gellhorn (as a stand-in for the Hotel Florida). Multiple music videos have been filmed at the station, including "Babel" by Mumford & Sons and "Tell Me When to Go" by E-40.
