= Richmond station (California) =

Railway station in Richmond, California, US

Richmond
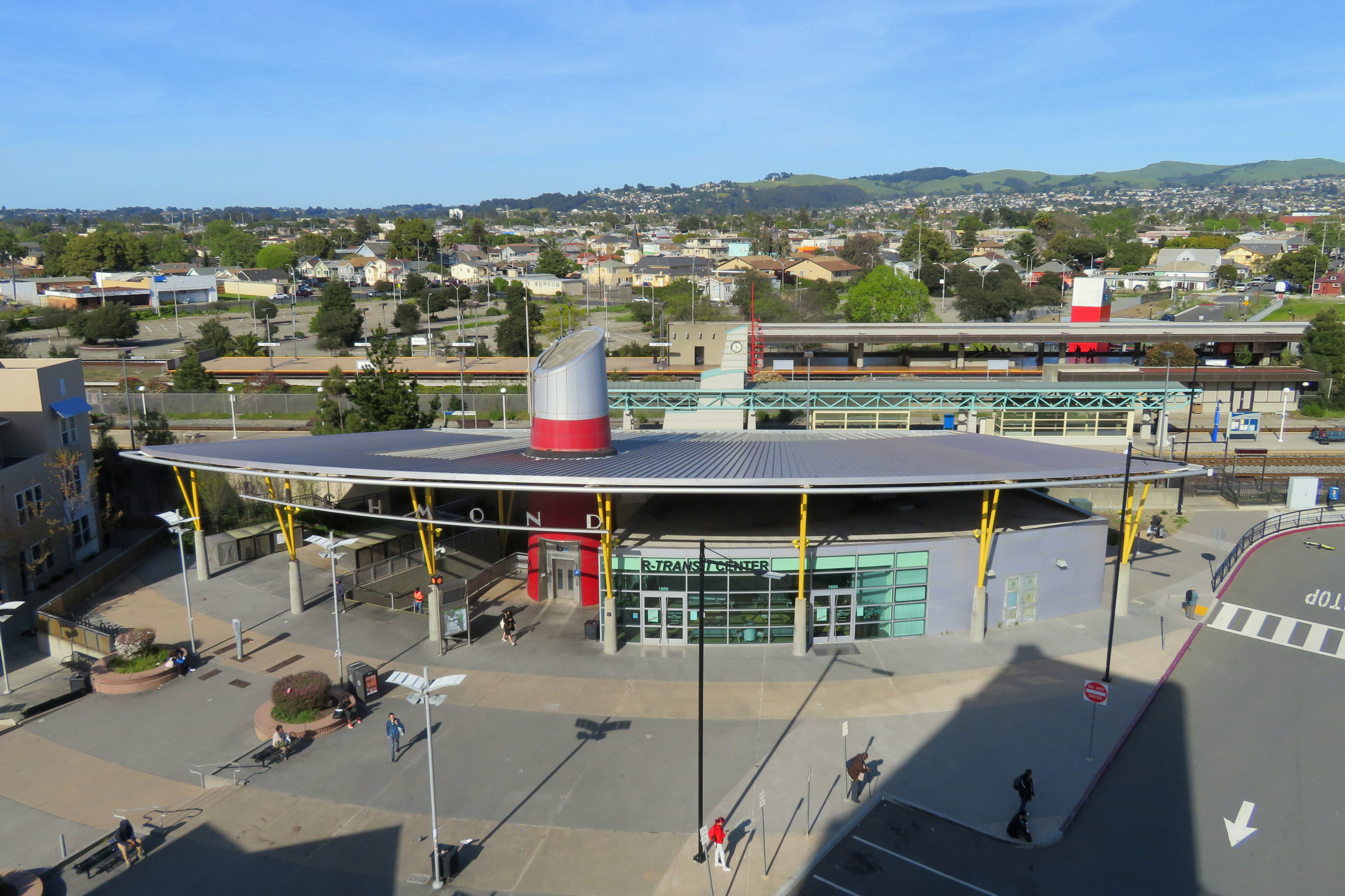
- The main entrance to Richmond station in April 2018

General information
- Location: 1700 Nevin Avenue; Richmond, California; United States
- Coordinates: 37.9368°N 122.3531°W
- Owner: Bay Area Rapid Transit; Union Pacific Railroad (Amtrak platform)
- Lines: UP Martinez Subdivision; BART R-Line
- Platforms: 1 island platform (Amtrak); 1 island platform (BART)
- Tracks: 3 (Amtrak); 2 (BART)
- Connections: AC Transit: 70, 71, 72M, 74, 76 800; Flixbus

Construction
- Parking: 768 spaces
- Cycle facilities: Racks and 32 lockers
- Accessible: Yes
- Architect: Maher & Martens

Other information
- Station code: BART: RICH; Amtrak: RIC

History
- Opened: January 29, 1973 (BART); October 30, 1977 (Amtrak)
- Rebuilt: October 18, 2007

Passengers
- 2026: 2,923 (weekday average) (BART)
- FY 2025: 202,257 (Amtrak)

Services
Preceding station	Amtrak	Following station
Emeryville Terminus	California Zephyr	Martinez toward Chicago
Berkeley toward San Jose	Capitol Corridor	Martinez toward Auburn
Emeryville toward Oakland	Gold Runner	Martinez toward Bakersfield
Coast Starlight does not stop here
Preceding station	Bay Area Rapid Transit	Following station
El Cerrito del Norte toward Berryessa	Orange Line	Terminus
El Cerrito del Norte toward Millbrae	Red Line	Terminus
Former services
Preceding station	Amtrak	Following station
Emeryville toward Los Angeles	Coast Starlight 1978–1996, 2013–2020	Martinez toward Seattle
Oakland-16th Street toward Los Angeles	Spirit of California 1981–1983	Martinez toward Sacramento
Preceding station	Southern Pacific Railroad	Following station
Stege toward Oakland Pier	Overland Route	San Pablo toward Ogden
Stege toward Oakland Pier	Shasta Route	San Pablo toward Portland
Track layout
Key
Location

Richmond station (officially the Richmond Transit Center) is an Amtrak intercity rail and Bay Area Rapid Transit (BART) station located in downtown Richmond, California. Richmond is the north terminus of BART service on the Orange Line and Red Line; it is a stop for Amtrak's Capitol Corridor, Gold Runner, and California Zephyr routes. The accessible station has one island platform for the two BART tracks, with a second island platform serving two of the three tracks of the Union Pacific Railroad Martinez Subdivision for Amtrak trains. It is one of two transfer points between BART and Amtrak, along with Oakland Coliseum station.

The Southern Pacific (SP)-controlled Northern Railway opened through what is now Richmond in 1878. A flag stop at Barrett's Station was established by the mid-1880s; it was renamed Richmond in 1902 during the town's rapid growth. The SP constructed a new station at Richmond in 1904 and again in 1914–15. The SP station was demolished around 1968, though passenger continued until the formation of Amtrak in 1971.

The modern station opened on January 29, 1973, as the northern terminal of BART service. Controversies during planning included the station location and the design of the concourse. Amtrak service to the station began on October 30, 1977. A new Amtrak platform was built in 2001, followed by a renovation of the whole station completed in 2007. A parking garage replaced the surface parking lot in 2013.

== Station design and services ==
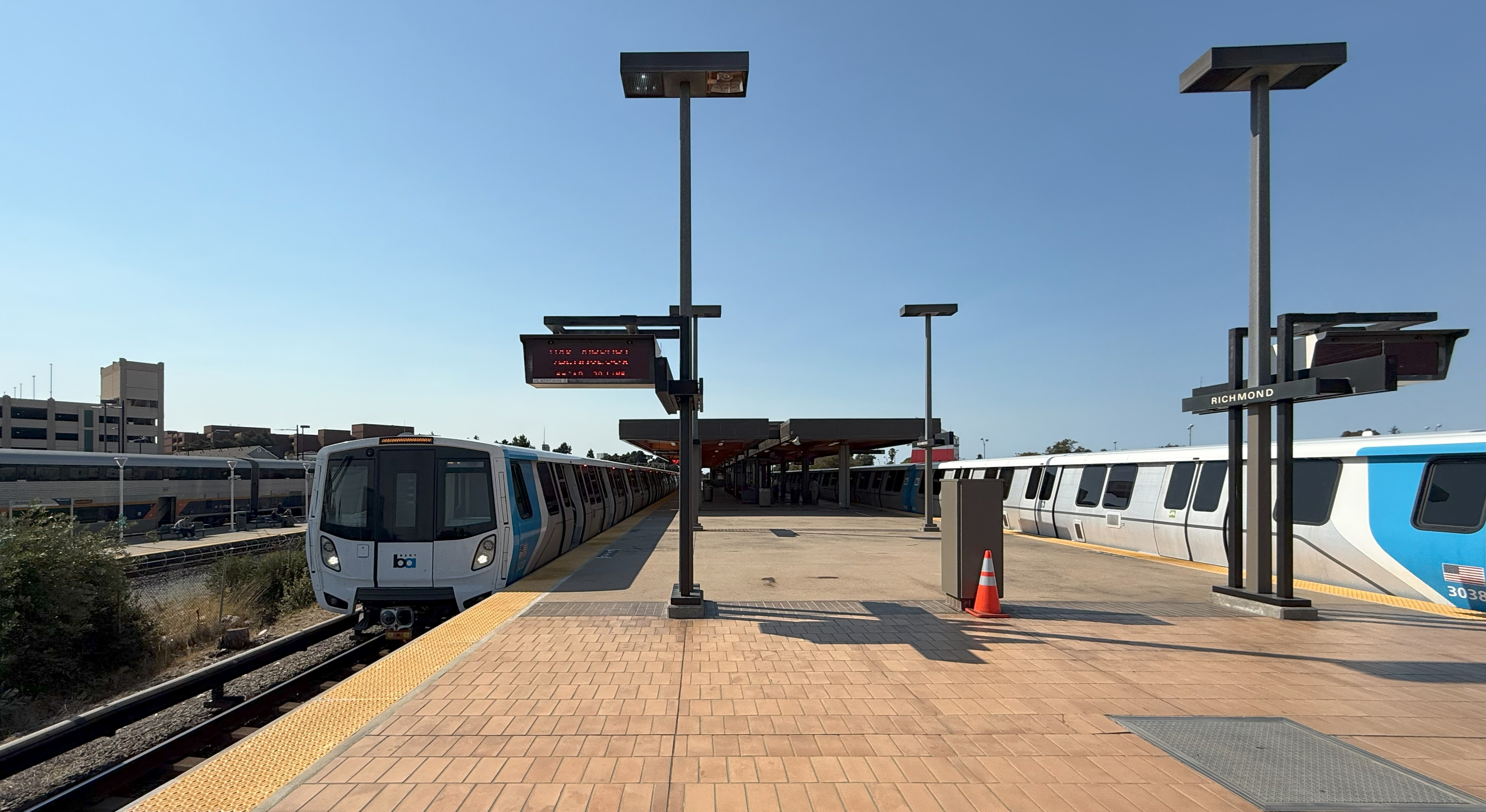
Southbound Capitol Corridor and BART trains at the station in 2025

Richmond station is located in Downtown Richmond in a large block bounded by Macdonald Avenue, Marina Way, Barrett Avenue, and 19th Street. The rail right-of-way runs diagonally (northwest–southeast) through the block at street level, with bridges over lowered sections of Macdonald Avenue and Barrett Avenue at the ends of the station. The BART platform – a single island platform with two tracks – is located on the east side of the station complex. Richmond is the north terminus of BART service on the Orange Line and Red Line. The Amtrak platform – an island platform served by two of the three tracks of the Union Pacific Railroad Martinez Subdivision – is located to its west. It is served by the Capitol Corridor, Gold Runner, and California Zephyr routes.

A pedestrian concourse aligned with Nevin Avenue runs east–west under the tracks and platforms. Entrances from street level are located at both ends of the concourse. A semicircular "industrial post-modern" metal canopy covers the west entrance and a small retail building. A parking garage, a curved busway, and a kiss and ride lane are located on the southwest side of the station. Metro Walk, a mixed-use transit-oriented development, occupies the northwest corner of the block. The station is fully accessible, with elevators to both platforms and at both entrances.

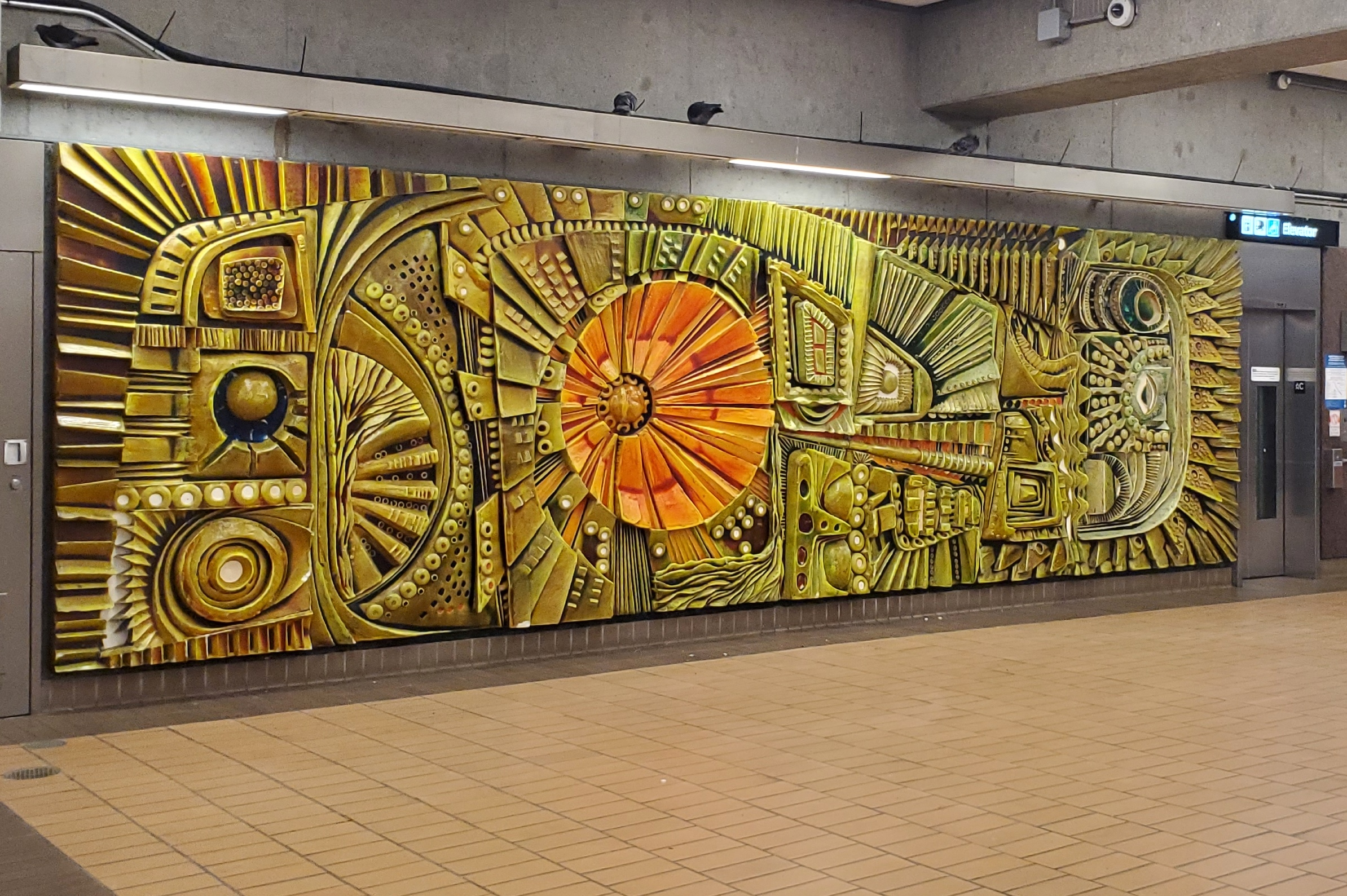
Mosaic relief by William Mitchell

The BART station was one of five designed by local firm Maher & Martens. Three pieces of public art are located around the station complex. A mosaic relief of marine life by William Mitchell, made of seashells and fiberglass, is in the BART paid area of the concourse. Architecture critic Dave Weinstein describes it as "rather disquieting" and "the strangest work at any BART station". On the Right Track, a 2007 series of tile murals by Jos Sances and Daniel Galvez, is located in the west entrance plaza. Moving Richmond by Mildred Howard consists of two bent weathering steel plates with poetry by Ishmael Reed on the side of the parking garage.

Although Richmond is a terminal station for BART, most connecting regional bus services instead run to El Cerrito del Norte station, which is much closer to I-80. Richmond station is served by several AC Transit bus services — local routes 70, 71, 72M, 74, 76, 376; several school routes; and all-night route 800 — all of which use the station busway. Flixbus intercity buses and local shuttles also use the busway. A Golden Gate Transit route over the Richmond–San Rafael Bridge connecting Richmond to the agency's main service area in North Bay ran until 2015, when it was combined with a route that terminates at El Cerrito del Norte station.

== History ==
=== Southern Pacific Railroad ===
The Southern Pacific (SP)-controlled Northern Railway opened through the then-uninhabited swamplands near Point Richmond on January 8, 1878. Stops were soon established at San Pablo, north of what is now Richmond, and Stege in what is now the southeast corner of Richmond. By the mid-1880s, the SP established a flag stop at Barrett's station at modern-day Barrett Avenue. It was named for George H. Barrett, a local landowner whose house was nearby. By the turn of the century, Barrett's station was a three-sided shelter at which passengers could hail several daily trains.

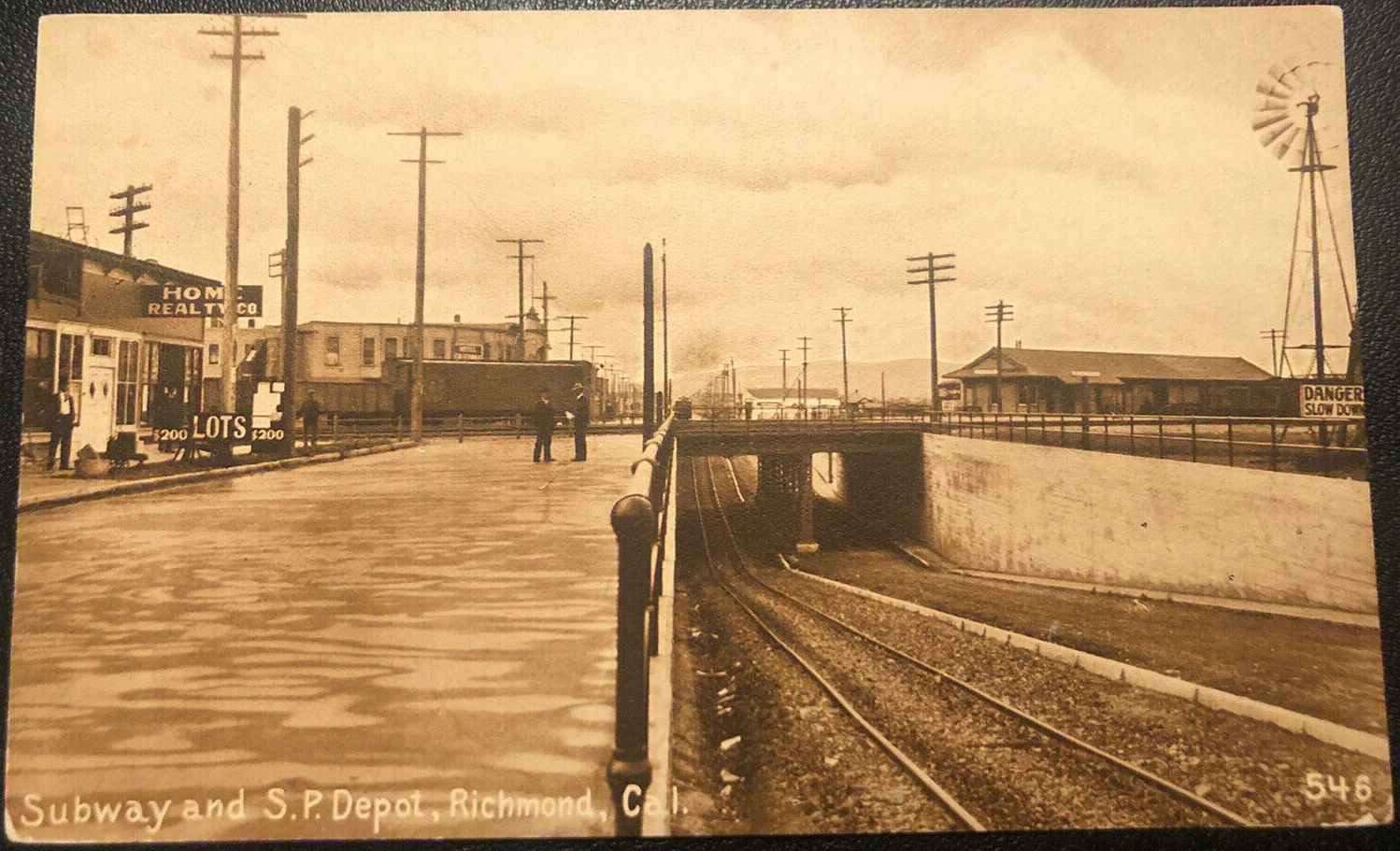
Postcard view of the Macdonald Avenue underpass, with the 1904-built SP station at right

In 1902, Barrett's station was renamed Richmond to match the rapidly growing town. The SP built a new Richmond station on the north side of Macdonald Avenue in 1904. The old "shed" was demolished on August 18, 1904, with the new station — a single-story structure with an attached freight house — opened soon after. The SP began work on a new station, estimated to cost $11,000 (equivalent to $250,000 in 2024), in August 1914. It opened in September 1915, with the old station relocated west for use as a freight house. The new station was a larger wooden structure with porticos at both ends.

The East Shore and Suburban Railway (later a Key System subsidiary) opened from the Standard Oil refinery to the SP station on July 7, 1904. An extension eastwards along Macdonald Avenue opened in October 1905, crossing the SP tracks at grade. A city ordinance disallowed streetcars from crossing the SP tracks with passengers aboard, forcing passengers to cross the tracks on foot. A $35,000 contract (equivalent to $860,000 in 2024) was issued on September 1, 1907, for construction of an underpass to take Macdonald Avenue and the streetcars under the SP tracks. The underpass opened on May 10, 1908. Streetcars were replaced with Key System buses — later part of AC Transit — in 1933.

Even as intercity rail service began to decline, Richmond was served by SP trains on the Shasta Route, Overland Route, and Central Valley routes, plus Santa Fe service to the Central Valley at its Richmond station. The SP station building was closed on August 30, 1968, and demolished shortly afterward for BART construction, leaving passengers with only a platform. SP service to Richmond on the San Joaquin Daylight continued until May 1, 1971, when Amtrak took over intercity passenger service.

=== BART station ===
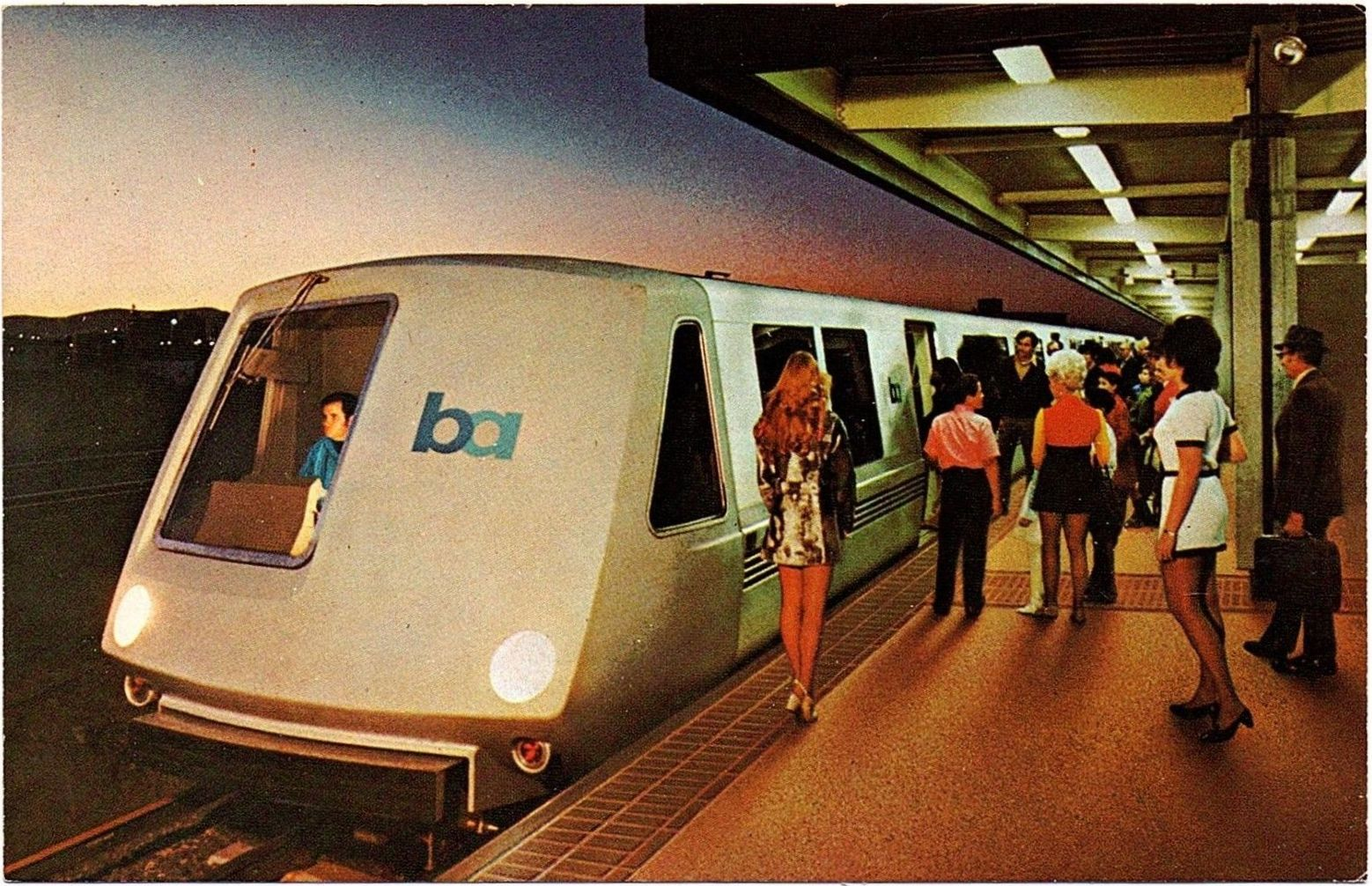
The BART station in the 1970s

As early as 1957, Richmond was identified as a likely terminus for a line of a proposed regional rapid transit system. The Bay Area Rapid Transit (BART) system was approved by voters in November 1962. The BART Board approved the name "Richmond" in December 1965. The station was originally to be located at 6th Street and Macdonald Avenue west of downtown, but this was changed to 16th Street and Nevin Avenue (along the SP line) to allow construction of a rail yard north of the station and permit future extension. After tension between the Bay Area Rapid Transit District and the city, an agreement to use the latter site was reached in May 1967. The chosen BART alignment followed an ATSF branch line from North Berkeley to 23rd Street in Richmond, then curved north onto the SP alignment for the final one-half mile (0.8 km) into Richmond station. The tracks continued past the station to the rail yard; the grade crossing of Barrett Avenue — which was ranked the fifth-highest priority for elimination on a 1965 state list — was replaced with a road underpass.

By August 1967, with about 57 miles (92 km) of the initial 75-mile (121 km) system under construction, a budget shortfall led to the possibility of portions being deferred. Among the potential cuts was Richmond station, as construction had not begun past the Alameda/Contra Costa county line at El Cerrito del Norte. Not until March 1969, when the state approved a temporary sales tax to cover the shortfall, could work begin on the contracts for the remaining stations including Richmond. In June 1968, the original design for an elevated concourse was replaced with an underground concourse in response to objections from city officials.

The station was built by Rothschild & Raffin, which also constructed the Richmond Yard and several other BART stations, at a cost of $2.3 million (equivalent to $13 million in 2024). The construction of Richmond station was credited by local officials as the key piece of downtown redevelopment efforts. BART service to Richmond began on January 29, 1973; it has remained a terminus since. (An extension to Crockett was considered in 1991 but not pursued.) BART service to Richmond was initially only on the Richmond–Fremont line (now the Orange Line). Some direct service to San Francisco (today's Red Line) began in April 1976; all-day service began on July 7, 1980, after BART was able to reduce train spacing through the Transbay Tube.

=== Amtrak station ===
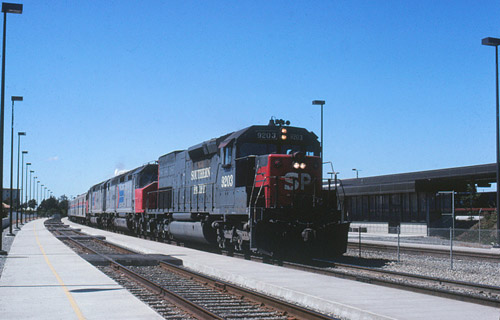
The San Francisco Zephyr at Richmond, 1980

Unlike other large cities, the Bay Area did not have a convenient transfer location between Amtrak intercity service and local rapid transit; 16th Street station in Oakland was not located near a BART station. The introduction of the San Joaquin service in 1974 added a third round trip to the SP mainline north of Oakland. A $667,000 Amtrak station adjacent to the BART station opened for use by the San Joaquin plus the long-distance San Francisco Zephyr and Coast Starlight on October 30, 1977. It included two 18-car-long platforms, with stairs and an elevator from a small station building to the under-track passage.

Amtrak service gradually expanded; a second San Joaquin was added in 1980, and the Capitols (now Capitol Corridor) service began in 1991. Richmond was also served by the Spirit of California, which ran from 1981 to 1983. Disagreements between Caltrans and Amtrak over funding delayed the addition of a station agent until September 1982.

The Coast Starlight ceased to stop at Richmond in April 1996, followed by the California Zephyr (successor to the San Francisco Zephyr) in October 1998. Richmond was the only transfer point between Amtrak and BART until the Amtrak platform at Oakland Coliseum station (which is served only by the Capitol Corridor) opened in 2005.

=== Renovations ===
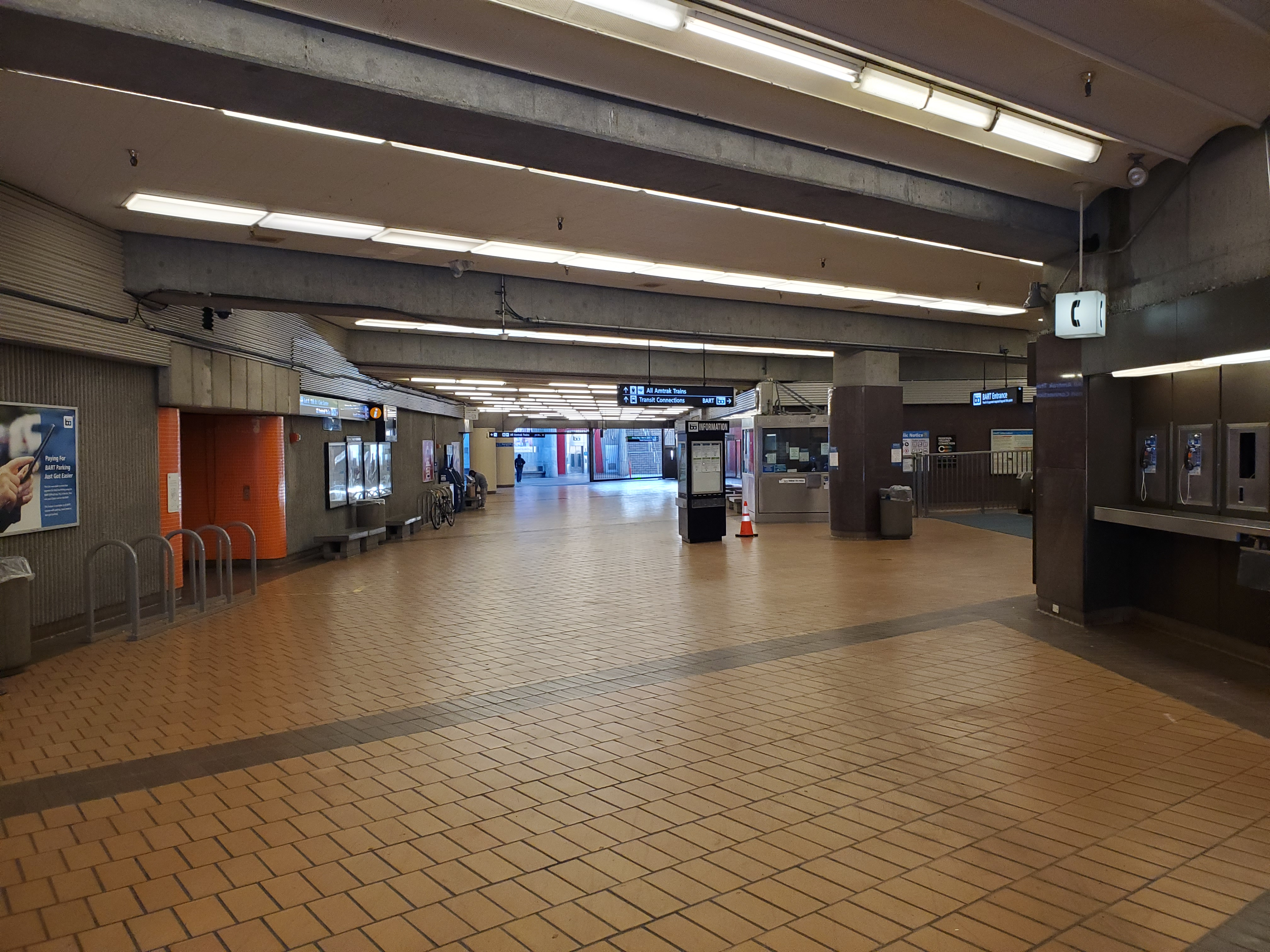
The under-track concourse in 2021

The Amtrak station building was closed on December 1, 1997, though trains continued to stop. On April 12, 2000, BART and the city broke ground on a "transit village", a mixed-use transit-oriented development (TOD) project adjacent to the station. In July 2001, the aging Amtrak facility was replaced with a modern island platform with better access to the BART pedestrian tunnel. The $1.9 million project, funded by the state, was intended to improve the station as preparation for the transit village. The developer for the transit village was chosen in 2002. A 2004 BART plan indicated that additional faregates and expansion of the paid area would be needed by 2025.

The first phase of the transit village, completed in 2004, included 132 residential units and 15,000 square feet (1,400 m^{2}) of retail space on the west side of the station. A $6.4 million renovation of the station was undertaken as part of the transit village project. The project included expanded entrances to the concourse, with a canopy over the west entrance. Richmond station was officially named the Richmond Transit Center at a dedication ceremony on October 18, 2007. A BART ticket window opened at the station in August 2008, joining seven other major stations in the system. The 750-space parking garage opened on May 30, 2013, with the surface lot on the east side of the station closed at that time.

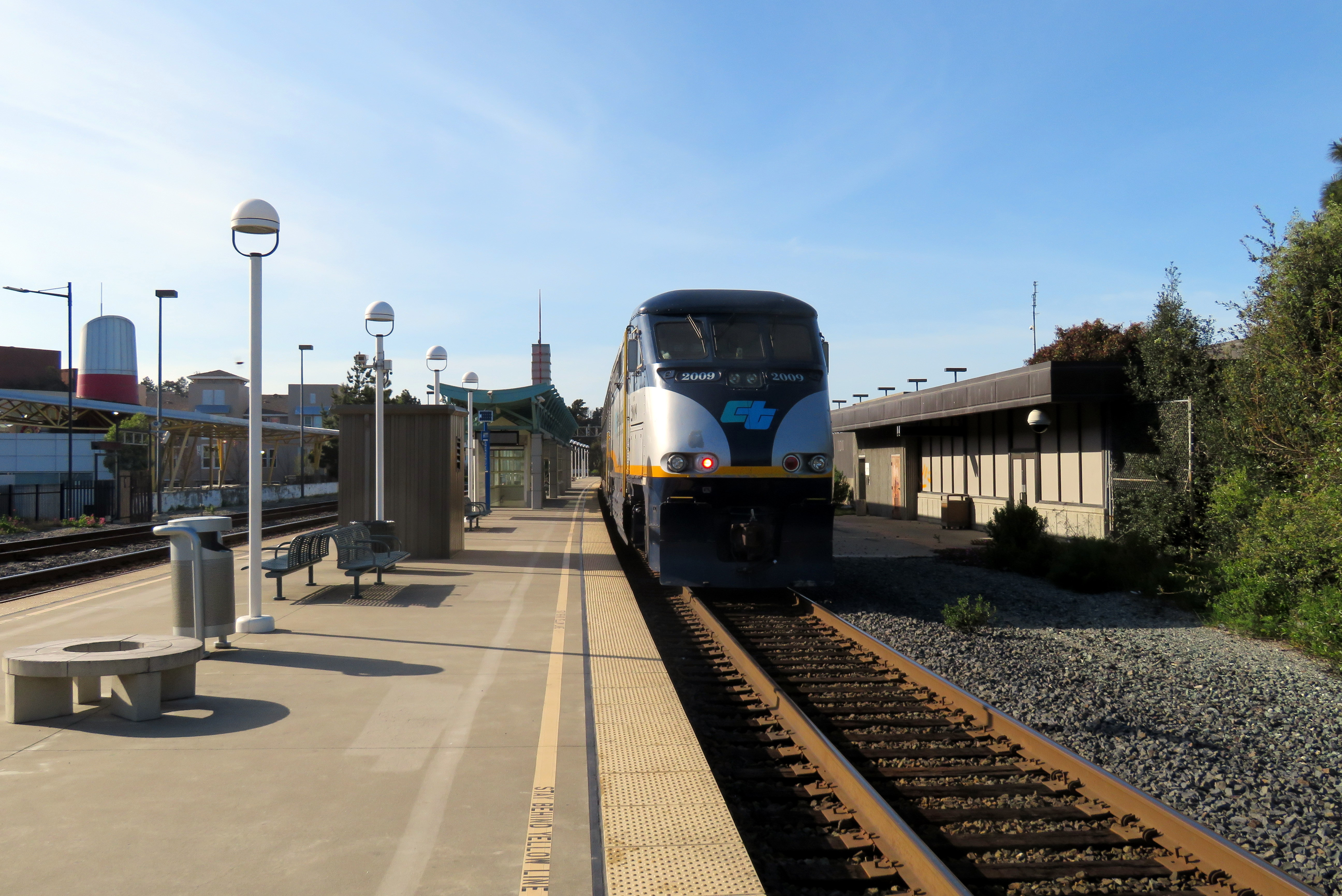
A Capitol Corridor train at the station in 2018, with the former shelter at right

The two long-distance trains began stopping at Richmond again on November 8, 2010. However, the Coast Starlight stop was again discontinued on January 14, 2013 because the train was scheduled to arrive at night – if it was several hours late, passengers would be unable to exit through the concourse, which is locked outside of BART service hours. In 2018, BART and CCJPA installed a "courtesy light" on the Amtrak platform, which instructs northbound Capitol Corridor trains to hold for two minutes if a BART train is arriving to allow passengers to make their connection. Reconstruction of the Amtrak platform and stairs for accessibility began in FY 2023 and is planned for completion in FY 2025. Installation of second-generation BART faregates at the station took place from September 3–13, 2024.

As of 2024, a second phase of the transit village is planned with 520 residential units on the east side of the station. BART indicates "significant market, local support, and/or implementation barriers" that must be overcome to allow TOD over the busway. That third phase of development would not begin until at least the mid-2030s.
