= Berkeley station (Amtrak) =

Amtrak station in Berkeley, California, US

Berkeley, CA
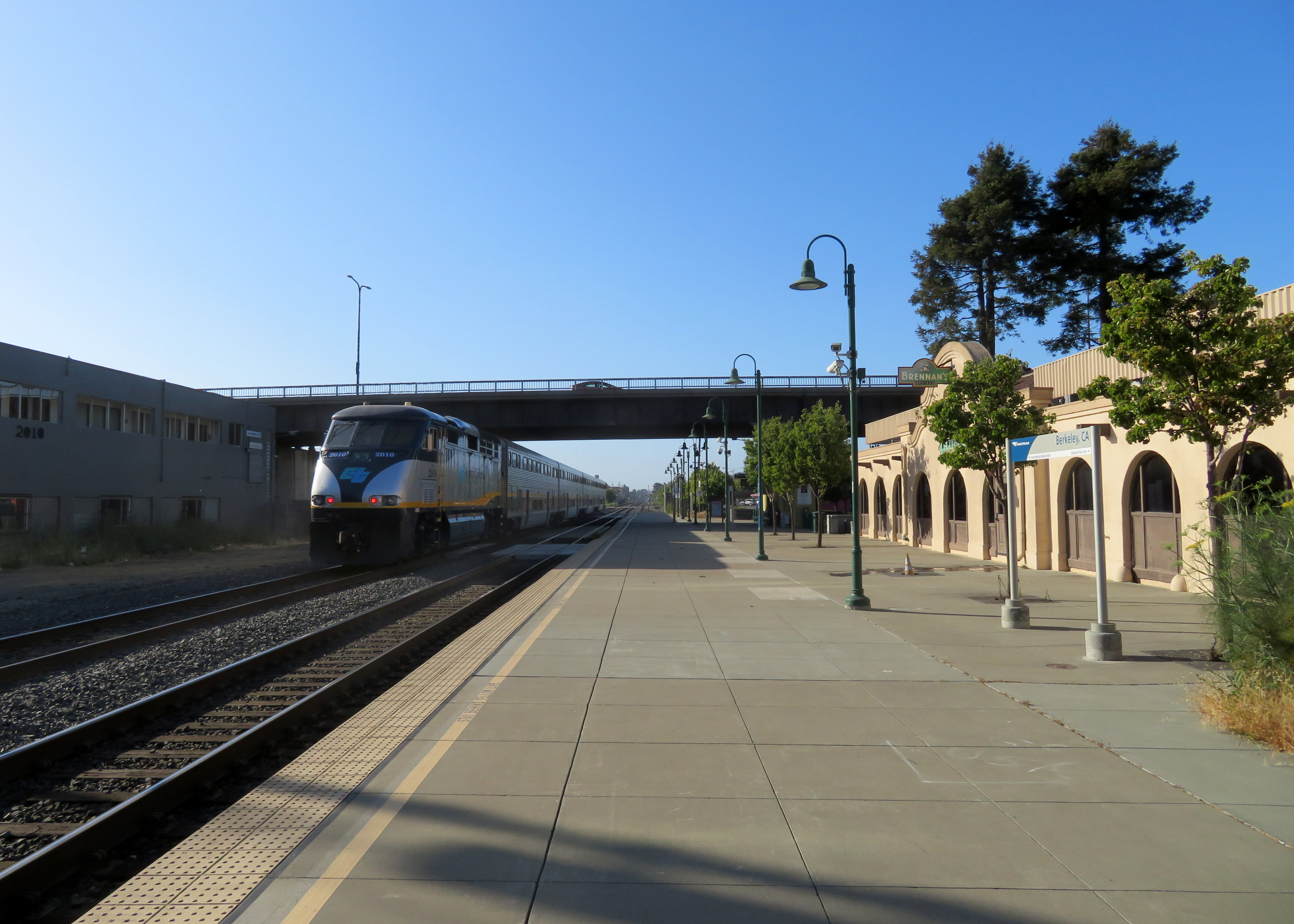
- A San Joaquin train passing the station in 2018

General information
- Location: University Avenue and Third Street; Berkeley, California; United States
- Coordinates: 37°52′02″N 122°18′03″W
- Line: UP Martinez Subdivision
- Platforms: 1 side platform
- Tracks: 2
- Connections: AC Transit: 51B, 802

Other information
- Station code: Amtrak: BKY

History
- Opened: 1913, 1986
- Closed: April 30, 1971
- Rebuilt: 2005
- Former names: West Berkeley

Passengers
- FY 2025: 99,353 (Amtrak)

Services
Preceding station	Amtrak	Following station
Emeryville toward San Jose	Capitol Corridor	Richmond toward Auburn
California Zephyr does not stop here
Coast Starlight does not stop here
Gold Runner does not stop here
Former services
Preceding station	Amtrak	Following station
Emeryville toward Oakland–Jack London Square	San Joaquins 1986–1993	Richmond toward Bakersfield
Preceding station	Southern Pacific Railroad	Following station
Oakland toward Oakland Pier	Shasta Route	Richmond toward Portland
Oakland toward Oakland Pier	Overland Route	Richmond toward Ogden
Oakland Terminus	San Joaquin Daylight	Richmond toward Los Angeles
Location

Berkeley station is an Amtrak station in Berkeley, California, served by Amtrak California's Capitol Corridor service. The station is located under the University Avenue overpass just west of 4th Street. It is served directly by AC Transit bus routes 51B and 802; additionally, AC Transit Transbay routes FS, G, and Z stop nearby at 6th Street.

== History ==
The first Berkeley station along the east shore was located at the Delaware Street railroad crossing, appearing on timetables as West Berkeley to differentiate it from the then-operating downtown station. The modern station building was built by the Southern Pacific in 1913.

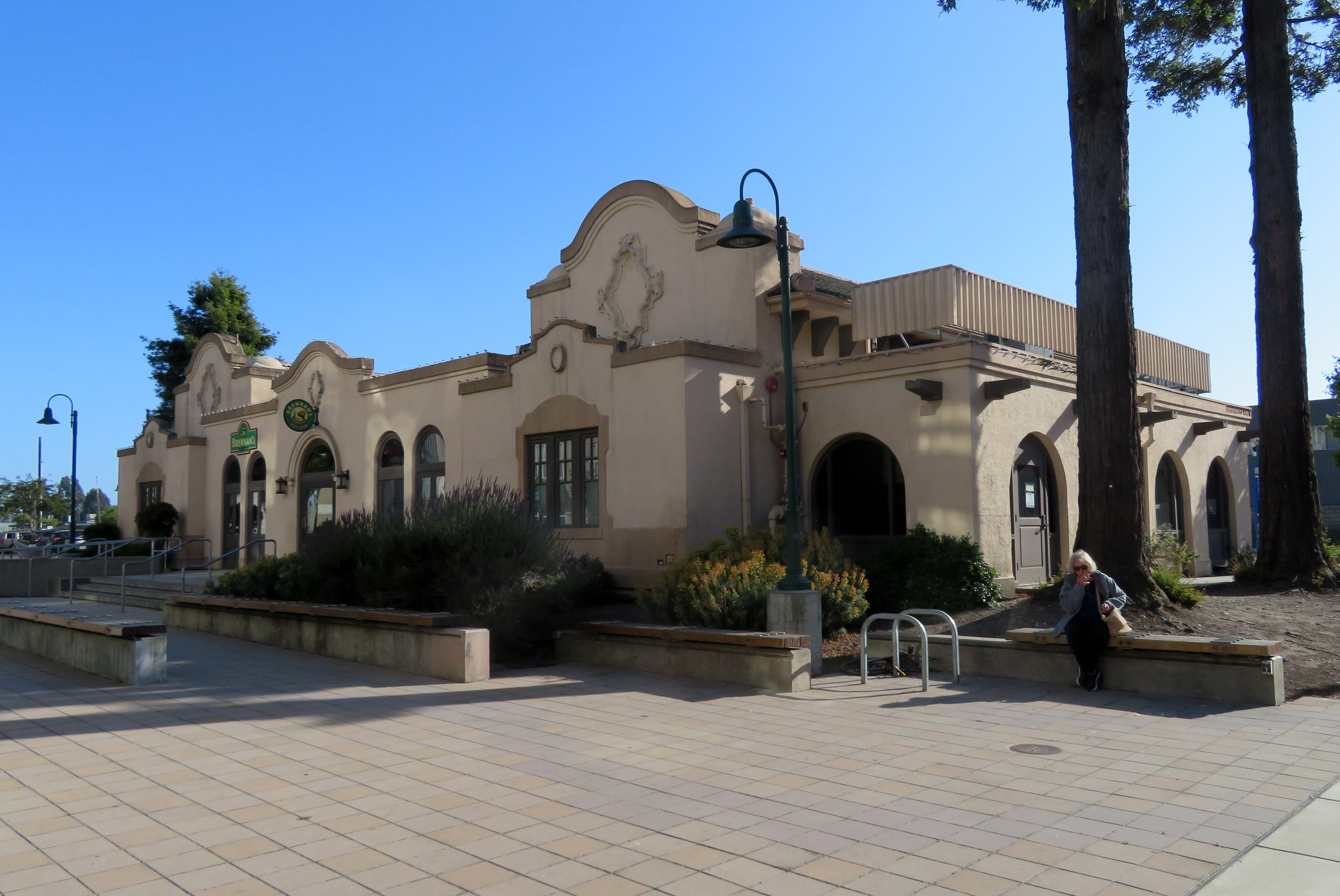
The former station building in 2018

Amtrak California service at Berkeley began in 1986 with the twice-daily San Joaquins, which then operated between Oakland and Bakersfield. Berkeley was an original stop on the Capitol Corridor (originally named Capitols) when that service began in late 1991. San Joaquins service at Berkeley ended in 1993 because of low ridership, but trains continue to pass through the station without stopping. The station building was designated a Berkeley Landmark in 2001.

The current platform opened on September 17, 2005, after a $2.4-million renovation. Additional renovation work included installation of nighttime lighting, benches and landscaping; improved access for people with disabilities; and street repaving and new striping for more efficient access by buses, bicycles, paratransit, shuttles and taxis.

The original Southern Pacific station building has since been turned into a restaurant. From the early 1970s through the early 2000s, the China Station Restaurant had used the depot, having converted it in 1974 after the Southern Pacific discontinued its railroad use. From the mid 1990s to 2007, the depot was used by Xanadu Restaurant. Brennan's Restaurant operated in the space between 2008 and 2018.

== See also ==
- Berkeley station (Southern Pacific Railroad) for a different Southern Pacific station (now demolished)
