= Emeryville station =

Amtrak station in Emeryville, California, US

Emeryville, CA
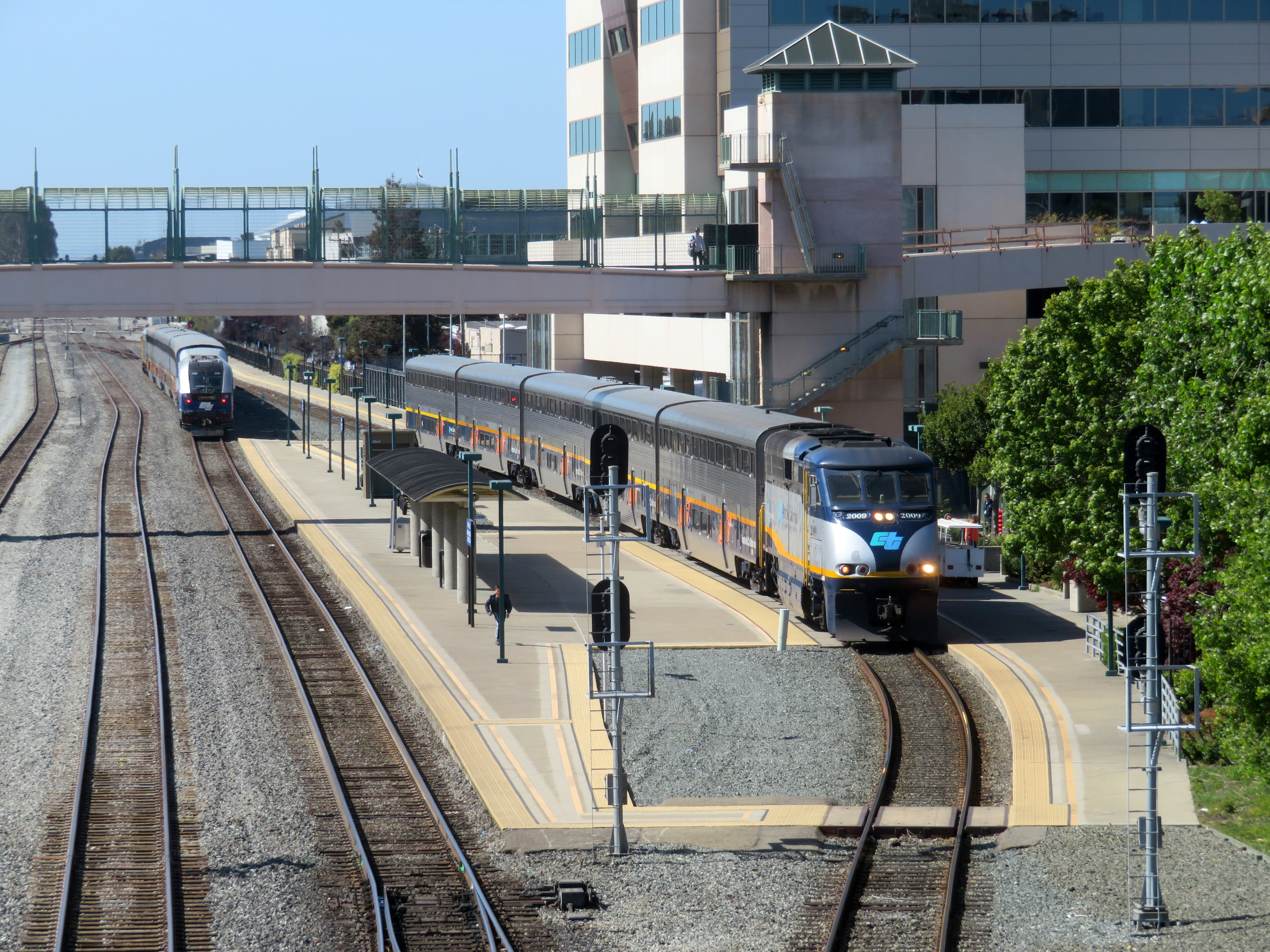
- San Joaquins (left) and Capitol Corridor (right) trains at the station

General information
- Location: 5885 Horton Street; Emeryville, California; United States
- Coordinates: 37.840682°N 122.292477°W
- Owner: City of Emeryville
- Line: UP Martinez Subdivision
- Platforms: 1 side platform, 1 island platform
- Tracks: 5
- Connections: AC Transit: 7, 29, 36, 57; Amtrak Thruway: 99; Emery Go-Round: Hollis, Shellmound/Powell

Construction
- Parking: Yes
- Cycle facilities: Yes
- Accessible: Yes

Other information
- Status: Staffed, checked baggage service available
- Station code: Amtrak: EMY

History
- Opened: August 13, 1993

Passengers
- FY 2025: 444,451 (Amtrak)

Services
Preceding station	Amtrak	Following station
Terminus	California Zephyr	Richmond toward Chicago
Oakland–Jack London Square toward San Jose	Capitol Corridor	Berkeley toward Auburn
Oakland–Jack London Square toward Los Angeles	Coast Starlight	Martinez toward Seattle
Oakland–Jack London Square Terminus	Gold Runner	Richmond toward Bakersfield
Former services
Preceding station	Amtrak	Following station
Oakland–Jack London Square (1995–1997) Terminus	California Zephyr	Richmond toward Chicago
Oakland (until 1994) Terminus	California Zephyr	Richmond toward Chicago
Location

Emeryville station is an Amtrak station in Emeryville, California, United States. The station is served by the California Zephyr, Capitol Corridor, Coast Starlight, and Gold Runner. The station is the primary connection point for Amtrak Thruway buses serving San Francisco.

Emeryville station has one side platform and one island platform serving the eastern two tracks of the Union Pacific Railroad Martinez Subdivision. The other three tracks are only used by freight trains. A pedestrian bridge connects the side platform and station building with commercial areas on Shellmound Street to the west.

== History ==
=== Southern Pacific Railroad ===
Central Pacific Railroad completed the Berkeley Branch Railroad in 1876, followed by the mainline toward Richmond and beyond in 1878. Stations were located on the mainline at Emerys (Park Avenue), Shellmound, and Montague Street (now 59th Street), plus at San Pablo Avenue on the branch line. By the time the lines were under Southern Pacific Railroad (SP) control a decade later, the Montague Street station was gone and the Emerys (later Emery and Emeryvillle) stop had been moved a block south to Yerba Buena Avenue, where the line crossed the California and Nevada Railroad. Stock Yards station in Butchertown was established by 1905.

The SP expanded suburban service with its East Bay Electric Lines subsidiary in 1911. Initial electric service to Berkeley mostly used the existing San Pablo Avenue station, with limited stops at Shell Mound, Emery, and B Street (34th Street); non-electric suburban service on the mainline stopped at Shell Mound. Additional branch lines and local stops were later added; by 1932, these stops included Powell Street and Folsom Street on the 9th Street line, and Green Street on the California Street line. The East Bay Electric Lines were closed in July 1941, ending passenger service to Emeryville.

=== Amtrak ===
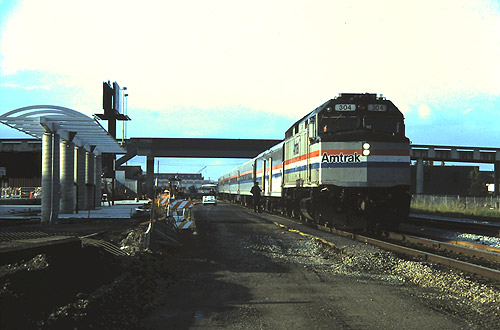
A train at the under-construction station in May 1994

Oakland Central station, Amtrak's primary stop for Oakland (and San Francisco via connecting buses) was damaged in the 1989 Loma Prieta earthquake; Amtrak began using a temporary station at the site. A new station was quickly constructed in nearby Emeryville – close to the San Francisco–Oakland Bay Bridge – on the site of a former cement plant. Emeryville station opened on August 13, 1993, though construction was not completed until the next year. Only the Capitols and San Joaquins initially moved to Emeryville; long-distance trains continued to use Oakland Central while track work at Emeryville continued.

The California Zephyr and Coast Starlight began stopping at Emeryville on August 5, 1994. Oakland Central station closed on August 21; Emeryville was the only Oakland-area stop for Amtrak until the new Oakland – Jack London Square station opened on May 22, 1995. Emeryville station cost $7 million to construct. It became a centerpiece of redevelopment of formerly industrial areas of Emeryville. A footbridge connecting the station with parking lots and new development on the west side of the tracks was opened in 1997.

The California Zephyr was re-extended to Oakland with the opening of the Jack London Square station in 1995. However, this required a complicated reverse move along street running tracks to reach the wye at West Oakland. The train was cut back to Emeryville on October 26, 1997. In 2022, the station was formally named for former city council member Nora Davis. As of 2024, Amtrak plans to modify the platform for accessibility by FY 2026.

== Bus connections ==
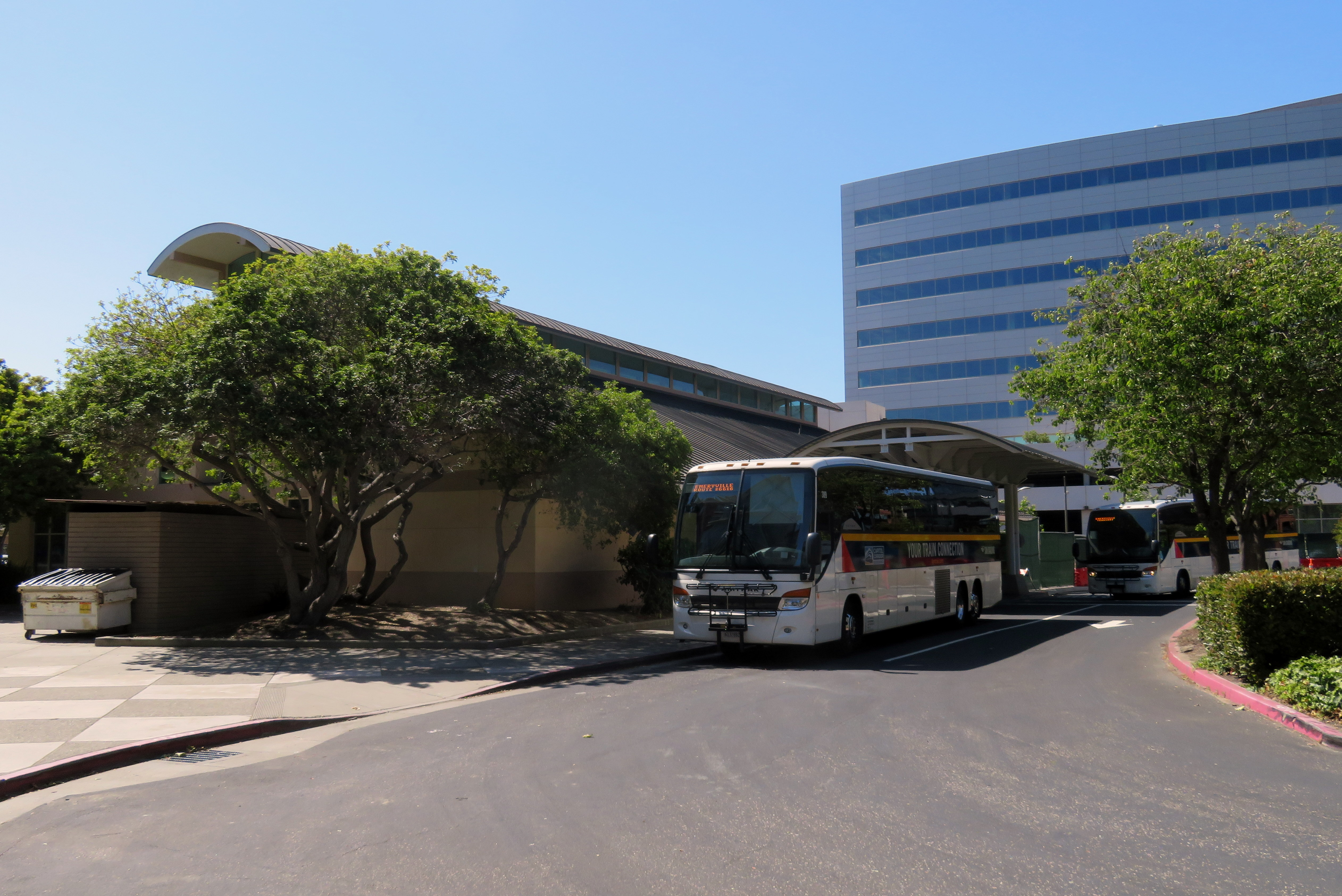
Thruway buses at Emeryville station

Because Emeryville is the closest station to the San Francisco–Oakland Bay Bridge, it is the primary connection point between Amtrak trains and Amtrak Thruway bus service in the Bay Area. Amtrak Thruway route 99 buses run between Emeryville station and the Salesforce Transit Center in downtown San Francisco, providing connections for all trains. However, Oakland – Jack London Square station is used for San Francisco connections for the southern leg of the Coast Starlight, as well as some Thruway routes that run along the coast to Southern California.

Several public transit bus lines also serve the station vicinity:

- The free Emery Go-Round Hollis and Shellmound/Powell routes stop near the station, connecting to the MacArthur BART station.
- AC Transit routes 7, 36, and 57 stop on Shellmound Street, across the pedestrian bridge located at the station, while route 29 stops on Hollis Street one block east of the station.
