= Dreamstar Lines =

American private railroad company

Overview
- Service type: Inter-city medium distance rail
- Status: Planned
- Locale: California
- First service: 2028 (anticipated)
- Current operator: Dreamstar Lines
- Website: dreamstarlines.com

Route
- Termini: Union Station, Los Angeles, California, US; 4th and King Street station, San Francisco, California
- Line used: Coast Line

Technical
- Track gauge: 4 ft 8 1/2 in (1,435 mm) standard gauge
- Electrification: None
- Operating speed: Top: Average:
- Track owners: Union Pacific; Caltrain; Metrolink

Dreamstar Lines is a privately owned passenger railroad company based in Newport Beach, California. Dreamstar is planning a nightly inter-city service between Los Angeles and San Francisco, tentatively named the Golden Coast Express. The train would share the same routes as Amtrak, Metrolink, and Caltrain, utilizing the historic "Coast Line" owned by Union Pacific. The company aims to provide a premium "hotel on wheels" experience to compete with short-haul flights. Service is anticipated to launch in 2028, succeeding the Lark that ended in 1968. The project is currently in the active development phase, having secured key rolling stock design partnerships with BMW Designworks and locomotive propulsion agreements with ZELTECH as of late 2025.

== History ==
Jake Vollebregt and Thomas Eastmond founded Dreamstar Lines in Newport Beach, CA. By 2023, the company publicized plans for an overnight "hotel train" as an alternative to flying, reviving a service that had discontinued 55 years prior. In April 2024, Joshua Dominic assumed leadership of the project. That month, Dreamstar signed a memorandum of understanding with Union Pacific Railroad (UP) to operate trains on its right-of-way. On November 13, 2024, BMW's Santa Monica-based Designworks entered contracts to draw up railcar design concepts.

In March 2025, Dreamstar secured a strategic investment from real estate executive Bill Lyon, ensuring continued capital for the pre-operations phase. In November 2025, the compsny announced a joint venture with Zero-Emission Locomotive Technologies (ZELTECH) and HyOrc to develop and acquire Rankine-powered hybrid locomotives aimed at meeting California's strict emission standards.

== Service ==
=== Overview ===
Under Dreamstar's current proposal, two trains, one headed north and one headed south, would run every night, departing from each terminus at 10:00 p.m. and arriving at their final destination the next day at 8:30 a.m. This schedule is designed to maximize business days in both cities, similar to the red-eye travel used in commercial flying. The trains would have intermediate station stops and crew turnovers in San Jose, San Luis Obispo and Santa Barbara, points near each end of the route.

Dreamstar's trainsets would consist of restored historic bi-level cars heavily modernized with Art Deco-inspired interiors. Onboard amenities include two sleeping arrangements; private rooms with lie-flat beds and premium bedrooms; a lounge with open seating and bar, as well as breakfast delivery. The amenities would be split among four planned classes: family, bedroom, suite, and standard. The standard class would be the highest class on level with first class on international flights. In updated design documents released in 2025, Dreamstar confirmed plans to allow passenger to transport their personal automobiles on the train, an accommodation not dissimilar to Amtrak's Auto Train on the East Coast.

Dreamstar is expected to commence service in 2028, ahead of the 2028 Los Angeles Olympics.

=== Train route ===
Under the plan, Dreamstar would operate between Union Station in Los Angeles and 4th and King Street station in San Francisco. The train would travel through California's Central Coast region on a railroad line known as the "Coast Line", which is owned by UP and also serves Amtrak's Coast Starlight and Pacific Surfliner, Metrolink's Ventura County Line between Los Angeles and Montalvo, and the Caltrain corridor between Gilroy and San Francisco. As of 2025, Dreamstar is negotiating track access agreements with Metrolink and Caltrain. The route includes planned intermediate stops at Santa Barbara, San Luis Obispo, and San Jose Diridon. Dreamstar's service follows a similar route to Southern Pacific's Lark, which ran from 1910 to 1968, as well as Amtrak's short-lived early 1980s Spirit of California.

== See also ==
- California High-Speed Rail
- Coast Starlight
- Spirit of California
