= Lark (train) =

Historic passenger train service in California

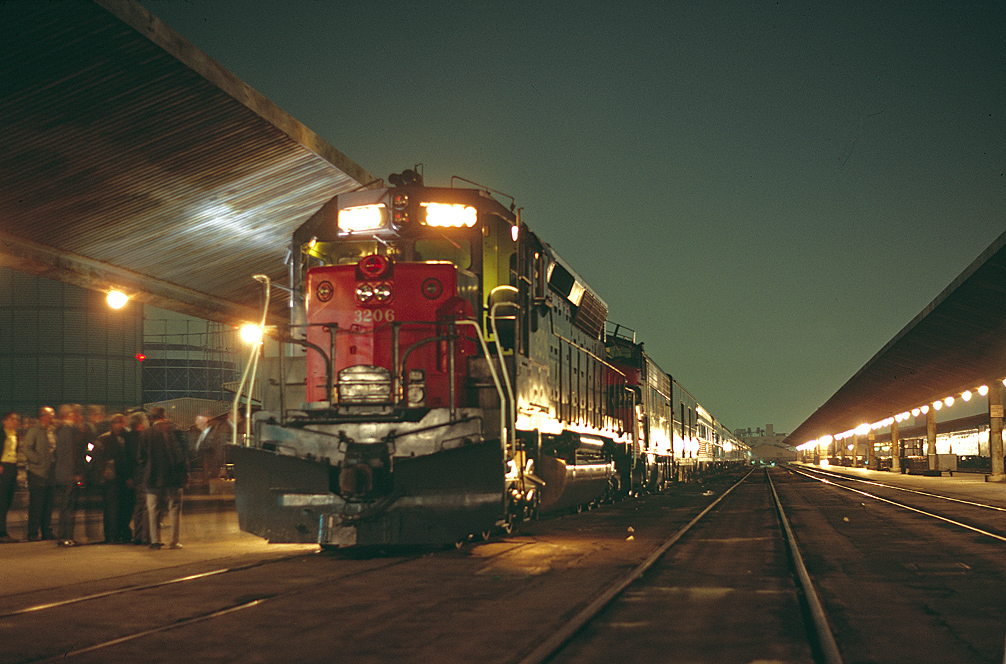
- The final Lark prepares to depart Union Station in Los Angeles on April 8, 1968.

Overview
- Service type: Inter-city rail
- Status: Discontinued
- Locale: California
- First service: May 8, 1910; March 2, 1941 (streamlined)
- Last service: April 8, 1968
- Former operator: Southern Pacific

Route
- Termini: San Francisco, California; Los Angeles, California
- Distance travelled: 470 miles (760 km)
- Average journey time: 11 hours 30 minutes
- Service frequency: Daily
- Train numbers: 76 (southbound), 75 (northbound)

On-board services
- Seating arrangements: coaches
- Sleeping arrangements: sleeper service

Technical
- Track gauge: 1,435 mm (4 ft 8 1/2 in)

The Lark was an overnight passenger train of the Southern Pacific Company on the 470-mile (760 km) run between San Francisco and Los Angeles. It became a streamliner in 1941 and was discontinued on April 8, 1968. The Lark ran along the same route as the Coast Daylight and was often pulled by a locomotive wearing the famous Daylight paint scheme of orange, red, and black.

== Overview ==
After 1941, Southern Pacific trains 75 (northbound) and 76 (southbound) were deluxe all-room Pullman (sleeping car) trains between San Francisco's Third and Townsend Depot and Los Angeles's Union Station. The last two cars in each consist of the Lark ran along the east side of San Francisco Bay to Oakland and were known as the Oakland Lark. The Lark was to overnight travelers what the Morning Daylight and Noon Daylight were to day travelers in the San Francisco–Los Angeles market: safe, reliable, deluxe transportation. The Lark was the only streamlined all-room sleeping car train to operate entirely within a single state and the only all-room train operating strictly on the West Coast.

The train's namesake, though neither nocturnal nor native to the New World, has historically symbolized the arrival of a new day, mainly through Chaucer (The Knight's Tale of The Canterbury Tales) and Shakespeare's sonnets which describe the lark's singing at first light.

== History ==
The Southern Pacific Railroad started overnight trains 75 and 76, the Lark, on May 8, 1910. The SP ensured first-class service with the latest equipment, top-flight restaurant and lounge service and a choice of accommodations. In 1921 the schedule was 13¾ hours each way.

The Padre ran overnight between Los Angeles and Oakland on the Coast Line; it was replaced in 1931 by the Oakland Lark that ran Oakland to San Jose and was coupled onto the Lark to continue to Los Angeles. (Oakland had another SP overnight train, the Owl between Oakland Pier and Los Angeles via the San Joaquin Valley and Tehachapi Loop.)

In 1937, Southern Pacific introduced the Coast Daylight, a colorful set of streamlined cars in red and orange pulled by a 4-8-4 "Northern" steam locomotive streamlined in the same colors. In 1940 the SP added a second Daylight to the Coast Route and in July 1941 started the San Joaquin Daylight via Fresno.

On March 2, 1941, the Lark became a streamlined 12-hour train with cars in two shades of gray pulled by the same locomotives that pulled the Daylights. This Lark had three of the five types of pre-war lightweight streamlined Pullman cars: the 100-series 10-roomette, 5-double bedroom; the 200-series 4-double bedroom, 4-compartment, 2-drawing room; and the 300-series 13-double bedroom. Food and beverage service was provided by the Lark Club, a three-car articulated food service unit (kitchen/crew dormitory car, dining room car, and tavern-lounge car from front to rear) that became known for late-night business transactions and a place to share a nightcap, and in the morning, offered a full breakfast menu. Late-night refreshments were also offered in the 400-series sleeper-buffet-lounge-observation car which had two bedrooms, a compartment and a drawing room and carried the illuminated Lark drumhead on the rear (and formed half of the peacetime Oakland Lark).

The two original observation cars, which had been built in April 1941, had short working lives – the 400 was wrecked at Wellsona, California on September 19, 1941, while the 401 was written off after an accident at Casmalia, California, on December 5, 1942. They were replaced by the Pullman reassigning existing cars – the second 400 was the former 1939 New York World's Fair exhibition car American Milemaster, the replacement 401 was previously the experimental Muskingum River. Both cars were rebuilt with flat-ended observation lounges in 1956.

During World War II, coaches were added to the train along with 500-series 6-section, 6-roomette, 4-double bedroom cars reassigned from Overland Route service to the Oakland Lark. A few 9000-series 10-roomette, 6-double bedroom and 9300-series 22-roomette sleeping cars were built for the train in 1950, replacing some of the 1941 cars which were reassigned to other SP trains. Diesels replaced the last steam locomotives in January 1955.

More businessmen were leaving the train for the airlines. On July 15, 1957, the Lark was combined with the Starlight, an overnight chair car train. The Lark kept its name and number but was no longer all-Pullman. The Oakland Lark was discontinued in 1960. The 1960s saw the removal of the triple-unit diner/lounge and the replacement of the two-tone gray color scheme by silver with a red stripe. The "Daylight" colors were also gone from the locomotives, replaced by dark gray with a red nose. By the mid-sixties an average of fewer than 100 passengers were riding.

The Southern Pacific tried to discontinue the Lark in late 1966 but public outcry and newspaper editorials urged the California Public Utilities Commission to order service for one more year. By the end of 1967, the Lark was down to a baggage car, one sleeping car, a couple of chair cars, and an Automat car, pulled by a 3,600-horsepower (2,700 kW) EMD SDP45. The train was still numbered 75 and 76. The Lark was finally discontinued on April 8, 1968.

== Communities served ==
Stations in parentheses:

- San Francisco, California (Third and Townsend Depot);
  - Oakland, California (Oakland Pier) -Oakland Lark discontinued, 1960;
- Burlingame, California;
- Palo Alto, California – Stanford University;
- San Jose, California (San Jose Diridon station);
- Watsonville Junction, California – Watsonville/Santa Cruz;
- Salinas, California (Salinas Intermodal Transportation Center) – Monterey Peninsula;
- San Luis Obispo, California;
- Guadalupe, California – Santa Maria;
- Santa Barbara, California;
- Ventura, California;
- Glendale, California – Hollywood/Burbank/Pasadena;
- Los Angeles, California (Los Angeles Union Station)

== Locomotives ==
The SP assigned streamlined GS-3 and GS-4 4-8-4 "Northern" steam locomotives painted in the Daylight colors of two shades of orange. The SP never painted any locomotives in the Lark colors of two-tone gray.

They were replaced by American Locomotive Company (ALCO) PA-1 cab units and PB-1 booster units and General Motors Electro-Motive Division (EMD) E7A cab units and E7B booster units diesel locomotives in two-shades of orange, later painted dark gray with red nose.

Other equipment used included EMD F7A cab units and F7B booster units. These were originally painted black (described as "Black Widow") with silver nose and two-shades of orange stripes, later painted dark gray with red nose. During its final months, the train was powered by EMD SDP45 hood units painted dark gray with red nose.

== Equipment used ==
First Consist	Car Type	Second Consist
4433	GS-4 Streamlined 4-8-4 locomotive	4437
6084	Modernized heavyweight baggage car	6088
4117	Modernized heavyweight baggage, 30-foot railway post office car	4118
100	10-roomette, 5-double-bedroom sleeping car	105
101	10-roomette, 5-double-bedroom sleeping car	106
102	10-roomette, 5-double-bedroom sleeping car	107
103	10-roomette, 5-double-bedroom sleeping car	108
300	13-double-bedroom sleeping car	303
301	13-double-bedroom sleeping car	304
200	4-compartment, 4-double bedroom, 2-drawing-room sleeping car	203
10274; 10275; 10276	Articulated 18-crew-dormitory–kitchen unit Articulated 48-seat dining room unit Articulated 48-seat tavern lounge bar unit	10277; 10278; 10279
201	4-compartment, 4-double-bedroom, 2-drawing-room sleeping car	204
202	4-compartment, 4-double-bedroom, 2-drawing-room sleeping car	205
302	13-double-bedroom sleeping car	305
306	13-double-bedroom sleeping car	307
104	10-roomette, 5-double-bedroom sleeping car (Oakland Lark)	109
400	2-double-bedroom, 1-compartment, 1-drawing-room, buffet, 27-seat lounge observation car (Oakland Lark)	401

== See also ==
- Spirit of California, Amtrak overnight train over Oakland Lark route
- Dreamstar Lines, a company planning new overnight train for Los Angeles and San Francisco

== Bibliography ==
- Durbin, Arthur D. (1997). Pullman Paint and Lettering Notebook. Waukesha, Wis.: Kalmbach Publishing Company. ISBN 0-89024-291-7.
