= Oakland–Jack London Square station =

Railway station in Oakland, California, US

Oakland–Jack London Square
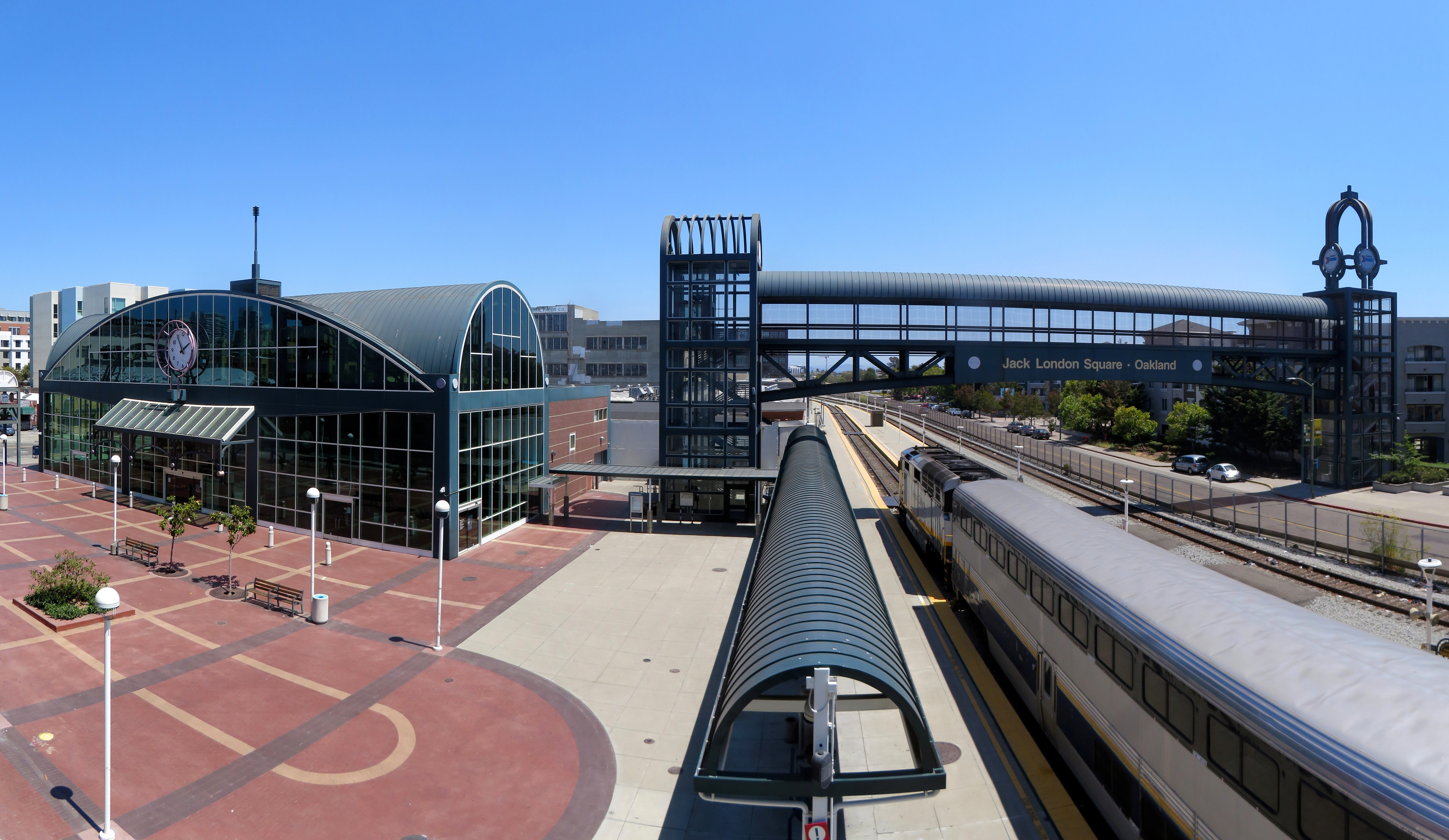
- Jack London Square station with a Capitol Corridor train in 2020

General information
- Other names: Oakland–Jack London Square/C. L. Dellums Station
- Location: 245 2nd Street; Oakland, California; United States
- Coordinates: 37°47′37″N 122°16′17″W
- Owner: Port of Oakland
- Line: UP Niles Subdivision
- Platforms: 1 side platform, 1 island platform
- Tracks: 3
- Connections: AC Transit: 12; Amtrak Thruway: 17

Construction
- Parking: 500 short term, 500 long term
- Cycle facilities: Yes
- Accessible: Yes

Other information
- Status: Staffed, checked baggage service available
- Station code: Amtrak: OKJ

History
- Opened: May 22, 1995

Passengers
- FY 2025: 246,499 (Amtrak)

Services
| Preceding station | Amtrak | Following station |
|---|---|---|
| Oakland Coliseum toward San Jose | Capitol Corridor | Emeryville toward Auburn |
| San Jose toward Los Angeles | Coast Starlight | Emeryville toward Seattle |
| Terminus | Gold Runner | Emeryville toward Bakersfield |
Former services
| Preceding station | Amtrak | Following station |
|---|---|---|
| Terminus | California Zephyr (1995–1997) | Emeryville toward Chicago |
At Oakland–1st Street station
| Preceding station | Southern Pacific Railroad | Following station |
| Oakland Pier Terminus | Oakland – San Jose (ended 1960) | Fruitvale toward San Jose |
Location

Oakland–Jack London Square station is a train station in Jack London Square (itself named after the author) of Oakland, California, United States. The station is served by Amtrak's Capitol Corridor, Coast Starlight, and Gold Runner trains. It is officially named Oakland–Jack London Square/C. L. Dellums Station after C. L. Dellums, co-founder of the Brotherhood of Sleeping Car Porters; a statue of Dellums stands outside the station.

== Station design ==
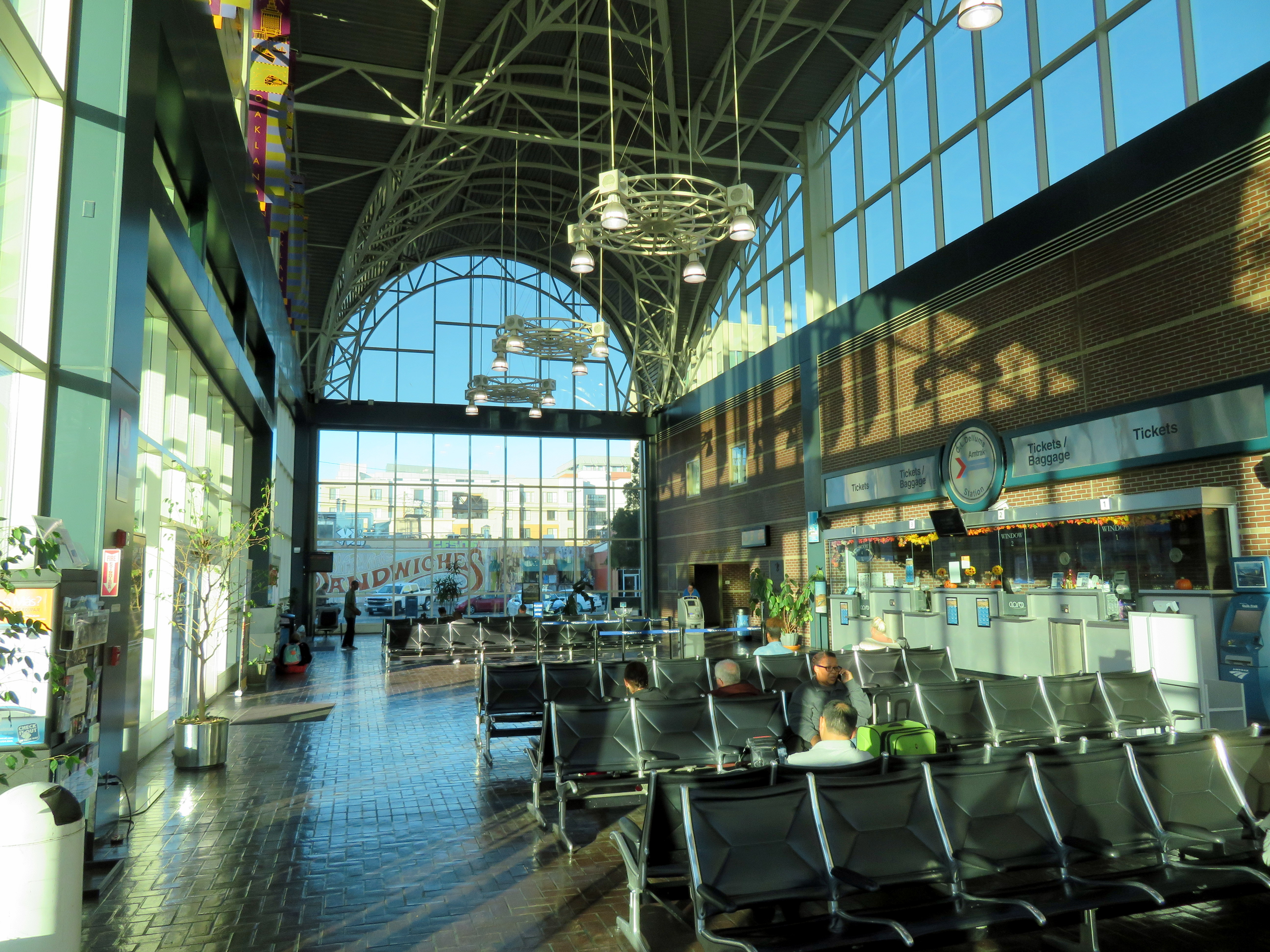
Interior of the station in 2018

The station is located in the southeastern part of the Jack London Square district of Oakland, California. The two-track Union Pacific Railroad Niles Subdivision runs approximately northwest–southwest along Embarcadero West through Jack London Square, with a siding splitting off from the north main track (Main 2) through the station area. A 1,530-foot (470 m) side platform serves the siding; a 1,000-foot (300 m) island platform is located between the siding and north main track. The south main track (Main 1) is freight-only. The station is fully accessible.

The glass-faced station building, owned by the Port of Oakland, is located on the north side of the tracks in the block bounded by Embarcadero West, 2nd Street, Alice Street, and Jackson Street. It was designed by Oakland architect Eli Naor. The northwest half of the 16,000-square-foot (1,500 m^{2}) building is a 5,000-square-foot (460 m^{2}) waiting room; the remaining portion has two floors of offices and baggage space. The 40-foot (12 m)-high waiting room has a ceiling of crossed steel vaults from which five 8-foot (2.4 m)-diameter chandeliers hang. Two wooden benches from 16th Street station originally sat among modern seating in the waiting room. An 8 1/2-foot (2.6 m)-diameter clock is on the northwest facade of the building.

A footbridge with elevators at east end crosses the tracks and Embarcadero West adjacent to the station building. The main span is 140 feet (43 m) long, with the deck 35 feet (11 m) above track level. The steel members of the bridge are larger than structurally needed for aesthetic reasons. A parking garage with 500 short-term and 500 long-term spaces is located west of the station building. A second footbridge over the tracks and road connects the garage to several buildings. A statue of C. L. Dellums, for whom the station is officially named, stands in the plaza between the station building and garage.

Amtrak Thruway buses to/from San Francisco connect at Emeryville, which is closer to the San Francisco–Oakland Bay Bridge. However, Oakland is the northern end of Thruway route 17, which connects to the Pacific Surfliner at Santa Barbara. The station does not have direct connections to other regional transit; it is about 2,400 feet (730 m) east of the Oakland Ferry Terminal served by the San Francisco Bay Ferry and 2,200 feet (670 m) southwest of Lake Merritt station served by Bay Area Rapid Transit (BART). AC Transit local bus route 12 directly serves the station on 2nd Street; other routes stop further away on Broadway and at Lake Merritt station.

== History ==
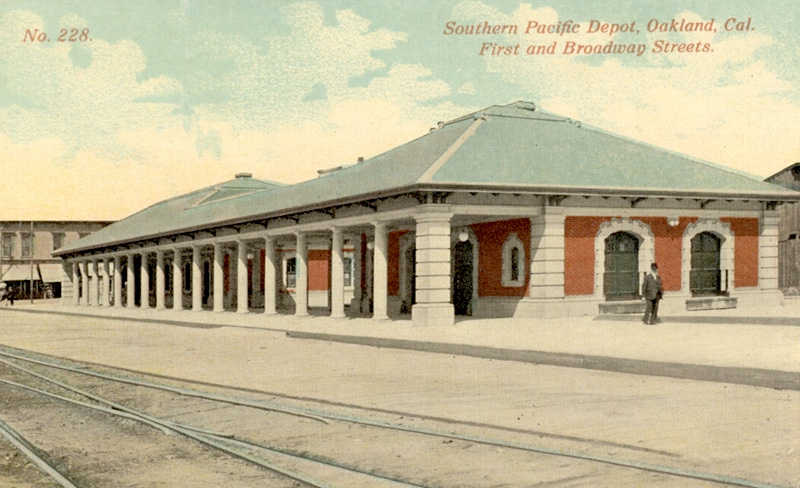
Postcard view of the Southern Pacific station at 1st and Broadway

The Southern Pacific Railroad (SP) had a downtown Oakland station on the north side of 1st Street between Franklin Street and Broadway. By midcentury, it was only used for Oakland–San Jose shuttle trains, which were discontinued in 1960. The SP's main Oakland station was 16th Street station, which Amtrak continued to use after taking over intercity passenger service in 1971.

=== Planning ===
By the late 1980s, officials planned to replace the aging 16th Street station with a new station in the Jack London Square area, which was undergoing redevelopment. In March 1989, the Port of Oakland won a $3.1 million state grant to fund part of the cost of a new station. 16th Street station was severely damaged in the 1989 Loma Prieta earthquake; an adjacent building was repurposed as a temporary station. In 1990, Jack London Square was among the proposed station sites for the Capitols service.

By late 1991, environmental work for the Jack London Square station was underway; proposed costs had quadrupled to $16 million from the $4 million projected in 1988. Capitols service began in December 1991, with 16th Street as the Oakland station. By August 1992, the Port planned to open a temporary platform at Jack London Square by July 1993, as Caltrans had ordered Amtrak to vacate 16th Street station by then to accommodate replacement of the Cypress Street Viaduct. The new station was then expected to fully open in August 1994.

In 1992, the adjacent city of Emeryville advanced plans for a new station of its own, intended to support redevelopment in the city. Emeryville officials advertised it as an interim replacement for 16th Street station, and that it would only see limited service after the Jack London Square station opened. However, Port of Oakland saw Emeryville station as a threat to the expected economic benefits of the Jack London Square station. Groundbreaking for the Jack London Square station was held on October 28, 1992 – one day after a "lease signing" ceremony in Emeryville.

=== Construction ===
In December 1992, the Port abandoned plans for the temporary platform in order to speed construction of the permanent station, with the aim of having it open by December 1993. However, this was delayed by unexpectedly high costs for track work at the station. Demolition of a former newspaper warehouse to make way for the new station began in January 1993. Plans up to that point called for a 20,000-square-foot (1,900 m^{2}), two-story station building with a clock tower. In February 1993, the design was changed to a 15,000-square-foot (1,400 m^{2}), one-story station that would cost $13.5 million. Emeryville station ultimately opened on August 13, 1993.

In October 1993, bids for the station building came in $1.2 million higher than expected; the Port made cosmetic changes to reduce the cost and rebid the project. The Port awarded a $6.24 million contraction contract for the station building in February 1994 and leased the station to Amtrak for 66 years for $1. At that time, the Port also announced that the station would be named after C. L. Dellums, a longtime Oakland resident and the co-founder of the Brotherhood of Sleeping Car Porters. Construction began in March 1994.

By July 1994, the project was expected to cost $14.5 million – $9 million for the station and $5.5 million for track work – and be complete by the end of the year. 16th Street station closed in August 1994, at which time Emeryville became Amtrak's only Oakland-area station. The main span of the footbridge was installed on the night of November 5–6, 1994. The curved beams for the footbridge had to be fabricated in Arkansas, as no closer manufacturer was capable of the work. Heavy winter rains in 1994–1995 delayed the station's opening by an additional three months. The nearly-complete station was formally dedicated in honor of Dellums on May 12, 1995. The final project cost was $16 million.

=== Service changes and development ===
Oakland–Jack London Square station opened on May 22, 1995. Initial service consisted of the daily round trips of the California Zephyr and Coast Starlight plus the three daily round trips of the Capitols. The San Joaquins service (now known as the Gold Runner) was not initially extended to Oakland because of refusals by the SP. Any trains terminating at Oakland had to reverse to the West Oakland Yards (where a wye allowed trains to be turned) on street running tracks along Embarcadero West. Capitols trains had cab cars allowing bidirectional running (and most Capitols trains ran through Oakland rather than terminating), but San Joaquins and California Zephyr trains did not. (The new California Cars, which included cab cars, were not introduced on the San Joaquins until later in 1995.) SP allowed the Zephyr to be extended to Oakland because it would make the reverse move at less-crowded times.

Service to the station increased on April 14, 1996: a fourth Capitols round trip was added, and two of the four daily San Joaquins round trips were extended from Emeryville to Oakland. The remaining two San Joaquins round trips were extended to Oakland on November 10, 1996. The California Zephyr was cut back to Emeryville on October 27, 1997 – both to avoid the reverse move, and because the addition of mail and express cars earlier that year had made the train too long for the station's platform. A statue of Dellums was added in the plaza next to the station in December 1999.

The station has been an anchor for additional redevelopment in Jack London Square. Short-term parking was originally in a surface lot northwest of the station building, while long-term parking was across the tracks. A residential development replaced the long-term lot in 2001. In June 2004, the city approved a nine-building development in the Jack London Square district. It included a parking garage replacing the short-term packing lot, with a footbridge across the tracks connecting it to a public market. Construction on the garage and market began in October 2007. The garage opened on August 14, 2010; the public market was never opened due to the Great Recession and its building saw other uses.

Additional Capitols service were added from 1998 to 2006, reaching a peak of 16 weekday round trips; the service was renamed Capitol Corridor in 2001. A fifth San Joaquins round trip was added on June 20, 2016. A 2014 vision plan for the Capitol Corridor proposed several possible new alignments for passenger trains to avoid the street running through Jack London Square. These included a tunnel on the existing alignment, a tunnel under 5th Street, and a deep-bore tunnel under downtown Oakland. A 2016 implementation plan proposed a tunnel under 2nd Street with a new underground station at Broadway. A proposed second San Francisco–Oakland rail tunnel, Link21, may be built either as a BART extension or as mainline regional rail. An underground Jack London Square station was proposed on most of the Link21 concepts released in 2023.
