= Spirit of California =

Former Sacramento–Los Angeles Amtrak passenger train

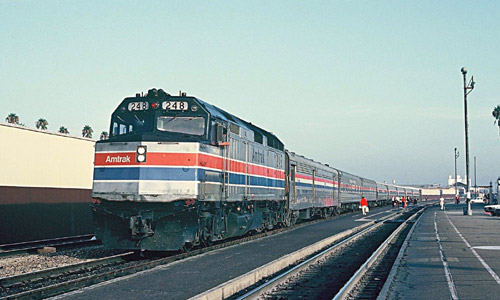
- The Spirit of California at Glendale station in 1982

Overview
- Service type: Inter-city rail
- Status: Discontinued
- Locale: California, United States
- First service: October 25, 1981
- Last service: September 30, 1983
- Former operator: Amtrak

Route
- Termini: Los Angeles, California; Sacramento, California
- Stops: 11
- Distance travelled: 552 miles (888 km)
- Average journey time: 12 hours, 50 minutes
- Service frequency: Daily
- Train number: 15, 18

On-board services
- Seating arrangements: Reserved coach
- Sleeping arrangements: Bedrooms and roomettes
- Catering facilities: Café

Technical
- Rolling stock: Heritage sleepers Amfleet coaches
- Track gauge: 4 ft 8 1/2 in (1,435 mm) standard gauge
- Track owner: SP

The Spirit of California was a passenger train operated by Amtrak between Los Angeles and Sacramento, California. It operated from 1981 to 1983 with financial support from the State of California. It was the first overnight service between the two cities since the Southern Pacific Railroad discontinued the Lark in 1968 and one of few state-supported Amtrak trains with sleeper service. The train used the Southern Pacific's Coast Line, complementing the Coast Starlight which served the route on a daytime schedule.

== History ==
The last overnight service on the Southern Pacific's Coast Line was the Lark, which ended on April 8, 1968. During the 1970s Amtrak operated the Coast Starlight, which departed Los Angeles every morning for Seattle, Washington. The southbound Coast Starlight arrived in the San Francisco Bay Area in the morning and in Los Angeles by dinnertime, and at the time did not serve Sacramento, the state capital.

The new train departed Los Angeles at 8:25 pm, arriving in Sacramento at 9:30 am the next morning. The southbound train departed at 7:55 pm and arrived at 9:00 am the next day. The California Department of Transportation, Caltrans, budgeted $1.7 million towards the train's first year of operation and expected 160,000 passengers the first year, rising to 300,000 in five years. The train carried coaches, a cafe, and two sleeping cars. Service began on October 25, 1981. Caltrans held a naming contest, with the winner "Spirit of California" announced on December 24. The name was chosen over the objection of Caltrans director Adriana Gianturco, who preferred The Nightingale.

Governor George Deukmejian cut funding for the train after taking office in January 1983. The train's supporters scrambled to find additional funding. A proposal to get funding from the state of Nevada in return for extending the train to Reno did not pass the Nevada legislature. The Spirit of California was discontinued in 1983, running for the final time on the night of September 30 – October 1, 1983.

== Equipment ==
The Spirit of California's usual consist was:

- EMD F40PH diesel locomotive
- Heritage baggage car
- Heritage sleeper
- Heritage sleeper
- Amfleet I café
- Amfleet I coach (60-seat)
- Amfleet I coach (60-seat)
