= Martinez Subdivision =

Union Pacific Railroad section from Roseville to the Bay Area, California

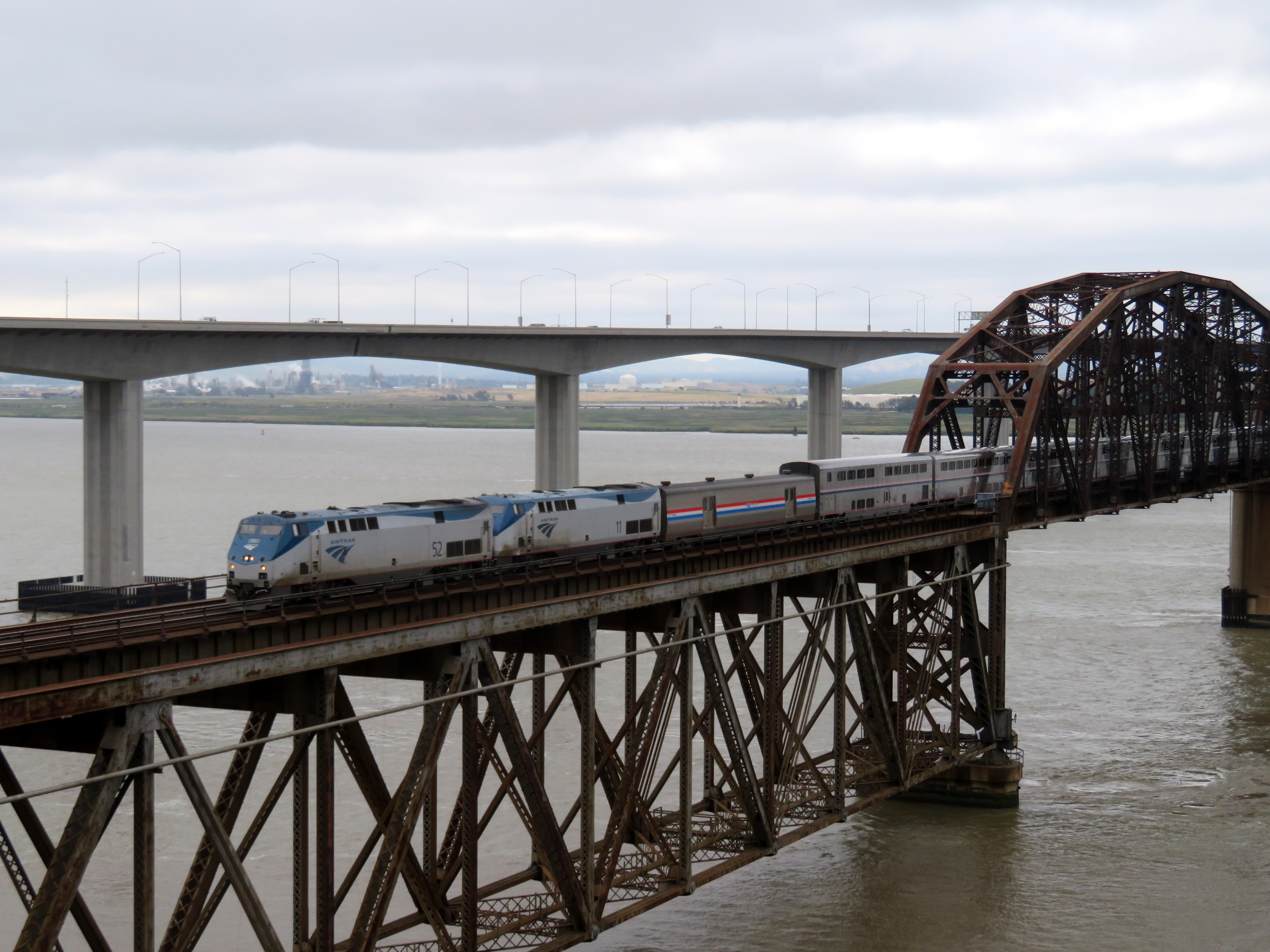
California Zephyr crossing the Benicia–Martinez Bridge over the Carquinez Strait, May 2019

The Martinez Subdivision is a Union Pacific railway line which runs from Roseville, California to Oakland, California. It is informally referred to as the Cal-P line, after the original California Pacific Railroad, who constructed the line from Sacramento to Suisun and Fairfield. (As such, the nickname may only apply to that segment.) The line is entirely double-tracked including bridges, and features extensive sidings.

== History ==
Originally built as a more direct route to the San Francisco Bay to compete with the Western Pacific Railroad, the Cal-P segment opened months prior to the First transcontinental railroad. California Pacific was taken over by the Central Pacific, which in late 1879 completed the line from Suisun-Fairfield to Oakland via the train ferry Solano from Benicia to Port Costa. The present double-track lift bridge across the Carquinez Strait replaced the train ferry in 1930.

The California Pacific became part of the Southern Pacific Railroad (SP) which in the 1990s merged into the Union Pacific Railroad, the line's current owner. The subdivision forms part of the modern Overland Route.

The Capitol Corridor Joint Powers Authority is planning to construct a third track between Sacramento and Roseville as part of a plan to expand passenger rail operations in the area.

== Traffic ==
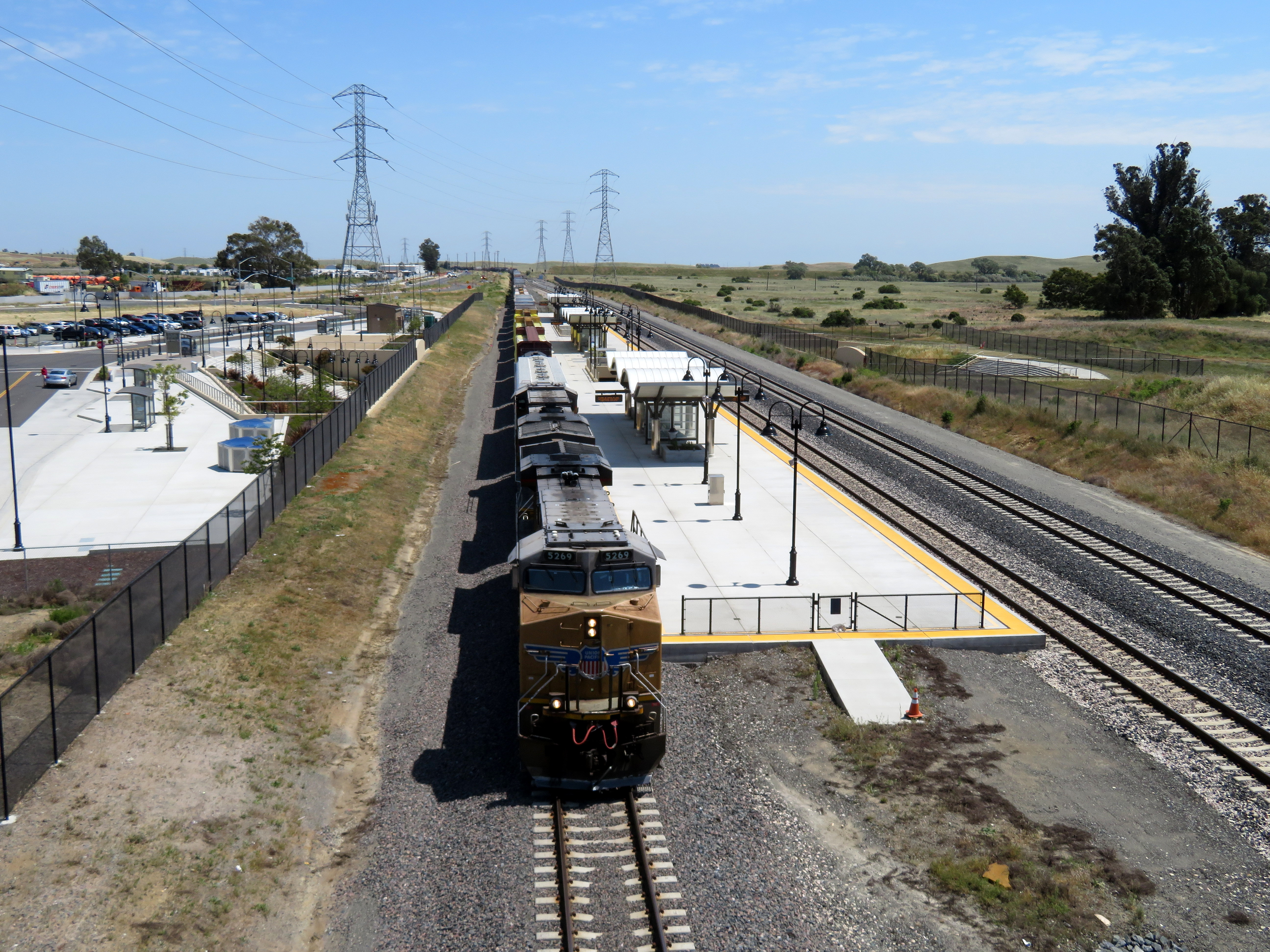
A Union Pacific freight train passes through Fairfield–Vacaville Amtrak station, May 2019

The line hosts several Amtrak passenger routes: the Capitol Corridor, Gold Runner, Coast Starlight, and California Zephyr operate 36 trains daily over the Benicia–Martinez Bridge. Union Pacific operates numerous freight trains over the route, and BNSF has trackage rights in some segments. As of 2003 the line between Martinez and Sacramento saw 44 freight trains daily.
