= Western Pacific Depot =

Railroad depot with street running tracks

Oakland
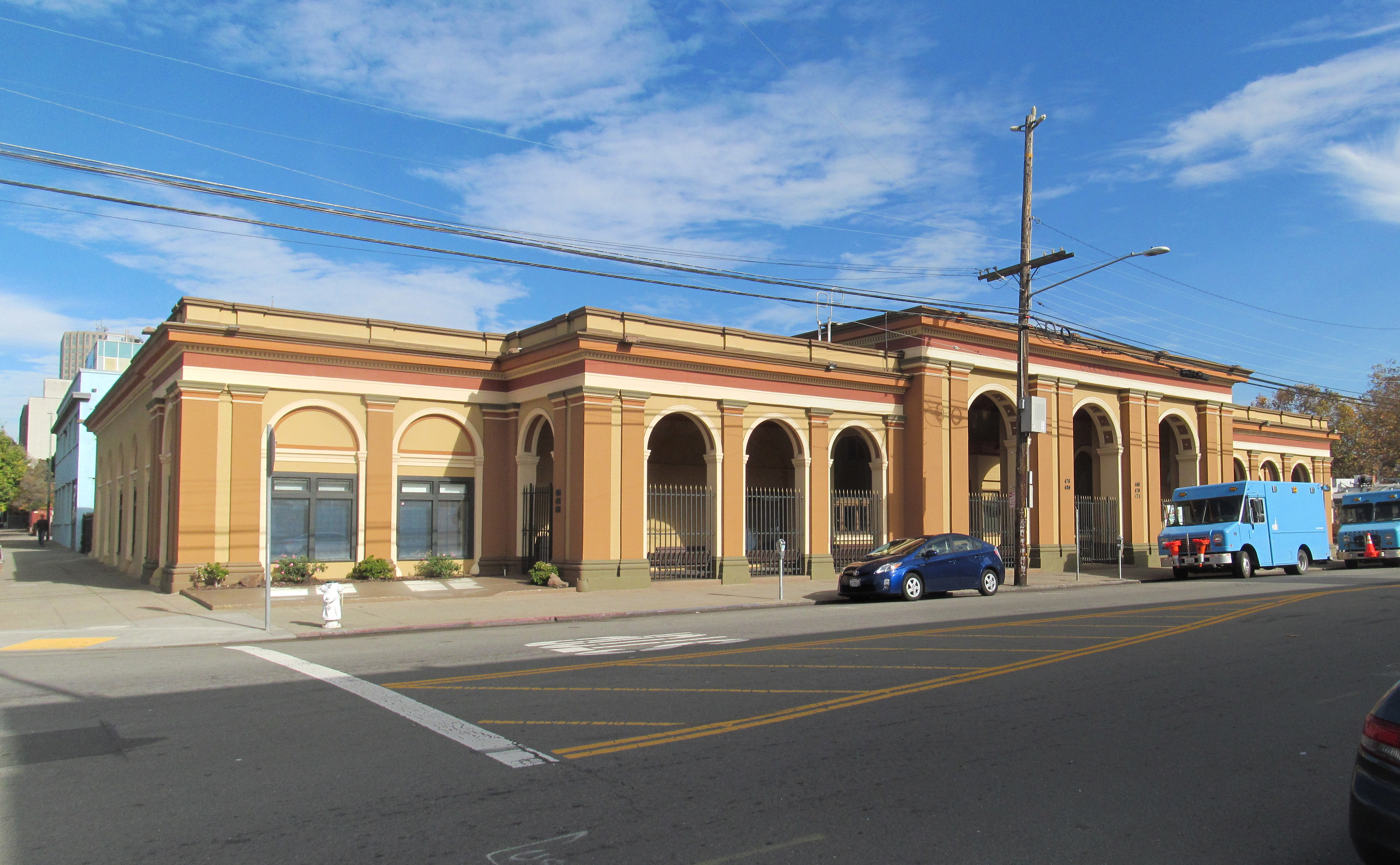
- The Depot in 2017

General information
- Location: 3rd Street and Washington Street; Oakland, California
- Coordinates: 37.7972°N 122.27666°W
- Platforms: none

History
- Opened: August 22, 1910
- Closed: March 22, 1970

Services
Preceding station	Western Pacific Railroad	Following station
Terminus	California Zephyr	Fremont toward Chicago
Oakland Pier (until 1958) Terminus	California Zephyr	Fremont toward Chicago
Terminus	Feather River Route	Fruitvale toward Salt Lake City
Western Pacific Mole (1910 to 1949) Terminus	Feather River Route	Fruitvale toward Salt Lake City

Oakland Designated Landmark
- Designated: 1974
- Reference no.: 1
Location

The Western Pacific Depot, also known as 3rd Street station, was a train station in Oakland, California. It opened in 1910 as the western terminus of the Western Pacific Railroad, located on 3rd Street with street running tracks at the corner of Washington Street. It was the last stop of the original California Zephyr, and earlier Exposition Flyer. The station closed in 1970 with the end of the service. The rails leading into the station were also removed with neighboring area redeveloped. The building was subsequently sold and converted to a restaurant and multiple other tenants since. In 1974, it was designated the first Oakland Designated Landmark.
