= Naperville train disaster =

1946 US passenger train crash

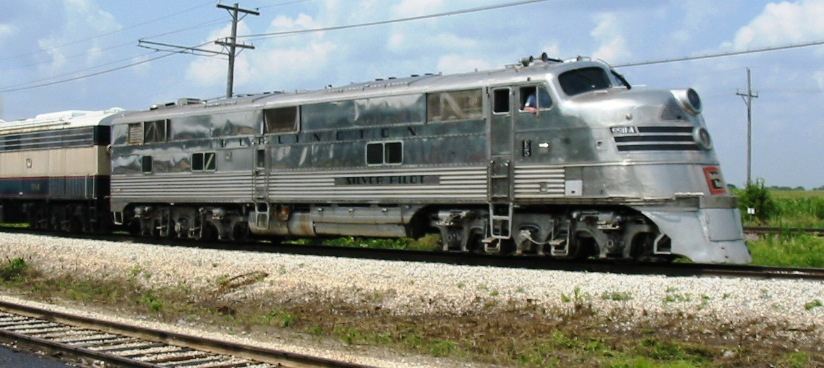
- C.B.&.Q. EMD E5 as used on the Exposition Flyer

Details
- Date: April 25, 1946; 80 years ago Approx. 1:02 PM
- Location: Naperville, Illinois
- Coordinates: 41°46′47″N 88°8′31″W
- Country: United States
- Line: Chicago Subdivision
- Operator: Chicago, Burlington and Quincy Railroad
- Incident type: Rear-end collision
- Cause: Signal passed at danger, Failure of second train to follow signal

Statistics
- Trains: Advance Flyer and Exposition Flyer
- Passengers: 150 (1st train); 175 (2nd train)
- Deaths: 45
- Injured: Approx. 125
- Damage: Diesel unit split rear passenger car; other cars dented and/or derailed

The Naperville train disaster occurred on April 25, 1946, on the Chicago, Burlington and Quincy Railroad at Loomis Street in Naperville, Illinois, when the railroad's Exposition Flyer rammed into the Advance Flyer, which had made an unscheduled stop to check its running gear. The Exposition Flyer had been coming through on the same track at 80 miles per hour (130 km/h). There were 45 deaths and some 125 injuries. This crash is a major reason why most passenger trains in the United States have a speed limit of 79 mph (127 km/h).

== Trains ==
Train consists
April 25, 1946
- Train: #11, Advance Exposition Flyer
- CB&Q E7 9920A diesel unit; CB&Q E7 9920B diesel unit; UP 1652 Baggage car; UP 2033 Mail storage car; SP 6520 Baggage-express car; CB&Q 1370 Baggage car; CB&Q 2326 Railway Post Office car; NYC 5963 Express refrigerator car; CB&Q 1583 Baggage car; CB&Q 1569 Baggage car; CB&Q 4703 Silver Gleam coach; CB&Q 4710 Silver Cloud coach; CB&Q 191 Silver Inn dining car; CB&Q Mississippi Buffet-lounge car; NP 1376 Coach
- Train: #39, Exposition Flyer
- CB&Q E5 diesel unit 9910A Silver Speed; CB&Q E5 diesel unit 9910B Silver Power; CB&Q 4500 Coach; D&RGW 961 Coach; D&RGW 971 Coach; C&BQ 172 Dining car; Pullman 4109 Tourist sleeping car; Pullman 1479 Tourist sleeping car; Poplar Branch Pullman sleeping car; Lake Baron Pullman sleeping car; Mt. Darwin Pullman sleeping-lounge car

The Advance Flyer and Exposition Flyer were diesel-powered high-speed inter-city passenger trains; the Exposition Flyer would be replaced by the famed California Zephyr within three years. Both trains were scheduled to leave Chicago's Union Station at 12:35 PM, the Advance Flyer took a two-minute lead as they both sped west. On the day of the wreck, the Advance Flyer had 2 EMD E7 units, 9920A and 9920B, with 8 head-end and 5 passenger cars. The Exposition Flyer had 2 EMD E5 units, 9910A and 9910B, with 9 passenger cars, four of which were sleepers. This was a short train for the run; normally 12 to 16 cars were needed.

== Setting ==
Naperville is a suburb in DuPage County, Illinois, 28 miles (45 km) west of Union Station along the CB&Q's main line from Chicago to Aurora. This well-maintained three-track line, nicknamed "the Racetrack" by locals, had heavy traffic. The outside tracks typically had freight and local commuter trains running in one direction only on each. The center track, signaled in both directions, was used by intercity and express commuter passenger trains. The Flyers normally ran through Naperville on the center track at 80 miles per hour (130 km/h).

== Wreck ==
Just after 1 p.m. on April 25, 1946, the rear brakeman signaled for the Advance Flyer to stop after he saw something fly out from under the train. It stopped at Loomis Street in Naperville, just beyond a gradual curve that trains came through at speed. A flagman had just started to back up the tracks when the Exposition Flyer loomed into view.

According to engineer W. W. Blaine of the Exposition Flyer, he immediately applied brakes upon seeing Signal 227.1, showing Approach (yellow), but it was still too close to the first train to stop in time. The Exposition Flyer, slowing from 80 mph (130 km/h), was still traveling over 45 mph (72 km/h) when it struck the rear of the Advance Flyer. Signal 227.1 was 6,551 feet (1,997 m) from the point of impact. Subsequent braking tests with a train composed of the same equipment showed that if the brakes were applied at Signal 227.1 with the train travelling at 81 mph, the train should have stopped 395 feet (120 m) before the next signal (Signal 228.1) and 1,329 feet (405 m) from the point of impact. Applying the brake in emergency at 86 mph (138 km/h) at the point that Signal 228.1 (at Stop and Proceed, protecting the stopped Advance Flyer) came into view resulted in a stop 393 feet (120 m) feet beyond the point of impact. Tests on the components of the braking system of the wrecked train after the accident showed that they were operating normally.

When the locomotive hit the last car (#13) of the Advance Flyer, a 68-seat heavyweight coach, the locomotive's front truck detached and the body plowed through three fourths of the length of the car, killing most of its passengers. The locomotive continued for a total of 205 feet (62 m) beyond the point of impact. Car #12, a heavyweight observation car, remained intact and pushed forward into car #11, a lightweight diner. The only car on either train not built to the then-current strength standards, it collapsed into a U-shape, with multiple deaths. Lightweight 52-seat chair car #10 tipped on its side. #9 derailed and was leaning. None of the head-end cars derailed or were damaged.

The Exposition Flyer's locomotives were badly damaged, the all-heavyweight train less so. Cars #1 to #5 all derailed, but the only damage was between cars #2 and #3; the front vestibule of #3 was collapsed about 6 feet (1.8 m).

== Rescue ==
The Kroehler Furniture company was next to the crash scene; hundreds of employees rushed to help, and an aid station was set up in their warehouse. Fifty North Central College students and countless local residents also helped. Emergency workers came from as far as Hinsdale, more than 10 miles (16 km) away. Most of the wounded were brought to hospitals in Aurora; bodies were taken to local funeral homes. Engineer Blaine of the Exposition Flyer, who stayed at his station, climbed out of the wreckage and made his way unassisted to an aid station, despite a head wound and fractured skull. The fireman, who jumped before the impact, was the only person on the Exposition Flyer who died.

The railroad sent a special relief train with doctors and nurses. By late night all injured and most bodies had been recovered. All three mainline tracks were blocked by wreckage. It was 27 hours before trains started to slowly move through the crash site and three days before all wreckage was cleared.

== Aftermath ==
There were four investigations of the wreck. In the first, a DuPage County Coroner's inquest recommended that manslaughter charges be filed against the engineer of the Exposition Flyer. He was charged but not taken into custody, as he was in the hospital at the time. He would not recover enough to be directly questioned in any of the investigations.

The CB&Q's investigation started on April 28, three days after the wreck. Brake tests showed that the wreck could have been avoided, or less serious, if the engineer had followed the rules, but the overall objectivity of the investigation was questioned. DuPage County District Attorney Lee Daniels said the railroad was "rehearsing the evidence". It was suspended for the grand jury's investigation.

An Interstate Commerce Commission report dated July 30, 1946, made recommendations that would affect railroads across the country. It also compared older heavyweight cars to newer lightweight ones (the Advance Flyer had a mixed consist).

In October a DuPage County grand jury found that though the railroad and some employees were negligent, no single act caused the wreck. Rather, the accident resulted from a combination of many factors. No indictments were made, and charges against the Exposition Flyer's engineer were dropped.

The engineer of the Exposition Flyer was the center of all the investigations. He said he was going too fast. The railroad said the signals were functioning correctly. Questions were raised about braking. The engineer said he had put the brakes in "emergency", and witnesses reported the wheels were sparking, but physical evidence did not support that and crewmembers felt that the train was only in "service" braking before the impact.

There were questions about the conductor of the Advance Flyer stopping the train just beyond the curve, and whether the flagman did his job effectively.

The railroad scheduling fast trains so close together was a problem, as was the mixing of lightweight and heavyweight cars, and the order of the cars.

As for the equipment involved, the rear end passenger car was most likely scrapped, due to being split in half. Other damaged passenger cars were repaired, but heavy weight cars were no longer combined with light weight cars after the wreck. The two leading units of the Exposition Flyer, 9910A and 9910B, were badly damaged but not beyond repair; they did run into the end of the decade. Neither unit survived the scrapper's torch after the CB&Q merged into the Burlington Northern in 1970. The leading units of the Advance Flyer were almost certainly scrapped as there is only one surviving E7 unit, which is an example from the Pennsylvania Railroad, not the CB&Q, and is the sole survivor of the EMD E7 series.

== Long-term results ==
This crash is a major reason why most passenger trains in the United States have a speed limit of 79 mph (127 km/h). The CB&Q, Milwaukee Road, and Illinois Central were among railroads in the region running passenger trains up to and above 100 miles per hour (160 km/h) in the 1930s and 1940s. The Interstate Commerce Commission ruled in 1951 that trains traveling 80 mph or more must have "an automatic cab signal, automatic train stop or automatic train control system", expensive technology that was implemented on some lines in the region but which has since been mostly removed.

The Burlington increased headway on the two trains from 2 minutes to 15 minutes in May and added a signal aspect, flashing yellow (conditional approach), for a total of four aspects. They continued to haul mixed heavyweight/lightweight trains, but the railroad was already replacing heavyweight cars with stainless steel lightweight "Zephyr" type cars. All units in both trains would return to service except the Advance Flyer's last coach and the dining car; both were total losses.

Following this disaster, advancements in train speed in the United States essentially halted. However, select Amtrak passenger trains run at up to 160 mph (260 km/h) as of 2026.

In 2012 Chuck Spinner published The Tragedy at the Loomis Street Crossing. Because of the interest generated by the book, a Naperville committee selected Paul Kuhn to create a sculpture at the crash site. The sculpture, commemorating both the victims and the rescue workers involved in the tragic wreck, was dedicated in 2014. Kuhn's sculpture is made of 5,000 railroad spikes.
