= California Zephyr (1949–1970) =

Passenger train operated from 1949 to 1970 in the U.S.

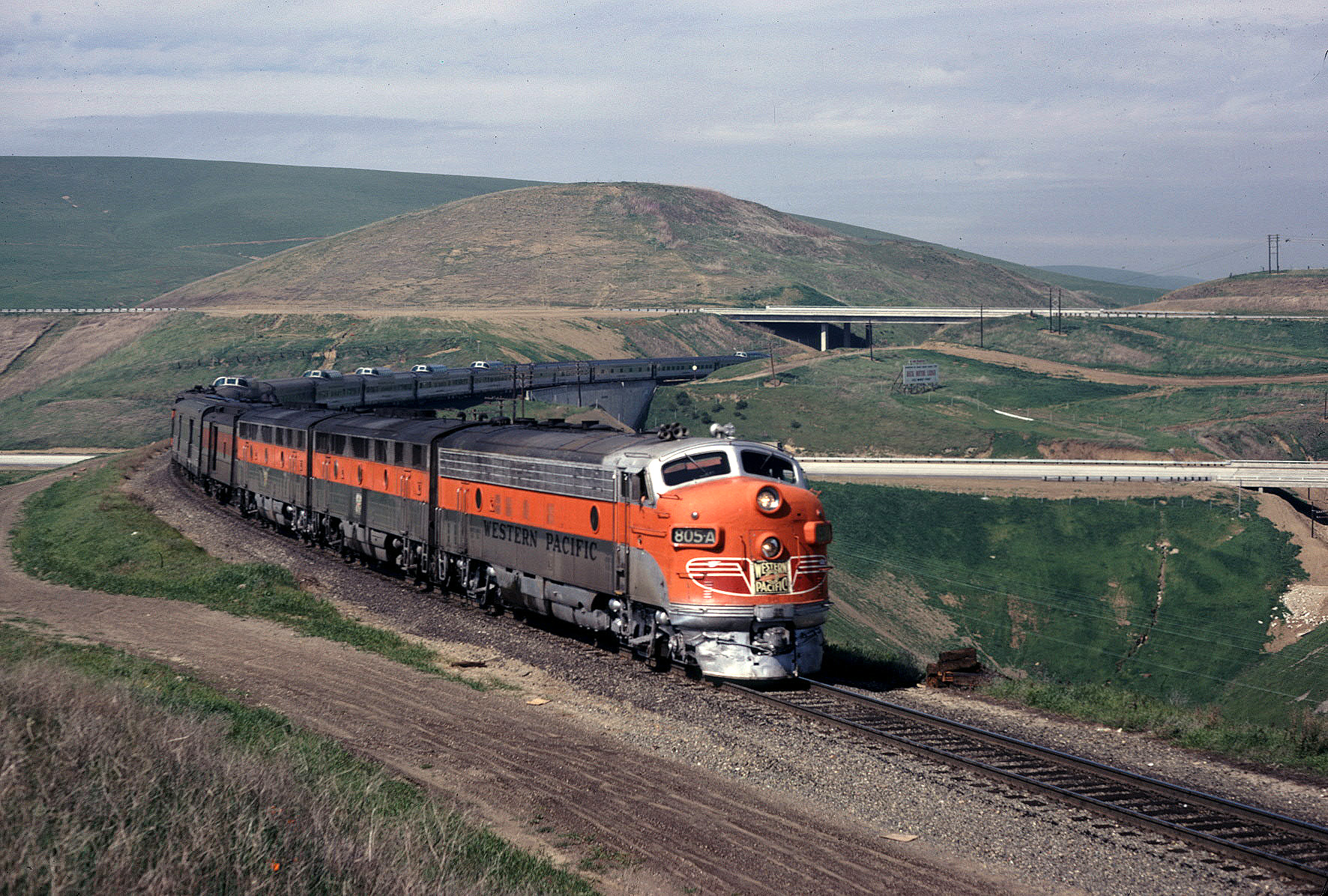
- The California Zephyr on the Altamont Pass in 1970

Overview
- Service type: Inter-city rail
- Locale: Western United States
- Predecessor: Exposition Flyer
- First service: March 20, 1949
- Last service: March 22, 1970
- Successor: Rio Grande Zephyr
- Former operators: Chicago, Burlington and Quincy Railroad; Burlington Northern Railroad (during March 1970); Denver and Rio Grande Western Railroad; Western Pacific Railroad

Route
- Termini: Chicago, Illinois; Oakland, California: Oakland Mole/Oakland Long Wharf (to 1958); Western Pacific Depot (after 1958)
- Stops: 33
- Distance travelled: 2,433 miles (3,916 km) (1954, Oakland Mole)
- Average journey time: 48 1/4 hours (1954, Oakland Mole)
- Service frequency: Daily

Technical
- Track gauge: 1,435 mm (4 ft 8 1/2 in)

The California Zephyr was a passenger train that ran between Chicago, Illinois, and Oakland, California, via Omaha, Denver, Salt Lake City, Winnemucca, Oroville and Pleasanton in the United States. It was operated by the Chicago, Burlington & Quincy (CB&Q), Denver & Rio Grande Western (D&RGW) and Western Pacific (WP) railroads, all of which dubbed it "the most talked about train in America" on March 19, 1949, with the first departure the following day. The train was scheduled to pass through the most spectacular scenery on its route in the daylight. The original train ceased operation in 1970, though the D&RGW continued to operate its own passenger service, the Rio Grande Zephyr, between Salt Lake City and Denver, using the original equipment until 1983. In 1983 a second iteration of the California Zephyr, an Amtrak service, was formed. The current version of the California Zephyr operates partially over the route of the original Zephyr and partially over the route of its former rival, the City of San Francisco.

== History ==
=== Pre-California Zephyr (1939 to 1949) ===
In 1939, the Golden Gate International Exposition opened on Treasure Island in San Francisco Bay. The CB&Q, D&RGW and WP decided to operate a train that could take passengers to the event. Service on the Exposition Flyer began on June 10, 1939. In the beginning, the train used steam locomotives as motive power and consisted of heavyweight Pullman standard cars. In later years, the train used diesel power and in the final months of service used streamlined passenger cars. Initially, the service was to be temporary, but its popularity made it a significant rival to the City of San Francisco, the Chicago-Oakland train operated jointly by the Chicago & North Western, Union Pacific and Southern Pacific, and it remained in operation until 1949. The CB&Q, D&RGW and Western Pacific replaced the Exposition Flyer in 1949 with the all-streamlined California Zephyr, which used the same route.

=== California Zephyr ===
In its original run, the California Zephyr operated over the Chicago, Burlington and Quincy Railroad (Burlington Route) from Chicago to Denver, Colorado, the Denver and Rio Grande Western Railroad between Denver and Salt Lake City, Utah, and the Western Pacific Railroad from Salt Lake City to Oakland, California. Cars owned by different railroads ran together; cars cycled in and out for service, repairs, and varying passenger loads with the seasons.

The first train was named in San Francisco by Eleanor Parker, but the WP entered it in the same way that others entered New York City: by ferry, and not by rail. California Lieutenant Governor Goodwin Knight, mayor of San Francisco Elmer Robinson, and WP President Harry A. Mitchell looked on. For the inaugural run in 1949, every woman on the train was given silver and orange orchids flown from Hilo, Hawaii. The car hostesses were known as Zephyrettes.

In May 1954, the scheduled run for the 2,537 miles from Chicago to San Francisco was 50 hours and 50 minutes. An eastbound California Zephyr through Ruby Canyon saw the train's first birth on March 1, 1955, when Reed Zars was born on board.

Knowing that they could not begin to compete with the faster and less-rugged route used by the City of San Francisco, the Burlington Route, Rio Grande and Western Pacific billed the California Zephyr as a scenic "rail cruise" through the Rockies.

Route portions:

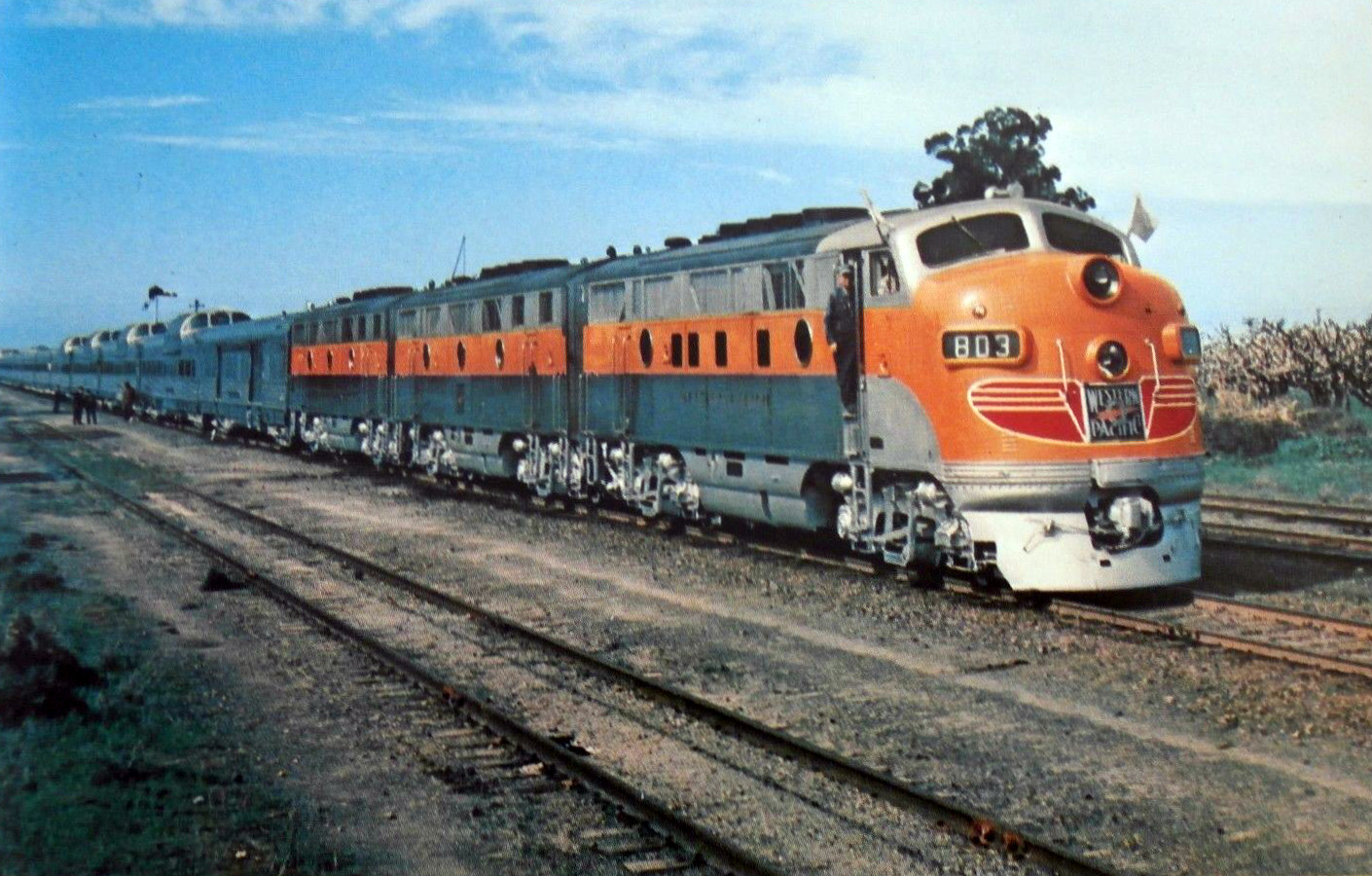
The Western Pacific operated the western portion of the route between Oakland and Salt Lake City. This image shows the train in Altamont, California, prior to the train's first run in 1949.

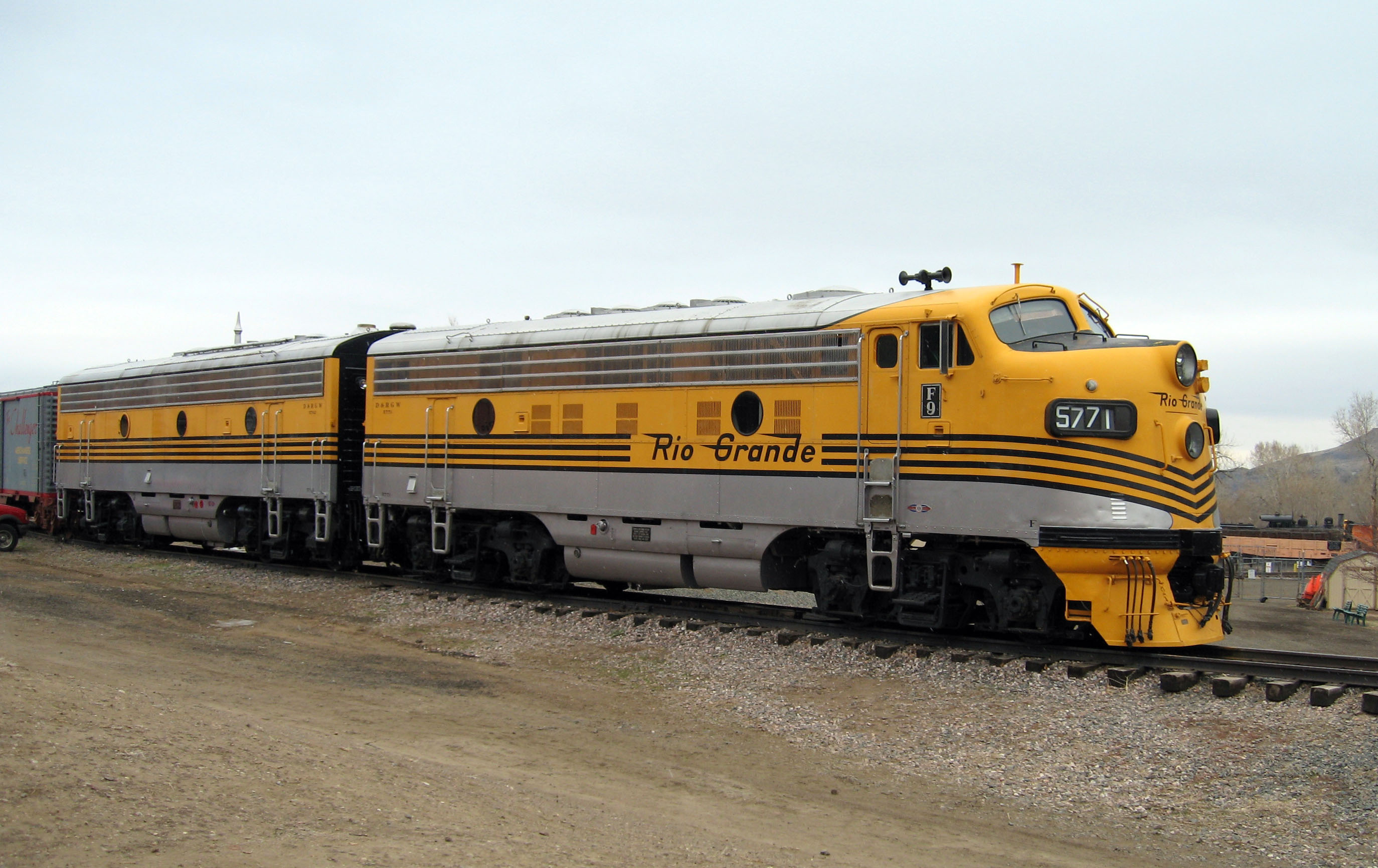
The Rio Grande operated the middle portion of the route between Salt Lake City and Denver. This image shows locomotive #5771, which began operating the California Zephyr route in 1955, and would later operate on the subsequent Rio Grande Zephyr, as it sits restored at the Colorado Railroad Museum.

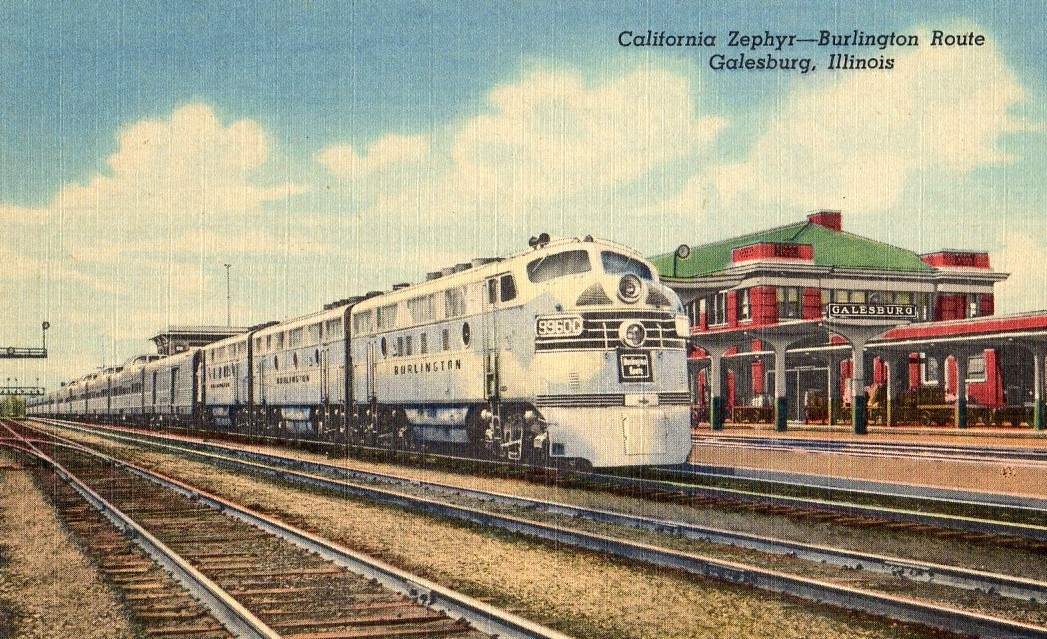
The Burlington Route operated the eastern portion of the route, between Denver and Chicago. This postcard from the early 1950s shows the train passing Galesburg, Illinois.

=== Zephyrettes ===
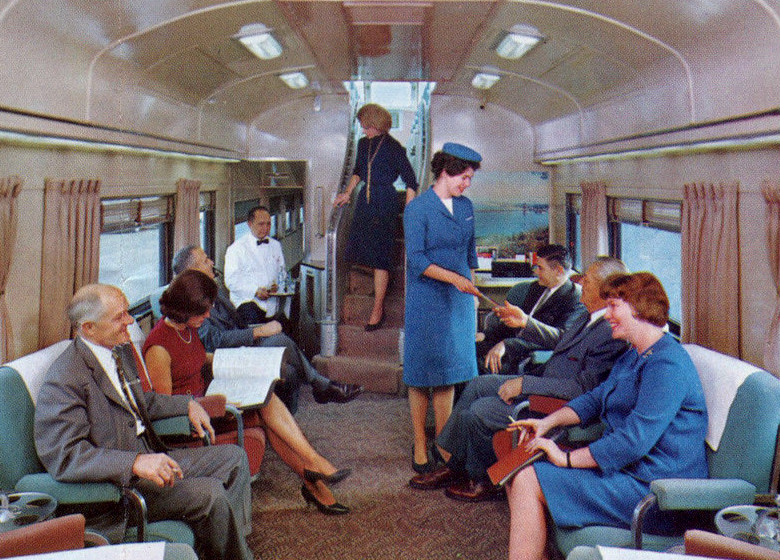
A Zephyrette (center, in blue uniform) at work on the lower level of a California Zephyr Vista-Dome car in 1967

The brainchild of Velma McPeek, the Burlington's Supervisor of Passenger Train Services, the Zephyrettes were train hostesses who performed a wide variety of roles, from tour guide to first-aid responder to babysitter. After debuting on the Denver Zephyr in 1936, they served on the California Zephyr from 1949 until it was discontinued in 1970. Described by former Zephyrette Julie Ann Lyman as "the railroad's answer to the air line stewardess", the various duties of the position included welcoming passengers, making announcements, sending telegrams, making dinner reservations, and generally serving as a liaison between the train's passengers and its crew. At any one time, there were 10 or 11 Zephyrettes who were actively employed. When Amtrak revived the California Zephyr in 1983, it invited a former Zephyrette, Beulah Bauman, to christen the train.

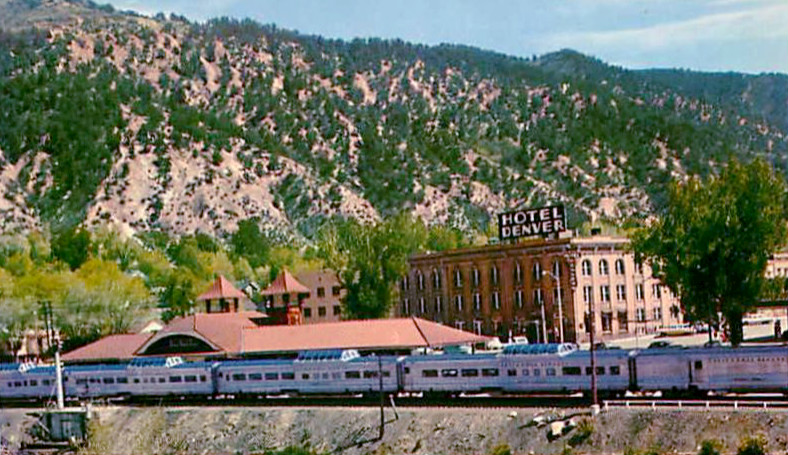
The California Zephyr stopping at the resort town of Glenwood Springs, Colorado, before 1965

A pair of the Western Pacific's Budd Rail Diesel Cars (RDCs), replacements for the Royal Gorge (trains No. 1 and 2), also used the name Zephyrette. From September 15, 1950, to October 2, 1960, they were in service between Oakland, California, and Salt Lake City, a distance of 924 miles (1,487 km), which made the route the longest RDC service in the United States.

=== Discontinued ferry connection ===
The last portion of route using the bay ferries ended in 1958 and replaced by bus service.

The opening of the San Francisco–Oakland Bay Bridge and San Francisco Transbay Terminal in 1930s offered alternative rail connections directly into San Francisco until the 1950s. Declining rail ridership prompted ending rail connection and even the Transbay Terminal became a bus depot.

=== Decline and replacement ===
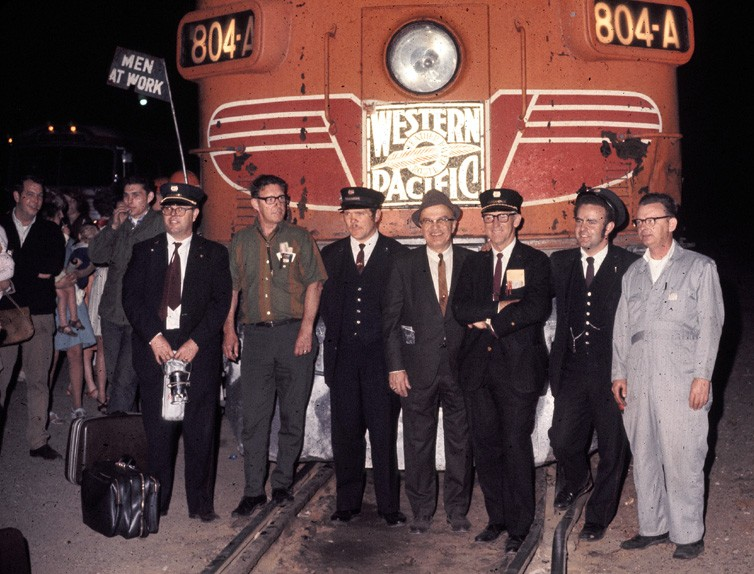
The crew of the last California Zephyr upon its arrival in Oakland in 1970

The California Zephyr was not immune to falling passenger travel in the 1960s; moreover, it began to lose money even when sold out. The Western Pacific applied to discontinue its portion in 1966, but the Interstate Commerce Commission (ICC) refused after public outcry. The D&RGW made the same request in 1969 and in 1970 the ICC permitted Western Pacific to end its portion, provided the D&RGW and Burlington Northern Railroad provide "some semblance of [service]" between Chicago and Ogden, Utah. The last westbound California Zephyr to the west coast left Chicago on March 22, 1970, and arrived in Oakland two days later. The original California Zephyr had operated for 21 years and 2 days. East of Salt Lake City the train was reduced to a tri-weekly schedule, operating as California Service on the Burlington Northern and as the Rio Grande Zephyr on the Rio Grande. The Rio Grande portion of the train was extended beyond Salt Lake to Ogden, Utah, allowing Nevada and California passengers to connect to the Southern Pacific Railroad's City of San Francisco. This continued until the creation of Amtrak on May 1, 1971.

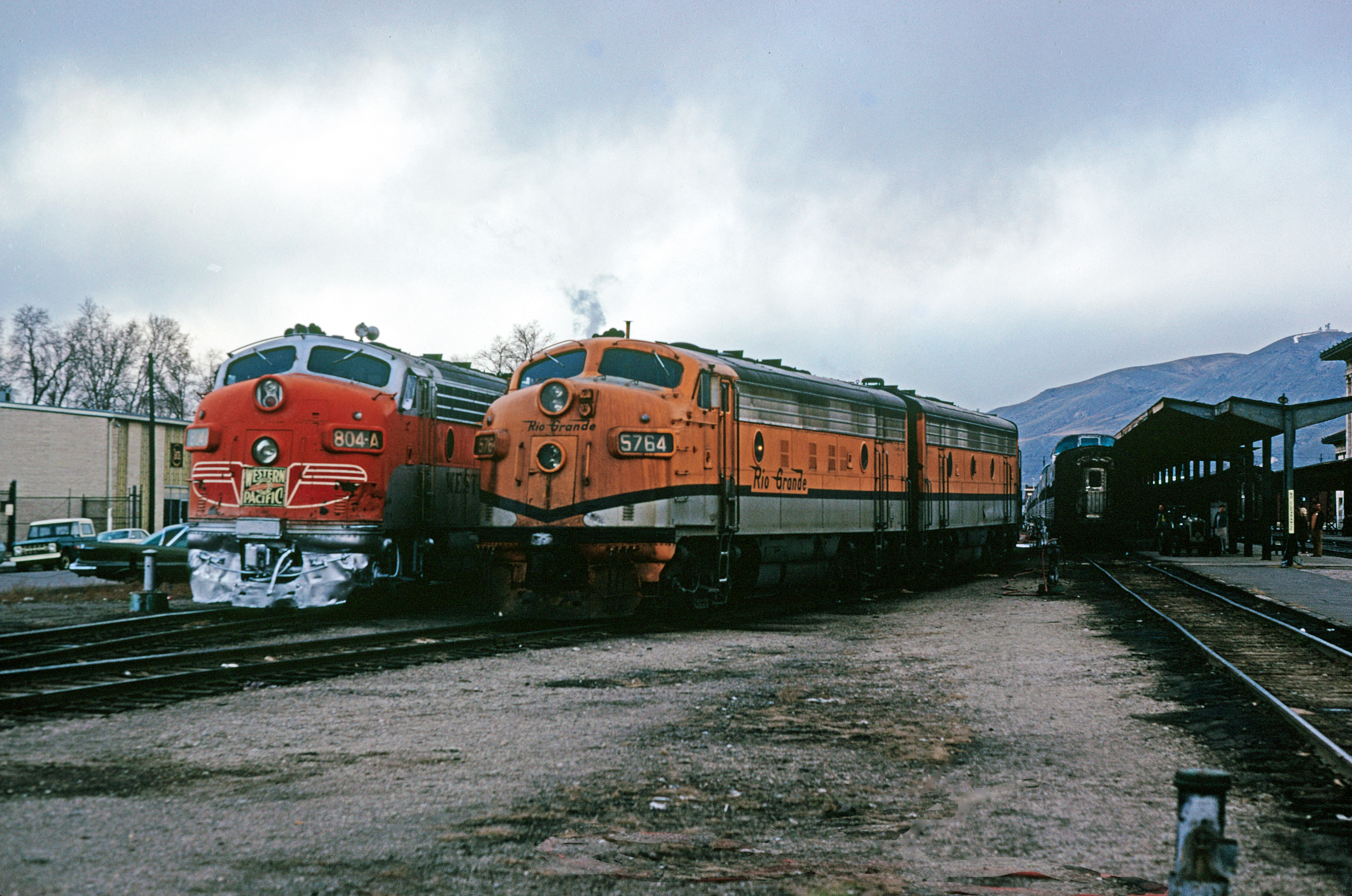
1970 California Zephyr switches between Rio Grande and Western Pacific locomotives in Salt Lake City

Amtrak intended to revive the California Zephyr as part its original route network in 1971, using the Burlington Northern east of Denver, the Rio Grande between Denver and Ogden, and the Southern Pacific west of Ogden, Utah. At the last minute, the Rio Grande refused to join Amtrak, fearing the new company's passenger trains would interfere with profitable freight traffic. This forced Amtrak to use the Union Pacific's Overland Route through southern Wyoming instead of going across Colorado. Between the spring of 1971 and the summer of 1972, passengers traveling between Chicago and Oakland would have to travel on two different trains: the Denver Zephyr, which operated daily between Chicago and Denver, and the City of San Francisco, which operated three times a week between Denver and the San Francisco Bay Area. Eventually, however, after several false starts, Amtrak consolidated the two trains into one, dubbed the San Francisco Zephyr in homage to both the California Zephyr and the San Francisco Chief between Chicago and Oakland. The Rio Grande continued to operate the Rio Grande Zephyr between Denver and Ogden.

In 1983 the D&RGW elected to join Amtrak, citing increasing losses in passenger operations. Amtrak re-routed the San Francisco Zephyr over the D&RGW's Moffat Subdivision between Denver and Salt Lake City, its original preference from 1971. The change was scheduled for April 25, but a mudslide at Thistle, Utah, closed the line and delayed the change until July 16. With the change of route, Amtrak renamed the train as the California Zephyr. The modern California Zephyr uses mostly the same route as the original east of Winnemucca, Nevada. The train uses the route of the former City of San Francisco, along the Overland Route (First transcontinental railroad), between Elko, Nevada, and Sacramento. Across central Nevada, the two rail lines have been combined under owner Union Pacific to use directional running. As such, the exact spot the train switches lines depend on the direction of travel.

== Route description ==
Both the current and original iterations of the California Zephyr operate on Chicago, Burlington and Quincy (today part of BNSF Railway) between Chicago and Denver, and the former Denver and Rio Grande Western main line from Denver to Salt Lake City, following the famous Moffat Tunnel Route until the Dotsero cutoff. (Today part of Union Pacific Railroad's Central Corridor). West of Salt Lake City both iterations departed Salt Lake on the Shafter Subdivision of the former Western Pacific Railroad and crossed much of Nevada using the Elko Subdivision.

The routes of the two iterations of the California Zephyr diverge at the rail junction of Weso, Nevada (near Winnemucca). The current iteration uses the Overland Route from this point west, the route used by the City of San Francisco. The original California Zephyr used the Feather River Route as its path through the Sierra Nevada. Instead of passing through Reno, the original Zephyr was routed via Gerlach, Nevada, and in California passed through Portola, Oroville, Sacramento, Stockton and Pleasanton before arriving at the Oakland depot. The Feather River Route is still in use for freight; however, no longer hosts a regularly scheduled passenger service. This portion of the route mostly parallels State Route 70.

The Oakland terminal was originally the Southern Pacific Mole, where a ferry service was available to San Francisco. After July 1958, trains terminated at the Western Pacific Depot.

== Equipment ==
Inaugural 1949 consist
- Baggage; Vista-Dome chair car (Line CZ22); Vista-Dome chair car (Line CZ21); Vista-Dome chair car (Line CZ20); Vista-Dome dormitory-buffet-lounge car; Sleeper (10 roomettes, 6 double bedrooms) (Line CZ15); Sleeper (10 roomettes, 6 double bedrooms) (Line CZ14); Diner (48 seats); Sleeper (16 sections) (Line CZ12); Sleeper (10 roomettes, 6 double bedrooms) (Line CZ11 to New York); Vista-Dome dormitory-buffet-lounge-observation (1 drawing room, 3 double bedrooms) (Line CZ10)

The Budd Company manufactured six ten-car trainsets; three went to the Burlington, two to the Western Pacific and one to the Rio Grande. In line with the train's sightseeing schedule, each set included five of the new "Vista-Domes" (three coaches, a dormitory-lounge, and a sleeper-observation car). The California Zephyr was the first long-distance train to carry domes in regular service. In addition, each consist included a baggage car, a dining car, a 16-section sleeping car and three 10-roomette 6-double bedroom sleeping cars. The Pennsylvania Railroad owned a single 10-roomette 6-double bedroom sleeping car, the Silver Rapids, which was used for through service to New York City.

Each car was named: all names began with "Silver…" with each type of car having a different theme; the baggage cars were named after animals, the dome coaches had a western theme, the lounge and dining cars had a catering theme, the 16-section cars were named after trees, the 10-6 cars carried names associated with the suffixes used for types of Pullman sleeping cars, while the observation cars' names emphasized their domes.

The forward section of the first Vista-Dome car was partitioned off and reserved for women and children. A door was located in the corridor under the dome just behind the women's restroom to allow access to the reserved section. Early on, this reserved section was opened up to all passengers and the door and partitions were removed. Ownership of the cars was split between the three railroads almost evenly across all car types. Each car was owned by one railroad, but the ownership of the cars in any one day's train depended more on what was available at the terminals than whose railroad the train was operating over.

Generally positioned as the second Vista-Dome coach was the car referred to as the "Conductor's Car". This car was like the other Vista-Dome coaches, except a small booth with a bench seat and desk for the conductor was located in the B end.

In 1952 another type of Pullman sleeper (6-double bedrooms 5-compartments) was added to each consist; they ran as the leading sleeping car as line CZ16 and carried the names of birds as their "Silver…" theme. In addition, the Burlington bought another observation car, another 16-section car, and two 10-6 cars. With the new cars delivered that year, cars arriving in Chicago on the California Zephyr were made available for use on the Ak-Sar-Ben Zephyr for an overnight round trip to Lincoln, Nebraska. When the cars returned from Lincoln the next day, they were placed back in the westbound California Zephyr's consist for the next train out of Chicago that afternoon.

The Pennsylvania Railroad's transcontinental sleeping car to and from New York was eliminated in October 1957, owing to declining ridership.

During the winter 1963–1964 season, all seven 16-section cars were withdrawn and rebuilt as 48-seat (non-dome) coaches. They went back into service carrying the same names and were placed between the baggage car and the dome coaches as line CZ23. The Burlington renumbered their cars but the Rio Grande and Western Pacific retained the existing fleet numbers on their cars.

=== Preservation ===
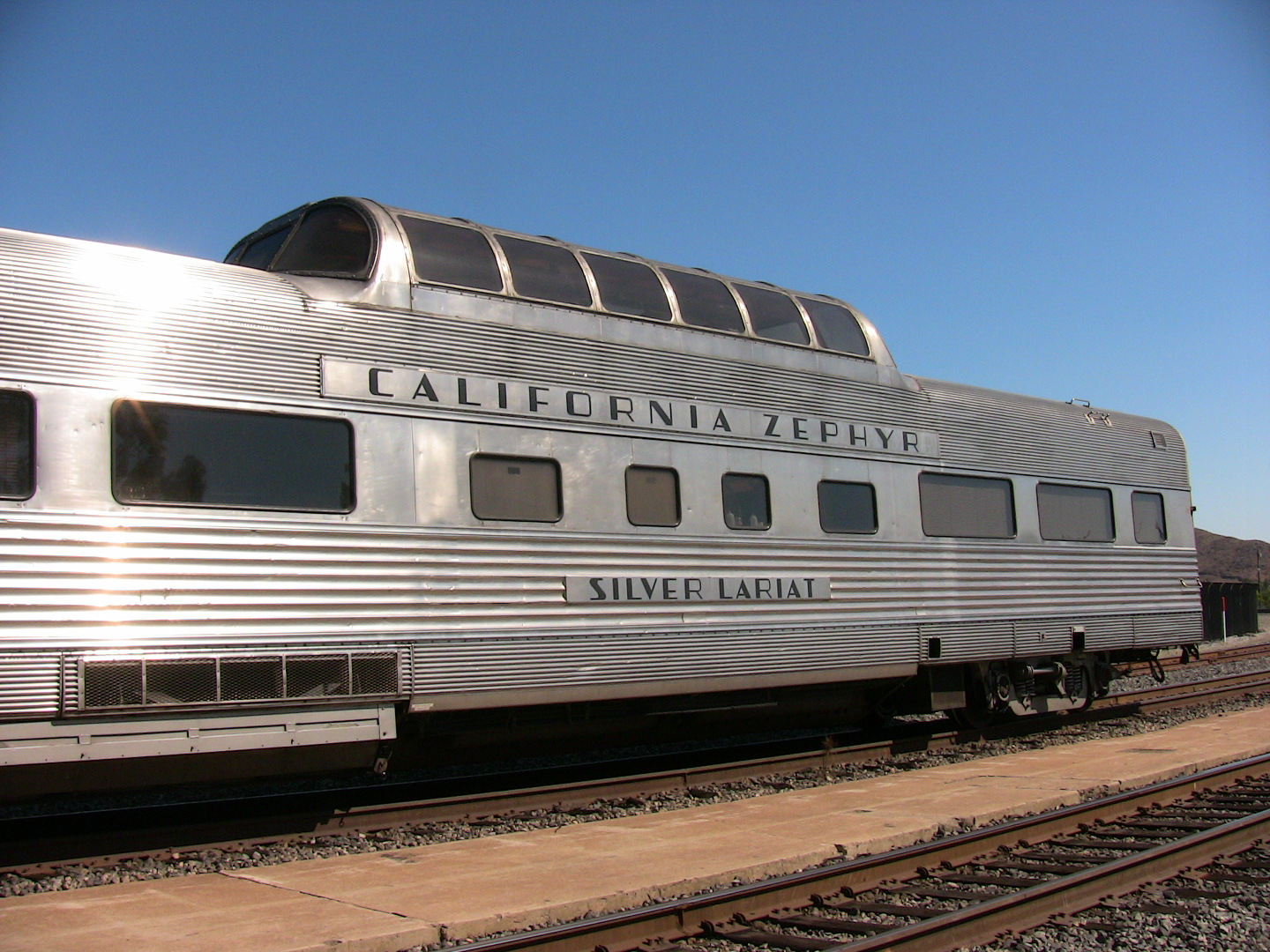
The former California Zephyr dome coach Silver Lariat en route to Oakland on the Coast Starlight at San Luis Obispo

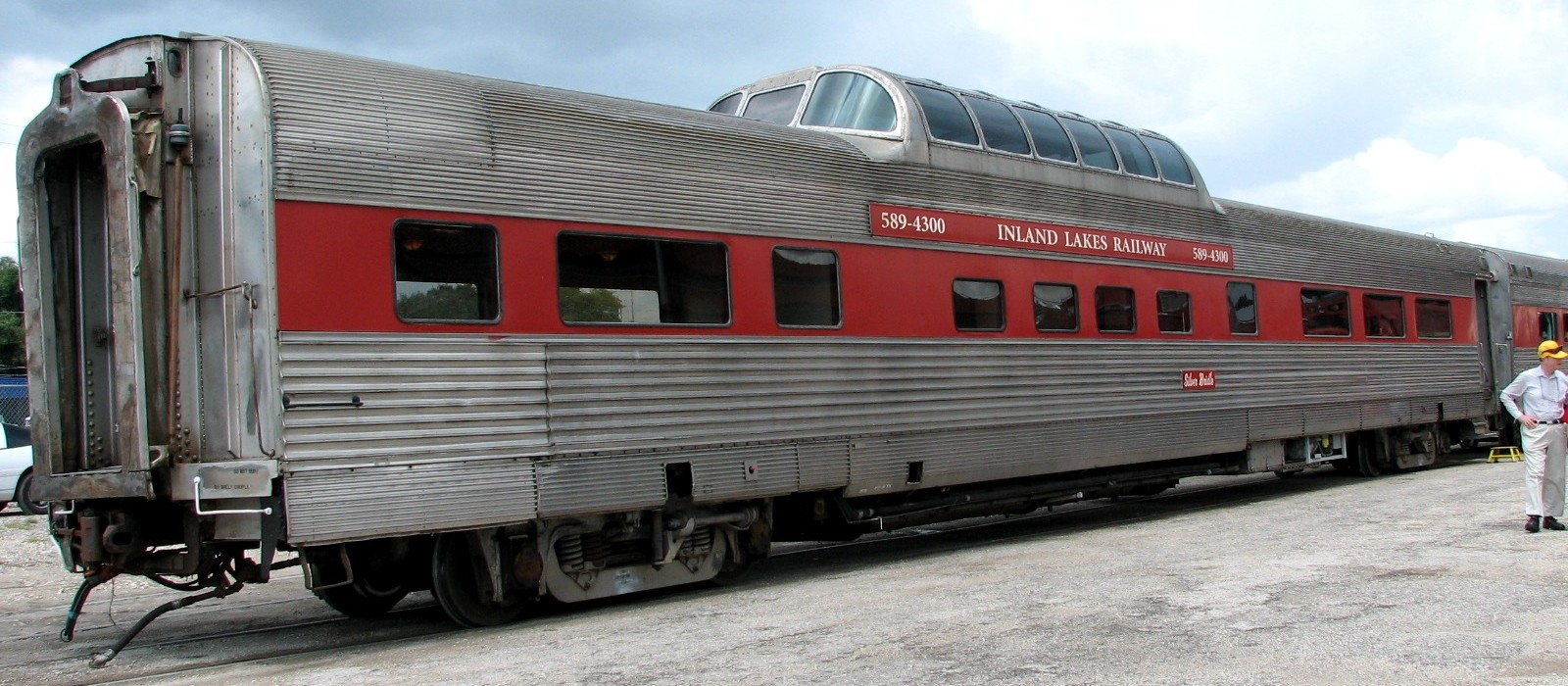
The former California Zephyr dome coach Silver Bridle in service with the Inland Lakes Railway at Plymouth, Florida

The high-quality Budd-built cars of the California Zephyr have proven to be popular with private car owners. Several operate in private charter service on Amtrak, including dome-observation car Silver Solarium, dome-coach Silver Lariat, sleepers Silver Rapids and Silver Quail and a dome lounge now known as the Sierra Hotel. In 2018, the Silver Lariat, Silver Solarium, Silver Rapids and the baggage car Silver Peak were sold to the Cuyahoga Valley Scenic Railroad outside Cleveland, Ohio and entered service there in September 2018.

Seven museums currently hold equipment once used on the California Zephyr:

- The largest collection of preserved equipment can be found in Portola, California, at the Western Pacific Railroad Museum. One locomotive and four cars are currently preserved there as part of the museum's "Zephyr Project" restoration program. Western Pacific 805-A is the last intact locomotive built specifically for the California Zephyr. The cars include dome-lounge Silver Hostel, dome coaches Silver Lodge and Silver Rifle (on long-term loan from the Golden Gate Railroad Museum) and the diner Silver Plate.
- The Heart of Dixie Railroad Museum in Calera, Alabama, owns the Silver Maple (ex-CB&Q 400 [sleeper], rebuilt 1963 to chair car configuration, CB&Q 4742) now numbered 4741. The Silver Maple is used in regular excursion service.
- The Illinois Railway Museum owns several Burlington locomotives that were used to pull the train on occasion, Rio Grande dome coach Silver Pony, and WP baggage car Silver Beaver.
- The Colorado Railroad Museum has two Rio Grande locomotives that also saw California Zephyr and later Rio Grande Zephyr service.
- The Gold Coast Railroad Museum in Florida owns two former Western Pacific Railroad California Zephyr cars: baggage car Silver Stag and dome-observation car Silver Crescent.
- The Avon Park Depot Museum in Florida owns one former Western Pacific California Zephyr car: the Silver Palm, originally a sleeper car, is now a buffet dining car used by the museum for dinner parties. The car was converted to its buffet car state by the Auto-Train Corporation when it bought the car.
- The Austin Steam Train Association, which operates the Austin & Texas Central Railroad in the Hill Country between Cedar Park and Burnet, has completed its restoration of the Silver Pine. Originally a 16-section sleeper manufactured in 1948 by the Budd Company, the coach car re-entered revenue service in 2011 for the first time since its Denver & Rio Grande Western days.

Three diner cars were in revenue service with Amtrak as of 2015, but are now retired.

==== Replicas ====
A non-functional replica of the California Zephyr was displayed at Disney California Adventure Park in Anaheim, California. It housed Baker's Field Bakery and Bur-r-r Bank ice cream counter cafes at the Sunshine Plaza main entrance. The exhibit closed on July 31, 2011, as part of the park's $1.1 billion overhaul. Disney gave the replica to the Western Pacific Railroad Museum in Portola, California.

== In popular culture ==
Hank Williams' 1956 single "California Zephyr" is likely his take on the traditional "Wabash Cannonball," made famous by his hero Roy Acuff; the melody and references to American cities and towns are strikingly similar.

Jack Kerouac's 1962 novel Big Sur opens with a trip to California on the train:

...I had sneaked into San Francisco as I say, coming 3,000 miles from my home in Long Island (Northport) in a pleasant roomette on the California Zephyr train watching American roll by outside my private picture window, really happy for the first time in three years, staying in the roomette all three days and three nights with my instant coffee and sandwiches...

Ben Gibbard and Jay Farrar’s 2009 music album One Fast Move or I'm Gone and the associated documentary of the same name are based on Kerouac's novel Big Sur. The record opens with a song called “California Zephyr.”

Grant Hart (of Hüsker Dü fame) wrote a song called "California Zephyr" for his 2009 album Hot Wax. The song may be a paean to gay liberation, especially following the AIDS epidemic.
