= Denver Zephyr =

Streamlined passenger train in the U.S.

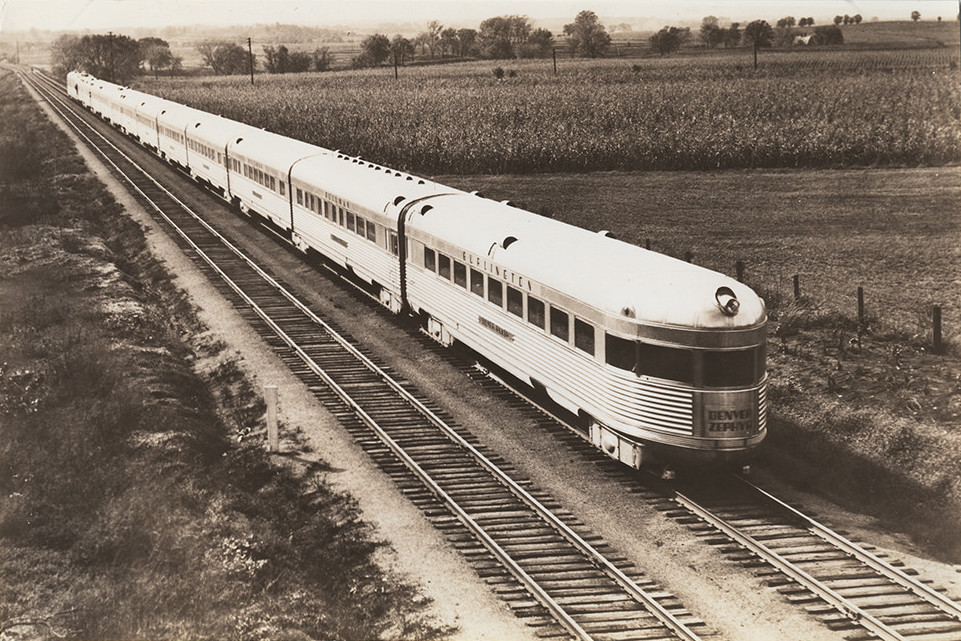
- The Denver Zephyr in 1936

Overview
- Service type: Inter-city rail
- Status: Discontinued
- Locale: Midwestern United States / Western United States
- First service: 1936
- Last service: 1973
- Successor: San Francisco Zephyr
- Former operators: Chicago, Burlington and Quincy Railroad; Burlington Northern Railroad; Amtrak

Route
- Termini: Chicago, Illinois; Colorado Springs, Colorado
- Distance travelled: 1,109 miles (1,785 km)
- Train numbers: 1 (westbound), 10 (eastbound)

On-board services
- Seating arrangements: Reclining seat coaches
- Sleeping arrangements: Roomettes and double bedrooms
- Catering facilities: Dining car
- Observation facilities: Vista dome observation lounge (1961)

The Denver Zephyr was a streamlined passenger train operated by the Chicago, Burlington and Quincy Railroad between Chicago, Illinois, and Denver, Colorado. In peak years it ran to Colorado Springs. It operated from 1936 to 1973. The Denver Zephyr continued operating after the Burlington Northern Railroad merger in 1970. BN conveyed the train to Amtrak in 1971; Amtrak merged it with the Denver–Oakland City of San Francisco to form the San Francisco Zephyr and dropped the "Denver" name in 1973.

== The first Denver Zephyrs ==
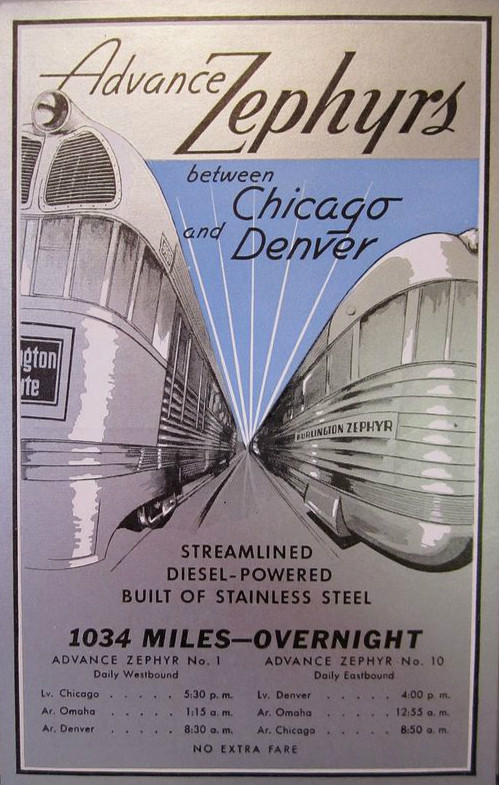
Early promotional postcard for the train. It is billed as the "Advance Zephyr" and when this card was printed, the train had yet to add any sleeping cars, being described as "coach only--for the present".

The first Zephyr service to Denver began May 31, 1936, with the trainsets of the Pioneer Zephyr and the Mark Twain Zephyr, trains 9900 and 9903. This new service was known as the Advance Denver Zephyr and operated on a 16-hour schedule. The trains did not have sleepers, but introduced hostesses called "Zephyrettes".

In the meantime, after the success of the 3-car and 4-car Pioneer Zephyr, Twin Zephyrs, and Mark Twain Zephyrs, the Burlington had ordered two pairs of longer stainless steel streamliners from the Budd Company. One pair was fully articulated 6-car trainsets used to replace the 3-car Twin Cities Zephyrs. The other pair were 10-car trainsets, partly articulated, which became the Chicago-Denver Denver Zephyr. Accommodations on these trains included coaches, sections, single and double rooms, and dining and lounge facilities. The observation cars carried parlor seats for local travel.

On October 23, 1936, one of the new ten-car trainsets made a special run nonstop Chicago to Denver in an effort to break the 1934 record of the Pioneer Zephyr between the two cities. The train went from Chicago to Denver in 12 hours, 12 minutes, and 27 seconds, at start-to-stop average of 83.89 miles per hour (135.01 km/h) and reached 116 miles per hour (187 km/h) between Akron and Brush in Colorado. Distance was given as 1,017.22 miles (1,637.06 km) via Plattsmouth direct to Lincoln, Nebraska, bypassing Omaha on the regular route of the train. The new trainsets went into regular service 16 days later, November 8, 1936, replacing the trainsets used on the route since May.

Power for the new trainsets came from the General Motors' Electro-Motive Division. Each was led by a twin-engine forerunner to the E series featuring two Winton V-12 201-A diesels of 900 horsepower (670 kW) each, articulated to a booster unit with one V-16 of 1,200 horsepower (890 kW) for a total rating of 3,000 horsepower (2,200 kW). These were bodied by Budd in shotwelded stainless steel, and designated 9906A/B "Silver King and Silver Queen" and 9907A/B "Silver Knight/Silver Princess".

The train ran 1,034 miles (1,664 km) between Denver and Chicago overnight in 16 to 16½ hours. Within two years a dinette coach and an all-room sleeper were added.

The trainsets were refurbished in the winter of 1948–49 and operated in DZ service until October 1956 when they were reassigned to the Denver–Fort Worth/Dallas Texas Zephyr route on Burlington subsidiaries Colorado and Southern and Fort Worth and Denver Railways.

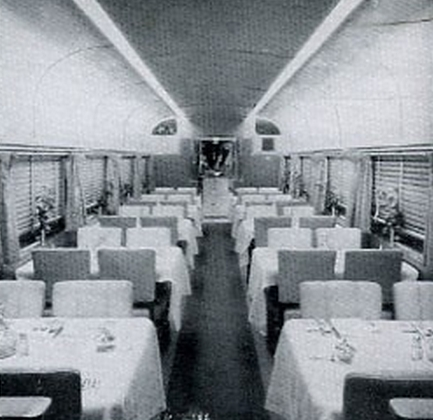
Dining car in 1940.

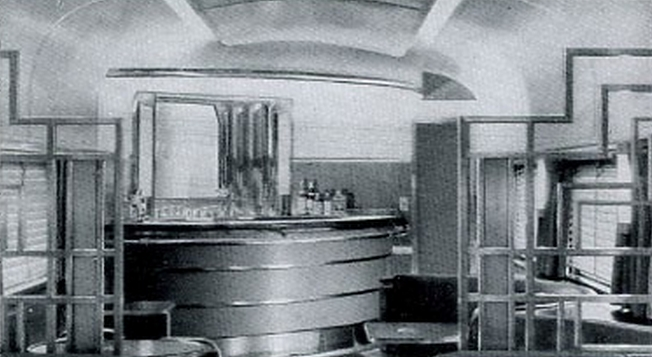
1940 lounge car.

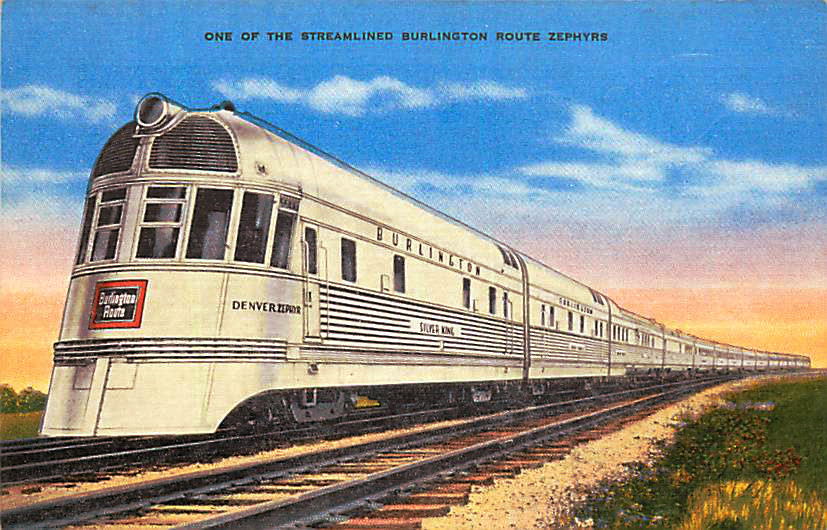
A colorized postcard showing a Silver King locomotive pulling 13 cars on the Burlington Route's Denver Zephyr (before 1956)

== The second Denver Zephyr ==
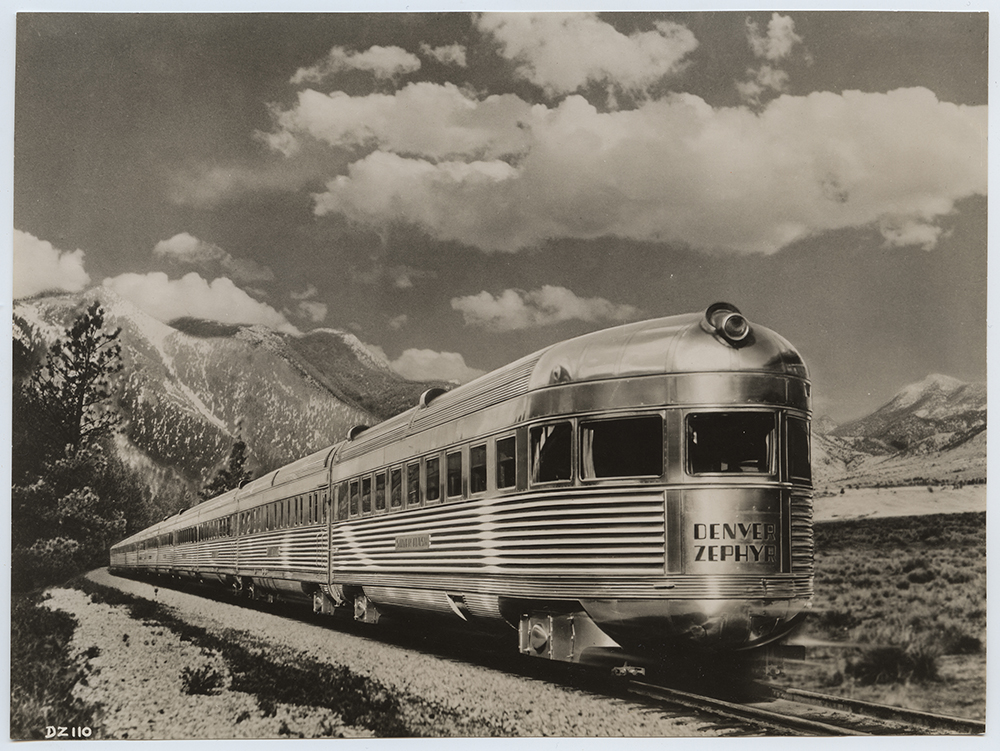
Promotional photo for the Denver Zephyr

Around 1953 Union Pacific began reequipping its competing City of Denver. In addition, the Burlington, Denver and Rio Grande Western, and Western Pacific Railroads had replaced their heavyweight Chicago-Oakland Exposition Flyer with a new streamlined California Zephyr carrying Vista-domes in 1949. Both of these trains took passengers from the DZ, but ridership remained respectable. But the train's consist — semi-articulated with a unique braking, steam connection system that was incompatible with other standard equipment — meant that cars could not be added to the train proper, but had to be added ahead of the baggage car or as a separate section. These cars needed their own food service, compromising the economics of adding the additional cars. The Burlington decided in 1955 to reequip the train with more conventional non-articulated equipment. Thus was conceived the last complete streamlined train to be built for a private railroad in the United States.

The new stainless steel train, also built by the Budd Company, offered all room sleeping accommodations and, in addition to a full diner, offered a Vista-dome coffee shop car called the Chuckwagon. Parlor seats continued to be available in the observation car. Because of the popularity of the Denver-Chicago segment of the Vista-dome California Zephyr, the new train also carried Vista-Domes. In addition, a new all room sleeping accommodation, the slumbercoach, offered private sleeping facilities, with in-room washstand and toilet, to passengers at coach fares plus a small surcharge. These cars were revolutionary in their use of fiberglass room modules. Each train carried two and they always were sold out, even up to the beginning of Amtrak. By 1959 slumbercoaches would appear on the trains of four other railroads, although three would later give them up. Between 1959 and late 1964, CB&Q's four cars and Northern Pacific Railway’s four cars were pooled in Denver Zephyr / North Coast Limited service. The pool required tight scheduling and good timekeeping and was discontinued when NP acquired eight additional slumbercoaches second-hand. Even though only 18 of these revolutionary cars were built new, they remained popular, even after operation of rail passenger service was assumed by Amtrak, and carried passengers until the mid-1990s, when age and changes in passenger car requirements forced their retirement.

The second Denver Zephyr began operation at the end of October 1956 and soon eclipsed its competitor, the Union Pacific Railroad's City of Denver. As the train now had conventional equipment it could be expanded with other cars of Burlington streamlined passenger car fleet as well as leased cars. During the summer months trains of 20 or more cars were not uncommon and during that and holiday seasons, the train often split into two sections.

With the 1956 reequipping the train also began to serve Colorado Springs. Sandwiched between the diner and the Chuckwagon, the section consisted of a coach, a slumbercoach, and a sleeper. These cars ran on the Denver and Rio Grande Railway's Royal Gorge passenger train between Denver and Colorado Springs.

Initially, the Chuckwagon operated with the section on to Colorado Springs, but, by the mid-1960s, to allow a longer service time between runs, the car ran only to Denver and a dome coach was substituted for the Chicago-Colorado Springs coach. On January 1, 1967, the Colorado Springs section was replaced by a bus connection.

Though the number of cars were reduced during the off-season, the train ran mostly intact until September 7, 1968, when the Chuckwagon became seasonal and the observation car, with its flat end and rear-diaphragm, became a midtrain lounge during the off season. The train name was retained by Amtrak in May 1971.

One consist of Denver Zephyr cars was sold to the Saudi Railways Organization, where it operated and subsequently went into storage in a yard in Eastern Saudi Arabia.

== The Zephyr under Amtrak ==
Amtrak took over in 1971 and decided to run the Denver Zephyr daily between Chicago and Denver. The Denver and Rio Grande Western Railway declined to join Amtrak, so the tri-weekly Union Pacific/Southern Pacific City of San Francisco was diverted from Cheyenne into Denver for combination with the Zephyr to Chicago. During the summer of 1971 the City and the Zephyr ran as separate sections (on the same schedule) between Denver and Chicago; after that summer the two trains were combined on the days the City ran. Amtrak renamed the City of San Francisco the San Francisco Zephyr on June 11, 1972. The Denver Zephyr name disappeared altogether on October 26, 1973. For several years afterward the San Francisco Zephyr carried Chicago–Denver cars.

== See also ==
Comparable streamliners of the era also serving Denver and Colorado Springs from the Midwest:

- Rocky Mountain Rocket — Rock Island Railroad
- Colorado Eagle — Missouri Pacific Railroad
