= Mother Is Gone =

Single by Hank Williams
- B-side: "Message to My Mother"
- Released: 1955
- Recorded: 1946 or 1948
- Genre: Country, Gospel
- Length: 2:28
- Label: MGM Records
- Songwriter(s): Hank Williams

"Mother Is Gone" is a song by Hank Williams. It had appeared in Williams' song folio in 1946 and was released as a posthumous single by MGM Records in 1955. The narrator in the song laments the passing of his mother, one of several compositions that Williams wrote containing a maternal theme that was likely influenced by Roy Acuff and other singers who recorded similar songs. The original recording was a demo Williams made for publishing company Acuff-Rose sometime between 1946 and 1949.
