= Zephyrette =

California Zephyr passenger train hostess

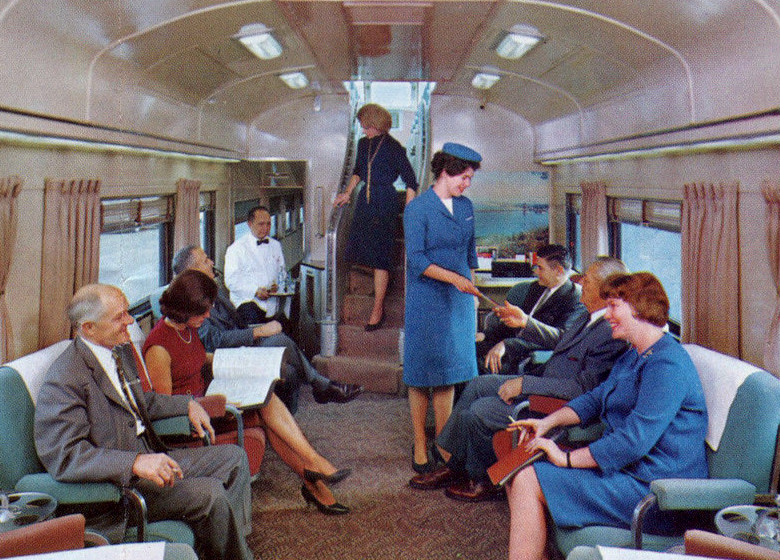
A Zephyrette (center, in blue uniform) at work on the lower level of a California Zephyr Vista-Dome car in 1967

A Zephyrette was a hostess on the California Zephyr between 1949 and 1970, while the train was jointly operated by the Chicago, Burlington and Quincy Railroad, the Denver and Rio Grande Western Railroad, and the Western Pacific Railroad. The position was the brainchild of Velma McPeek, the Burlington's Supervisor of Passenger Train Services, and was part of an effort to attract families to rail travel and accommodate their needs. Zephyrettes first appeared on the Denver Zephyr in 1936, and shortly thereafter on the Twin Cities Zephyr, but the position was discontinued during World War II. Zephyrettes resumed service after the war in 1949, but only on the California Zephyr.

To qualify, a prospective Zephyrette had to fulfill a variety of criteria, from being single and either a college graduate or a registered nurse to being between 24 and 28 years old and between 5 ft 4 in (1.63 m) and 5 ft 8 in (1.73 m) tall. Once employed, Zephyrettes were expected to conduct themselves with "dignity and poise" and also refrain from smoking or drinking while in uniform, among other requirements. Somewhat akin to an air line stewardess, the roles played by a Zephyrette were many, from hostess and tour guide to first aid responder and babysitter.

The Zephyrettes became lasting symbols of the California Zephyr, wearing distinctive uniforms and appearing in both promotional literature and magazine advertisements, and they would remain a constant presence on the train until it was discontinued on March 22, 1970. A number married other railroad employees or former passengers, and one even had the honor of christening Amtrak's inaugural California Zephyr on July 17, 1983.

== Background ==
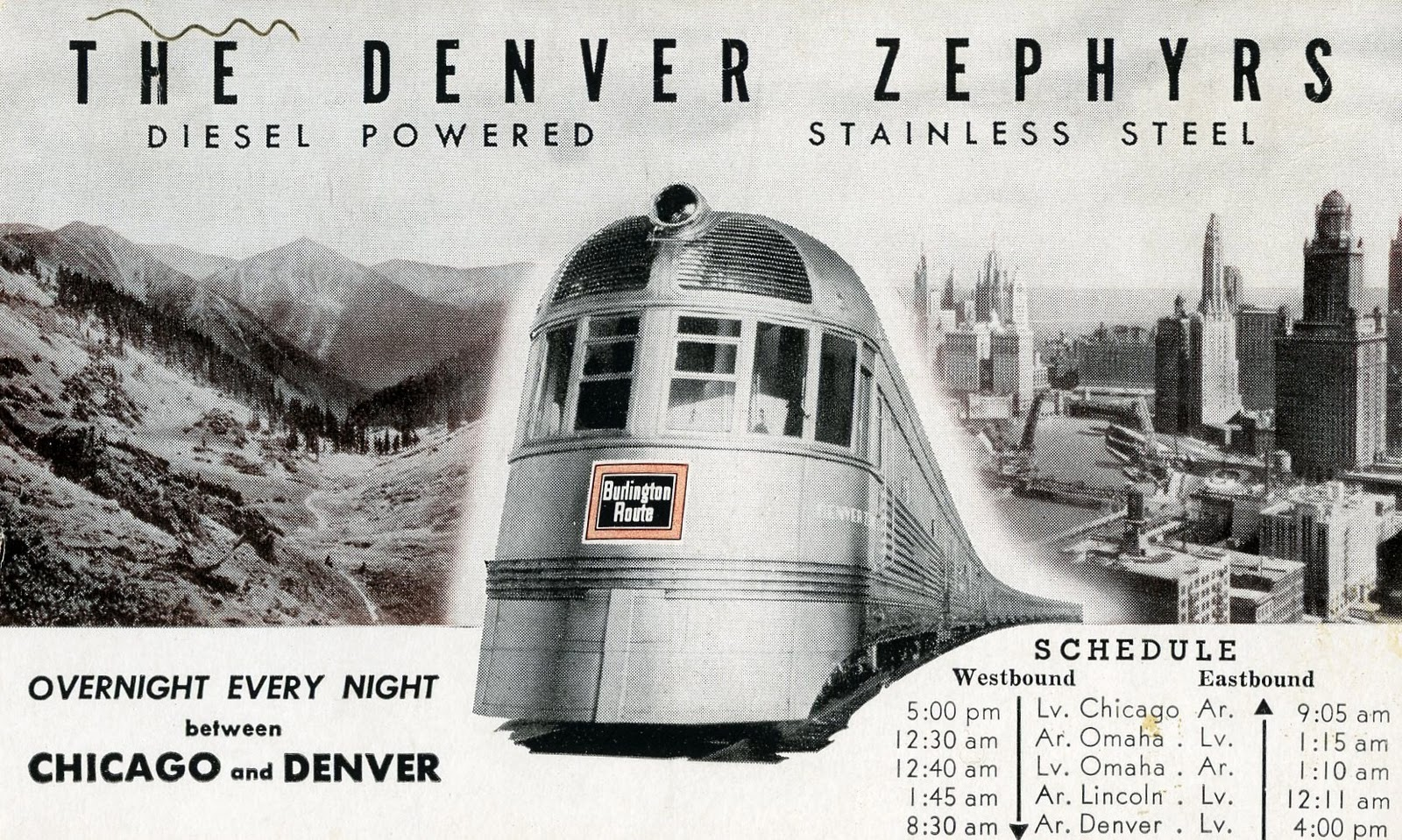
A promotional postcard for the Denver Zephyr, the first train to feature Zephyrettes

The position of Zephyrette was predated by other pioneering positions open to women in the American railroad industry. The "Harvey Girls" had been employed by Harvey Houses along the Atchison, Topeka and Santa Fe Railway since the 1880s, although they were not part of the railroad's on-board crew. In August 1935, the Union Pacific Railroad began its groundbreaking employment of "nurse-stewardesses" aboard passenger trains when it hired Florette Welp. In order to qualify, women interested in the position had to be registered nurses between the ages of 21 and 24.

The name "Zephyrette" is derived from the Zephyr trains run by the Chicago, Burlington and Quincy Railroad, beginning with the revolutionary streamlined, stainless steel, diesel-powered Pioneer Zephyr that debuted in 1934. After the Pioneer Zephyr made its historic dawn-to-dusk run from Denver to Chicago in May 1934, coinciding with the Century of Progress International Exposition, the Burlington decided to implement an overnight Denver Zephyr between the two cities in 1936.

Burlington management also arrived at the conclusion that the future of passenger rail travel would be largely dependent on successfully attracting families and accommodating their needs, not just serving businessmen. Desiring to put a woman in a management position to help achieve this goal, the Burlington hired Velma McPeek, a former schoolteacher and manager of a department store tea room, as its new Supervisor of Passenger Train Services. One of McPeek's first initiatives was to create a corps of hostesses who would serve as liaisons between a train's passengers and the conductor while endeavoring to make themselves "helpful and generally agreeable with the passengers". It was this corps of hostesses who would become the Zephyrettes.

== Trains and schedule ==
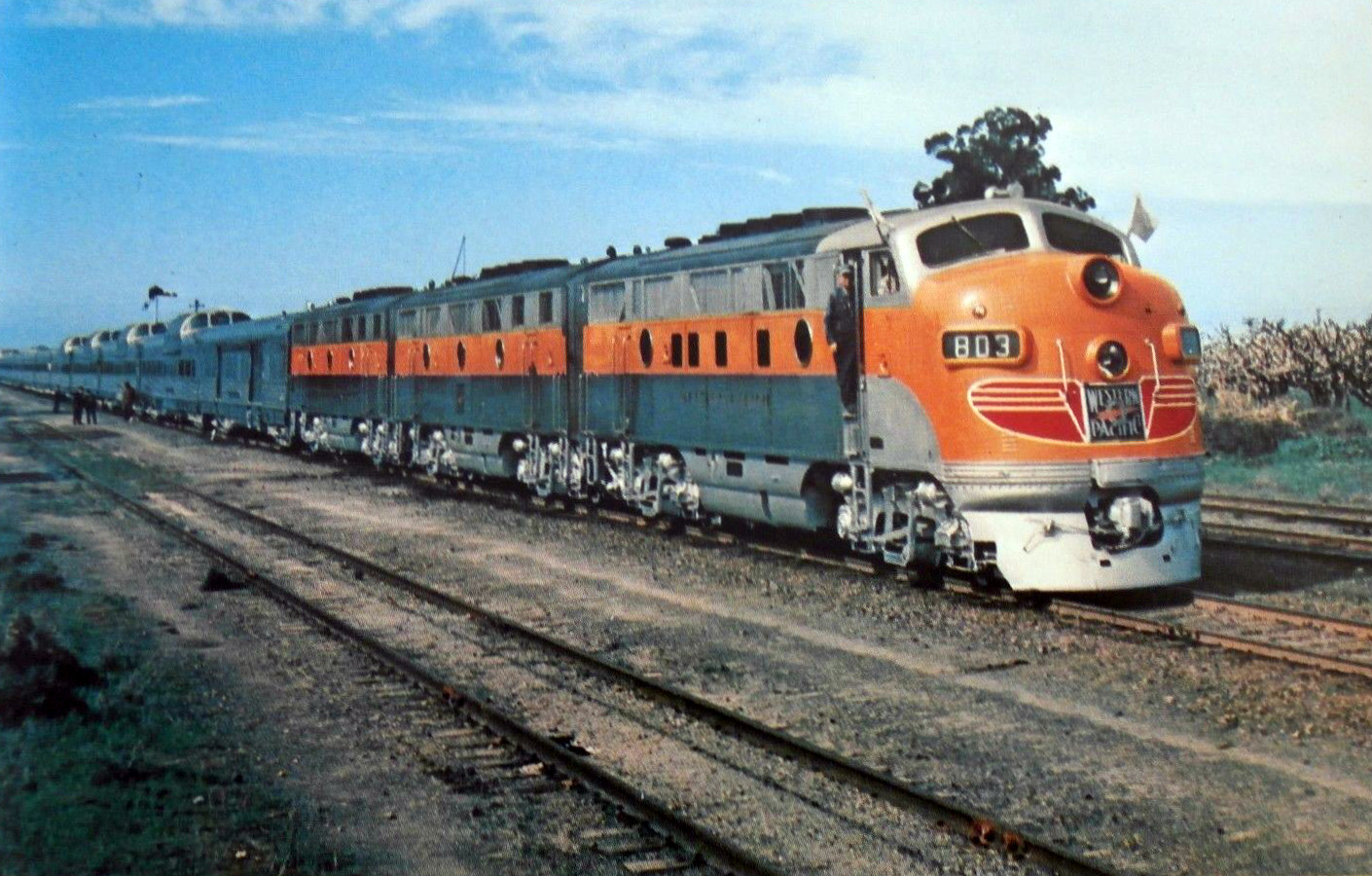
The California Zephyr under Western Pacific power in 1949, the first year that Zephyrettes were assigned to the train

The Zephyrettes made their debut on the Denver Zephyr in 1936, and shortly thereafter appeared on the Twin Cities Zephyr as well. The position was discontinued during World War II, as domestic passenger rail service was reduced to essentially the bare necessities as American railroads tried to conserve resources for the war effort while also providing for the movement of military personnel across the country on troop trains. After the end of the war, McPeek was instrumental in restoring the Zephyrettes to the Burlington's passenger service, albeit only on the California Zephyr. The Zephyrettes would be a constant presence on the train from 1949 until it was discontinued in 1970. They constituted one of a number of McPeek's efforts to make the train more friendly to women, children, and families; some of her other ideas were successful, such as lowering the height of car windows to allow for easier viewing, while others were not, such as setting aside a portion of one car for women and children only.

The Zephyrettes were hired in Chicago, first by McPeek and later by her successor, Mary Lou Gordon. While the California Zephyr was jointly operated by the Burlington, the Denver and Rio Grande Western Railroad, and the Western Pacific Railroad, the Zephyrettes were technically Western Pacific employees and thus paid in San Francisco. At any one time, there were 10 or 11 Zephyrettes who were actively employed, with six in transit aboard trains (three heading in either direction) and two on layovers (one in San Francisco and the other in Chicago), and perhaps also an occasional trainee. A typical itinerary for a Zephyrette consisted of the two and a half day trip on the eastbound California Zephyr, a night layover at the Hilton Chicago, another two and a half day trip westbound, and then two and a half days off in San Francisco. Over the course of a month, a Zepyhrette would generally make three round trips. Some Zephyrettes worked other jobs while not aboard the California Zephyr: one, Rita Pelz, modeled for I. Magnin. The average tenure of employment for a Zephyrette was one and a half years, but some served much longer: Nellie O'Grady was already in her seventh year with the California Zephyr when she wrote about her experiences in the December 1955 issue of The Saturday Evening Post.

== Qualifications and requirements ==
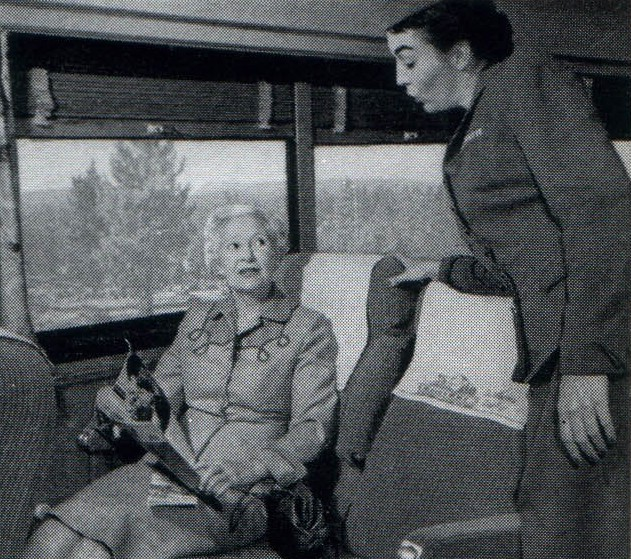
Zephyrette Nellie O'Grady interacting with a passenger in 1956

In order to qualify, prospective Zephyrettes originally had to be single, either college graduates or trained as registered nurses, between 24 and 28 years of age, between 5 ft 4 in (1.63 m) and 5 ft 8 in (1.73 m) tall, and of "good character with a pleasing personality". Some of these criteria were eventually relaxed, however, as Jane Smith was hired at age 23 in 1958 and Cathy Moran had not finished college when hired in 1969. Smith was initially recruited by American Airlines as a stewardess, but did not enjoy flying. The original class of Zephyrettes completed a 30-day training course prior to beginning their duties, while all subsequently hired employees received only on-the-job training from an experienced Zephyrette.

Once employed, Zephyrettes were required to conduct themselves with "dignity and poise", refrain from smoking or drinking while in uniform, and avoid fraternizing with passengers while they were drinking. Perhaps not coincidentally, Zephyrette Julie Ann Lyman observed that her greatest cravings upon disembarking the train in San Francisco, aside from a bath (the train had no bathing facilities), were for a cigarette and a glass of wine. Zephyrettes were also forbidden to receive tips from passengers, although they were permitted to accept cards and gifts. McPeek, who was affectionately referred to as "Mama" McPeek by many Zephyrettes, was quite protective of them and did not hesitate to write them letters of advice and encouragement; she was especially concerned about the effects of gossip on the Zephyrettes.

== Duties ==
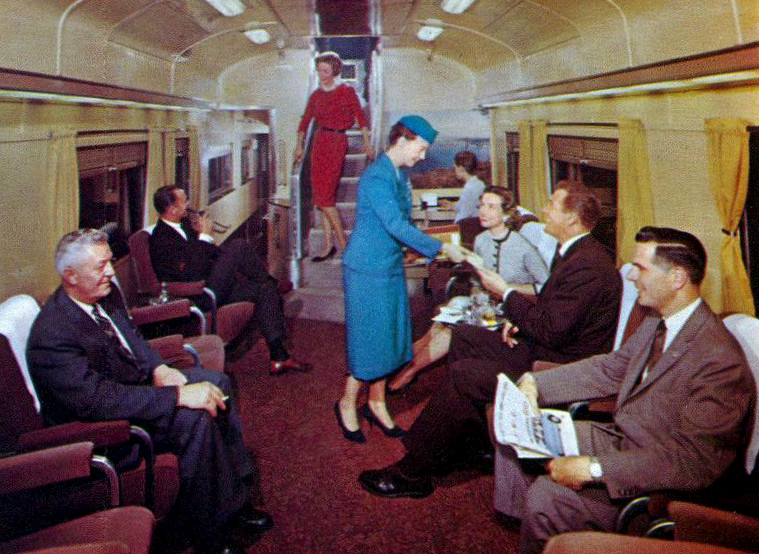
A Zephyrette at work in 1961

Described by Lyman as "the railroad's answer to the air line stewardess", some of the many duties of a Zephyrette included welcoming passengers, making announcements on the train's public address system, sending telegrams, and taking dinner reservations, which on the California Zephyr was a complicated undertaking due to the system of multiple seatings necessitated by the relative lack of space in the dining car. Zephyrettes were also responsible for communicating with the conductors to ensure that passengers boarding at intermediate stations were not neglected, providing for parlor games such as bridge or canasta, and babysitting children and sometimes even pets. Near the end of the California Zephyr's existence, as equipment failures ranging from malfunctioning heaters to public address systems became more common, they essentially became apologists for the train itself. Generally, Zephyrettes also served as liaisons between new passengers who were unfamiliar with railroading conventions and the various other members of the crew, such as porters.

Zephyrettes played a variety of different roles, from hostess and tour guide to first aid responder and babysitter, giving attention to all passengers, often with an emphasis on the handicapped, elderly, and children. Sometimes what was required of them was as simple as providing directions; Smith joked that if she had written a memoir about her experiences as a Zephyrette, she would have entitled it Which Way is the Diner?, noting that was a frequent question even in the Dome-Observation car (the last car on the train). Other times it was much more difficult; in 1955, Zephyrette Helen Schwartz, with the assistance of porter Roosevelt Williams and two female passengers, successfully delivered a baby on the train outside of Grand Junction, Colorado. That child, Peter Zars, would return to the California Zephyr to celebrate his seventh birthday, again with the assistance of a Zephyrette. Due to the train's prestige, famous passengers were quite common, and Zephyrettes interacted with them directly, from Bernard Baruch and Pierre Monteux to Mamie Eisenhower and professional baseball players.

O'Grady analogized the duties of a Zephyrette to "being hostess to a house party of 300 self-invited guests whom you don't know". Lyman described her experience on a 1963 California Zephyr trip as "48 hours answering every wish and whim of the 287 passengers", and then estimated that she walked 25 miles (40 km) while performing her duties. O'Grady wore a pedometer on three consecutive round trips, over which she had walked a total of 100 miles (160 km). At the end of her 16-hour workday, the Zephyrette would retire to her personal quarters at the rear of the Dome-Buffet car, next to the sleeping quarters reserved for the train's chefs and waiters. Every evening, she would prepare a detailed daily report focusing on passenger needs, which was then forwarded to the railroad's management offices in Chicago for the purpose of assessing and adjusting the California Zephyr's various features and services. The train's Zephyrette officially went off duty at approximately 10 pm, although she could still be summoned overnight via her call bell, and often was.

== Uniform ==
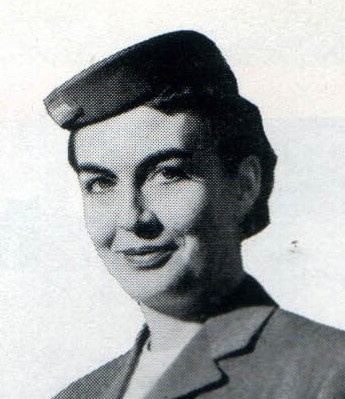
O'Grady wearing her military-style hat, 1956

The original, pre-World War II Zephyrette uniforms differed seasonally: during winter, they consisted of gray suits with red, silk-lined capes, while in the summer they were lightweight white silk suits paired with navy blouses. The resumption of Zephyrette service on the California Zephyr in 1949 came with an entirely new uniform, which consisted of two-piece teal blue suits worn with military-style hats, monogrammed white blouses, and Zephyr pins. Over the years, these uniforms gradually evolved: the skirts became shorter, the design of the hats changed, and the monograms disappeared altogether.

In 1963, Gordon collaborated with tailor Ralph Helperin to completely redesign the uniforms, giving them a more modern appearance, complete with a brighter shade of blue. Later in the 1960s, the uniforms were changed to brown. In 1970, the last year of operation for the California Zephyr, Moran wore airline-inspired dresses, one blue with a white stripe down the side and the other green with a similar orange stripe, that she believes would have become the regular uniform had the train continued for another year.

== Legacy ==
The Zephyrettes became symbols of the California Zephyr, and appeared in both the train's promotional literature and a few magazine advertisements. They remained a constant presence on the train until the very end, on March 22, 1970, when the final California Zephyr completed its last trip at Chicago Union Station. While the average tenure of employment for a Zephyrette was only one and a half years, many made lasting connections on the train, and some married other railroad employees or former passengers. Moran married a brakeman who also served on the California Zephyr, Ernie von Ibsch, after he initially asked her out on a date the very night the train was discontinued.

On July 17, 1983, former Zephyrette Beulah Bauman was chosen to christen Amtrak's California Zephyr before it departed Denver Union Station on its inaugural journey. Furthermore, in 2011, a group of former Zephyrettes held their first reunion in San Francisco. In 2013, approximately 20 attended a second Zephyrette reunion in Glenwood Springs, Colorado, where they visited the Glenwood Springs Railway Museum inside the city's Amtrak station.
