= A Teardrop on a Rose =

Single by Hank Williams
- B-side: "Alone and Forsaken"
- Released: July 1955
- Recorded: 1952 (Unconfirmed)
- Genre: Country, Gospel
- Length: 2:30
- Label: MGM Records
- Songwriter: Hank Williams

Hank Williams singles chronology
"Message to My Mother" (1955)	"A Teardrop on a Rose" (1955)	"California Zephyr" (1956)

"A Teardrop on a Rose" is a song written by Hank Williams.

== Background ==
According to Williams biographer Colin Escott, "A Teardrop on a Rose" was a "parlor piece that Hank had been toying with for years." It was one of several songs that Williams pitched to his friend Braxton Schuffert, a fellow Alabamian country singer who went on to release the song in 1950.

When Williams asked him what he thought of the song, Shuffert later recalled, "I told him it was one of the most beautiful songs I ever heard, and Hank said I could have it if I wanted."

MGM eventually released a demo version that Williams likely recorded in 1952. Tommy Edwards and Connie Stevens each recorded a version of the song.
