= Message to My Mother =

Single by Hank Williams
- A-side: "Mother Is Gone"
- Released: April 1955
- Recorded: 1950 (unconformed)
- Genre: Country, folk
- Length: 2:17
- Label: MGM Records
- Songwriter: Hank Williams

Hank Williams singles chronology
| "The Angel of Death" (1954) | "Message to My Mother" (1955) | "A Teardrop on a Rose" (1955) |

"Message to my Mother" is a song written by Hank Williams. It was recorded as a demo in 1951 and released by MGM Records in 1955, two years after its composer's death. It is notable for its length, clocking in at just over four minutes, which is unusual for a Williams song. The song tells the story of a young man on his deathbed imploring those around him to let his long-suffering mother know he has been saved. The song displays a clear Roy Acuff influence, whose songs with similar themes had a profound influence on a young Williams.
