= Rio Grande Zephyr =

Former American passenger train

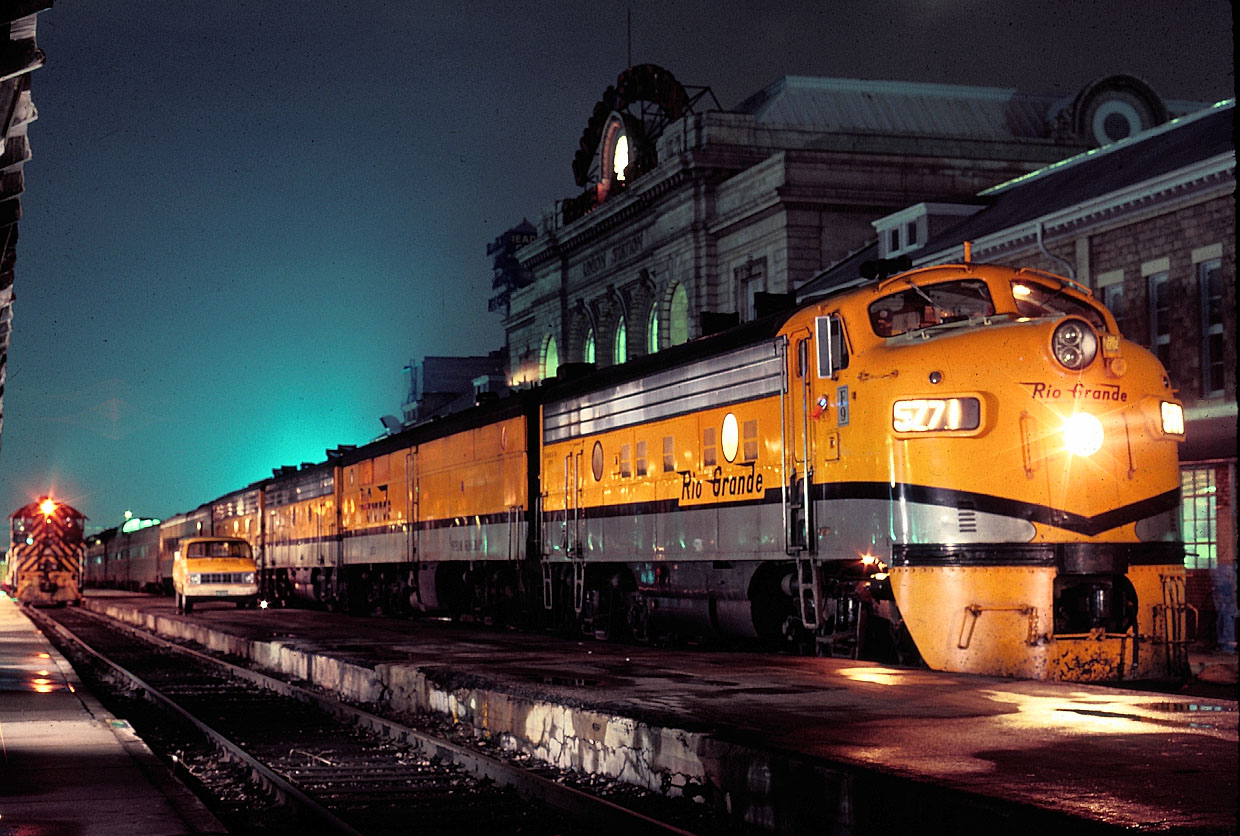
- Rio Grande Zephyr in April 1983

Overview
- Service type: Inter-city rail
- Status: Discontinued
- Locale: Western United States
- Predecessor: California Zephyr
- First service: 1970; 56 years ago
- Last service: April 24, 1983; 43 years ago
- Successor: California Zephyr
- Former operator: Denver and Rio Grande Western Railroad

Route
- Termini: Denver, Colorado; Ogden, Utah

The Rio Grande Zephyr was a passenger train operated by Denver and Rio Grande Western Railroad (D&RGW or Rio Grande) between Denver, Colorado and Ogden, Utah from 1970 until 1983. In operation after the creation of publicly funded Amtrak, the Rio Grande Zephyr was the last privately operated interstate passenger train in the United States.

== History ==
The train was a remnant of the original California Zephyr, which was jointly operated by the Chicago, Burlington and Quincy Railroad, Denver and Rio Grande Western Railroad, and Western Pacific Railroad. This iteration of the Zephyr ended operations on March 22, 1970, when the Western Pacific discontinued its portion.

The Rio Grande Zephyr commenced operation using the D&RGW's portion of the California Zephyr route from Denver, Colorado to Salt Lake City, Utah. The route was extended to Ogden, Utah to allow for California-bound passengers to connect to the City of San Francisco and later the San Francisco Zephyr, which did not serve Salt Lake City. The Rio Grande Zephyr used mostly the same equipment and staff as was formerly used for the California Zephyr. Since the train was no longer an overnight affair, sleeping cars and a full baggage car were not required. The D&RGW sold its sleepers to the Ferrocarriles Nacionales de México, while their one baggage car was sold to the Algoma Central Railway in Canada.

Amtrak planned to resume operation of the original California Zephyr on May 1, 1971. The D&RGW and Amtrak could not come to terms over a contract agreement, however, and, just four days before Amtrak began operations, Union Pacific's Overland Route was substituted for the Rio Grande's Moffat Tunnel Route. The Amtrak service was initially named the San Francisco Zephyr, as the route combined portions of the routes of the former California Zephyr and the City of San Francisco trains.

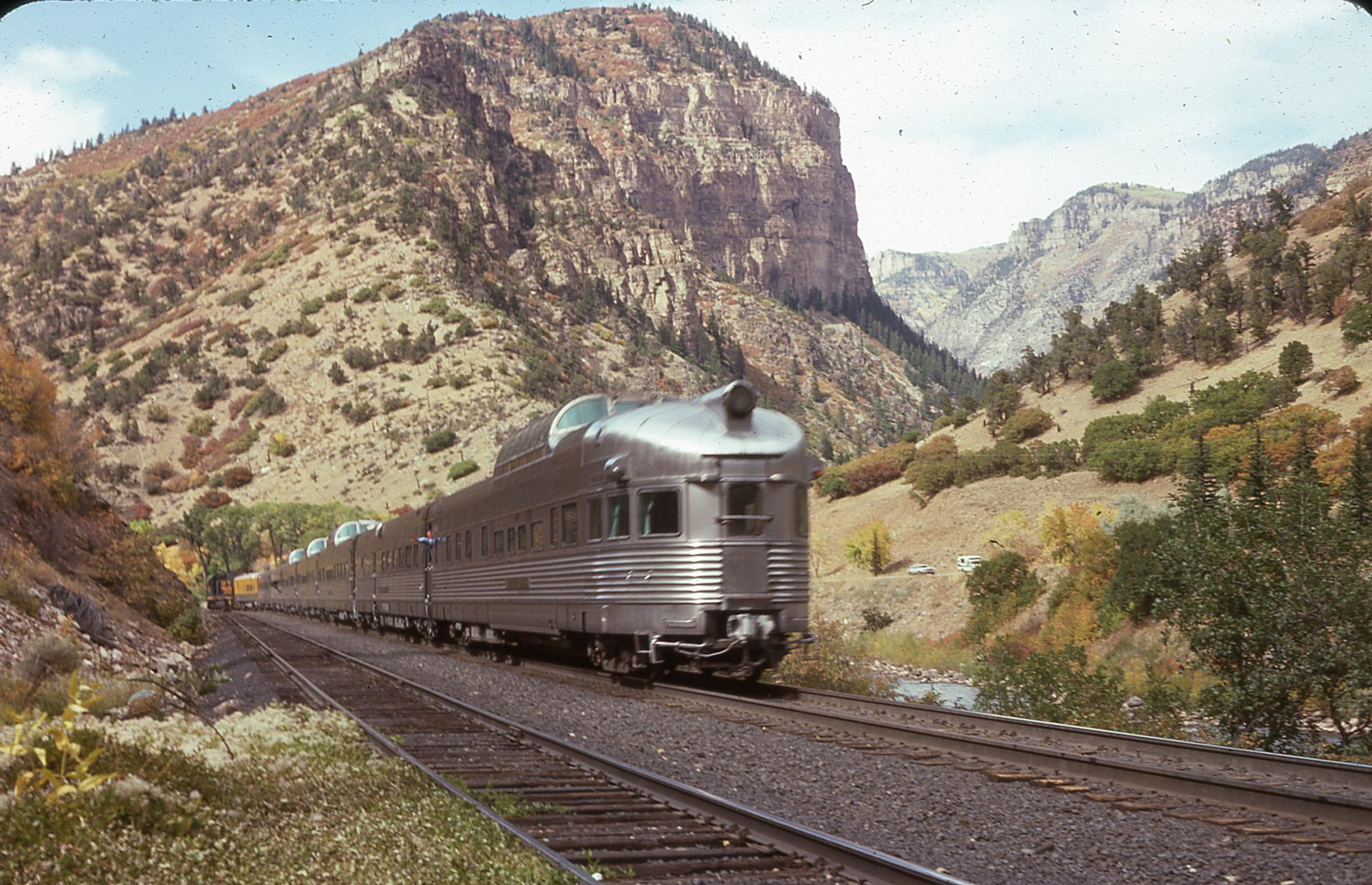
Rio Grande Zephyr in Glenwood Canyon, 1975

For twelve years, the Rio Grande Zephyr operated three days a week in each direction. It never operated on Wednesday. In 1983, the D&RGW reversed its earlier opposition and elected to join Amtrak, citing increasing losses in passenger operations. Amtrak re-routed the San Francisco Zephyr over the D&RGW's main line between Denver and Salt Lake City, Utah, which had been the original preferred route in 1971. The change was initially scheduled for April 25, but a mudslide at Thistle, Utah closed the D&RGW's main line and delayed the change until July 16. While the Utah portion of the line was closed, the Rio Grande Zephyr continued to operate on a truncated route between Denver and Grand Junction, Colorado until the train was discontinued on April 24, 1983. After the D&RGW tracks were re-opened, Amtrak revived the California Zephyr name.

The modern California Zephyr uses the route of the Rio Grande Zephyr from Denver to Salt Lake City; service to Ogden was discontinued. Intercity rail service between Salt Lake City and Ogden was still available via the Desert Wind and Pioneer passenger trains until these were discontinued in 1997. Passenger rail service between Ogden and Salt Lake City was restored in April 2008 with the startup of FrontRunner commuter trains.

== Equipment used ==
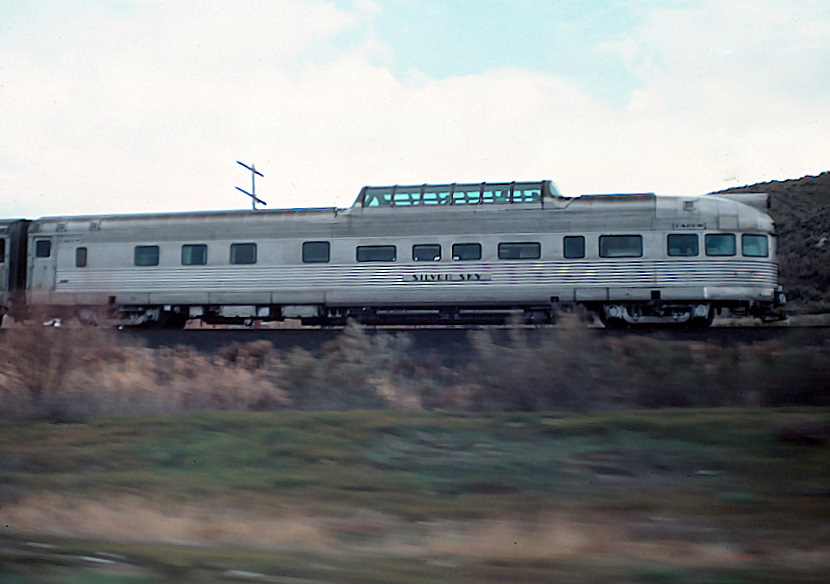
Silver Sky on one of the last Rio Grande Zephyr runs in 1983

The equipment used when the Rio Grande Zephyr began service was as follows:

- EMD F9 locomotives (A-B or A-B-B) F-9A 5771, F-9B's 5762 and 5763
- Steam generator car rebuilt from an ALCo PB1 252 or 253
- Combine 1230 or 1231
- Coach – Silver Aspen
- Coach - Silver Pine
- Vista-Dome Coach – Silver Bronco
- Vista-Dome chair car – Silver Pony
- Vista-Dome chair car – Silver Colt
- Vista-Dome chair car – Silver Mustang
- Vista-Dome dormitory-buffet-lounge car – Silver Shop
- Diner (48 seats) – Silver Banquet
- Vista-Dome buffet-lounge-observation – Silver Sky

The combine, dome coach(es), dome lounge or diner, and dome-lounge-observation were always in the consist. The size and configuration of the train varied daily based on the number of tickets sold. All cars carried the prefix Silver in their name, a holdover from their days in California Zephyr service. Silver Aspen and Silver Pine were rebuilt in 1962–1963 from 16-section sleeping cars.

After the train was discontinued, several Silver cars were transferred to Amtrak, as other railroads had done at Amtrak's inception. However, by this time Amtrak was moving to retire its older, inherited railcars. These cars are referred to as its Heritage Fleet. As a result, the ex-Rio Grande Zephyr cars were never used in regular revenue service for Amtrak. The cars sent to Amtrak were dome coaches Silver Colt, Silver Mustang and Silver Pony, flat-top coaches Silver Aspen and Silver Pine, and dining car Silver Banquet. Unfortunately, due to a center sill crack in Silver Banquet's frame, the car was soon scrapped.

In 1987, dome-buffet-dorm Silver Shop and dome-observation Silver Sky were traded to Via Rail Canada as part of a deal to re-equip the Rio Grande Ski Train with ex-Via Tempo cars. They were never operated by VIA. Silver Sky was sold in 2004 and Silver Shop was sold in 2006. Silver Sky is stored in Saginaw, Michigan.

Dome-coach Silver Bronco was retained by the D&RGW, subsequently becoming the property of the railroad's parent company Ansco. In 2006, the Silver Bronco was sold by Ansco, becoming the last car built for the California Zephyr to pass into private ownership after spending all of its 57 years with the Rio Grande.

== Communities served ==
From east to west, the communities with regular station stops on this train were:

- Denver, Colorado
- Granby, Colorado
- Bond, Colorado
- Glenwood Springs, Colorado
- Rifle, Colorado
- Grand Junction, Colorado
- Thompson Springs, Utah
- Green River, Utah
- Price, Utah
- Helper, Utah
- Provo, Utah
- Salt Lake City, Utah
- Ogden, Utah (A bus service eventually replaced the Salt Lake City–Ogden portion)
