= Denver and Rio Grande Western Depot (Salt Lake City) =

Former train station in Salt Lake City, Utah, U.S.

Rio Grande Depot
- Rio Grande Depot, June 2026

General information
- Location: 300 S. Rio Grande, Salt Lake City
- System: Former D&RGW Railroad and Amtrak station
- Owner: State of Utah
- Tracks: None remaining

Construction
- Structure type: At-grade

Other information
- Station code: SLC

History
- Opened: 1910
- Closed: 1999 (passenger service)

Former services
Preceding station	Amtrak	Following station
Elko toward Emeryville	California Zephyr	Provo toward Chicago
Milford toward Los Angeles	Desert Wind Discontinued in 1997	Provo toward Chicago
Delta Dropped in 1988 toward Los Angeles	Desert Wind Discontinued in 1997	Provo toward Chicago
Ogden toward Seattle	Pioneer Before 1991 reroute	Provo toward Chicago
Preceding station	Denver and Rio Grande Western Railroad	Following station
Ogden Terminus	Moffat Tunnel Route Discontinued 1983	Provo toward Denver
Ogden Terminus	Royal Gorge Route	Provo toward Denver
through to Oakland via WP Feather River Route	California Zephyr	Provo toward Chicago
Preceding station	Western Pacific Railroad	Following station
Burmester toward Oakland	Feather River Route	Terminus
Wendover toward Oakland	California Zephyr	through to Chicago via Rio Grande Main Line
- Denver and Rio Grande Railroad Station
- U.S. National Register of Historic Places
- Location within Utah Location within the United States
- Coordinates: 40°45′46″N 111°54′16″W
- Area: 2 acres (0.81 ha)
- Built: 1910
- Architect: Henry J. Schlacks
- Architectural style: Renaissance Revival, Beaux-Arts
- NRHP reference No.: 75001815
- Added to NRHP: 25 September 1975
Location

The Denver and Rio Grande Western Depot, commonly referred to as the Rio Grande Depot, is a former train station on the western edge of Downtown Salt Lake City.

== History ==
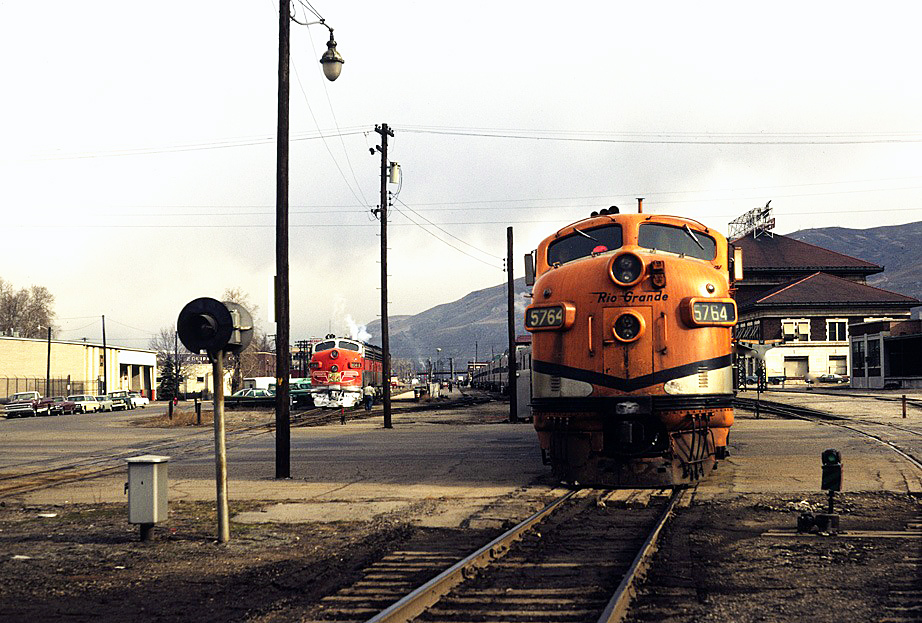
California Zephyr at the depot on its last western run, 1970

The depot was constructed by the Denver and Rio Grande Western Railroad in 1910 at a cost of US$750,000. The depot was the main jewel of the Denver and Rio Grande Western Railroad, and was designed by Chicago architect Henry Schlacks, who was best known in Chicago for his design of churches, but had also designed the Denver and Rio Grande Depot in Grand Junction, Colorado, for the railroad. It was specifically intended to surpass the nearby Salt Lake City Union Pacific Depot, which had been built the previous year for US$300,000. Schlacks's relationship with D&RG was fraught with antagonism, mainly over his pay, which led to delay in the depot's construction. One interesting, and ironic, point was that Schlacks's brother was D&RG's vice president.

The depot was built with elements of Renaissance Revival and Beaux Arts. The high-arched windows at the center were originally installed with green glass to keep the waiting area cool. The depot included a barber shop, a restaurant, a men's smoking room and a women's lounge. There was also a telegraph office and a souvenir/snack bar. The depot opened Salt Lake City to a new influx of immigrants. The depot was also a central point in shipping soldiers off to war in both World War I and World War II. The rise of highway auto travel in the 1950s struck a blow to rail travel and service at the depot dwindled.

The depot was listed on the National Register of Historic Places in 1975. The State of Utah purchased the depot in 1977 for US$1 and the building is currently home to the Utah State Historical Society and its research center, the Utah Department of Heritage & Arts, as well as the Rio Gallery.

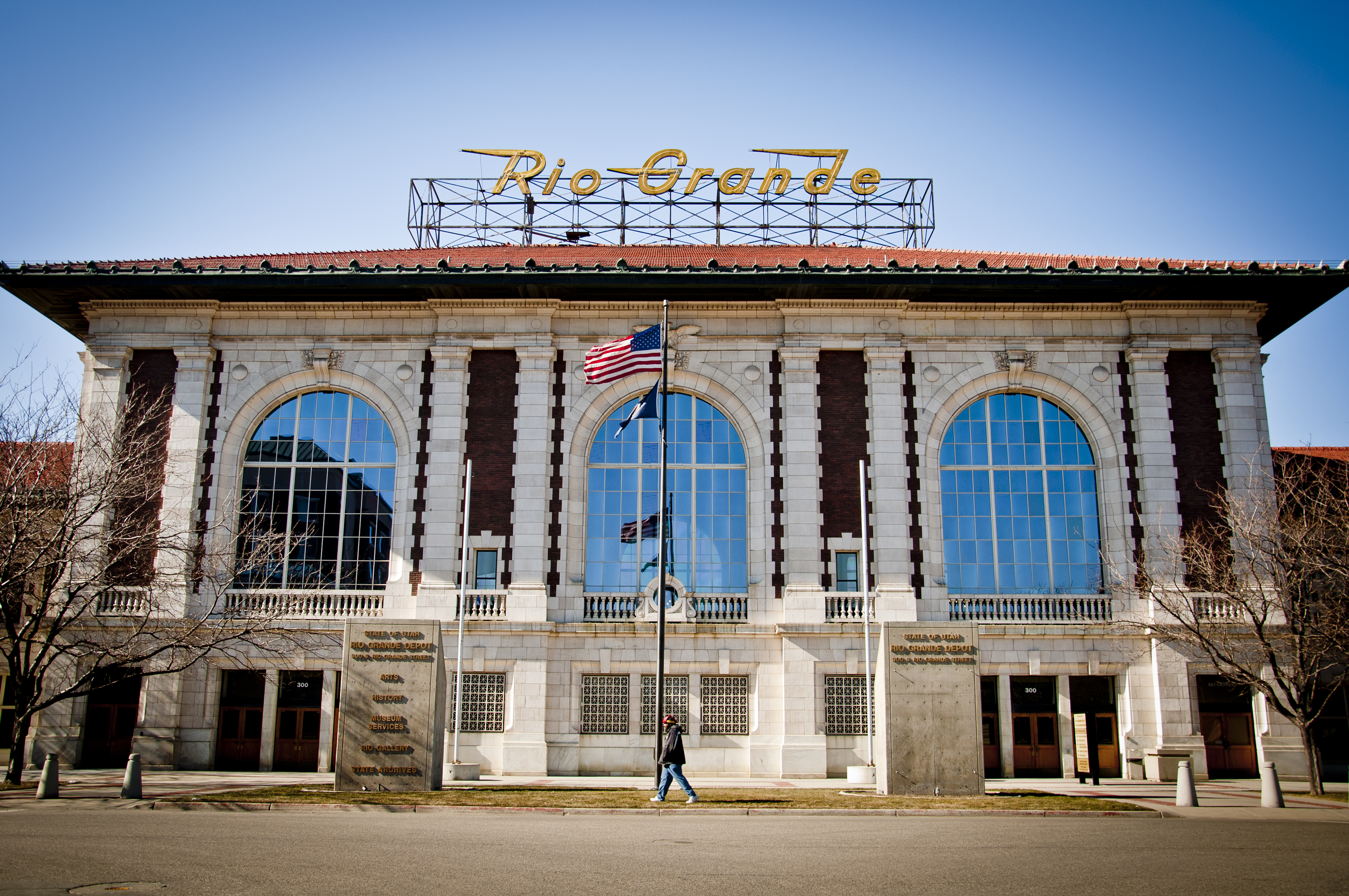
Rio Grande Depot, February 2011

The depot was damaged during the 2020 Salt Lake City earthquake, requiring tenants (including a café and the Utah Division of State History) to relocate.

=== Amtrak ===
From 1986 to 1999, the depot served as Salt Lake City's Amtrak station, replacing the Union Pacific Depot. It was served by the California Zephyr, Desert Wind, and Pioneer trains, with the latter two having been discontinued in 1997. The California Zephyr runs once daily between Chicago and Emeryville, California. The former Desert Wind ran daily from Chicago to Los Angeles, and the former Pioneer ran daily Chicago to Seattle. By 1999, Amtrak had moved to the Salt Lake City Intermodal Hub, after which the tracks near the depot were permanently removed.

== Future ==
Since 2015, the Salt Lake City Redevelopment Agency has designated the areas directly west of the Rio Grande Depot as "Station Center" and made their redevelopment into a mixed-use, transit-oriented district one of its priorities. The Depot itself is now considered by the agency to be a "barrier to development" because of its position blocking 300 South Street.

=== Rio Grande Plan ===
In 2020, citizen professionals proposed reopening the depot as Salt Lake City's main passenger rail terminal, replacing Salt Lake Central Station. The Rio Grande Plan would move downtown rail traffic underground into a cut-and-cover trench along 500 West, with Amtrak and FrontRunner trains serving platforms near the depot.

In February 2023, Salt Lake City was awarded a federal grant to study solutions to the east–west divide, including the Rio Grande Plan. In December 2023, a city screening analysis estimated the revised project would cost between $3 billion and $5 billion.

In 2020, citizen professionals proposed reopening the Depot as Salt Lake City's main passenger rail and bus terminal, replacing Salt Lake Central Station. The "Rio Grande Plan" would move all downtown rail traffic underground into a cut-and-cover trench along 500 West, with Amtrak and FrontRunner trains serving sunlit platforms on the west side of the Depot. UTA's bus and TRAX light rail routes would stop at the east side of the Depot on Rio Grande Street, while regional buses would board at the north and south sides. The proposal would also eliminate three overpasses, five grade crossings, and 52 acres of rail yards—opening up redevelopment opportunities while improving safety and connectivity. The authors estimate the cost of the project would be $300 to $500 million, pointing to comparable work in Reno and Denver.

Left side of the Denver and Rio Grande Western Depot in Salt Lake City on June 17th, 2026.

By 2021, the plan had started to gain traction among the Salt Lake City Council and other stakeholders. To move forward, the plan would require buy-in from the Utah state government, UTA, and Union Pacific.

In February 2023 Salt Lake City was awarded a federal grant to study solutions to the east–west divide, including the Rio Grande Plan.

In December 2023, Salt Lake City revealed that it had conducted a screening analysis on the plan which expanded the scope due to stricter design requirements by UTA and Union Pacific. The revised project is estimated to cost between $3 billion and $5 billion.

== See also ==
- Buildings and sites of Salt Lake City
- National Register of Historic Places listings in Salt Lake City
- Yule marble
