= Colorado Eagle =

American streamlined passenger train

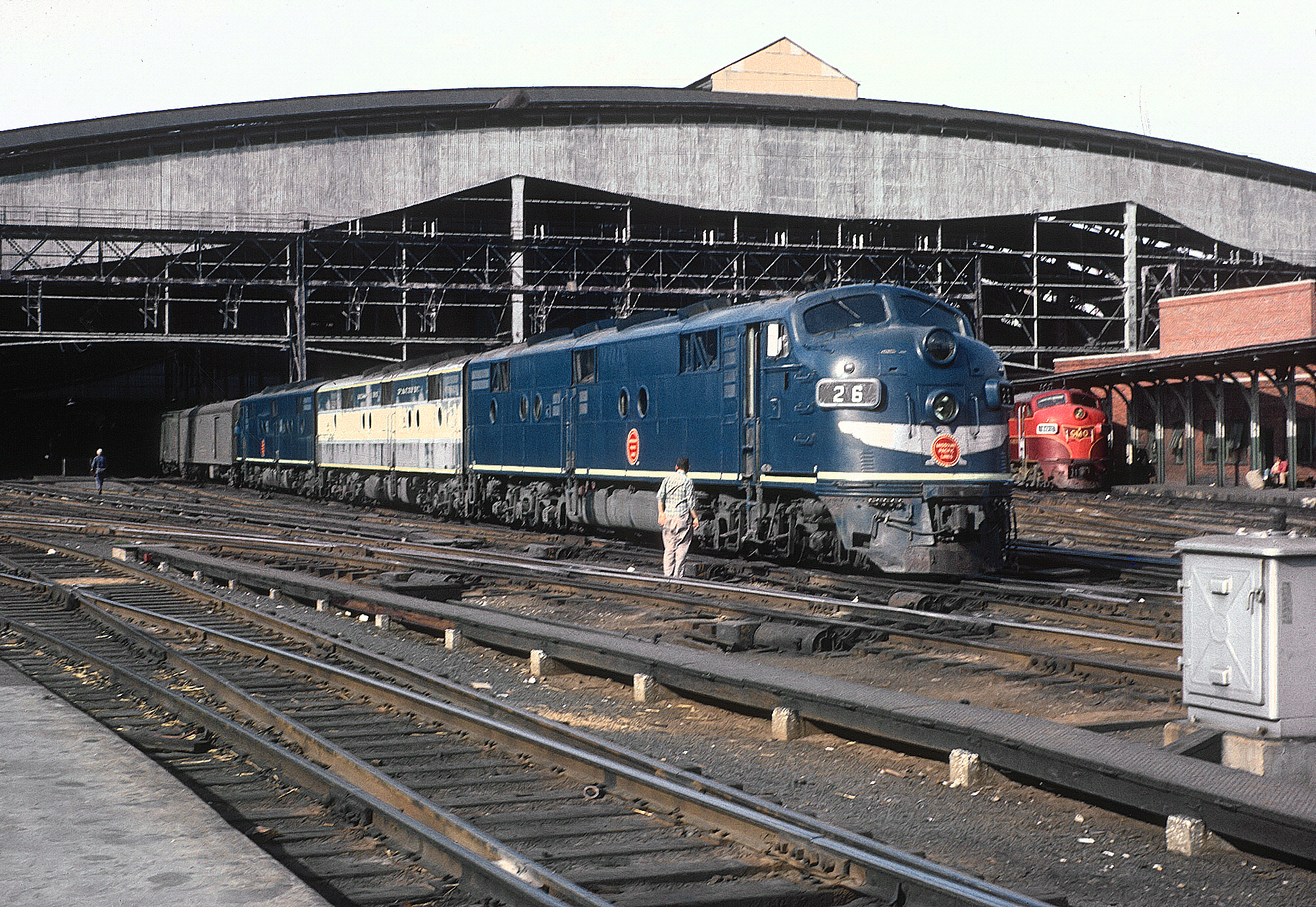
- Missouri Pacific E7A 26 with Train 11, The Colorado Eagle, waiting to depart St. Louis' Union Station on April 17, 1963

Overview
- Service type: Inter-city rail
- Status: Discontinued
- Locale: Western United States/Midwestern United States
- Predecessor: Scenic Limited
- First service: 1942
- Last service: 1964
- Former operator: Missouri Pacific / Denver and Rio Grande Western

Route
- Termini: St. Louis, Missouri; Denver, Colorado
- Distance travelled: 1,021.1 miles (1,643.3 km) (1957)
- Average journey time: Westbound: 18 hrs 50 min Eastbound: 19 hrs 15 min (1957)
- Service frequency: Daily
- Train numbers: Westbound: 11-4; Eastbound: 3-12

On-board services
- Seating arrangements: Reclining seat coaches
- Sleeping arrangements: Open sections in early years; Roomettes and Double Bedrooms
- Catering facilities: Diner-Bar-Lounge
- Observation facilities: Planetarium coach; Vista Dome Chair Car

Technical
- Track gauge: 4 ft 8 1/2 in (1,435 mm)

The Colorado Eagle was an American streamlined passenger train operated by the Missouri Pacific Railroad (MP) in the mid 20th century. It operated between St. Louis, Missouri and Denver, Colorado, using MP trackage from St. Louis to Pueblo, Colorado, and traveling on the Denver & Rio Grande Western Railroad from there to Denver. The train began service on June 21, 1942, and replaced those railroads' Scenic Limited.

The Colorado Special operated until March 1964, when the name as well as on-board amenities (save for a diner-parlor coach for the initial St. Louis - Kansas City segment of the trip) were dropped as the MP reduced passenger service across its system. On April 2, 1966, the MP canceled the remaining unnamed trains serving Denver, ending passenger service along the Colorado Eagle's route west of Kansas City.
