= Exposition Flyer =

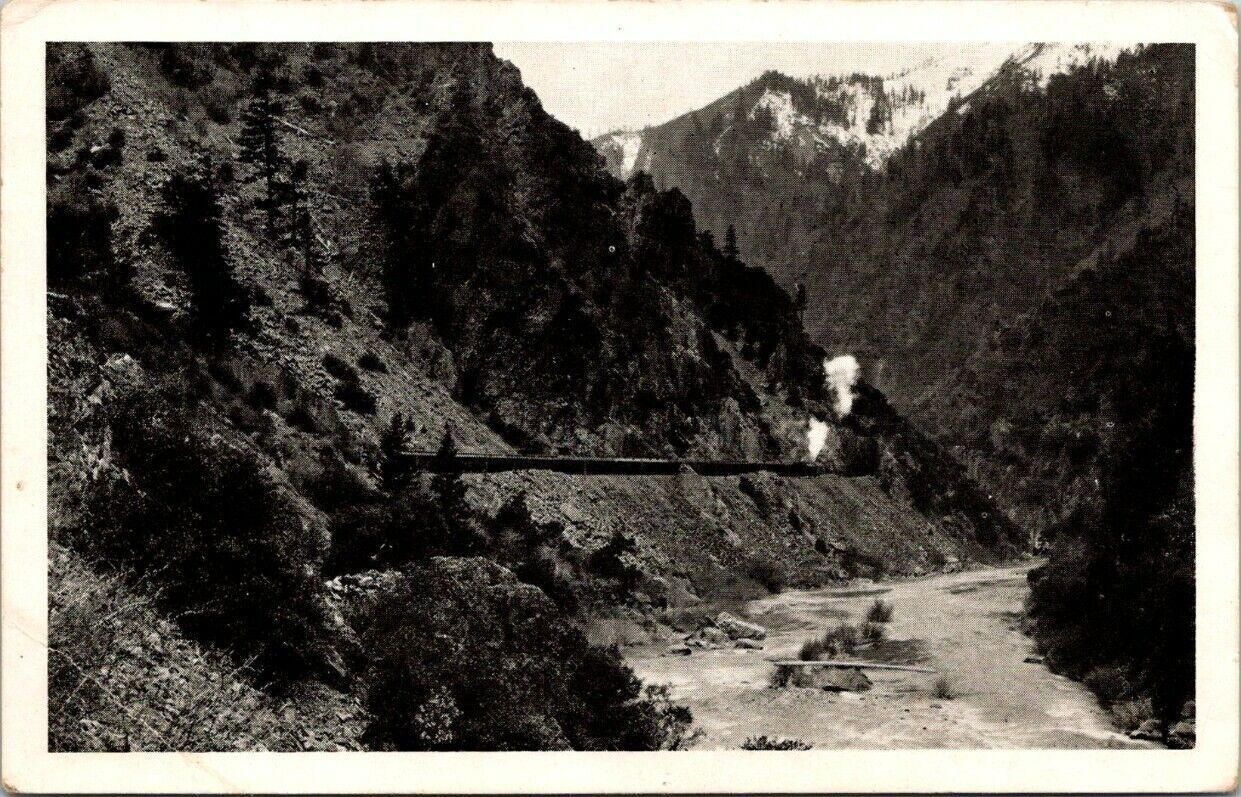
- The Exposition Flyer in the Feather River Canyon

Overview
- Service type: Inter-city rail
- Locale: Western United States
- First service: June 10, 1939
- Last service: 1949
- Successor: California Zephyr
- Former operators: Chicago, Burlington and Quincy Railroad; Denver and Rio Grande Western Railroad; Western Pacific Railroad

Route
- Termini: Chicago, Illinois; Oakland, California
- Distance travelled: 2,438 miles (3,924 km)
- Service frequency: Daily
- Train number: 39/40

The Exposition Flyer was a passenger train jointly operated by the Chicago, Burlington & Quincy (CB&Q), Denver & Rio Grande Western (D&RGW), and Western Pacific (WP) railroads between Chicago and Oakland, California, for a decade between 1939 and 1949, before being replaced by the famed California Zephyr.

== History ==
In 1939, the Golden Gate International Exposition opened on Treasure Island in San Francisco Bay. In response, the CB&Q, D&RGW and WP decided to operate a train that could take passengers to the event. Service on the Exposition Flyer began on June 10, 1939. In the beginning, the train used steam locomotives as motive power and consisted of the heavyweight Pullman standard cars. In later years, however, the train would operate using diesel power and in the final months of service, used streamlined passenger cars. Initially, the train was supposed to be a temporary route, although, due to the train's popularity, which made it a significant rival to the City of San Francisco, the Chicago-Oakland train operated jointly by the Chicago & Northwestern, Union Pacific and Southern Pacific, it remained in operation until 1949. In 1949, the CB&Q, D&RGW and WP replaced the Exposition Flyer with the all streamlined California Zephyr, which operated over the same route.

=== Accidents ===
- On the night of September 22, 1941, the eastbound Exposition Flyer collided head-on with a steam locomotive near Sunol, California. The steam locomotive engineer's watch was running slow, and he had failed to move his engine onto a siding. Three people, including the engineer and fireman on the Exposition Flyer, were killed.
- On April 3, 1946, the Exposition Flyer derailed in eastern Nevada after passing over a switch at 45 miles per hour (72 km/h), killing two passengers.
- On April 25, 1946, the Exposition Flyer was involved in its deadliest accident. The westbound Advance Flyer, another train operated by the CB&Q, made an emergency stop in the Chicago suburb of Naperville, Illinois just short of the CB&Q depot. The Exposition Flyer, travelling at around 85 miles per hour (137 km/h) a short distance behind on the same track, rear-ended the Advance Flyer. 45 people were killed in the Naperville train disaster, including the Exposition Flyer's fireman.

== Route ==
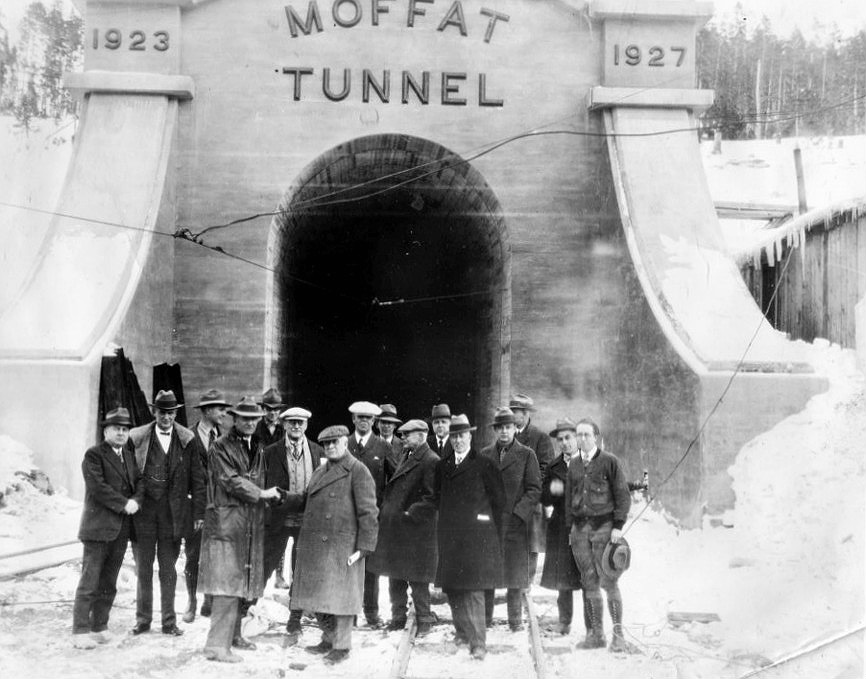
Burlington officials at the Moffat Tunnel in 1934 as plans were being made to create the Exposition Flyer, the first transcontinental train to use the tunnel

The Exposition Flyer operated over the CB&Q between Chicago and Denver, the D&RGW between Denver and Salt Lake City, and the WP between Salt Lake City and Oakland. The westbound train left Chicago Union Station at 12:35 pm, and after traversing Illinois, the train crossed the Mississippi River at Burlington, Iowa, continuing through southern Iowa to Denver via Omaha and Lincoln, Nebraska. The train made use of the 6.5 mi (10.5 km)-long Moffat Tunnel, and was the first through passenger train to make use of the Dotsero Cutoff, as opposed to the former route via Colorado Springs, Pueblo and the Royal Gorge. After traveling through northern Nevada, the Exposition Flyer traveled through Feather River Canyon, although only those on the westbound Exposition Flyer were able to see the canyon during daylight hours. The train would finally arrive in San Francisco (Oakland with ferry connection to SF) at 10:30 pm two days later. The eastbound Exposition Flyer left San Francisco at 9 pm and arrived in Chicago at 11:55 pm two days later.

Some of the route was shared by the Missouri Pacific Railroad's Scenic Limited, which ran between Kansas City and San Francisco. Beginning in 1946, a through Pullman car to and from New York City was introduced, allowing passengers an uninterrupted coast-to-coast journey via trains operated by the New York Central Railroad and Pennsylvania Railroad on alternating days.
