= Thompson Wash Rock Art District =

Rock art site near Thompson Springs, Utah

- U.S. National Register of Historic Places
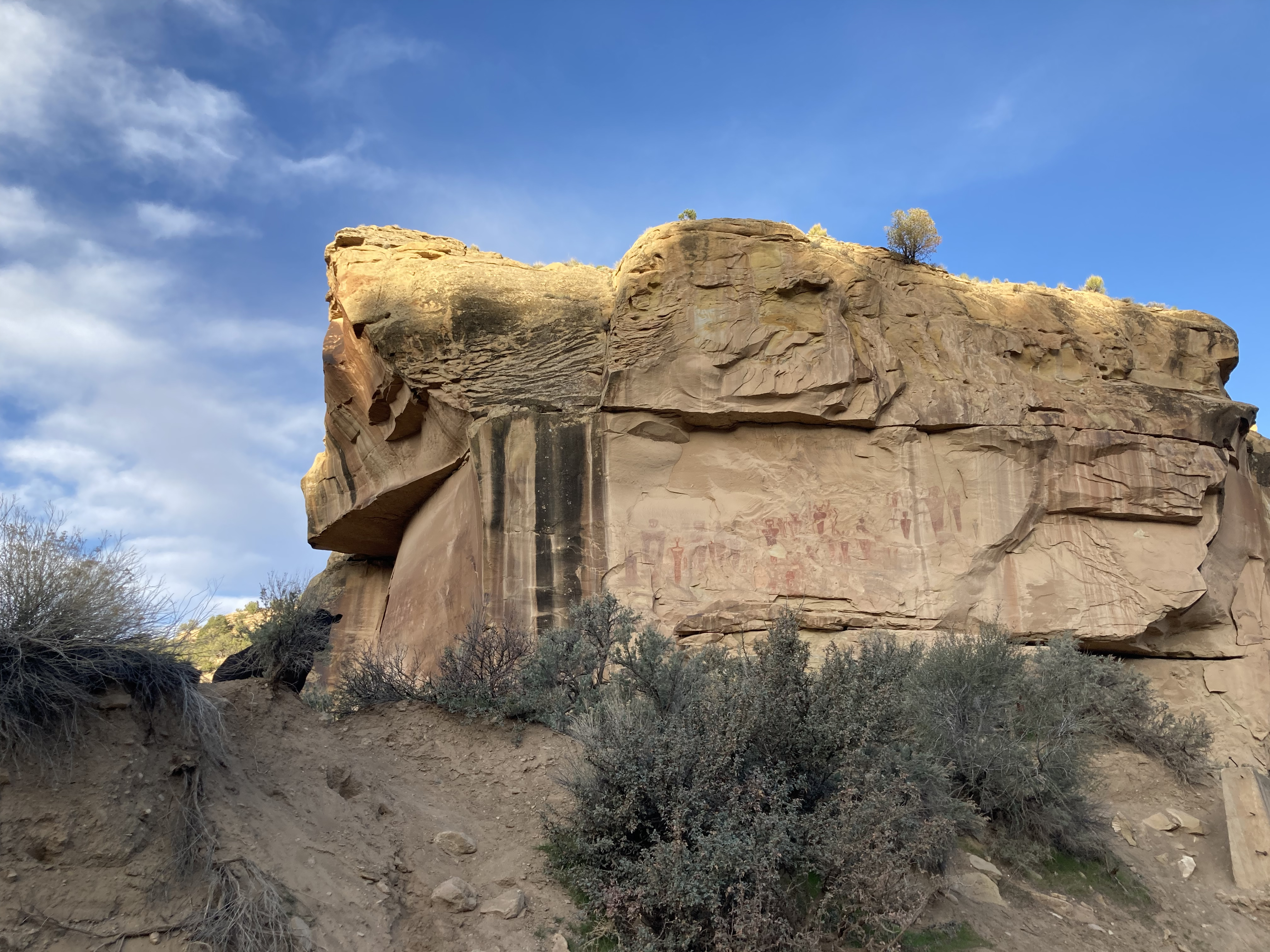
- The largest panel

- Location within Utah Location within the United States
- Location: Sego, Grand County, Utah, United States
- Nearest city: Thompson Springs, Utah
- Coordinates: 39.003616°N 109.705611°W
- NRHP reference No.: 80003909
- Added to NRHP: August 1, 1980

The Thompson Wash Rock Art District, known by the Bureau of Land Management as the Sego Canyon Rock Art Interpretive Site, is a rock art site in Grand County, Utah, north of the town of Thompson Springs. It contains art from three different cultures: the Fremont, the Ute, and the Barrier Canyon Style.

It has been listed on the National Register of Historic Places since August 1, 1980.

== History ==
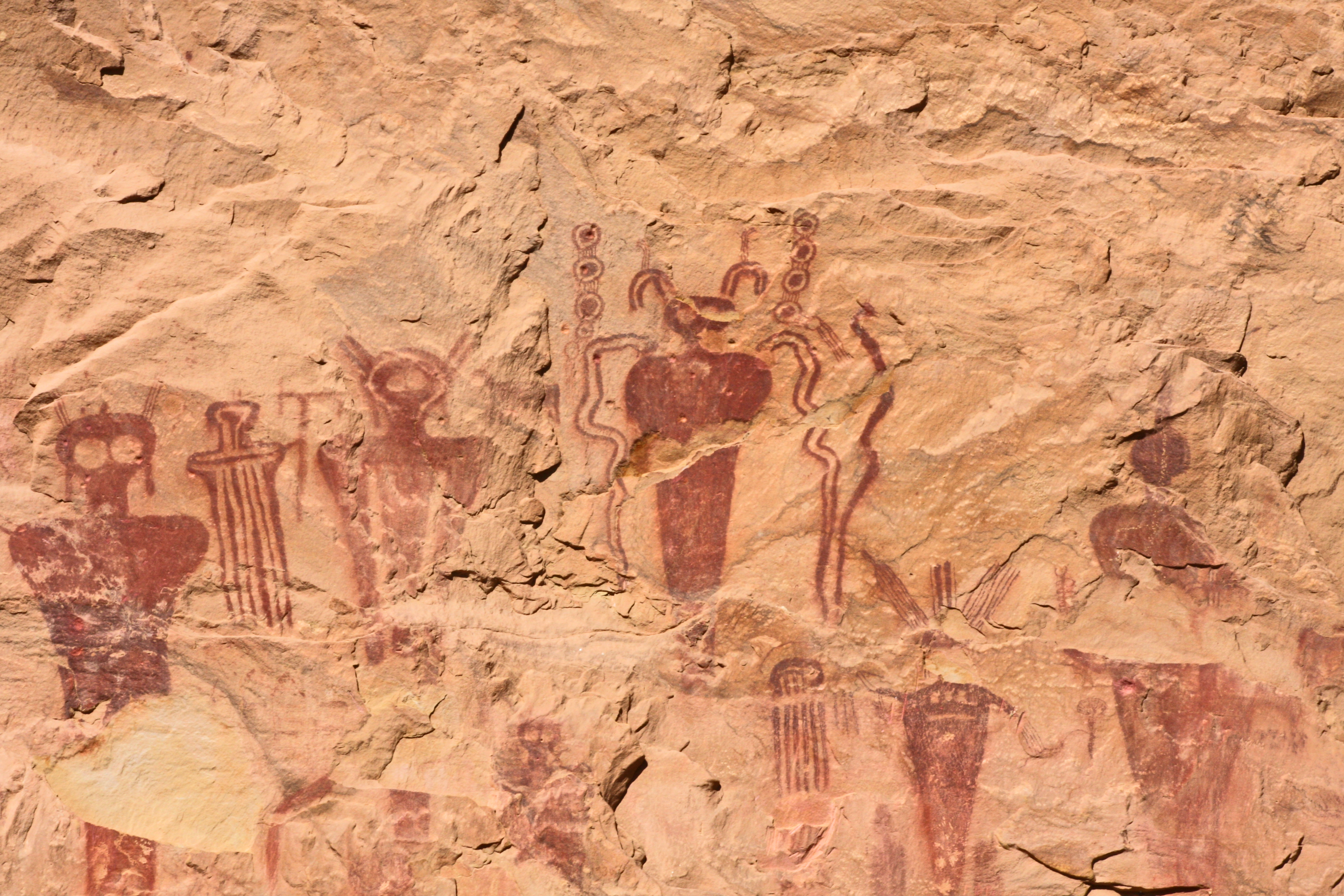
A closer look at the petroglyphs, this one of the Barrier Canyon Style

The Barrier Canyon Style petroglyphs are the oldest, dating to 2000 BC, while the most recent is the Ute, ranging from the 14th to 17th centuries.

== Panels ==
The Ute's art shows people with shields, horses, and buffalo. It has been vandalized. The Fremont panel describes large humans, a hunter, and bighorn sheep. Geometric designs also appear, with this panel being similar to ones found in Ninemile Canyon. Finally, the Barrier Style glyphs show small and large humanoid shapes, with the large ones having an appearance similar to a mummy. They do not have arms or legs and possess large eyes and skull-like heads, similar to the ones found in Horseshoe Canyon.
