= Ruby Canyon =

Canyon in Colorado and Utah, United States

Coordinates: 39°07′03″N 109°04′15″W

Rock formations in Ruby Canyon, as seen from the California Zephyr

Ruby Canyon is a roughly 25 mi (40 km) canyon on the Colorado River located on the border of Colorado and Utah in the western United States, and is a popular destination for rafting and overnight camping (permits required). The canyon takes its name from the ruby-red sandstone cliffs that line its walls.

The only access to the canyon outside of rafting is provided by the Union Pacific Railroad (formerly Denver and Rio Grande Western Railroad) between Mack, Colorado and Westwater, Utah. Amtrak's California Zephyr follows this route through Ruby Canyon between Grand Junction, Colorado, and Thompson Springs, Utah. A popular attraction along the route is the words "Utah | Colorado" painted on the canyon wall at the border between the two states next to the Utaline Siding.
