= 2008 United States presidential election in Utah =

- November 4, 2008

Nominee	John McCain	Barack Obama
Party	Republican	Democratic
Home state	Arizona	Illinois
Running mate	Sarah Palin	Joe Biden
Electoral vote	5	0
Popular vote	596,030	327,670
Percentage	62.58%	34.41%

McCain
50–60%
60–70%
70–80%
80–90%
Obama
40–50%
50–60%
President before election
George W. Bush
Republican
Elected President
Barack Obama
Democratic

The 2008 United States presidential election in Utah took place on November 4, 2008. It was part of the 2008 United States presidential election. Voters chose five representatives, or electors to the Electoral College, who voted for president and vice president.

Utah was won by Republican nominee John McCain by a 28% margin of victory. Prior to the election, all leading news organizations considered this a state McCain would win, or otherwise considered as a safe red state. Highlighting its status as a GOP bastion, Utah gave McCain one of his largest victories over Democrat Barack Obama, a near two-to-one margin. Obama did nevertheless manage to carry three counties, and significantly improved upon John Kerry's performance in 2004.

== Primaries ==
- 2008 Utah Democratic presidential primary
- 2008 Utah Republican presidential primary

== Campaign ==
=== Predictions ===
There were 16 news organizations who made state-by-state predictions of the election. Here are their last predictions before election day:

Source	Ranking
D.C. Political Report	Likely R
Cook Political Report	Solid R
The Takeaway	Solid R
Electoral-vote.com	Solid R
The Washington Post	Solid R
Politico	Solid R
RealClearPolitics	Solid R
FiveThirtyEight	Solid R
CQ Politics	Solid R
The New York Times	Solid R
CNN	Safe R
NPR	Solid R
MSNBC	Solid R
Fox News	Likely R
Associated Press	Likely R
Rasmussen Reports	Safe R

=== Polling ===
McCain won every pre-election poll conducted in this state, each with a double-digit margin and with at least 55% of the vote. The final three-poll average showed McCain leading 59% to 31%.

=== Fundraising ===
John McCain raised a total of $1,165,621 in the state. Barack Obama raised $2,121,563.

=== Advertising and visits ===
Obama spent $297,645. McCain spent just $250. Neither campaign visited the state.

== Analysis ==
Utah is a heavily Republican state that has not voted for a Democratic presidential nominee since Lyndon B. Johnson's landslide in 1964, and even then the state voted considerably to the right of the nation. Johnson is also the last Democrat to manage even 40 percent of Utah's popular vote. The majority of the state's population is Mormon and highly conservative, especially on social issues. Utah gave George W. Bush his largest margin of victory in 2004 over John Kerry, as Bush received over 71 percent to Kerry's 26 percent and carried every county in the state.

With 62.15 percent of the popular vote, Utah proved to be McCain's third strongest state in the 2008 election after Oklahoma and neighboring Wyoming.

Although McCain easily won Utah in 2008, Obama did very well for a Democrat in this Republican stronghold. Obama was able to reduce McCain's margin of victory by narrowly winning Salt Lake County, the state's most populous county that contains the state capital of Salt Lake City, by a mere 296 votes–the first time a Democrat had carried that county since 1964. Obama also carried Summit and Grand counties, both of which have significantly lower Mormon populations than the rest of the state. Nonetheless, Obama became the first Democrat to win the White House without carrying Carbon County since Woodrow Wilson in 1912.

This election was the Democratic presidential nominee's best showing in Utah since 1968. In substantially Native American and non-Mormon – but historically heavily Republican – San Juan County, Obama's performance was the best by a Democratic presidential candidate since Franklin D. Roosevelt in 1940.

During the same election, popular incumbent Republican Governor Jon Huntsman Jr. was reelected to a second term in a massive landslide victory, taking in 77.74 percent of the vote over Democrat Bob Springmeyer's 19.65 percent and Libertarian Dell Schanze's 2.62 percent. At the state level, however, Democrats did manage to pick up two seats in the Utah House of Representatives.

== Results ==
2008 United States presidential election in Utah
Party	Candidate	Running mate	Votes	Percentage	Electoral votes
Republican	John McCain	Sarah Palin	596,030	62.58%	5
Democratic	Barack Obama	Joe Biden	327,670	34.41%	0
Constitution	Chuck Baldwin	Darrell Castle	12,012	1.26%	0
Peace and Freedom	Ralph Nader	Matt Gonzalez	8,416	0.88%	0
Libertarian	Bob Barr	Wayne Allyn Root	6,966	0.73%	0
Green	Cynthia McKinney	Rosa Clemente	982	0.10%	0
Others	Others		293	0.03%	0
Totals			952,370	100.00%	5
Voter turnout (Voting age population)					55.5%

=== By county ===
County	John McCain Republican		Barack Obama Democratic		Charles Baldwin Constitution		Ralph Nader Peace and Freedom		Bob Barr Libertarian		Various candidates Other parties		Margin		Total votes cast
County	#	%	#	%	#	%	#	%	#	%	#	%	#	%	Total votes cast
Beaver	1,902	75.54%	542	21.53%	30	1.19%	21	0.83%	12	0.48%	11	0.44%	1,360	54.01%	2,518
Box Elder	15,228	79.24%	3,311	17.23%	221	1.15%	147	0.76%	127	0.66%	183	0.95%	11,917	62.01%	19,217
Cache	29,127	69.48%	10,294	24.56%	1,153	2.75%	315	0.75%	372	0.89%	661	1.58%	18,833	44.92%	41,922
Carbon	4,091	52.30%	3,468	44.34%	62	0.79%	90	1.15%	48	0.61%	63	0.81%	623	7.96%	7,822
Daggett	297	66.89%	131	29.50%	2	0.45%	8	1.80%	1	0.23%	5	1.13%	166	37.39%	444
Davis	77,341	69.74%	30,477	27.48%	1,175	1.06%	956	0.86%	811	0.73%	142	0.13%	46,864	42.26%	110,902
Duchesne	4,689	81.24%	911	15.78%	66	1.14%	27	0.47%	37	0.64%	42	0.73%	3,778	65.46%	5,772
Emery	3,358	75.02%	973	21.74%	43	0.96%	39	0.87%	26	0.58%	37	0.83%	2,385	53.28%	4,476
Garfield	1,710	78.37%	405	18.56%	16	0.73%	11	0.50%	11	0.50%	29	1.32%	1,305	59.81%	2,182
Grand	1,871	45.65%	2,067	50.43%	28	0.68%	56	1.37%	30	0.73%	47	1.05%	-196	-4.78%	4,099
Iron	12,518	75.06%	3,258	19.53%	352	2.11%	138	0.83%	163	0.98%	249	1.50%	9,260	55.53%	16,678
Juab	2,683	73.19%	741	20.21%	129	3.52%	30	0.82%	28	0.76%	55	1.50%	1,942	52.98%	3,666
Kane	2,212	69.65%	856	26.95%	27	0.85%	31	0.98%	24	0.76%	26	0.82%	1,356	42.70%	3,176
Millard	3,653	77.08%	758	15.99%	264	5.57%	27	0.57%	34	0.72%	3	0.06%	2,895	61.09%	4,739
Morgan	3,311	79.06%	689	16.45%	102	2.44%	28	0.67%	29	0.69%	29	0.69%	2,622	62.61%	4,188
Piute	635	79.28%	141	17.60%	13	1.62%	7	0.87%	2	0.25%	3	0.37%	494	61.68%	801
Rich	831	82.36%	154	15.26%	9	0.89%	5	0.50%	5	0.50%	5	0.50%	677	67.10%	1,009
Salt Lake	176,692	48.09%	176,988	48.17%	3,229	0.88%	3,768	1.03%	2,556	0.70%	4,211	1.15%	-296	-0.08%	367,444
San Juan	2,638	51.42%	2,406	46.90%	45	0.88%	25	0.49%	14	0.27%	2	0.04%	232	4.52%	5,130
Sanpete	6,664	75.06%	1,631	18.37%	324	3.65%	87	0.98%	54	0.61%	118	1.33%	5,033	56.69%	8,878
Sevier	6,394	79.35%	1,359	16.87%	131	1.63%	52	0.65%	53	0.66%	69	0.85%	5,035	62.48%	8,058
Summit	6,956	41.11%	9,532	56.34%	75	0.44%	126	0.74%	104	0.61%	127	0.75%	-2,576	-15.23%	16,920
Tooele	10,998	62.98%	5,830	33.38%	206	1.18%	151	0.86%	137	0.78%	141	0.81%	5,168	29.60%	17,463
Uintah	8,441	82.84%	1,462	14.35%	157	1.54%	45	0.44%	37	0.36%	47	0.46%	6,979	68.49%	10,189
Utah	122,224	77.71%	29,567	18.80%	2,877	1.83%	1,119	0.71%	1,311	0.83%	181	0.12%	92,657	58.91%	157,279
Wasatch	5,430	62.96%	2,892	33.53%	81	0.94%	86	1.00%	30	0.35%	106	1.23%	2,538	29.43%	8,625
Washington	37,311	74.57%	10,826	21.64%	628	1.26%	312	0.62%	413	0.83%	545	1.09%	26,485	52.93%	50,035
Wayne	940	70.04%	335	24.96%	10	0.75%	12	0.89%	12	0.89%	33	2.46%	605	45.08%	1,342
Weber	45,885	61.99%	25,666	34.67%	557	0.75%	697	0.94%	485	0.66%	732	0.99%	20,219	27.32%	74,022
Totals	596,030	62.15%	327,670	34.17%	12,012	1.25%	8,416	0.88%	6,966	0.73%	7,902	0.82%	268,360	27.98%	958,996

Counties that flipped from Republican to Democratic

- Grand (largest municipality: Moab)
- Salt Lake (largest city: Salt Lake City)
- Summit (largest city: Park City)

=== By congressional district ===
McCain won all three of the state's congressional districts, including one held by a Democrat.

District	McCain	Obama	Representative
1st	63.62%	33.42%	Rob Bishop
2nd	57.72%	39.55%	Jim Matheson
3rd	67.35%	29.25%	Chris Cannon (110th Congress)
3rd	67.35%	29.25%	Jason Chaffetz (111th Congress)

== Electors ==
Technically the voters of Utah cast their ballots for electors: representatives to the Electoral College. Utah is allocated 5 electors because it has 3 congressional districts and 2 senators. All candidates who appear on the ballot or qualify to receive write-in votes must submit a list of 5 electors, who pledge to vote for their candidate and their running mate. Whoever wins the majority of votes in the state is awarded all 5 electoral votes. Their chosen electors then vote for president and vice president. Although electors are pledged to their candidate and running mate, they are not obligated to vote for them. An elector who votes for someone other than their candidate is known as a faithless elector.

The electors of each state and the District of Columbia met on December 15, 2008, to cast their votes for president and vice president. The Electoral College itself never meets as one body. Instead the electors from each state and the District of Columbia met in their respective capitols.

The following were the members of the Electoral College from the state. All 5 were pledged to John McCain and Sarah Palin:

1. Scott Simpson
2. Richard Snelgrove
3. Stan Lockhart
4. Enid Greene-Mickelesen
5. Mark Shurtleff

== See also ==
- United States presidential elections in Utah
- Presidency of Barack Obama
