= Westwater =

Westwater may refer to:

- Westwater, Utah, a small Navajo Nation-owned community in San Juan County
- Westwater Canyon on the Colorado River in Eastern Utah
- Westwater Reservoir, Scotland
