= Castleton, Utah =

- Ghost town
- Location within Utah Location within the United States
- Coordinates: 38°36′12″N 109°19′4″W
- Country: United States
- State: Utah
- County: Grand
- Established: c. 1880
- Vacated: 1967
- Elevation: 5,896 ft (1,797 m)
- GNIS feature ID: 1439525

Castleton is a ghost town in the Castle Valley in southeastern Grand County, Utah, United States.

== Description ==
The community located on the La Sal Mountain Loop Road, some 18 miles (29 km) northeast of Moab. The nearest inhabited town is Castle Valley, approximately 6 miles (9.7 km) to the northwest.

== History ==
A short-lived gold placer mining camp existed here in the 1860s, but the area was first settled by a prospector named Doby Brown in the late 1870s or early 1880s. By 1882 enough settlers had gathered to establish a post office. In 1888 when a local gold rush began at nearby Miners Basin, Castleton became important as a supply town. It had a general store, hotel, two saloons, and several other businesses. At its peak in 1895, the population exceeded that of Moab. In fact, when Grand County was organized in 1890, Castleton vied with Moab for the chance to be county seat.

The Panic of 1907 closed down the area's mines, and soon ranchers were Castleton's only residents. By 1910 the businesses were gone, leaving only the post office, and the population had dropped to 50. In 1930 there were six residents. A few people stayed in the dead town for decades, but in 1967 the county commission officially vacated Castleton as an occupied town.

== Climate ==
According to the Köppen Climate Classification system, Castleton has a semi-arid climate, abbreviated "BSk" on climate maps.

== See also ==
- List of ghost towns in Utah
