= Greentown Gas Condensate Field =

Oil field in Utah, USA

Coordinates: 37.46°N 109.14°W

Greentown Oil and Gas Field is located in Grand County, approximately 26 miles (42 km) southwest of the city of Green River, Utah.

Production is from the Clastic zones within the Paradox salt section.

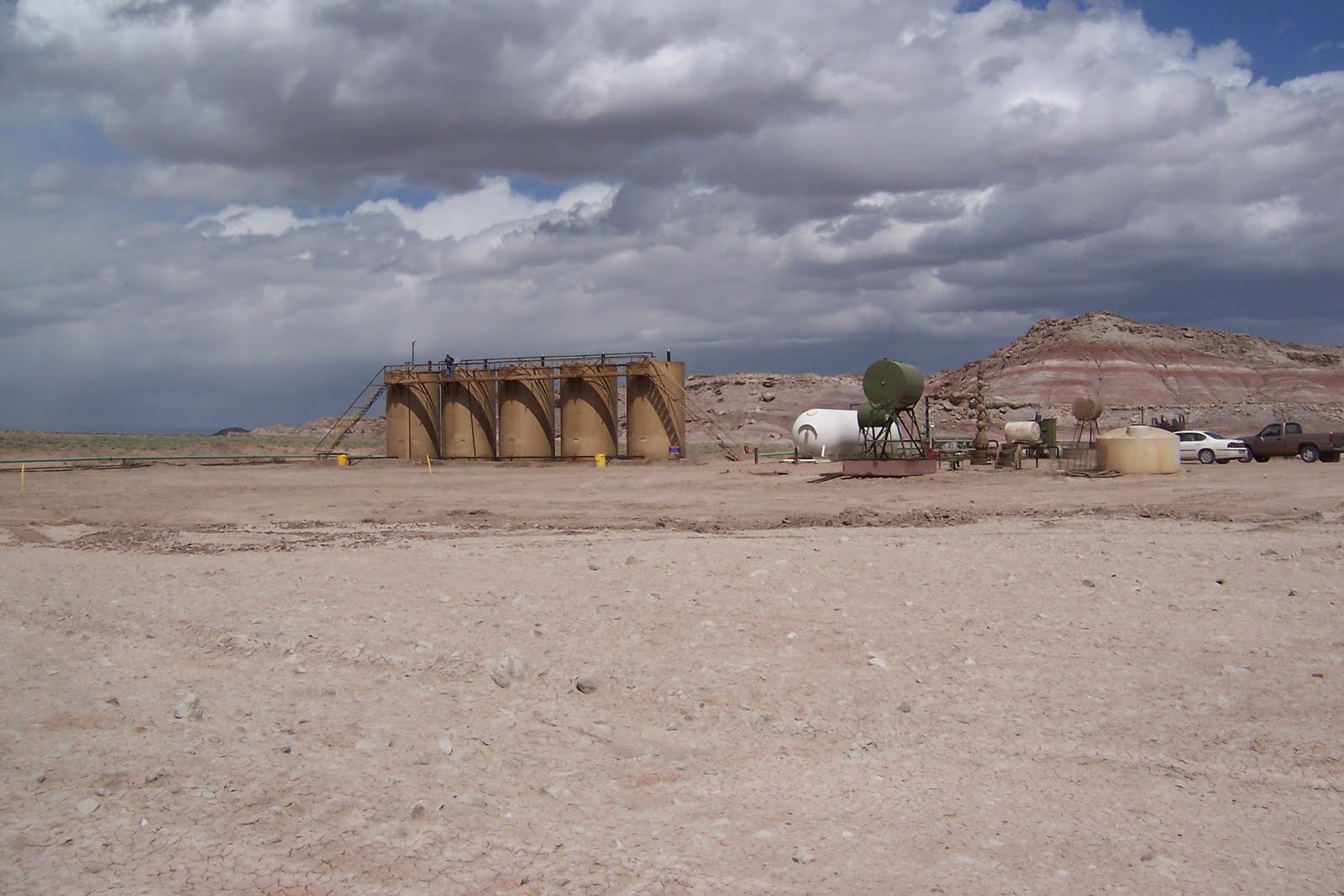
Federal 28-11

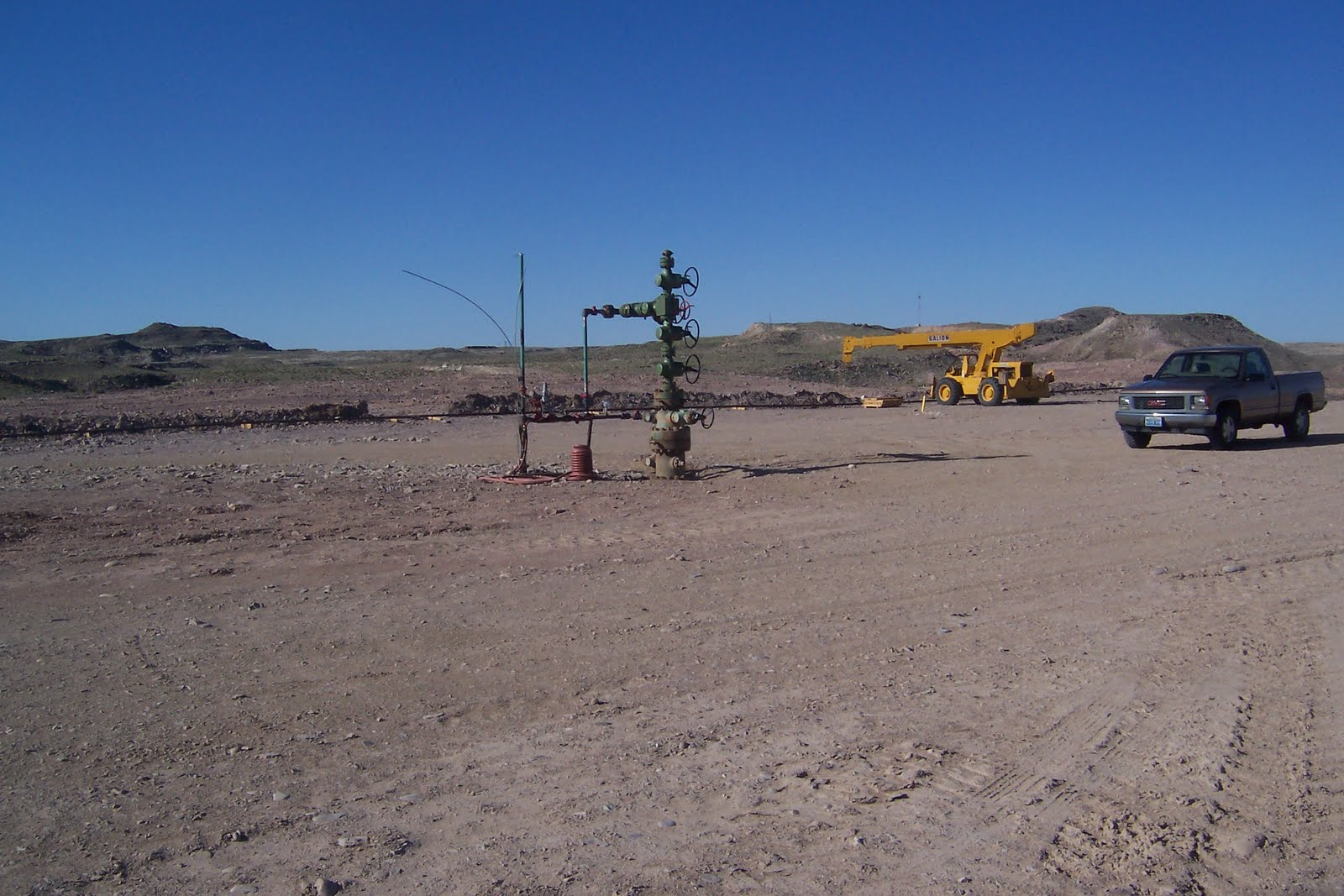
Federal 26-43H

Reservoir consists of sand sections within the salt sections, the reservoir covers approximately 43,000 acres.

== Discovery ==
The field was discovered in 2005 by Delta Petroleum Corporation, with the drilling of the State 36-11 well approximately 2 miles south of the town of Green River, Utah. The well tested at 25 million cubic feet of natural gas per day and over 2,000 bbls of condensate per day. The well had an initial tubing pressure of over 8000 psi. The field was discovered using seismic and surface geology.

Greentown field was unitized in 2013 as an exploration unit; the initial obligation well, the Greentown 32-421A, was spudded on December 6, 2013, and is to be completed by April 2014.

== Geology ==
The field is composed of a numerous sand reservoirs bounded by Anhydrite and Salt section. The reservoirs are continuous over 43,000 acres and have low permeability and steeply dipping beds. The field was delineated by drilling of 9 wells during 2005 through 2008.

Greentown unit was formed in 2012 and the first Greentown well commenced drilling in December 2012.

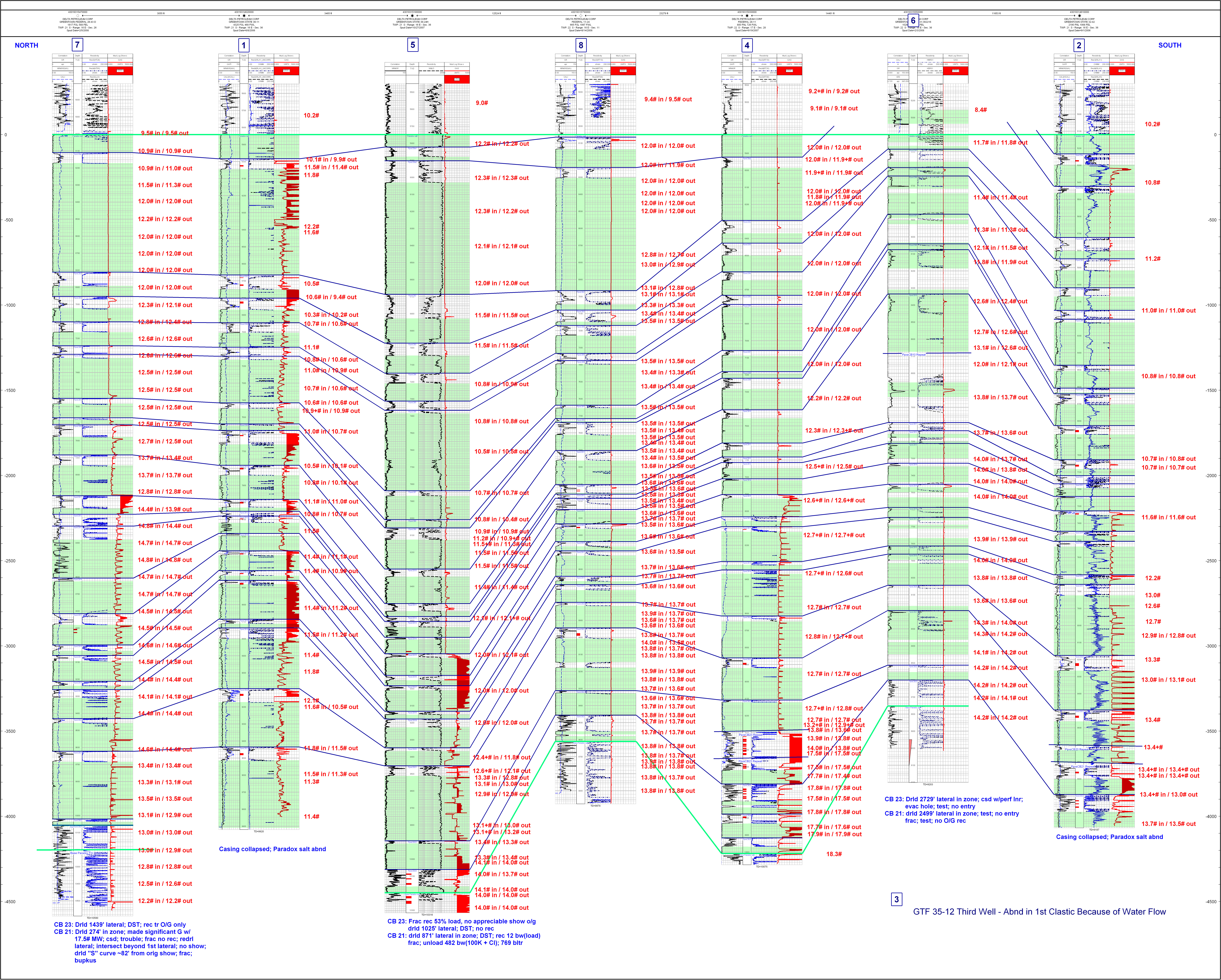
Greentown Crosssection

Regional setting: Northwest Paradox Basin

Producing formation(s): Pennsylvanian clastics sections of the Paradox Formation at approximately 9,500 feet depth

Type of trap: Anticline

== Condensate and gas composition ==
Condensate produced has the following composition:

- 52.4 – API gravity
- Pour poinit – 15 degree F.
- Color – clear
- Sulfur content – low

NGL – 600 gallons NGL per million cubic feet of natural gas.

== Production ==
Natural gas production from the field is transported by pipeline to a central processing facility where it is processed for gas quality control by removing Propane, thereafter it is transported through a 16-inch pipeline to Moab, Utah where it purchased by Northwest Pipeline Company.

Gas condensate is transported by trucks to refineries in Salt Lake City, Utah.

== Natural gas composition ==
- BTU – 1340 to 1470
- Specific gravity – 0.496

== Reserves ==
Preliminary reserve estimates are that the field contains approximately 200 million barrels of condensate and over 2 TCF of Natural. These reserves are not proven but indicated.

Additional studies by the Utah Department of Geology has encouraged the drilling of horizontal wells to efficiently drain the reservoir.

Paradox Basin. Final Report US Department of Energy
