= Grand County, Utah =

County in Utah, United States

- County
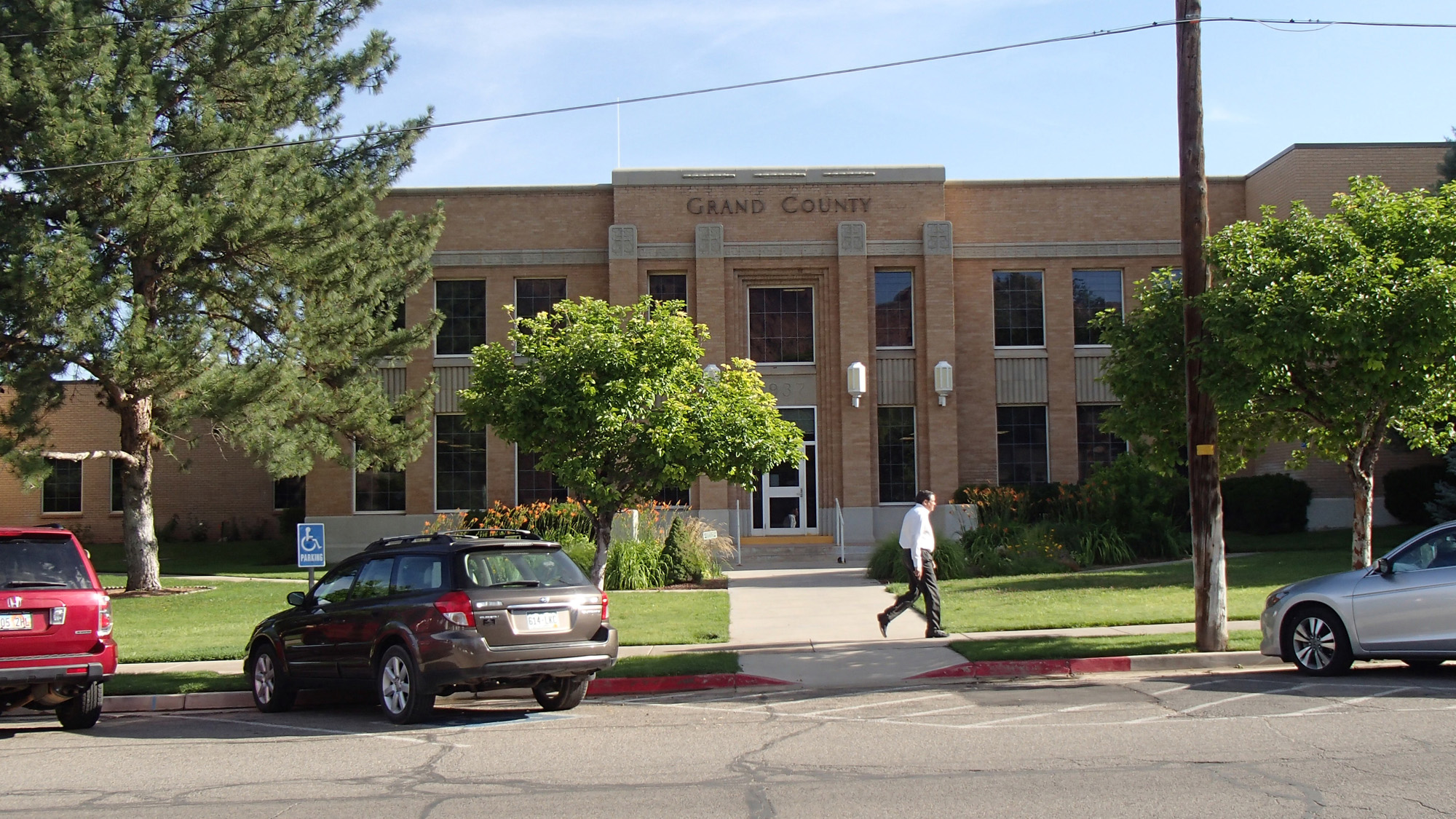
- Grand County Courthouse, June 2014

- Seal

- Location within the U.S. state of Utah
- Coordinates: 38.99°N 109.56°W
- Country: United States
- State: Utah
- Founded: March 13, 1890
- Named for: Grand River (now the Colorado River)
- Seat: Moab
- Largest city: Moab

Area
  - Total: 3,684 sq mi (9,540 km^{2})
  - Land: 3,672 sq mi (9,510 km^{2})
  - Water: 12 sq mi (31 km^{2}) 0.3%

Population (2020)
  - Total: 9,669
  - Estimate (2025): 9,790 ▲
  - Density: 2.633/sq mi (1.017/km^{2})
- Time zone: UTC−7 (Mountain)
  - Summer (DST): UTC−6 (MDT)
- Congressional district: 3rd
- Website: www.grandcountyutah.net

Grand County is a county on the east central edge of the U.S. state of Utah, United States. As of the 2020 United States census, the population was 9,669. Its county seat and largest city is Moab.

Grand County is home to one of the nine statewide regional campuses of Utah State University (located in the city of Moab) and serves as a gateway to both Arches and Canyonlands National Parks.

== History ==
Evidence of indigenous occupation up to 10,000 BCE has been previously discovered in Grand County. The present city of Moab is the site of pueblo farming communities of the 11th and 12th centuries. These groups had already vanished from the area when the first European explorers entered the country, with nomadic Ute tribes inhabiting the area at the time of contact.

The European-based settlement of the area began with the arrival of Mormon pioneers in 1847. By 1855 they had sent missionary settlers into eastern Utah Territory. An Elk Mountain Mission was established but closed after a few months due to Indian raids. For several decades after that, the future Moab area (known as "Spanish Valley") was visited only by trappers and prospectors. Permanent settlement began in 1877. These early settlers, coming in from the north, encountered the deep canyon walls of the Grand River and could not take wagons over or around the steep canyon walls.

They unloaded their supplies, dismantled the wagons, and lowered them by rope to the river valley. They then drove their oxen over a canyon rim, down deep sand dunes. After the wagons were reassembled and supplies reloaded, they made their way through the deep sand to the river. They found a place to ford the river below the present bridge in north Moab. They later established a ferry at the crossing site, which remained in use until the first bridge was built in 1921.

In 1881 the area was known as Grand Valley, and Moab was a "wild west" town. A 1991 visitor to Moab later said it was the toughest town in Utah because the area and surrounding country have many deep canyons, rivers, mountains, and wilderness areas, becoming a hideout for outlaws. The local economy was initially based on farming and livestock. Mining came in at the end of the 19th century, and the railroad arrived. The first school in the county was started in 1881. Mormon settlers began planting fruit trees by 1879, and by 1910 Moab was a significant fruit-production center.

Due to the distances involved, the settlers of eastern Emery County found it difficult to conduct county business in that county's seat. By March 13, 1890, their petitions caused the Utah Territory legislature to designate the eastern portion of the county as a separate entity, to be named Grand County, named for the Grand River (whose name was changed to Colorado River in 1921). The county boundaries were adjusted in 1892 and in 2003.

Exploration for deep petroleum deposits began in the 1920s, and this industry has significantly contributed to the economy since that time. Other significant industries include uranium mining and filmmaking.

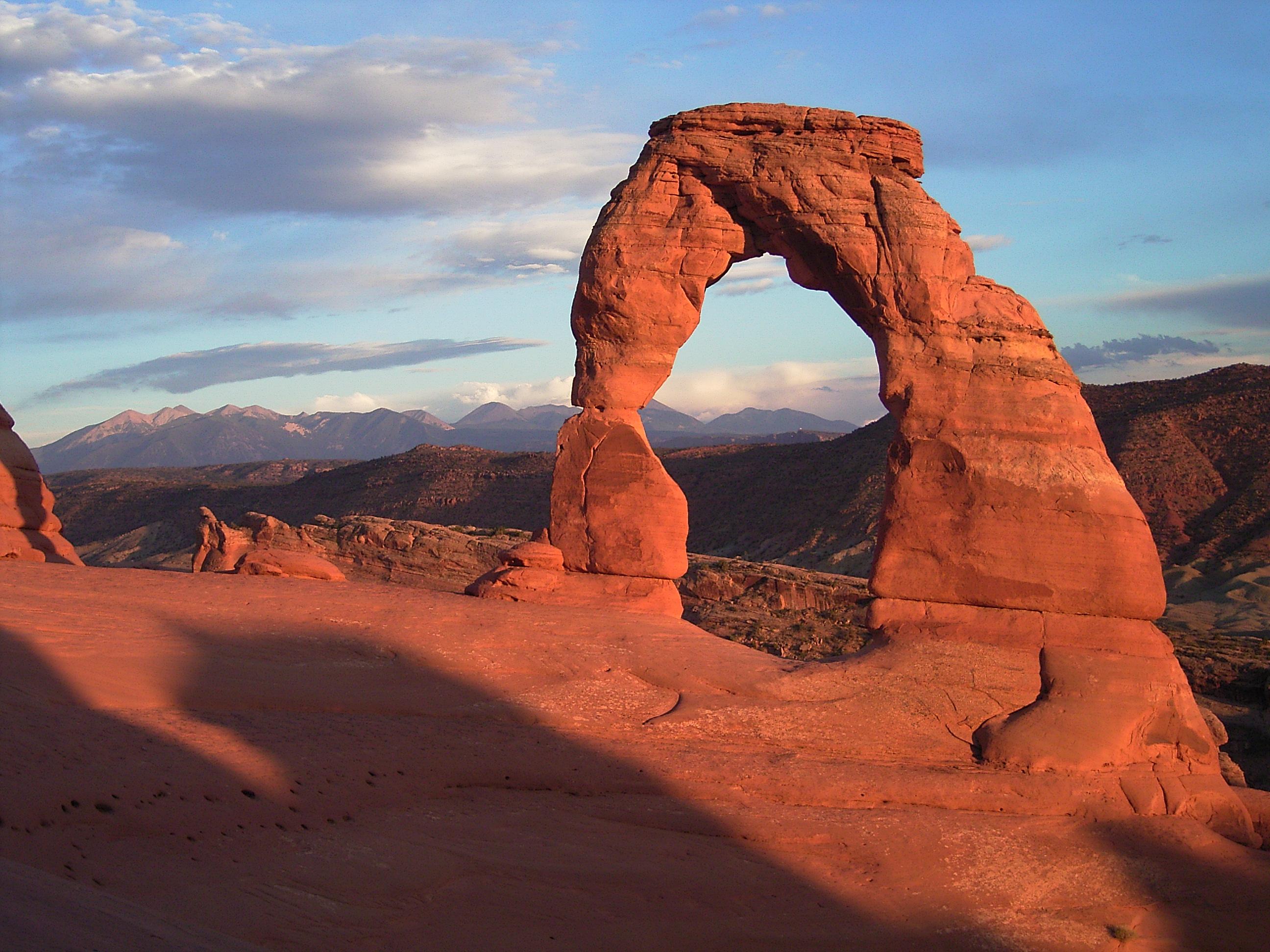
Delicate Arch, one of the most famous arches in Arches National Park

== Geography ==
Grand County lies on the east side of Utah. Its east border abuts the west border of the state of Colorado. The Green River flows southward through the eastern part of central Utah, and its meandering course defines the western border of Grand County. The Colorado River enters the east side of Grand County from Colorado, flowing southwestward toward its confluence with the Green in San Juan County, south of Grand. The Dolores River also enters Grand County from Colorado, flowing westward to its confluence with the Colorado River near Dewey.

Grand County terrain is arid, rough, and spectacularly carved by water and wind erosion, exposing red rock formations that have created a solid tourist industry. The area is little used for agriculture unless irrigation is available. The terrain is filled with hills and protuberances, but generally slopes to the south and to the west. Its highest point is Mount Waas in the SE part of the county, at 12,336 ft (3,760 m) ASL. The county has a total area of 3,684 square miles (9,540 km^{2}), of which 3,672 square miles (9,510 km^{2}) is land and 12 square miles (31 km^{2}) (0.3%) is water. Deserts, cliffs and plateaus make up the scenery, with few settlements apart from the city of Moab, a Colorado River oasis. Arches National Park lies in the southern part of the county, just north of Moab. A northern portion of Canyonlands National Park lies in the southwest corner of the county.

=== Airport ===
- Canyonlands Field (CNY) northwest of Moab

=== Major highways ===
- Interstate 70
- U.S. Route 191
- Utah State Route 128
- Utah State Route 313

=== Adjacent counties ===
- Uintah County - north
- Garfield County, Colorado - northeast
- Mesa County, Colorado - east
- Montrose County, Colorado - southeast
- San Juan County - south
- Emery County - west
- Carbon County - northwest

=== Protected areas ===
- Arches National Park
- Canyonlands National Park (part)
- Dead Horse Point State Park (part)
- Manti-La Sal National Forest (part)
- McInnis Canyons National Conservation Area (part)

=== Lakes and reservoirs ===
- Beaver Pond
- Big Flat Reservoir
- Blue Flat Reservoir
- Crescent Wash Reservoir
- Dead Sheep Pond
- Dons Lake
- Hidden Lake
- Holding Pond
- Jackson Reservoir
- Ken's Lake
- Mud Lake
- Oowah Lake
- Pace Lake
- Rock Corral Reservoir
- Strychnine Pond
- Tenmile Wash Reservoir
- Tie Pond
- Twin Pond
- Valley City Reservoir
- Warner Lake
- Weaver Reservoir
- Yellow Cat Reservoir

== Demographics ==
Historical population
Census	Pop.	Note	%±
1890	541		—
1900	1,149		112.4%
1910	1,595		38.8%
1920	1,808		13.4%
1930	1,813		0.3%
1940	2,070		14.2%
1950	1,903		−8.1%
1960	6,345		233.4%
1970	6,688		5.4%
1980	8,241		23.2%
1990	6,620		−19.7%
2000	8,485		28.2%
2010	9,225		8.7%
2020	9,669		4.8%
2025 (est.)	9,790	▲	1.3%
US Decennial Census; 1790–1960 1900–1990; 1990–2000 2010 2020

=== Racial and ethnic composition ===
Grand County, Utah – Racial and ethnic composition Note: the US Census treats Hispanic/Latino as an ethnic category. This table excludes Latinos from the racial categories and assigns them to a separate category. Hispanics/Latinos may be of any race.
Race / Ethnicity (NH = Non-Hispanic)	Pop 1980	Pop 1990	Pop 2000	Pop 2010	Pop 2020	% 1980	% 1990	% 2000	% 2010	% 2020
White alone (NH)	7,673	6,108	7,568	7,759	7,481	93.11%	92.27%	89.19%	84.11%	77.37%
Black or African American alone (NH)	2	6	18	27	65	0.02%	0.09%	0.21%	0.29%	0.67%
Native American or Alaska Native alone (NH)	164	192	311	351	330	1.99%	2.90%	3.67%	3.80%	3.41%
Asian alone (NH)	37	22	17	77	80	0.45%	0.33%	0.20%	0.83%	0.83%
Native Hawaiian or Pacific Islander alone (NH)	x	x	2	3	11	x	x	0.02%	0.03%	0.11%
Other race alone (NH)	12	1	8	8	62	0.15%	0.02%	0.09%	0.09%	0.64%
Mixed race or Multiracial (NH)	x	x	90	119	414	x	x	1.06%	1.29%	4.28%
Hispanic or Latino (any race)	353	291	471	881	1,226	4.28%	4.40%	5.55%	9.55%	12.68%
Total	8,241	6,620	8,485	9,225	9,669	100.00%	100.00%	100.00%	100.00%	100.00%

=== 2020 census ===
According to the 2020 United States census and 2020 American Community Survey, there were 9,669 people in Grand County with a population density of 2.6 people per square mile (1.0/km^{2}). Among non-Hispanic or Latino people, the racial makeup was 7,481 (77.4%) White, 65 (0.7%) African American, 330 (3.4%) Native American, 80 (0.8%) Asian, 11 (0.1%) Pacific Islander, 62 (0.6%) from other races, and 414 (4.3%) from two or more races. 1,226 (12.7%) people were Hispanic or Latino.

There were 4,810 (49.75%) males and 4,859 (50.25%) females, and the population distribution by age was 2,047 (21.2%) under the age of 18, 5,823 (60.2%) from 18 to 64, and 1,799 (18.6%) who were at least 65 years old. The median age was 40.5 years.

There were 4,006 households in Grand County with an average size of 2.41 of which 2,416 (60.3%) were families and 1,590 (39.7%) were non-families. Among all families, 1,676 (41.8%) were married couples, 260 (6.5%) were male householders with no spouse, and 480 (12.0%) were female householders with no spouse. Among all non-families, 1,206 (30.1%) were a single person living alone and 384 (9.6%) were two or more people living together. 1,123 (28.0%) of all households had children under the age of 18. 2,632 (65.7%) of households were owner-occupied while 1,374 (34.3%) were renter-occupied.

The median income for a Grand County household was $56,639 and the median family income was $68,216, with a per-capita income of $30,948. The median income for males that were full-time employees was $47,736 and for females $36,180. 14.0% of the population and 11.5% of families were below the poverty line.

In terms of education attainment, out of the 7,137 people in Grand County 25 years or older, 442 (6.2%) had not completed high school, 1,931 (27.1%) had a high school diploma or equivalency, 2,576 (36.1%) had some college or associate degree, 1,233 (17.3%) had a bachelor's degree, and 955 (13.4%) had a graduate or professional degree.

=== Religion ===
Grand County has the lowest percentage of members of the Church of Jesus Christ of Latter-day Saints (LDS Church) among all Utah counties. About 26% of Grand County residents identify as Latter-day Saints, significantly lower than the 62% of Utah as a whole.

== Politics and government ==
Historically, following the period of William Jennings Bryan and Woodrow Wilson, Grand County has generally voted Republican. Between 1920 and 1988 (inclusive), it voted Democratic only four times: thrice for Franklin Roosevelt, and once for Lyndon Johnson. However, it has become a swing county in recent years, voting Democratic four times in the last nine presidential elections (for Bill Clinton in 1992, Barack Obama in 2008, Joe Biden in 2020, and Kamala Harris in 2024). The highest vote share any Republican has received in the county in the last nine elections was 51.1% (by George W. Bush in 2004); Joe Biden's 53.9% was the highest vote share for any nominee of either party since 1988, as well as the highest for a Democrat in the county since 1936. In 2024, Kamala Harris became the first Democratic presidential nominee to win Grand County despite losing the presidential election since 1900.

Grand County is one of only thirteen counties to have voted for Obama in 2008, Romney in 2012, Trump in 2016, and Biden in 2020. (Note: The other twelve are Butte County, California; Teton County, Idaho; Kent County, Maryland; Kendall County, Illinois; McLean County, Illinois; Tippecanoe County, Indiana; Kent County, Michigan; Leelanau County, Michigan; Carroll County, New Hampshire; Rockingham County, New Hampshire; Marion County, Oregon; and Albany County, Wyoming.)

State elected offices
Position	District	Name	Affiliation	First elected
Senate	27	David Hinkins	Republican	2008
House of Representatives	69	Christine Watkins	Republican	2016
House of Representatives	70	Carl Albrecht	Republican	2016
Board of Education	14	Mark Huntsman	Nonpartisan	2014

United States presidential election results for Grand County, Utah
Year	Republican		Democratic		Third party(ies)	
Year	No.	%	No.	%	No.	%
1896	28	9.59%	264	90.41%	0	0.00%
1900	178	46.11%	204	52.85%	4	1.04%
1904	262	57.21%	165	36.03%	31	6.77%
1908	232	48.74%	215	45.17%	29	6.09%
1912	191	33.75%	212	37.46%	163	28.80%
1916	213	39.52%	306	56.77%	20	3.71%
1920	306	51.17%	278	46.49%	14	2.34%
1924	278	47.93%	243	41.90%	59	10.17%
1928	347	52.58%	310	46.97%	3	0.45%
1932	278	34.53%	506	62.86%	21	2.61%
1936	272	33.62%	521	64.40%	16	1.98%
1940	432	49.04%	446	50.62%	3	0.34%
1944	428	52.64%	380	46.74%	5	0.62%
1948	418	50.54%	400	48.37%	9	1.09%
1952	675	72.27%	259	27.73%	0	0.00%
1956	1,044	76.09%	328	23.91%	0	0.00%
1960	1,130	58.40%	805	41.60%	0	0.00%
1964	1,130	49.67%	1,145	50.33%	0	0.00%
1968	1,435	60.88%	707	30.00%	215	9.12%
1972	1,837	72.15%	560	22.00%	149	5.85%
1976	1,781	62.38%	931	32.61%	143	5.01%
1980	2,362	70.42%	703	20.96%	289	8.62%
1984	2,463	73.15%	876	26.02%	28	0.83%
1988	1,895	58.34%	1,287	39.62%	66	2.03%
1992	1,100	32.91%	1,160	34.71%	1,082	32.38%
1996	1,384	42.57%	1,199	36.88%	668	20.55%
2000	1,822	50.42%	1,158	32.04%	634	17.54%
2004	2,130	51.14%	1,858	44.61%	177	4.25%
2008	1,871	45.65%	2,067	50.43%	161	3.93%
2012	1,996	50.53%	1,727	43.72%	227	5.75%
2016	1,975	42.93%	1,960	42.60%	666	14.48%
2020	2,248	43.36%	2,806	54.12%	131	2.53%
2024	2,327	43.91%	2,828	53.36%	145	2.74%

Moab has a significant environmentalist population due to nearby Arches National Park and Canyonlands National Park.

=== Sagebrush Rebellion ===
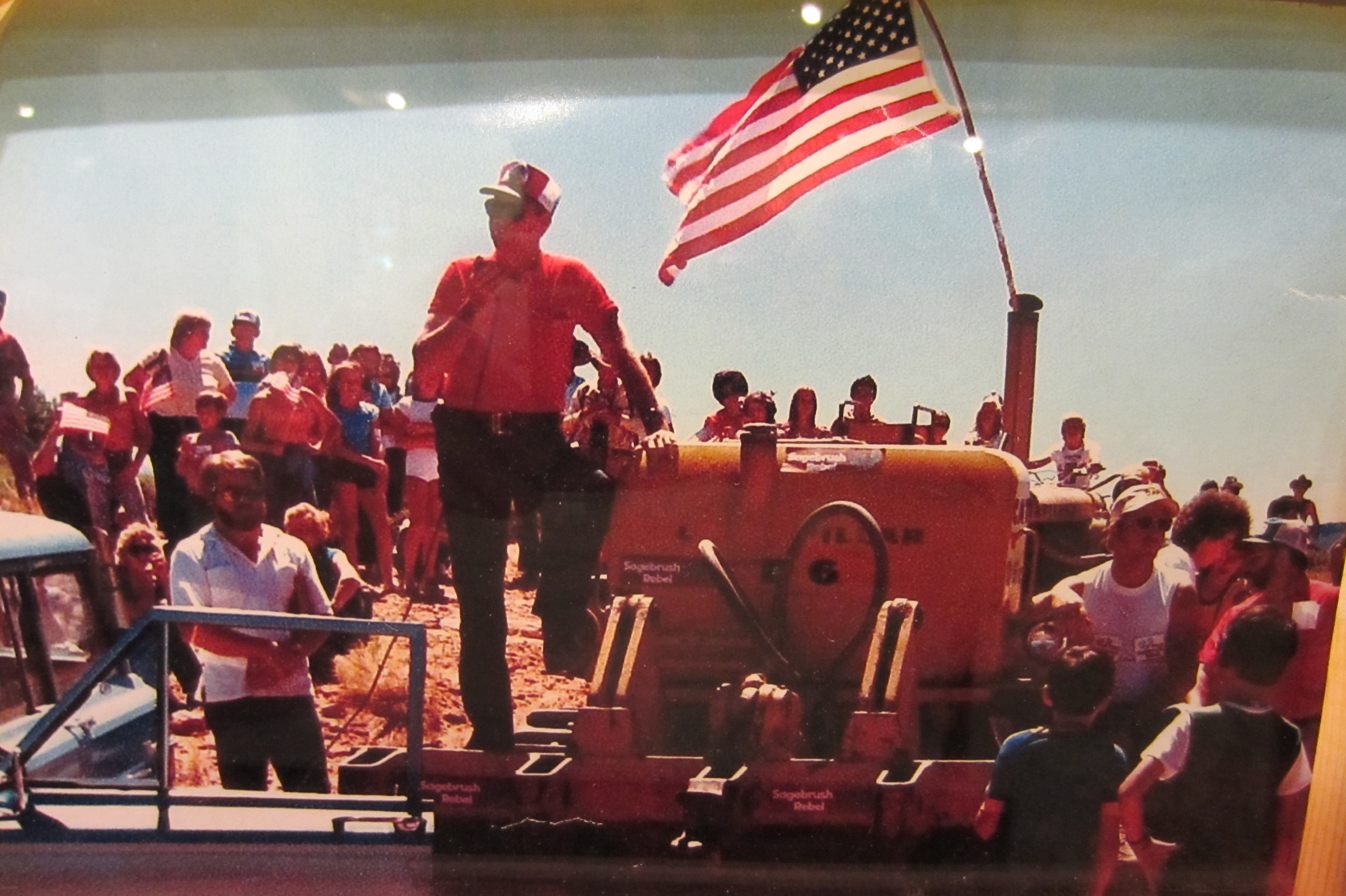
Grand County residents protest a Bureau of Land Management study area on July 4, 1980.

Grand County was an epicenter of the Sagebrush Rebellion, which took place during the late 1970s and early 1980s when residents protested what they saw as overreaching Federal control of Western US land.

An early event in the Rebellion was July 4, 1980, when 300 Grand County residents gathered behind a flag-decorated bulldozer in protest of the inclusion of Mill Creek Canyon as part of a Bureau of Land Management wilderness study area. Despite plowing nearly 200 yards up the canyon, the group did not reach the study area's boundary.

== Paleontology ==
The Denver Museum of Natural History opened a small Cedar Mountain Formation quarry that has produced diverse dinosaur fossils including theropod, sauropod and ornithopod. An adult sauropod was designated the type specimen of the genus Venenosaurus.

== Communities ==
Map of Grand County communities

=== Cities ===
- Moab (county seat)

=== Towns ===
- Castle Valley

=== Census-designated places ===
- Thompson Springs

=== Unincorporated communities ===
- Castleton
- Cisco
- Dewey
- Mesa
- Richardson
- Westwater

=== Former communities ===
- Agate
- Basin
- Cottonwood
- Elba
- Floy
- Harley Dome
- Sego
- Valley City

== See also ==
- National Register of Historic Places listings in Grand County, Utah
- Greentown Gas Condensate Field
- Moab uranium mill tailings pile
- List of counties in Utah
