= Barrier Canyon Style =

Ancient rock art found in modern-day U.S.

Barrier Canyon Style (BCS) describes a distinctive style of rock art which appears mostly in Utah, with the largest concentration of sites in and around the San Rafael Swell and Canyonlands National Park, but the full range extends into much of the state and western Colorado. The term was first applied by Polly Schaafsma (The Rock Art of Utah, 1971) to describe a handful of similar sites known at the time, including several along Barrier Creek in Horseshoe Canyon (formerly known as Barrier Canyon). Barrier Canyon Style rock art panels are mostly pictographs (painted) but there are also several petroglyphs (pecked) in the style. These panels are believed to have been created during the archaic period (probably late archaic) and are estimated (from direct and indirect carbon 14 dates) to be somewhere in the range of 1500 to 4000 years old, possibly older -- clay figurines of a similar style found in Cowboy Cave (in a tributary canyon to Horseshoe Canyon) have been dated to over 7000 years old.

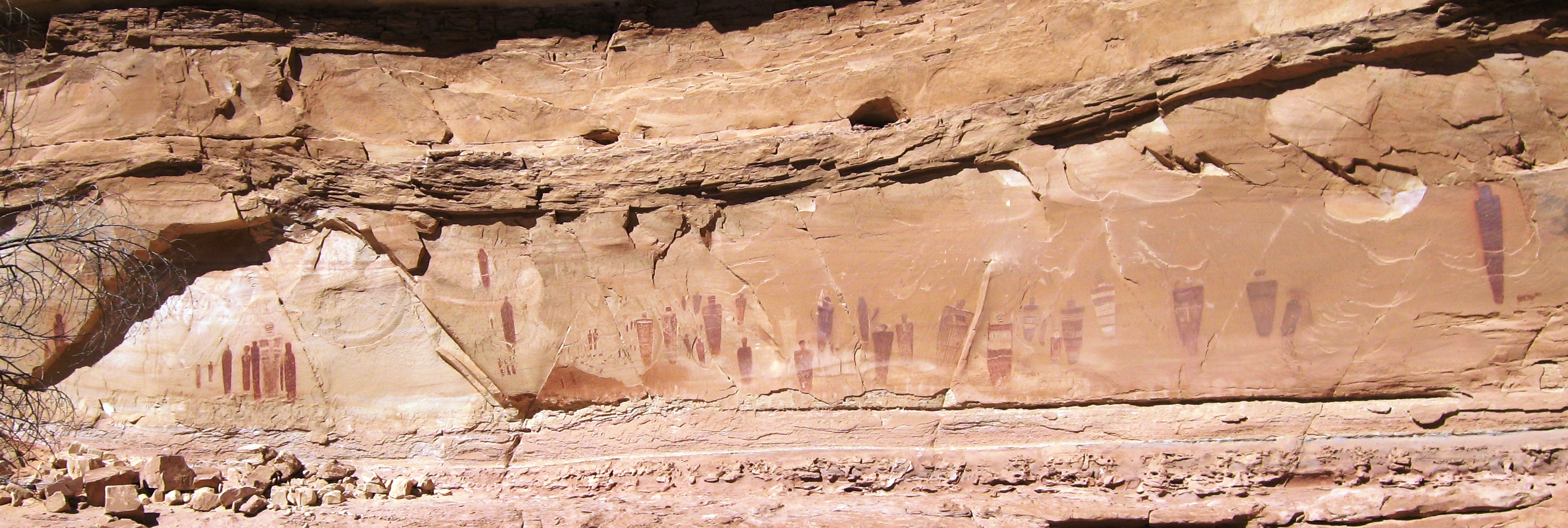
The Great Gallery, an extensive panel in the Barrier Canyon Style in Canyonlands National Park

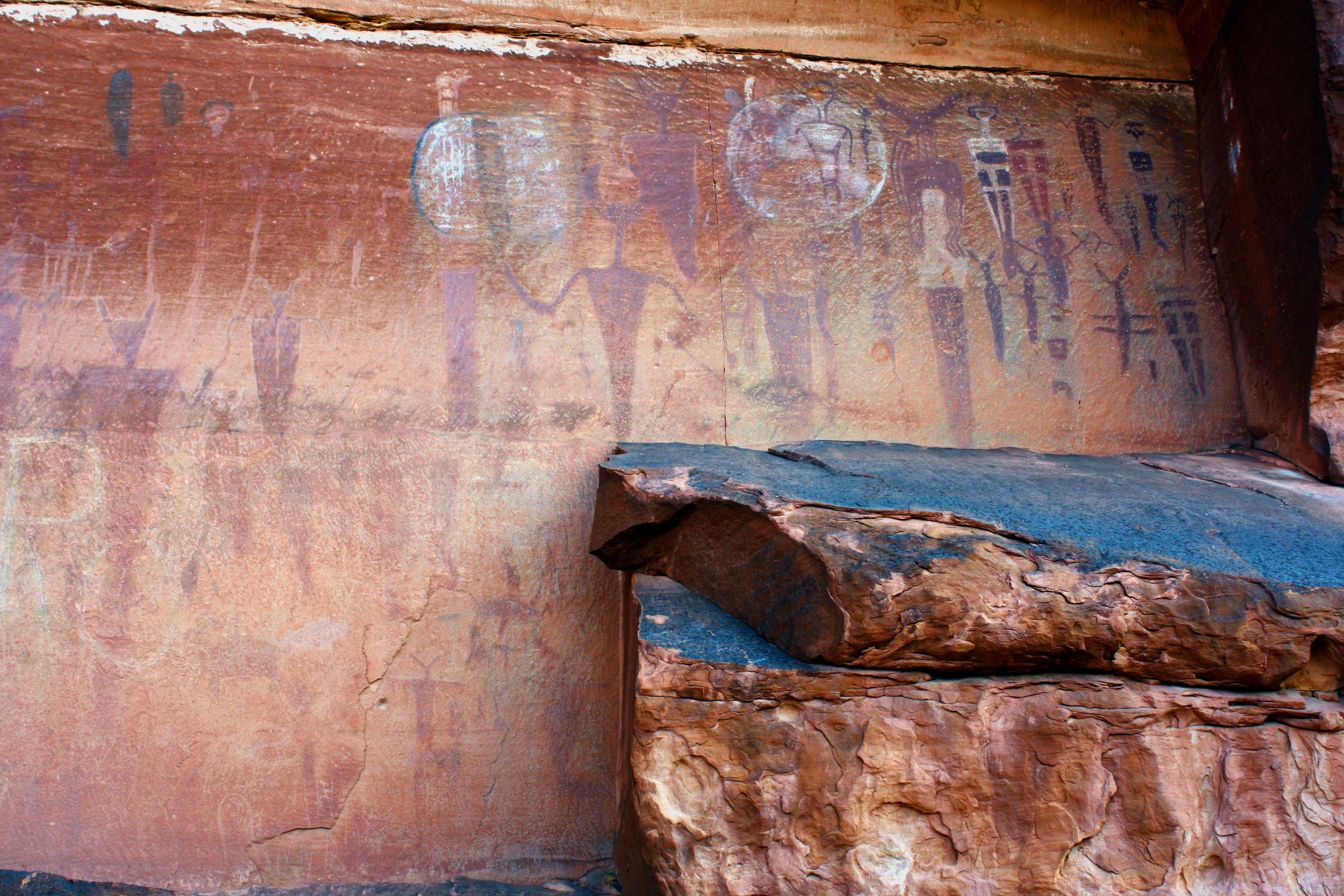
Courthouse Wash Panel, located above Moab, Utah in Arches National Park. This panel was extensively vandalized in 1980 using a steel wire brush. No one was convicted and the motive for the destruction is unknown.

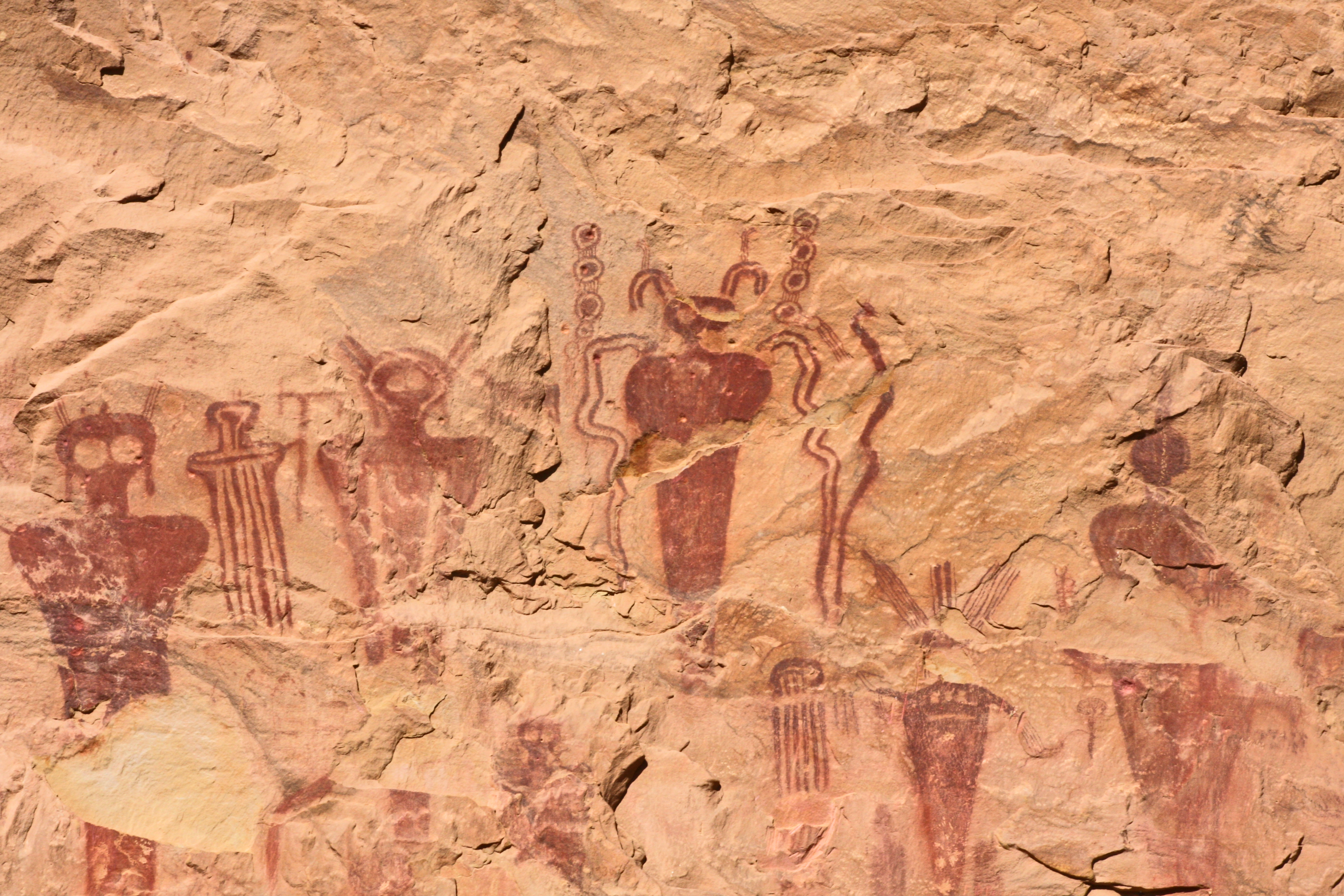
Barrier Canyon style pictographs in Sego Canyon, near Thompson Springs, Utah

== Sites ==
- Horseshoe Canyon
- Buckhorn Draw Pictograph Panel
- Courthouse Wash Pictographs in Arches National Park
- Sego Canyon
