= Thompson Springs, Utah =

Thompson Springs
- Census-designated place
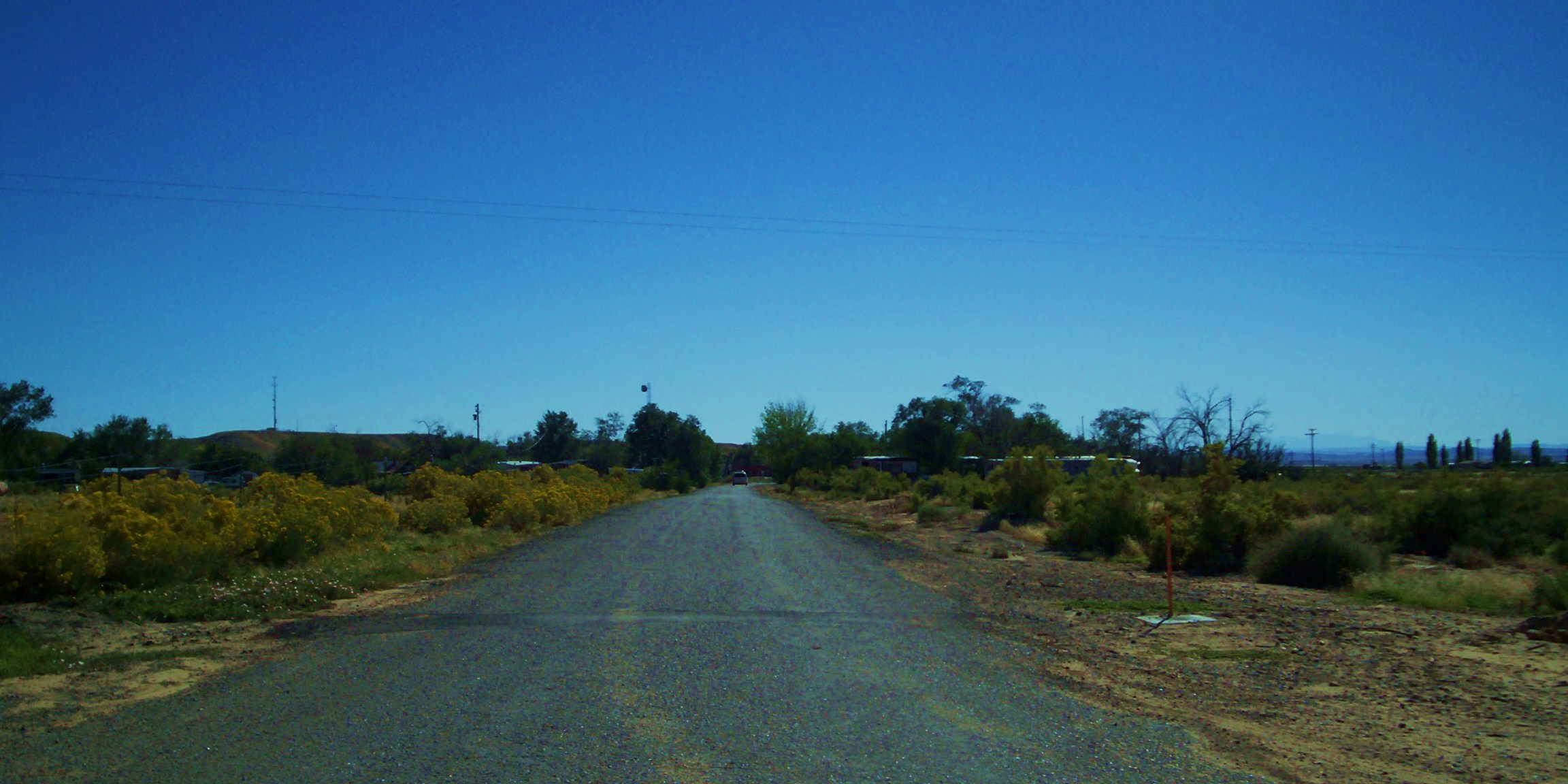
- Thompson Springs, September 2007

- Location in Grand County and the state of Utah
- Coordinates: 38°57′49″N 109°42′13″W
- Country: United States
- State: Utah
- County: Grand
- Founded: 1880s
- Named for: E.W. Thompson

Area
  - Total: 3.19 sq mi (8.25 km^{2})
  - Land: 3.19 sq mi (8.25 km^{2})
  - Water: 0 sq mi (0.0 km^{2})
- Elevation: 5,082 ft (1,549 m)

Population (2020)
  - Total: 34
  - Density: 11/sq mi (4.1/km^{2})
- ZIP code: 84540
- Area code: 435
- FIPS code: 49-76180
- GNIS feature ID: 2584780

Thompson Springs, also officially known for a time as just Thompson, is a small census-designated place in central Grand County, Utah, United States. As of the 2020 census, Thompson Springs had a population of 34. The town is just north of the east–west highway route shared by Interstate 70, U.S. Route 6 and U.S. Route 50, between Crescent Junction and Cisco. Moab, the county seat, is 37 miles (60 km) to the south. Thompson Springs is located in high desert country with the Book Cliffs just to the north.

== History ==
Evidence of human habitation or use of the Thompson Springs area can be dated back to the Archaic Period, when beautiful pictographs were left in Thompson Canyon. Subsequent Anasazi, Fremont, and Ute tribes have also left their mark upon the area. The site of this rock art in Thompson Canyon has been designated as the Thompson Wash Rock Art District.

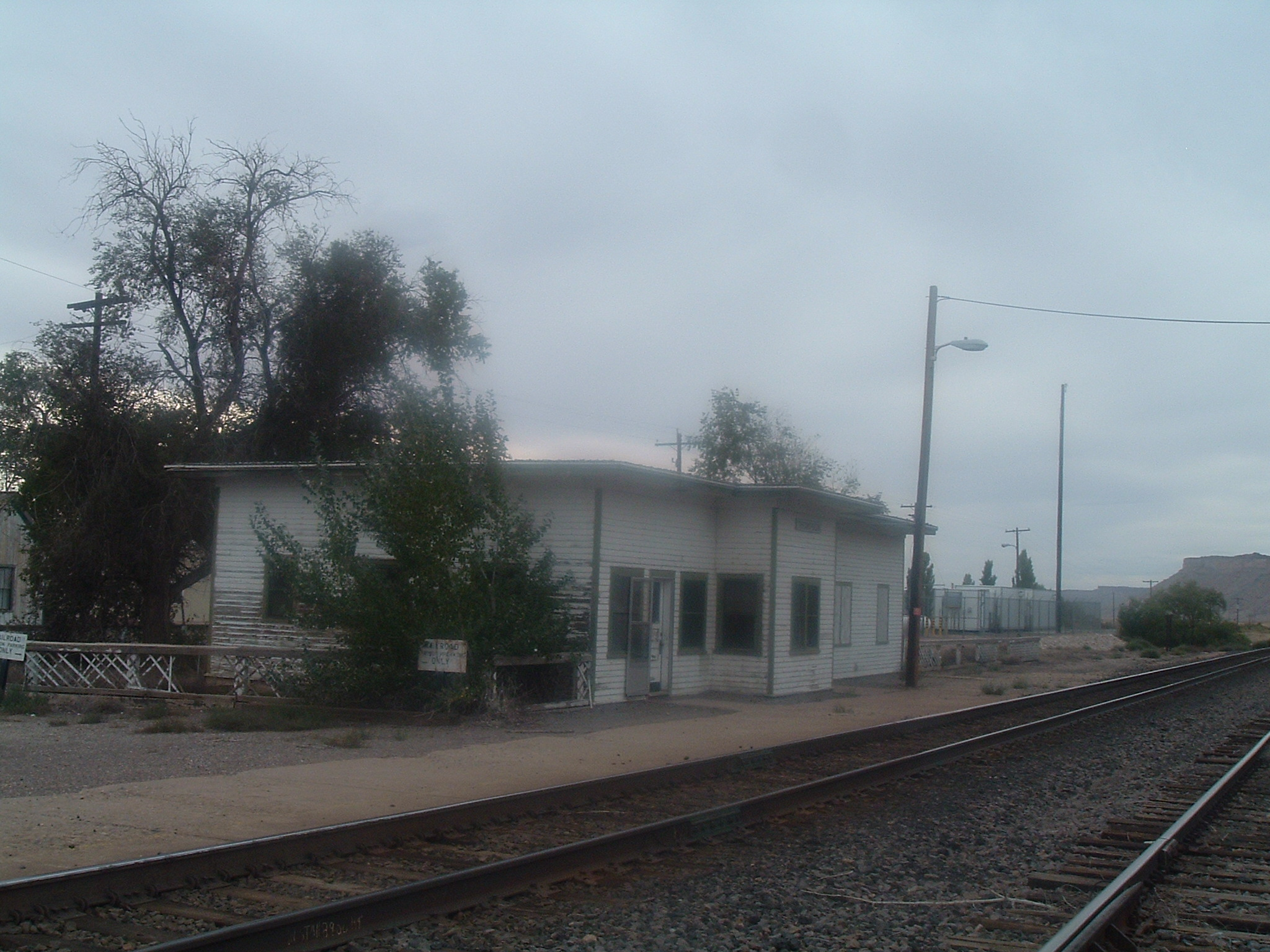
The former Thompson station was last used in 1997 and was demolished in early 2016, October 2006 photograph.

Thompson Springs was named for E.W. Thompson, who lived near the springs and operated a sawmill to the north near the Book Cliffs. The town began life in the late nineteenth century as a station stop on the Denver and Rio Grande Western Railroad (D&RGW), which had been completed through the area in 1883. A post office at the site was established in 1890, under the name "Thompson's". (The official designation by the United States Postal Service is still "Thompson".) The town was a community center for the small number of farmers and ranchers living in the inhospitable region, and it was also a prominent shipping point for cattle that were run in the Book Cliffs area. Stockmen from both San Juan and Grand counties used Thompson.

Thompson gained importance in the early twentieth century due to the development of coal mines in Sego Canyon, north of town. Commercial mining in Sego Canyon began in 1911, and that year the Ballard and Thompson Railroad was constructed to connect the mines with the railhead at Thompson. The railroad branch line and mines continued operating until about 1950.

For many years the city was served by various D&RGW passenger trains, including the Scenic Limited, the Exposition Flyer, the Prospector, the California Zephyr (where it was a flag stop, though the timetable for 1969 shows it as a regular stop), and the Rio Grande Zephyr. Although Amtrak (the National Railroad Passenger Corporation) took over nearly all passenger rail service in the United States in 1971, the D&RGW continued service through the area until 1983. Subsequently, for the next fourteen years, the city was served by various Amtrak trains, including the California Zephyr, the Desert Wind, and the Pioneer.

Construction of I-70 two miles south of Thompson Springs drew traffic away from the city as the former Old Cisco Highway (US 6 and US-50) (now named Frontage Road) was no longer used. The later movement of the passenger train stop about 25 miles (40 km) to the west in Green River (Green River station) in 1997 led to further economic hardship for Thompson Springs. (Note: Although some sources claim that the former Thompson Station closed in 1994, Amtrak's timetable shows that Thompson was still a flag stop on both the California Zephyr and Desert Wind in late 1996 (but does not include the Green River station). However, by 1997 (after the Desert Wind was discontinued) the timetable shows the California Zephyr stopping at Green River (and no longer shows a stop at Thompson).)

The original name for this settlement was "Thompson Springs", a name that was reinstated in 1985. Much of the town is uninhabited today, although there are still some operating businesses in the immediate vicinity of I-70.

The Moab Uranium Mill Tailings Remedial Action (UMTRA) Project is a uranium tailings removal and relocation project that promises to bring jobs to the area as tailings from the Atlas Mineral Company's tailings ponds outside of Moab will be moved to Crescent Junction, about 6 miles (10 km) west of Thompson Springs.

== Demographics ==
As of the census of 2020, there were 34 people living in the CDP (down from 39 in 2010). There were 23 housing units. The racial makeup of the town was 85.3% White, and 5.9% from two or more races. Hispanic or Latino of any race were 0.3% of the population.

== Transportation ==
While the community is situated just north of Interstate 70/U.S. Route 6/U.S. Route 50 (I‑70/US‑6/US‑50), the community is connected to that transportation corridor by State Route 94, which runs south from the center of town to an interchange with I‑70/US‑6/US‑50. Prior to the construction of I‑70, US‑6/US‑50 ran through the center of town. The Union Pacific Railroad runs through Thompson Springs, but Amtrak service via a flag stop was discontinued in 1994.

== Thompson Wash Rock Art District ==
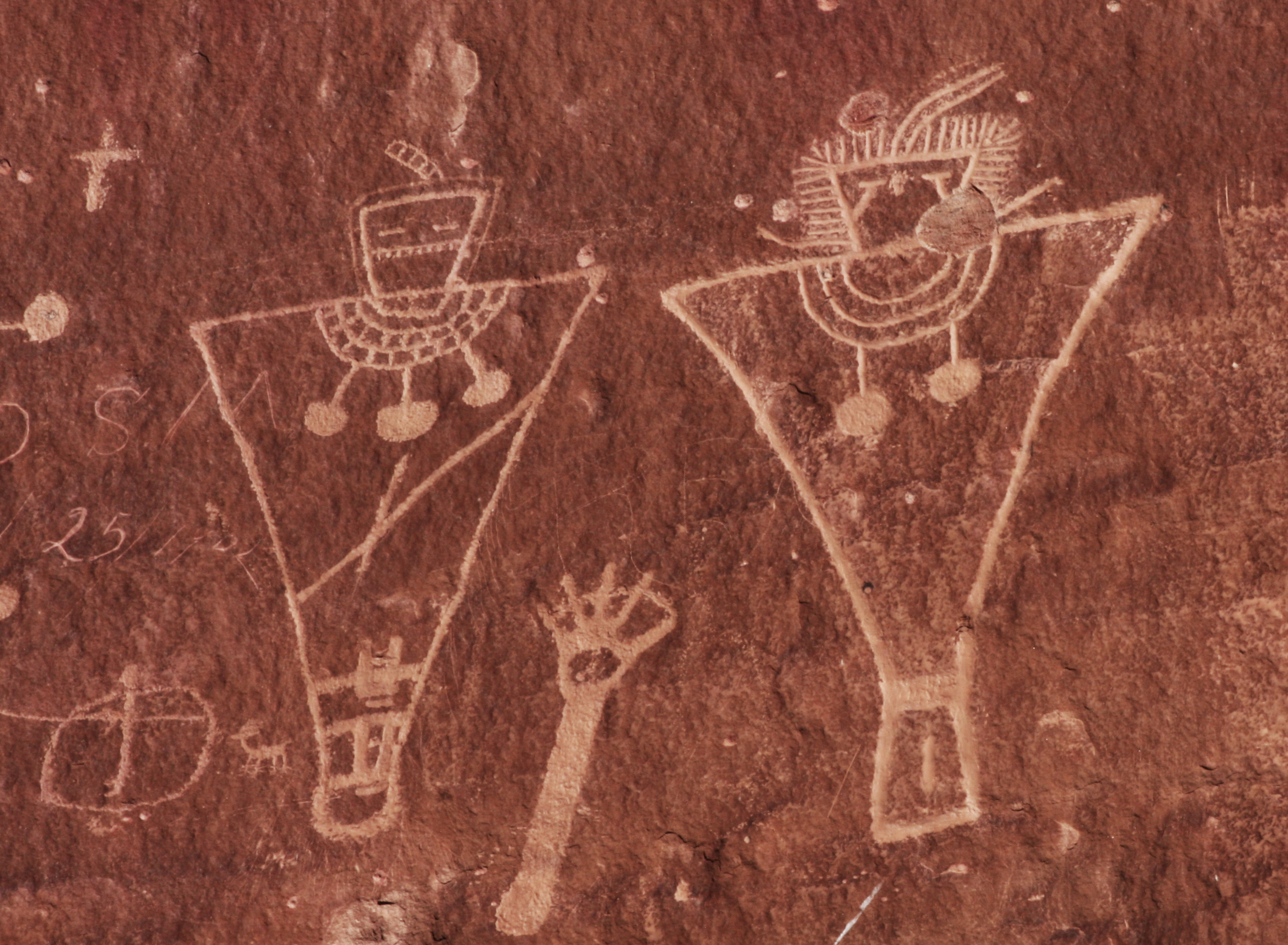
Fremont petroglyphs in Thompson Canyon, July 2010 photograph

The Thompson Wash Rock Art District (which is also referred to as the Sego Canyon Rock Art Interpretive Site by the Bureau of Land Management) is an archeological site located in Thompson Canyon (about 3.5 miles [5.6 km] north of Thompson Springs) that was named after Thompson Wash and is listed on the National Register of Historic Places. The district includes several well-preserved groups petroglyphs (images etched into the rock surface) and pictographs (images painted onto the rock surface) left by early Native Americans in three different styles (each with their own panel): Fremont, Ute and Barrier Canyon. As such it provides fairly rare opportunity to compare all three the styles in one location, particularly a site that is easily accessible. The Fremont culture thrived from A.D. 600 to 1250 and was contemporary with the Anasazi culture of the Four Corners area. The Archaic period dated from 7000 B.C., while the Barrier Canyon period from around 400 A.D., and the Ute tribe dating from A.D. 1300.

== See also ==
- List of census-designated places in Utah
