= Horseshoe Canyon (Utah) =

Canyon in Emery and Wayne counties in Utah, United States

Coordinates: 38°27′15″N 110°12′32″W

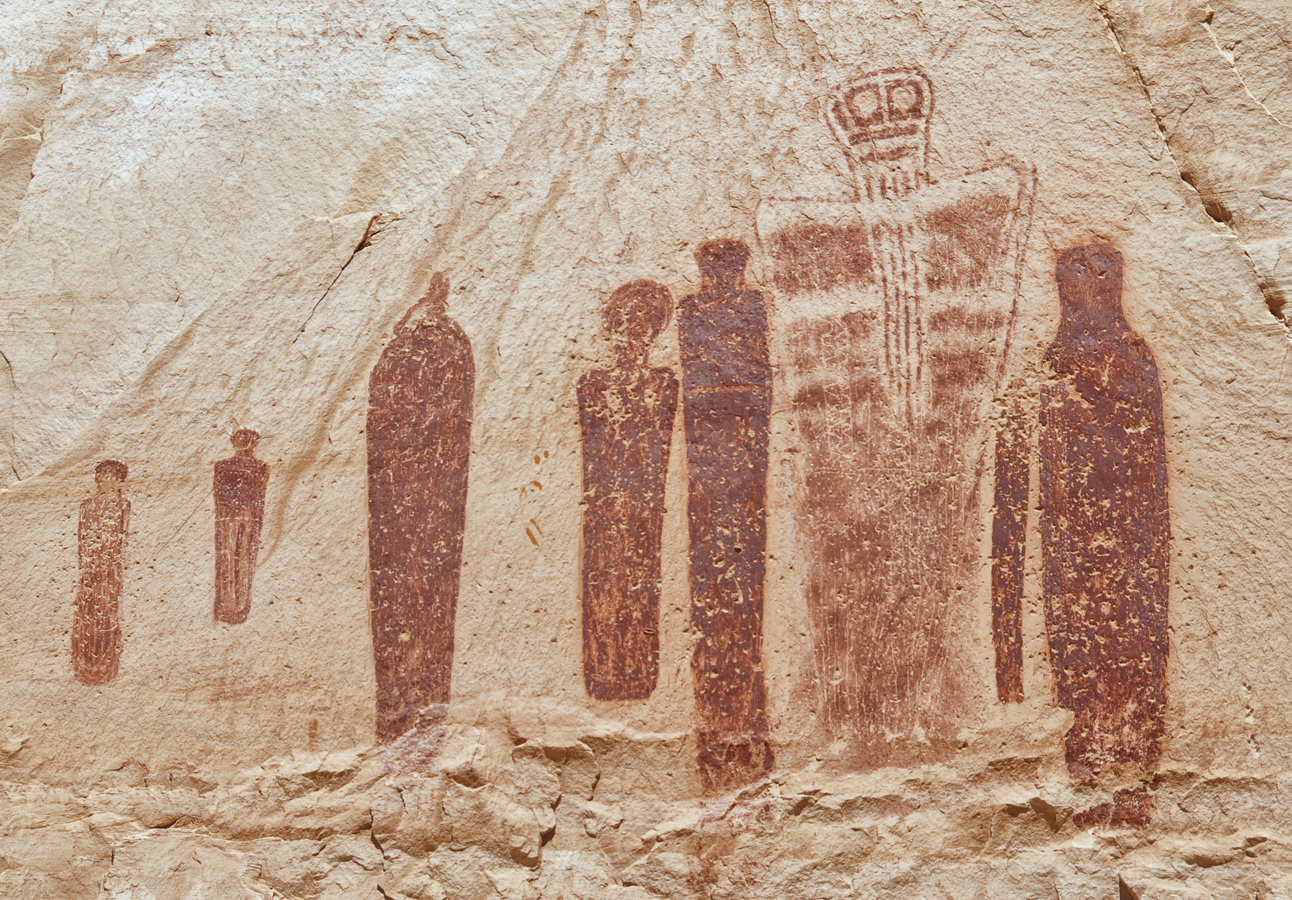
Holy Ghost panel in the Great Gallery, Horseshoe Canyon, August 2009 photograph

Horseshoe Canyon, formerly known as Barrier Canyon, is in a remote area west of the Green River and north of the Canyonlands National Park Maze District in Utah, United States. It is known for its collection of Barrier Canyon Style (BCS) rock art, including both pictographs and petroglyphs, which was first recognized as a unique style here. A portion of Horseshoe Canyon containing The Great Gallery is part of a detached unit of Canyonlands National Park. The Horseshoe Canyon Unit was added to the park in 1971 in an attempt to preserve and protect the rock art found along much of its length.

== History ==
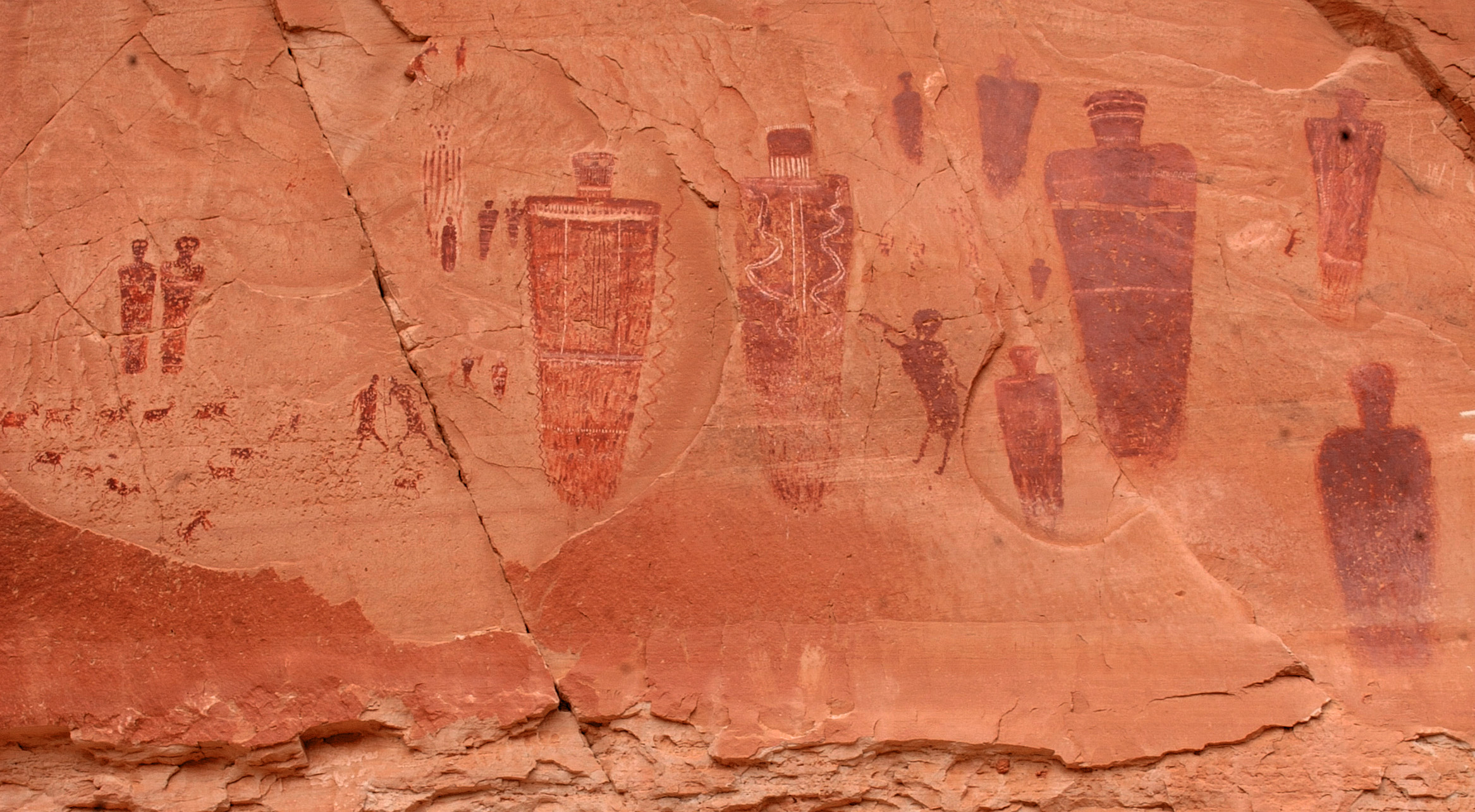
Part of the Great Gallery, February 2012 photograph

Human presence in Horseshoe Canyon has been dated as far back as 9000-7000 B.C., when Paleo-Indians hunted large mammals such as mastodons and mammoths across the southwest. Later inhabitants included the Desert Archaic culture, the Fremont culture, and Ancestral Puebloans. Occupation by the Fremont and Ancestral Puebloans was relatively brief; it is believed that the canyon was abandoned by Native American peoples by 1300 A.D.

The Great Gallery is one of the largest and best preserved collections of Barrier Canyon Style rock art. The gallery was a product of the Desert Archaic culture, a nomadic group of hunter-gatherers predating the Fremont and Ancestral Puebloans. The panel itself measures about 200 feet (61 m) long and 15 feet (4.6 m) high. The panel contains about 20 life-sized anthropomorphic images, the largest of which measures over 7 feet (2.1 m) tall. A Works Projects Administration produced reproduction of the paintings is located at the Natural History Museum of Utah. The Holy Ghost panel of the Great Gallery has been dated to between 400 A.D. and 1100 A.D. by dating two rockfall events of which one exposed the rock face the panel on which it was made and the second damaging part of the panel.

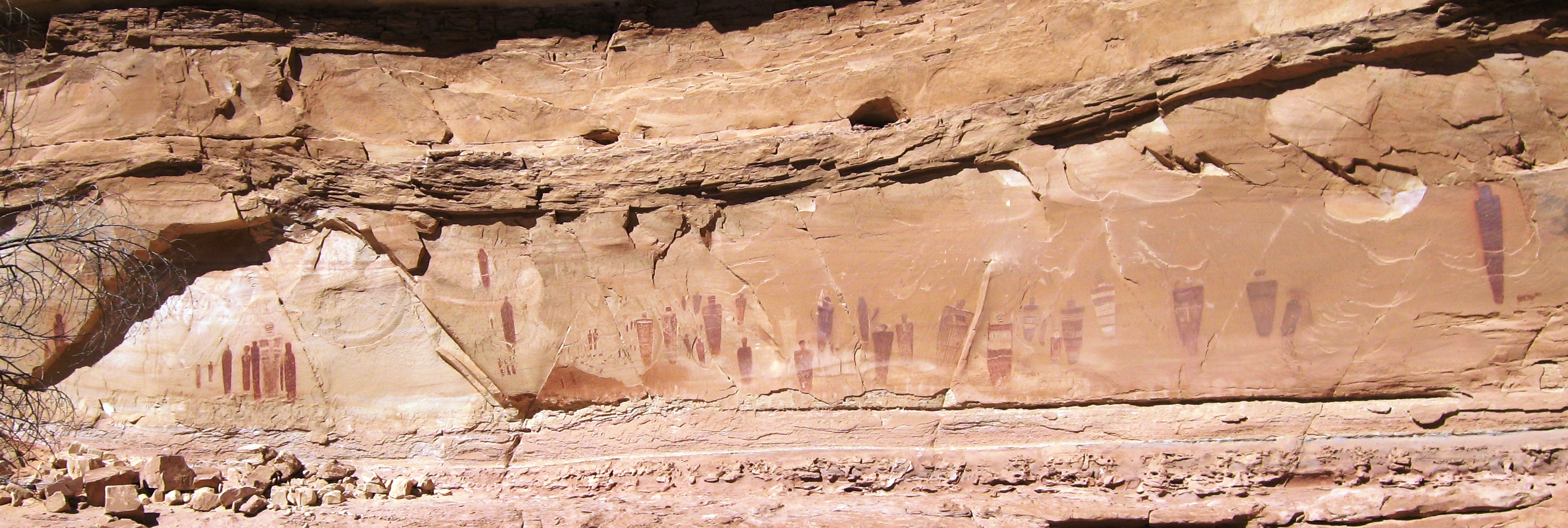
The Great Gallery, Canyonlands National Park, October 2007 photograph

== Access ==
The Horseshoe Canyon trailhead is located on the west rim of the canyon. It can be accessed from State Route 24 via 30 miles (48 km) of graded dirt road, or from Green River via 47 miles (76 km) of dirt road. Both routes include segments of road that may become impassable when wet. Visitors may camp at the west rim trailhead, on public land managed by the Bureau of Land Management, or BLM. A vault toilet is provided but there is no water available. Overnight camping is not permitted in Horseshoe Canyon inside the Park boundaries.

To see the rock art, visitors must descend 750 vertical feet (228 m) to the canyon bottom and hike approximately 3 miles (4.8 km). The hike from the West Rim trailhead to the Great Gallery is roughly 6.5 miles (10.5 km) round trip, and requires 3 to 6 hours to complete. The trail is fairly well marked, but reaching the Great Gallery requires a certain amount of stamina and endurance, particularly in the heat. Three other significant panels of rock art are passed en route to the Great Gallery.

== See also ==
- List of canyons and gorges in Utah
- Bluejohn Canyon, tributary of the Horseshoe, site of Aron Ralston's accident
- National Park Service
- Koyaanisqatsi, a film that uses images from the great gallery
