= Polly Schaafsma =

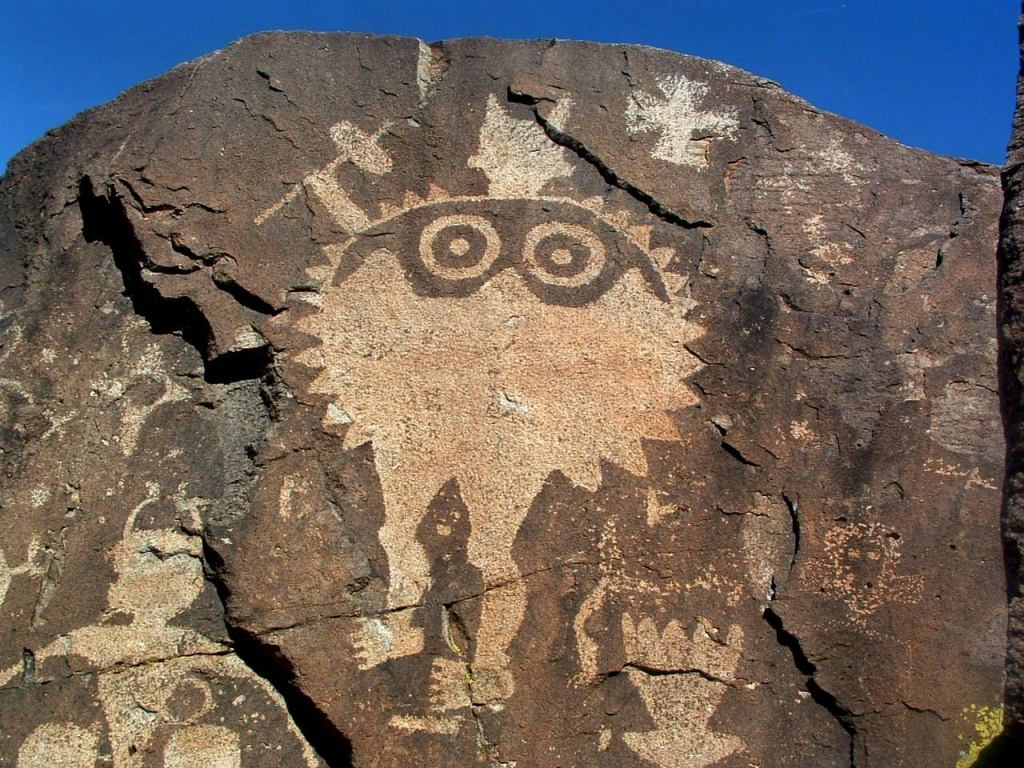
Warrior with shield, Comanche Gap near Galisteo, New Mexico. This Southern Tewa petroglyph and one of a "star person" are featured on the cover of Schaafsma's Warrior, Shield, and Star.

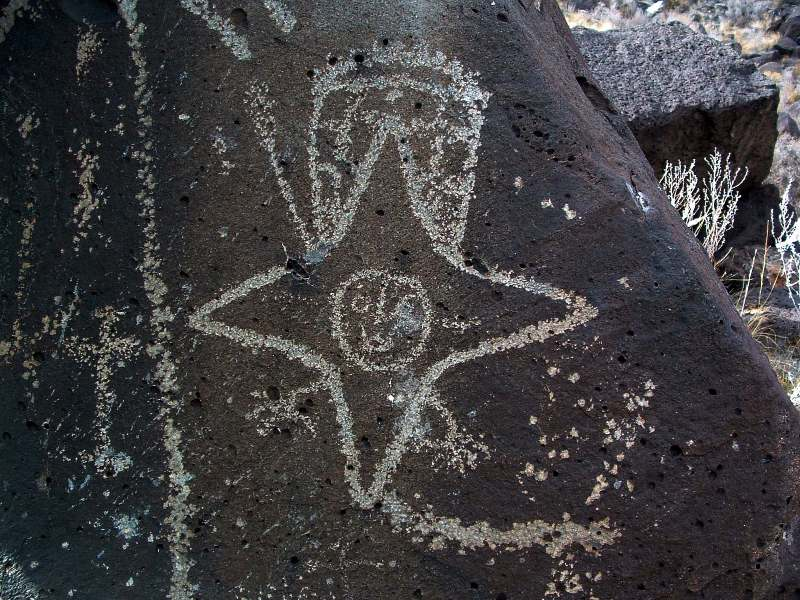
"Star person" petroglyph at Rinconada section, Petroglyph National Monument. This Southern Tiwa feathered star with talons probably represents the Morning Star.

Polly Dix Schaafsma is an American archaeologist, best known for her publications on Native American rock art. Schaafsma is a research associate in the Laboratory of Anthropology, Museum of New Mexico, Santa Fe, New Mexico. She and her husband, anthropologist Curtis F. Schaafsma, have published research on the origins of the prehistoric Katchina cult in what became the Southwest USA.

Schaafsma is a frequent lecturer and instructor at rock art field seminars for the School for Advanced Research, the Museum of New Mexico, Crow Canyon Archaeological Center, and elsewhere. In 2008, Schaafsma received the Klaus Wellmann Memorial Award from the American Rock Art Research Association.

== Selected publications ==
- Polly Schaafsma, 2000, Warrior, Shield, and Star: Imagery and Ideology of Pueblo Warfare. ISBN 978-1-889921-06-8
- David Muench and Polly Schaafsma, 1995, Images in Stone. ISBN 978-1-56313-442-5. Review at Apogee Photo Magazine
- Polly Schaafsma, 1980, Indian rock art of the Southwest. ISBN 0-8263-0524-5, ISBN 0-8263-0913-5 (1986 reprint)
- Schaafsma, Polly, and Curtis F. Schaafsma, 1974, "Evidence for the Origins of the Pueblo Katchina Cult as Suggested by Southwestern Rock Art". American Antiquity 39: 535–545.
- Polly Schaafsma, 1972, Rock art in New Mexico. ISBN 978-0-89013-232-6 (revised and expanded 1992)
- Polly Schaafsma, 1971, The Rock Art of Utah. ISBN 0-87480-435-3 (revised edition, 2002)
