= 2008 Utah Democratic presidential primary =

- February 5, 2008

Candidate	Barack Obama	Hillary Clinton
Home state	Illinois	New York
Delegate count	14	9
Popular vote	75,538	51,333
Percentage	56.72%	39.07%
- Primary results by county Obama: 30–40% 40–50% 50–60% 60–70% Clinton: 40–50% 50–60%

The 2008 Utah Democratic presidential primary took place on February 5, 2008, with the votes of 23 pledged delegates to the 2008 Democratic National Convention at stake. The primary was one of many held on Super Tuesday. Barack Obama won the primary.

== Results ==
Key:	Withdrew prior to contest

2008 Utah Democratic Presidential Primary
Candidate	Votes	Percentage	National delegates
Barack Obama	75,538	56.72%	14
Hillary Clinton	51,333	39.07%	9
John Edwards	3,758	2.86%	0
Bill Richardson	549	0.42%	0
Joe Biden	462	0.35%	0
Dennis Kucinich	408	0.31%	0
Mike Gravel	166	0.13%	0
Christopher Dodd	117	0.09%	0
Frank Lynch	72	0.05%	0
Totals	131,403	100.00%	23

== See also ==
- 2008 Democratic Party presidential primaries
- 2008 Utah Republican presidential primary
