= 2008 Utah Republican presidential primary =

- February 5, 2008
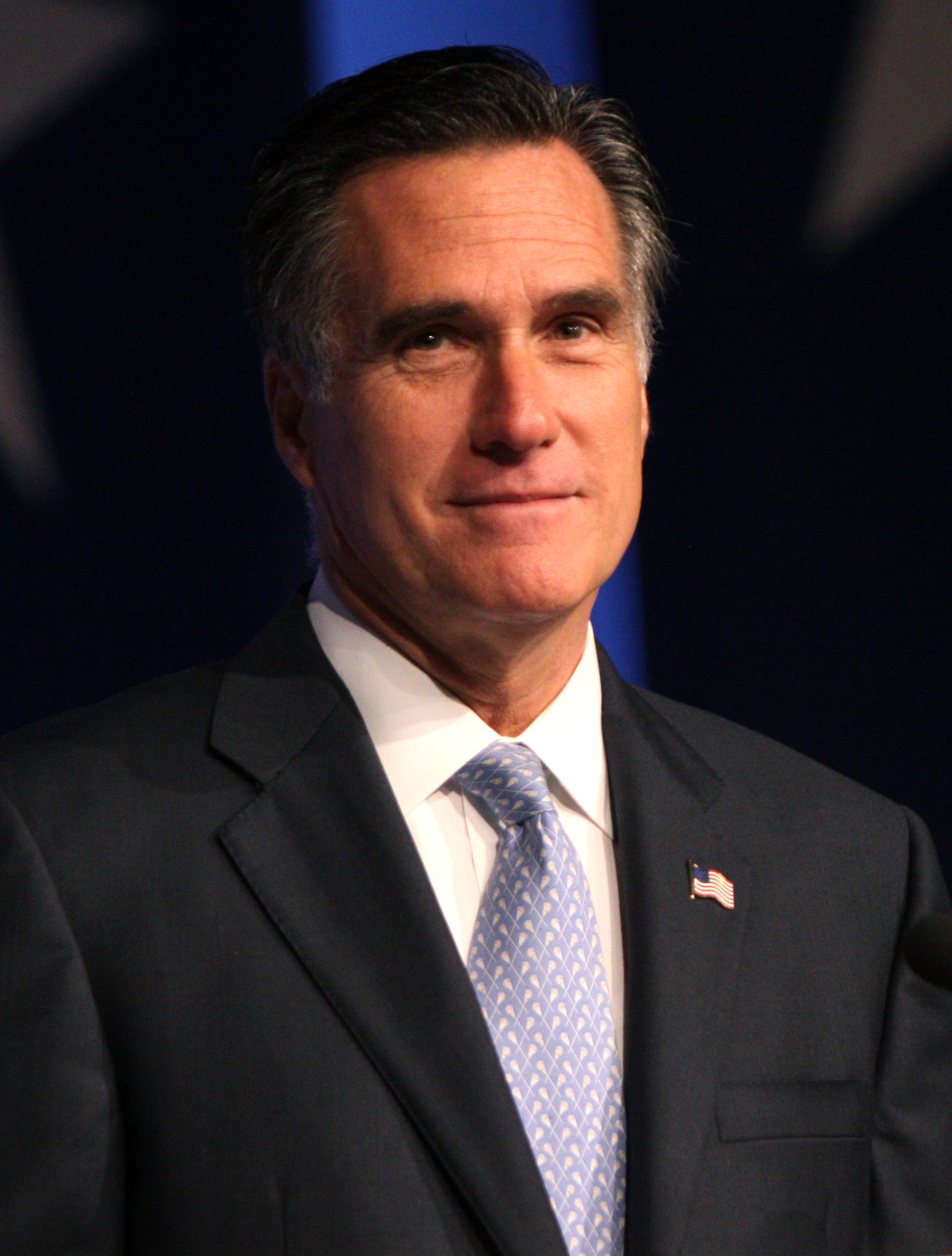

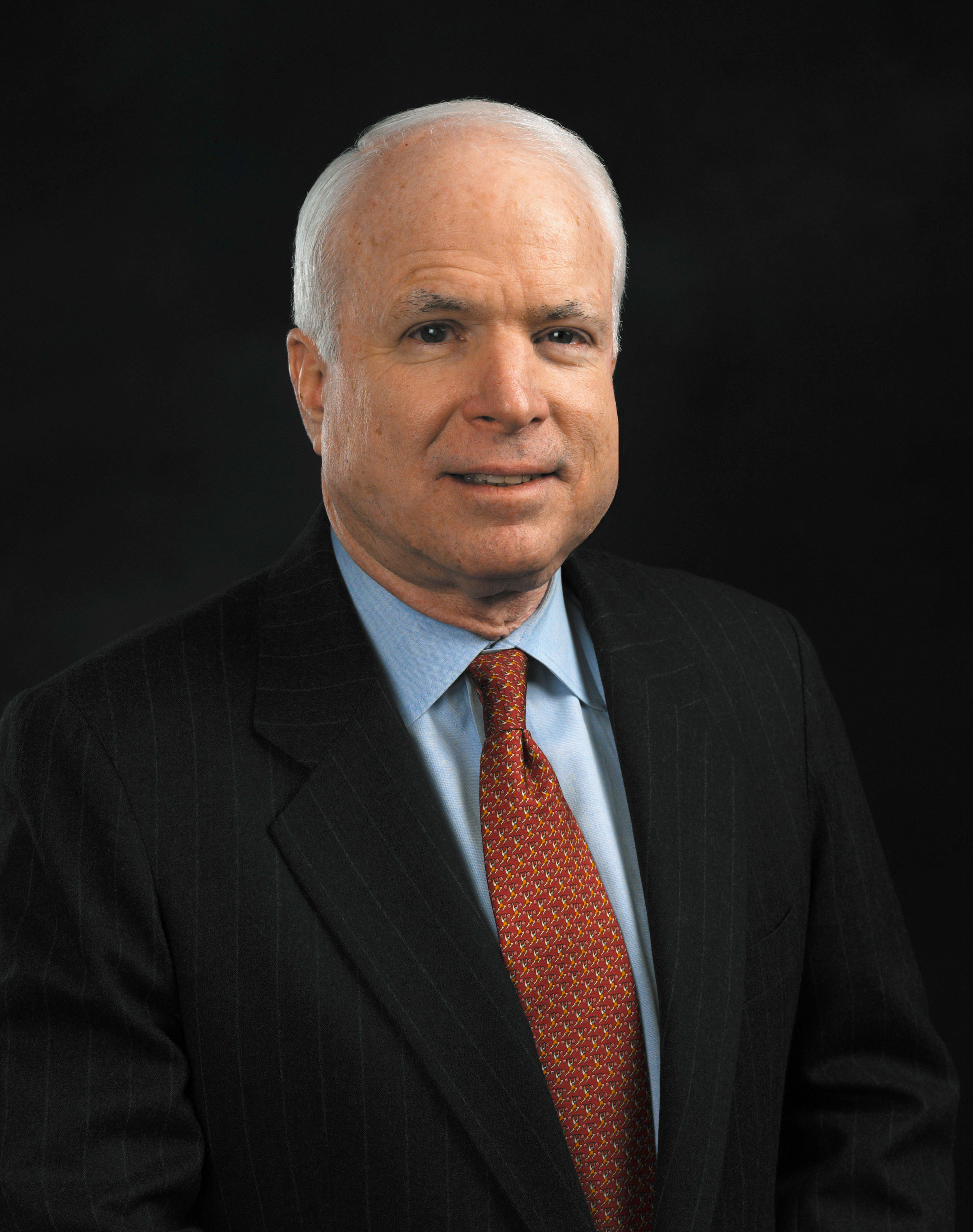
| Candidate | Mitt Romney | John McCain |
| Party | Republican | Republican |
| Home state | Massachusetts | Arizona |
| Delegate count | 36 | 0 |
| Popular vote | 264,956 | 15,931 |
| Percentage | 89.49% | 5.38% |
- Election results by county. Mitt Romney

The 2008 Utah Republican presidential primary took place on February 5, 2008, with 36 national delegates. Polls showed Mitt Romney leading at up to 85% of the vote.

On August 23, 2008, the Utah Republican Party adopted a standing rule effectively binding the delegates to John McCain for the first ballot at the National Convention (as Romney had withdrawn).

== Results ==
Official results
| Candidate | Votes | Percentage | Delegates |
|---|---|---|---|
| Mitt Romney | 264,956 | 89.49% | 36 |
| John McCain | 15,931 | 5.38% | 0 |
| Ron Paul | 8,846 | 2.99% | 0 |
| Mike Huckabee | 4,252 | 1.44% | 0 |
| Rudy Giuliani | 988 | 0.33% | 0 |
| Fred Thompson | 613 | 0.21% | 0 |
| Alan Keyes | 261 | 0.09% | 0 |
| Duncan Hunter | 211 | 0.07% | 0 |
| Tom Tancredo | 3 | 0.00% | 0 |
| Total | 296,061 | 100% | 36 |

== See also ==
- 2008 Republican Party presidential primaries
- 2008 Utah Democratic presidential primary
