= Sego, Utah =

- Ghost town
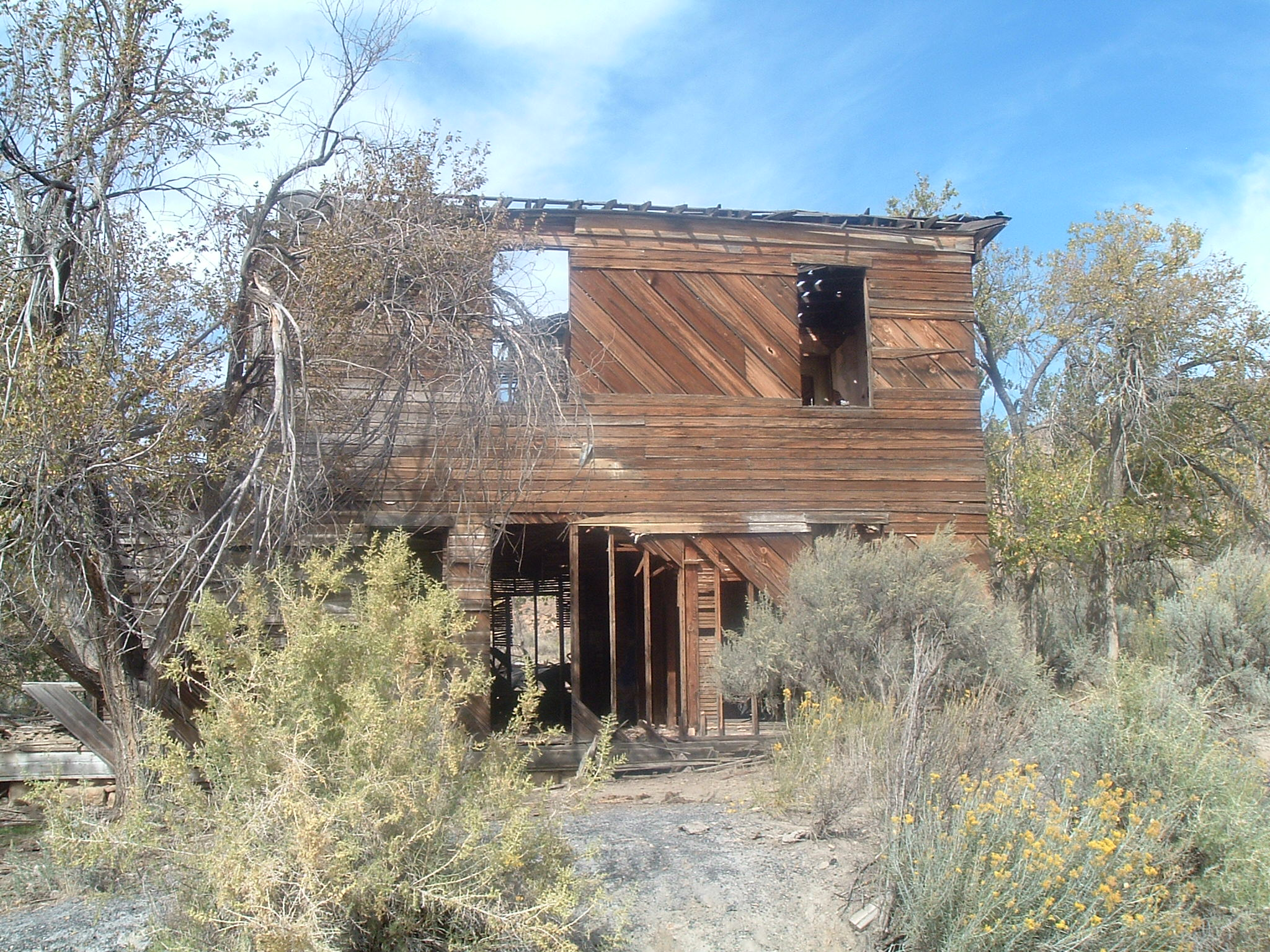
- The Sego boarding house, now collapsed

- Location within Utah Location within the United States
- Coordinates: 39°01′59″N 109°42′11″W
- Country: United States
- State: Utah
- County: Grand
- Established: 1910
- Abandoned: 1955
- Named for: Sego lily
- Elevation: 5,712 ft (1,741 m)
- GNIS feature ID: 1437678
- Ballard-Sego Coal Mine Historic District
- U.S. National Register of Historic Places
- U.S. Historic district
- Area: Approximately 5,280 acres (2,140 ha)
- NRHP reference No.: 100001335
- Added to NRHP: October 13, 2017

Sego /ˈseɪɡoʊ/ is a ghost town in Grand County, Utah, United States. It lies in the narrow, winding Sego Canyon, in the Book Cliffs some 5 miles (8.0 km) north of Thompson Springs. Formerly an important eastern Utah coal mining town, Sego was inhabited about 1910–1955. The town is accessed via the grade of the Ballard & Thompson Railroad, a spur from the Denver and Rio Grande Western built by the founders of the town to transport the coal.

On October 13, 2017, much of the historic area of Sego was listed on the National Register of Historic Places as the Ballard-Sego Coal Mine Historic District.

== History ==
Henry Ballard, one of the founders of Thompson Springs, discovered an exposed vein of anthracite coal here in 1908 while exploring the many canyons of the Book Cliffs. He quietly bought the land and began to hire local laborers to mine the coal. The coal camp was naturally called Ballard.

By 1911 Ballard had sold out to a Salt Lake City businessman named B.F. Bauer, who formed a corporation called American Fuel Company. The company began to expand mining operations far beyond Ballard's unambitious scale, installing a modern coal tipple and the first coal washer west of the Mississippi River. The Ballard & Thompson Railroad company organized in 1911, its officers including Bauer and Ballard, and started to construct a spur line from Thompson to Ballard. In its five-mile run up the winding canyon, the rail line crossed the stream thirteen times. American Fuel Company also developed the town, renamed Neslen during the railroad construction for the mine's new general manager, Richard Neslen. Soon a company store, boarding house, and other buildings went up, each with its own water system. Neslen was a fairly typical company town, but in addition to building numerous company houses, mine owners took the unusual policy of allowing miners to build their own cabins wherever they chose. Shacks and dugouts dotted the canyon. When the railroad was completed in 1912, Neslen was granted its own post office. Coal began shipping in October 1912, most of it going to the Denver and Rio Grande Western Railroad. The next year the Ballard & Thompson became a subsidiary of the D&RGW.

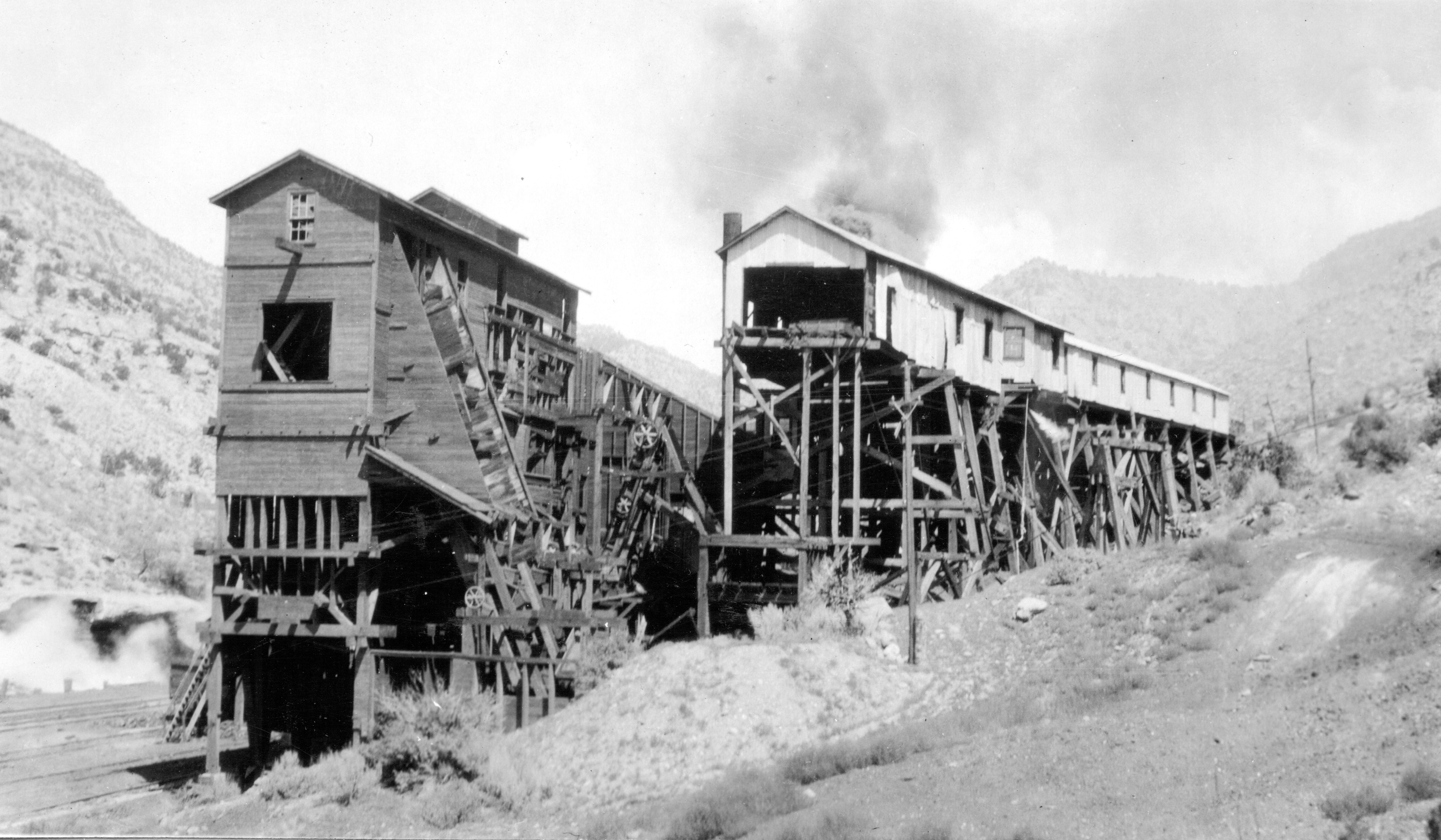
Chesterfield Coal Company in Sego, circa 1926.

The town's most serious problem, almost from the beginning, was a diminishing water supply. The water table was dropping, the creeks and springs drying up. One summer the water slowed to such a trickle that the coal washer could not even operate. Paradoxically, the railroad was plagued by excessive water, flash floods frequently damaging the bridges and trestles. The small train that served the mine was off the track as much as one fourth of the time. By 1915 profits were low to nonexistent, and paydays very irregular. Like many mines, the company tried to enforce a system where miners were paid in scrip redeemable only at the company store. Miners who dared to shop in Thompson, where prices were half those at Neslen, were threatened with the loss of their jobs. The miners went on strike in April 1915, not having been paid in five months. Many of them returned to work with the company still owing them back pay. Employment was scarce in the region, and in October 1915 wages were cut by 12–20%. Frustrated by the mine's unprofitability, Bauer forced a corporate reorganization in 1916. Richard Neslen was replaced, and the company renamed Chesterfield Coal Company. The town's name was also changed in 1918, this time to Sego for the sego lily, Utah's state flower, which grew abundantly in the canyon. The reorganization didn't solve the company's financial difficulties, however. Sego's miners were never paid regularly until they joined the United Mine Workers in 1933.

Some sources claim Sego's population grew as high as 500, but the United States Census during the town's heyday in the 1920s and 1930s doesn't bear this out. In 1920 the census count was 198, and in 1930 just over 200. Still, Sego was one of the major Grand County towns during this period.

== Railroad ==
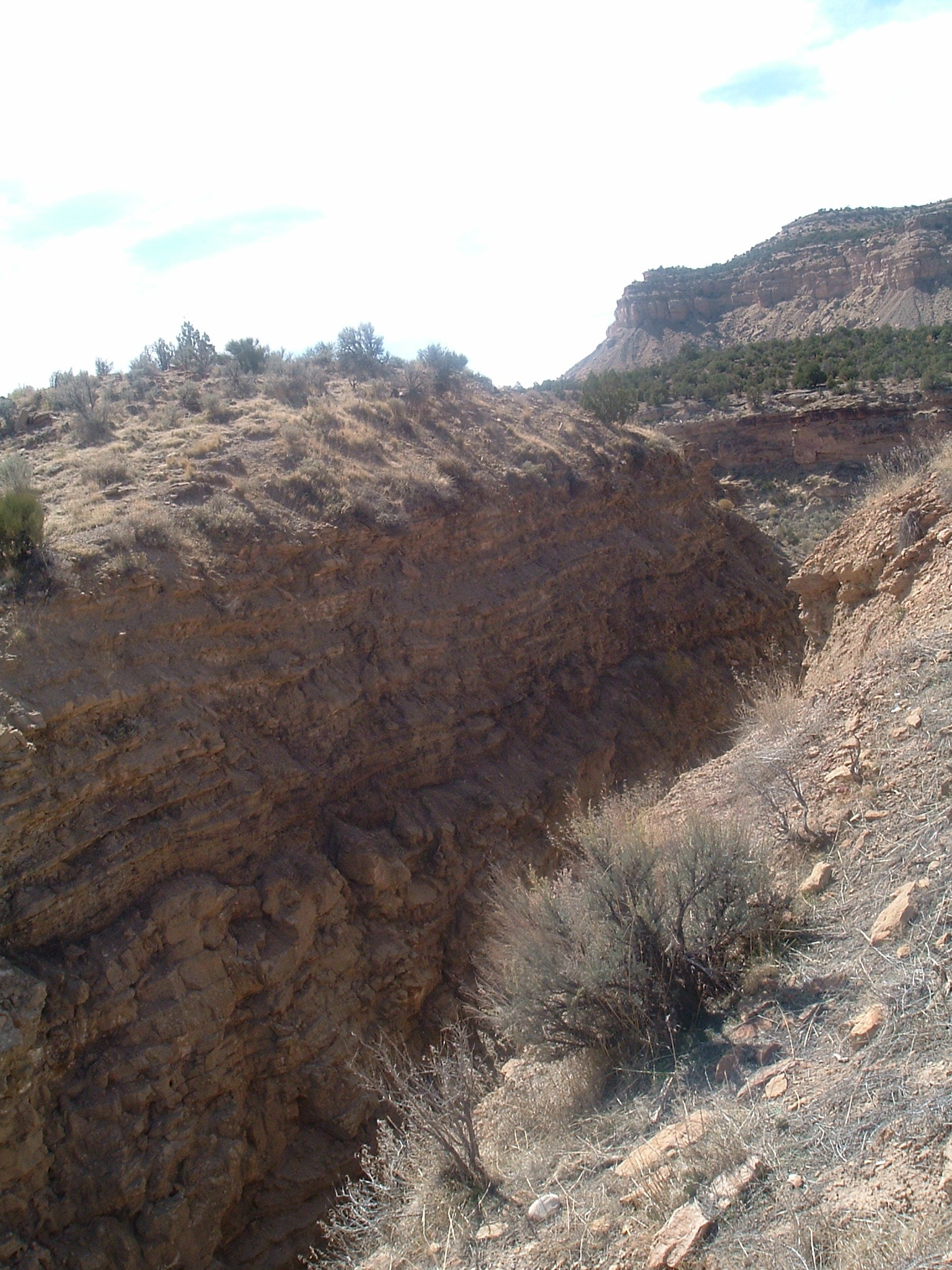
The only cut on the Ballard & Thompson grade, at the confluence of Sego and Thompson Canyons.

The closest railroad connection to Sego was the Denver & Rio Grande Western in Thompson Springs. Because of this, a new railroad was incorporated on July 15, 1911 to connect the town of Sego with the D&RGW. Called the Ballard & Thompson Railroad, the 5.25-mile (8.45 km) line never owned its own equipment, and relied on the Rio Grande for all motive power. Later on, in 1913, the railroad fell into the ownership of the D&RGW.

The branch starts at the D&RGW tracks on the northwest end of Thompson, enters Thompson Canyon, and veers through a cut along Sego Wash up Sego Canyon to the townsite. A wye was built at Thompson Springs to facilitate the turning of the steam locomotives, the grade of which is still visible.

Passenger service to Sego was almost nonexistent, although a small gas-mechanical railbus, which was owned by the coal company, was used for a short time. The train would pause in front of the Sego schoolhouse before continuing on to the mine, which considerably disrupted scholarly activities when school was in session.

At the height of coal production, from 1920 to 1947, 800 tons of coal were being mined per day, with the D&RGW making as many as nine round-trips a month to the town.

When the railroad was abandoned in 1950, the owners of the Sego mine constructed a truck ramp in Thompson to load coal directly into the railroad cars. The ramp and much of the grade, as well as three of the many single-span trestles crossing the wash, still exist, the first two miles being paved for use as an access road to Thompson's water supply. The trestles are in a dangerous condition and cannot be crossed.

== Decline ==
Historical population
Census	Pop.	Note	%±
1920	198		—
1930	223		12.6%
1940	123		−44.8%
1950	70		−43.1%
Source: U.S. Census Bureau

By 1947 production costs exceeded income, and the company decided to close down. The miners that once had numbered 125 had been reduced to just 27. These remaining miners pooled their resources, and with the backing of two banks bought out the Chesterfield Coal Company assets. Organized under the name Utah Grand Coal Company, the miners hoped to keep the mine operating. Indeed, their first year was very successful. Then fire destroyed the tipple in 1949, and another serious fire the next year burned more equipment. The final blow came when the railroad converted to diesel locomotives, virtually eliminating the demand for coal. The Utah Grand sold its holdings in 1955 to a Texas company that intended to explore for oil and natural gas. Homes were moved to Thompson, Moab, and even Fruita, Colorado, and the schoolhouse was taken to Thompson. Sego was gone. There was a flash flood in the 1950s that wiped out the rest of the miners that still worked there. Not many homes were left standing, and one was partially collapsed from a boulder falling on top of it.

The stone company store, and many foundations and dugouts still remain. The wooden boarding house collapsed sometime between October 2009 and April 2010. An underground coal seam fire has continued to burn here for decades, and smoke still rises from deserted mine shafts. Another severe flash flood in the early 1980s, known as the "Hundred Years' Flood" by locals, removed most of the remaining trestles and left the rest unsafe.

== See also ==
- List of ghost towns in Utah
