= Miners Basin, Utah =

Coordinates: 38.5423°N 109.2759°W

Miners Basin
- Ghost town
- Interactive map of Miners Basin
- Country: United States
- State: Utah
- County: Grand
- Founded: 1898
- Abandoned: 1908
- Named for: Miners Basin Mining District

Miners Basin, or simply Basin, is a ghost town in Grand County, Utah, United States. It was inhabited from 1898 to 1908.

== History ==
Miners Basin was settled among the La Sal Mountains. Copper was discovered in the area in 1888, but a mining town was not established until 1898, when the recently established Miners Basin Mining District constructed a company town for their workers. From 1896 to 1905, Miners Basin had about 75-80 residents. Businesses included two saloons, a blacksmith shop, a hotel, and a post office. Copper production did not last very long; when it stopped, most residents moved to other towns. There were only six or seven families left by 1908. Several buildings and some of the mines remain. Much of the area, nearly 700 acres (280 ha), is on private property. A hiking trail in the La Sal Mountains passes by Miners Basin.

== See also ==
- List of ghost towns in Utah
