= Westwater, Utah =

Populated place in Utah, USA

Westwater is an unincorporated community in San Juan County, Utah, United States. It occupies about 120 acres of Navajo Nation-owned land near Blanding.

Since it is not a census-designated place, the exact population is unknown. Different sources cite a population of 16 families and 29 families.
