= Long Ravine Trestle =

Railway bridges near Colfax, California

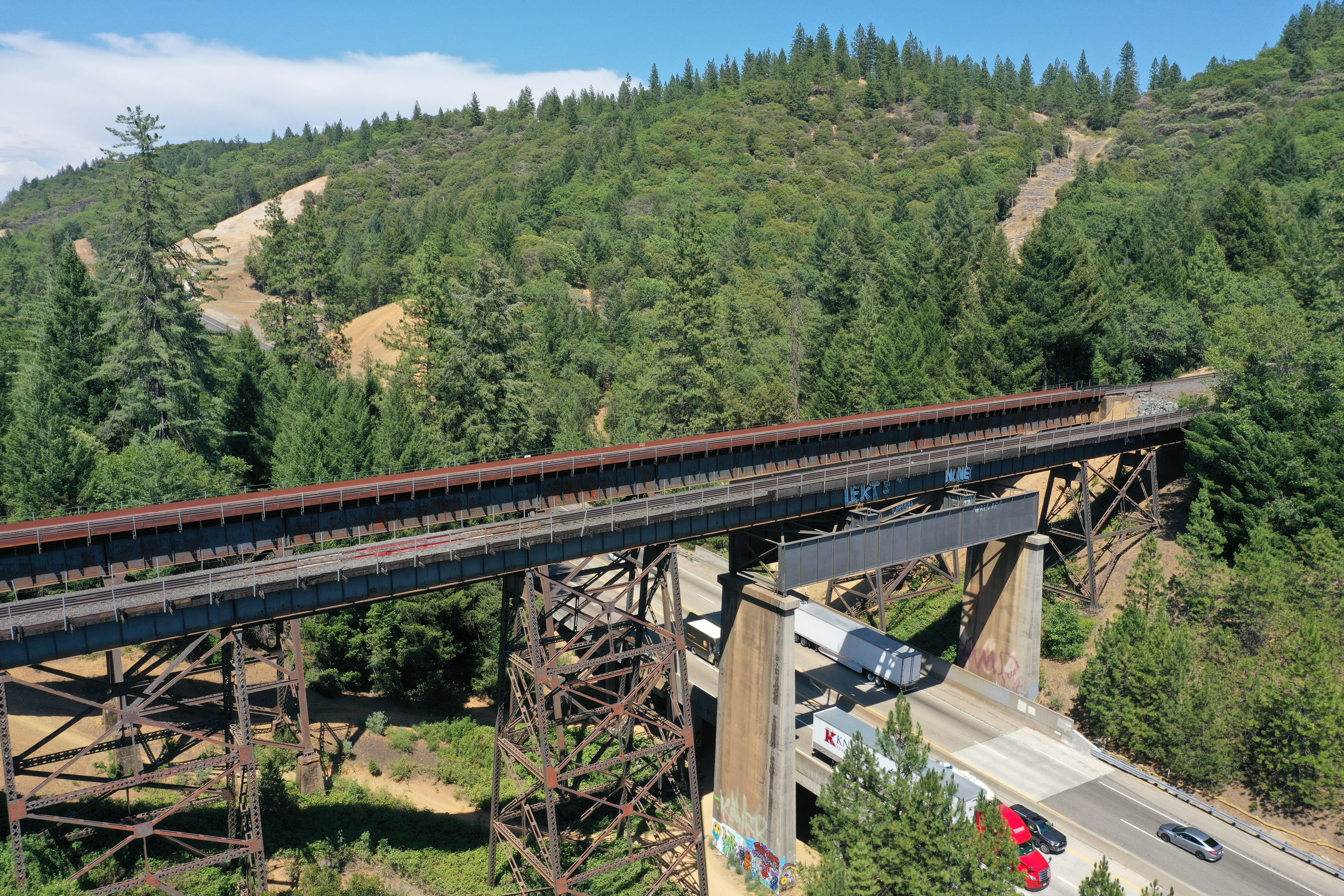
- Long Ravine Trestle spans Interstate 80 in the Sierra Nevada
- Coordinates: 39.1235°N 120.9401°W
- Carries: Roseville Subdivision
- Crosses: Long Ravine, I-80
- Locale: Colfax, California
- Owner: Union Pacific Railroad

Rail characteristics
- No. of tracks: 2
- Track gauge: 1,435 mm (4 ft 8 1/2 in) standard gauge

History
- Constructed by: Southern Pacific Railroad
- Rebuilt: 1890, 1912/1913

Location
- Interactive map of Long Ravine Trestle

Long Ravine Trestle is a pair of deck plate girder railway bridges near Colfax, California. They carry the Union Pacific Railroad Roseville Subdivision over Long Ravine and Interstate 80, traversing the Sierra Nevada. The original crossing was a three-span Howe truss bridge with wooden trestle approaches, constructed as part of the first transcontinental railroad. The Nevada County Narrow Gauge Railroad was subsequently constructed under the bridge between 1875 and 1876. The trestle portions of the bridge were replaced with embankments by this time. The original wooden trestle was replaced with an iron structure in 1890. Southern Pacific double tracked the line and constructed the two modern bridges, completed in 1912 and 1913, to carry the rails. The southern span was retrofitted in the late 1958 to allow for the new U.S. Route 40 freeway to be routed underneath. The bridge is predominantly used for freight trains, but is utilized by the daily Amtrak California Zephyr.
