= Sparks station =

Sparks, NV
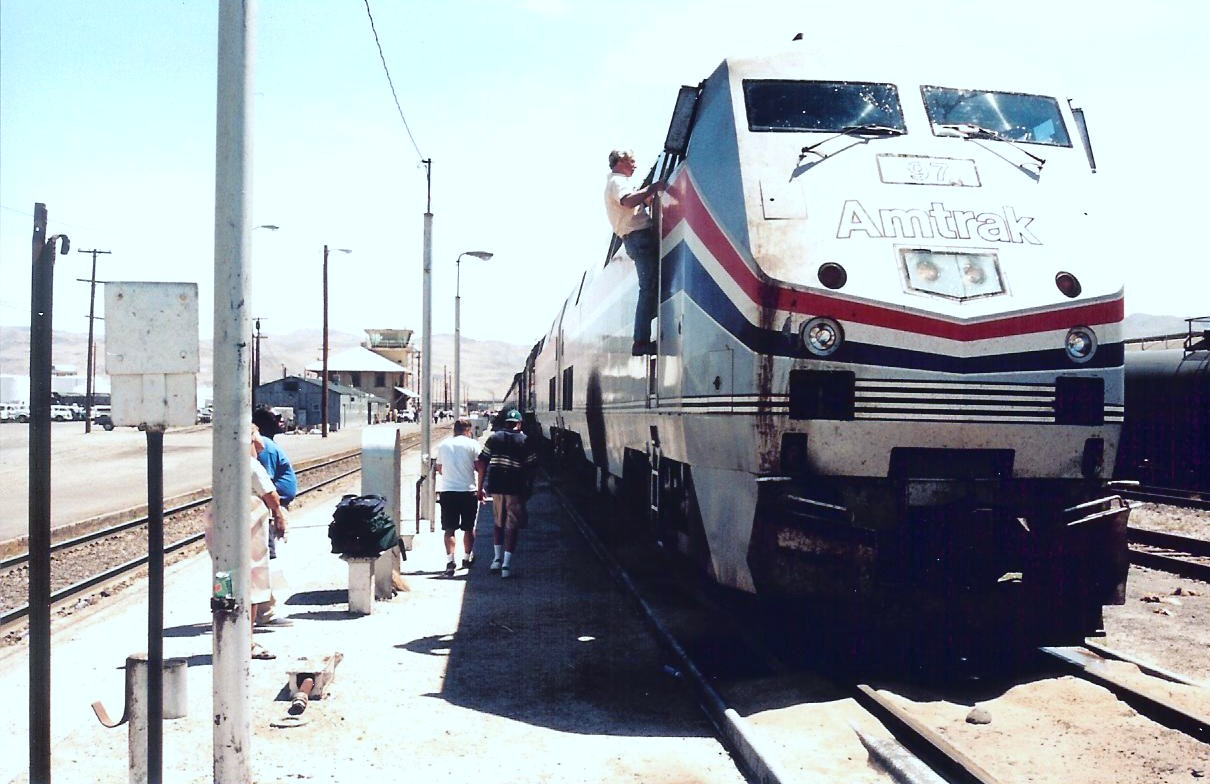
- A westbound California Zephyr at Sparks, 1998.

General information
- Location: Nugget Avenue, east of 11th Street; SP/UP Rail Yard; Sparks, Nevada 89431; United States
- Coordinates: 39.5316°N 119.7519°W
- System: Former Amtrak inter-city rail station
- Line: Union Pacific
- Platforms: 1 side platform 1 island platform
- Tracks: 2

Construction
- Parking: No
- Accessible: yes

Other information
- Station code: SPR

History
- Opened: June 19, 1904
- Closed: May 2009
- Original company: Southern Pacific

Former services
Preceding station	Amtrak	Following station
Reno toward Emeryville	California Zephyr	Lovelock toward Chicago
Preceding station	Southern Pacific Railroad	Following station
Reno toward Oakland Pier	Overland Route	Fernley toward Ogden

Nevada Historical Marker
- Official name: Southern Pacific Railroad Yards
- Reference no.: 189
Location

The Sparks station is a former passenger train station in Sparks, Nevada. The city of Sparks was established to furnish the Southern Pacific shops which were established at the site. Passenger service to the station lasted from 1904 to 2009.

== History ==
After Southern Pacific acquired formal ownership of the Overland Route, they sought to realign the line east of Reno. The original tracks of the first transcontinental railroad had been laid along what became Prater Way due to flooding along the builders' anticipated route. The new alignment would additionally bypass Wadsworth, where the railroad had sited its division terminal and shops. Thus, the company acquired a swampy tract on the line in 1902 and built up the land to construct the rail yards at what would become Sparks. The Wadsworth depot was dismantled and reassembled on the new site. On June 19, 1904, Southern Pacific formally moved their division terminal to Sparks. Many of Wadsworth's buildings were loaded on flat cars and relocated to the new site, as the company offered its employees plots of land for a nominal fee of $1.

Amtrak (the National Railroad Passenger Corporation) service commenced when the company assumed passenger operations in the United States in 1971. Sparks was served daily by the Amtrak California Zephyr, running once daily between Chicago, Illinois, and Emeryville, California (in the San Francisco Bay Area).

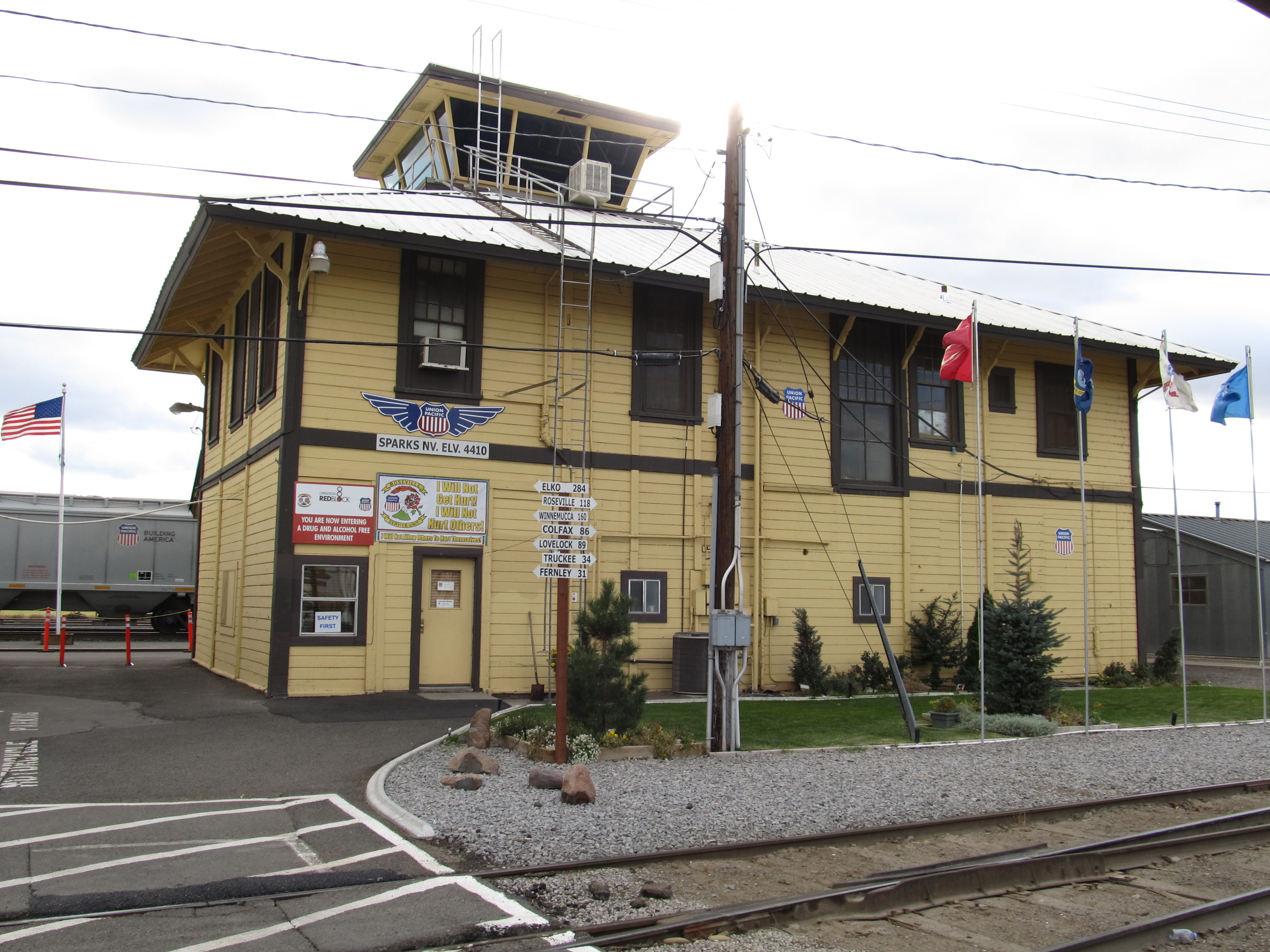
Sparks field office and tower, 2011

In May 2009, the station was closed because of its proximity to Reno (three track miles [4.8 km] to the west). Safety issues also played a part, as the former station was in a freight yard and what appears to be the station building is actually a Union Pacific yard office. Although the California Zephyr still passes through Sparks, it no longer stops at the station and freight operations continue under Union Pacific. Amtrak Thruway bus services stop nearby at the Nugget Casino Resort.

Union Pacific demolished the machine shop in 2024.

== See also ==
- Streetcars in Reno, Nevada – The Reno–Sparks streetcar line terminated outside of the station shops
