= Lovelock station =

Lovelock, NV
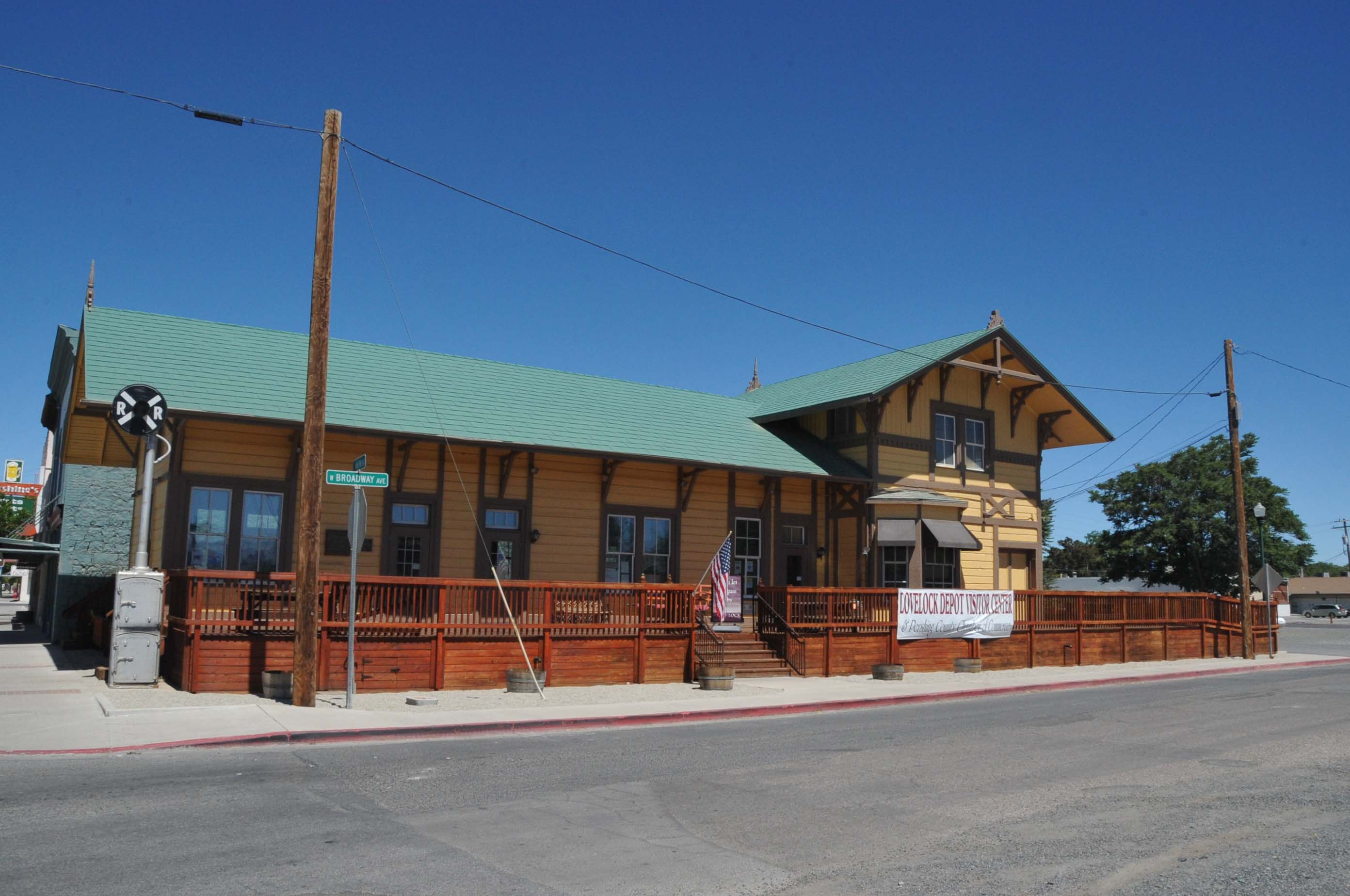
- Lovelock station in June 2014.

General information
- Location: 1005 West Broadway Avenue, Lovelock, Nevada 89419
- Line: Union Pacific Railroad

History
- Opened: 1880
- Closed: May 11, 1997

Former services
Preceding station	Amtrak	Following station
Sparks toward Emeryville	California Zephyr	Winnemucca toward Chicago
Preceding station	Southern Pacific Railroad	Following station
Hazen toward Oakland Pier	Overland Route	Oreana toward Ogden
- Central Pacific Railroad Depot
- U.S. National Register of Historic Places
- Location: 1005 W. Broadway Ave., Lovelock, Nevada
- Coordinates: 40°10′47″N 118°28′22″W
- Built: 1880
- Architect: Brown, Arthur; Central Pacific Railroad
- Architectural style: Stick/Eastlake
- NRHP reference No.: 04000300
- Added to NRHP: April 15, 2004
Location

The Central Pacific Railroad Depot in Lovelock, Nevada was erected in 1880 in the Stick style or Eastlake style, functioning as the principal point of access to the town in the late 19th and early 20th centuries. The building was originally located on the northeast corner of West Broadway Avenue and Main Street, but was moved by the town in 1999 to its present site across Broadway Avenue.

The building consists of two wood frame sections; a 1½ story section to the south comprising the baggage room, and a two-story section to the north containing the passenger waiting room, agent's office and agent's quarters. Both portions are extensively detailed with finials, braces, brackets and flat board trim. The depot was built to the Central Pacific Railroad's "Combination Depot #2" design, the only example of its type in Nevada, but one of six built on the Central Pacific system. None of the other five examples is known to have survived.

The station was a regular stop for transcontinental train traffic, and was expanded in 1917. The Amtrak California Zephyr stopped at the station until May 11, 1997. When what was now the Union Pacific Railroad announced plans to tear the depot down in 1998 the City of Lovelock expressed interest in the building. That year the railroad donated the building to the city along with $42,500, the projected cost of demolition. The town moved it from railroad property, completing a restoration in 2000, with help from prison labor. It was placed on the National Register of Historic Places in 2004. The depot is leased to private retail businesses.
