= Reno station =

Amtrak intercity train station in Reno, Nevada

Reno, NV
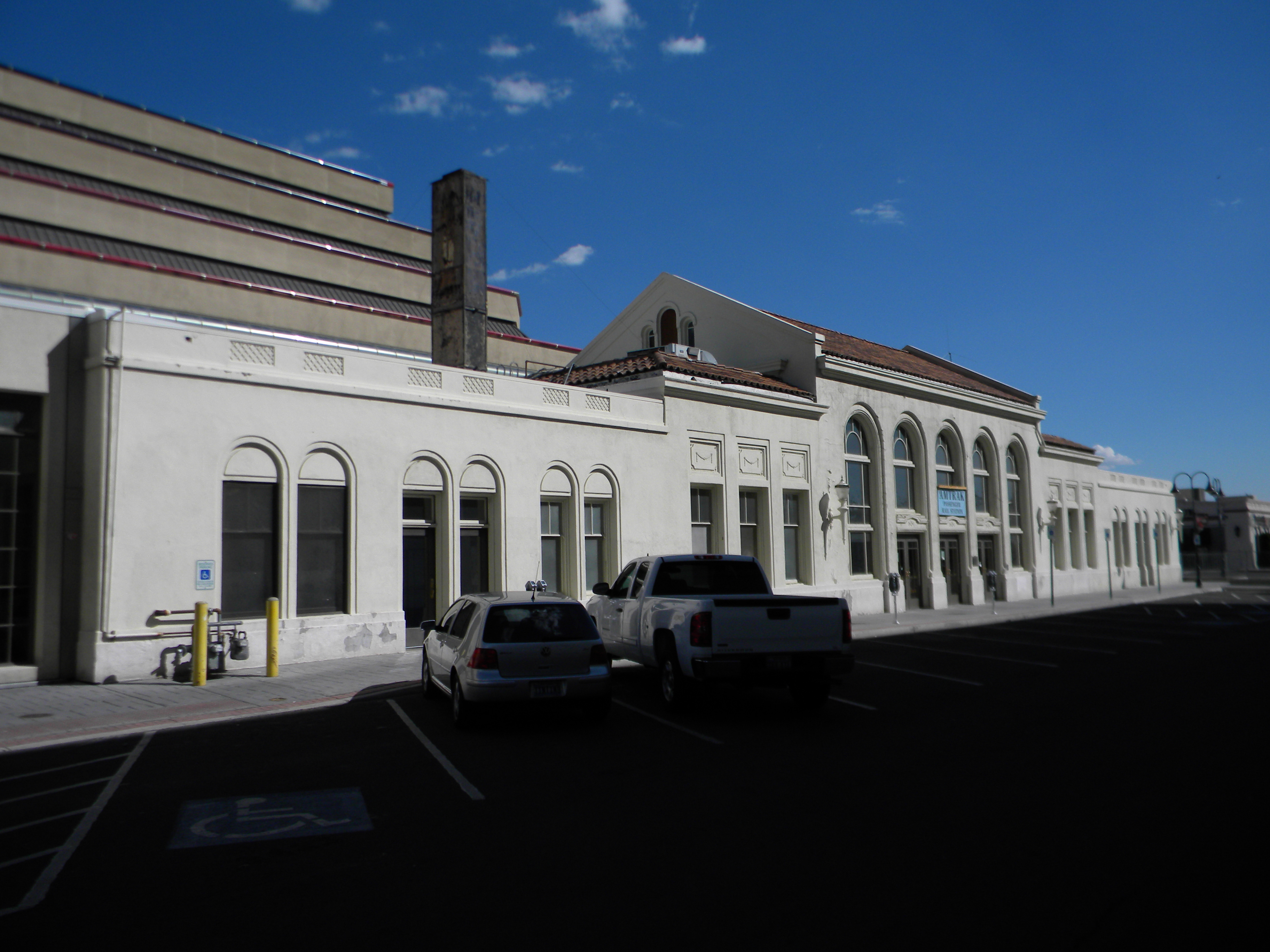
- Station house, 2014

General information
- Location: 280 Commercial Row; Reno, Nevada; United States
- Owner: Structure: City of Reno; Trackage: Union Pacific Railroad
- Line: Union Pacific Roseville Subdivision
- Platforms: 1 side platform
- Tracks: 2

Construction
- Structure type: Below grade
- Parking: None
- Accessible: yes

Other information
- Station code: Amtrak: RNO

History
- Opened: 1868
- Rebuilt: 1879; December 1889; 1926; 2007

Passengers
- FY 2025: 62,827 (Amtrak)

Services
Preceding station	Amtrak	Following station
Truckee toward Emeryville	California Zephyr	Winnemucca toward Chicago
Former services
Preceding station	Amtrak	Following station
Truckee toward Emeryville	California Zephyr	Sparks closed in 2009 toward Chicago
Preceding station	Southern Pacific Railroad	Following station
Verdi toward Oakland Pier	Overland Route	Sparks toward Ogden
Preceding station	Virginia and Truckee Railroad	Following station
Terminus	Main Line	Andersons toward Virginia City
Narrow gauge station (until 1910)
Preceding station	Nevada–California–Oregon Railway	Following station
Terminus	Main Line	Summit toward Lakeview
- Reno Southern Pacific Railroad Depot
- U.S. National Register of Historic Places
- Location: 280 Commercial Row; Reno, Nevada
- Coordinates: 39.5287°N 119.8116°W
- Built: 1926
- Architects: Ryberg-Sorensen; Southern Pacific RR
- Architectural style: Mission/Spanish Revival
- NRHP reference No.: 12000929
- Added to NRHP: November 12, 2012
Location

Reno station is an Amtrak intercity train station in Reno, Nevada, served by the California Zephyr train. It is also serviced by five times per weekday, and twice on weekends, by Amtrak Thruway routes to Sacramento.

== Description ==
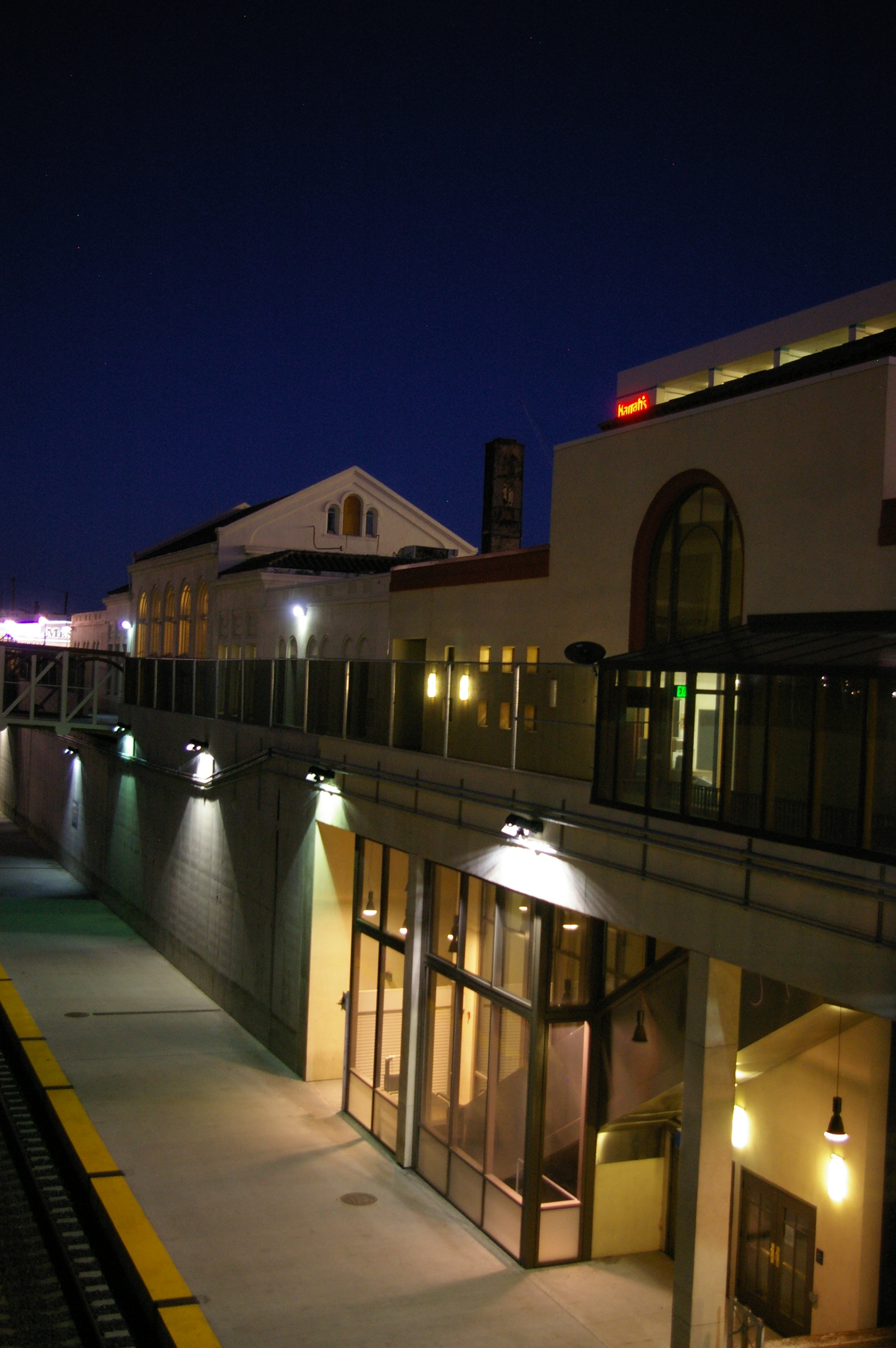
The back of the depot with escalator to the depressed tracks

The station is located at 280 North Center Street in downtown Reno. The tracks are owned by the Union Pacific Railroad, while the station and platform are owned by the city of Reno. The station does not have a parking lot. The tracks are placed below ground level as they pass through the heart of downtown Reno. As of 2014, the station was served by the once-daily California Zephyr, running between Chicago and Emeryville, California (in the San Francisco Bay Area). (Note: As of January 13, 2014, the westbound train (Route 5) is scheduled to stop at 9:36 am and the eastbound train (Route 6) is scheduled to stop at 4:06 pm.) The previous year, the station served 78,827 passengers, or about 216 per day. The station is popular with passengers traveling in both directions between Northern California and Reno.

Three Amtrak Thruway routes, two originating at the station and one at the Nugget Casino Resort in Sparks, connect the station to Sacramento.

== History ==
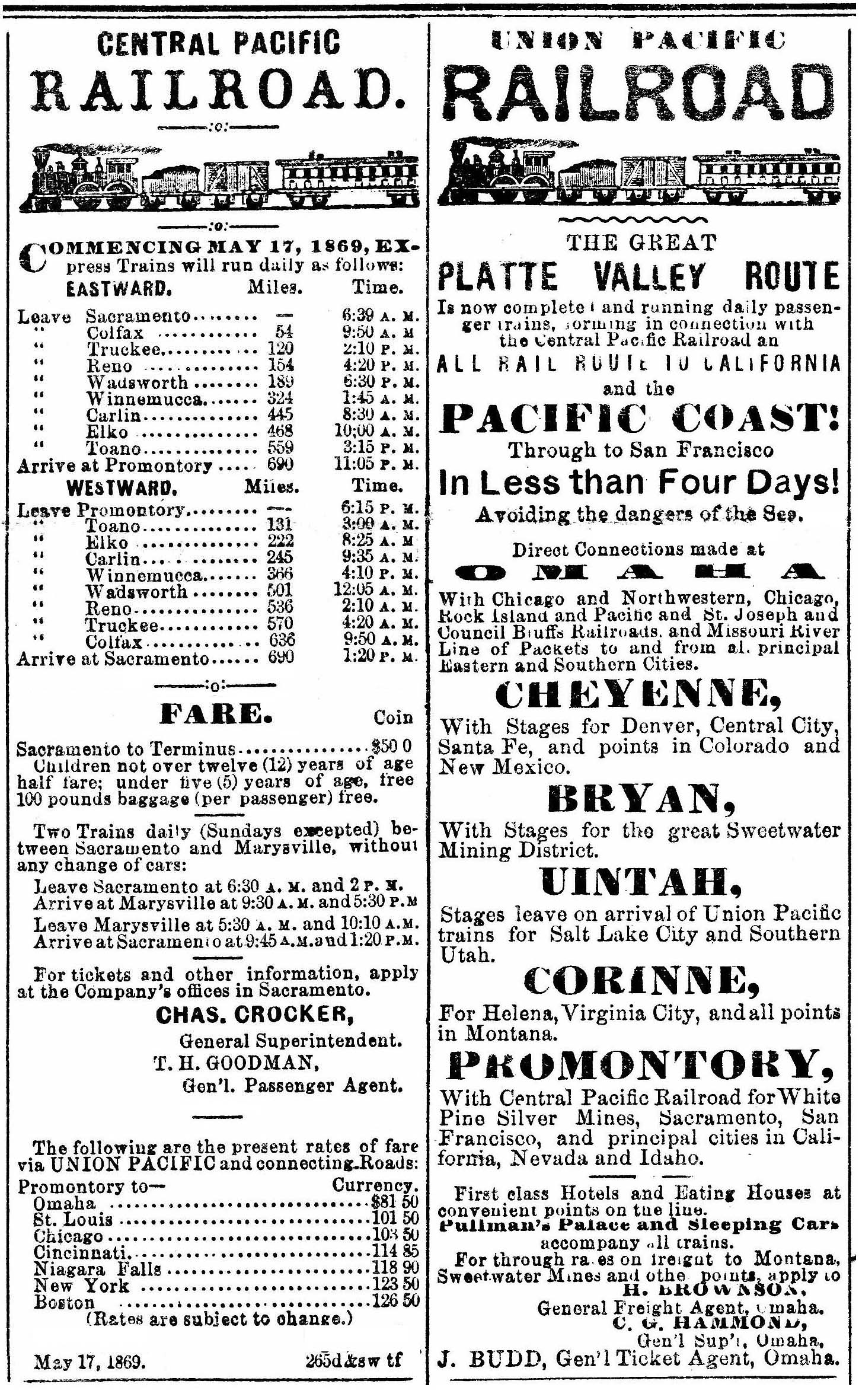
The Salt Lake Daily Telegraph ad dated May 17, 1869

A depot has existed at this location since the first transcontinental railroad arrived in Reno in 1868; the Central Pacific Railroad opened through the area on June 19. The Virginia and Truckee Railroad additionally served the station after the line from Carson City was completed in 1872. The first station was temporary, lasting only a few months before being replaced by the Depot Hotel, a combination structure which also featured a restaurant. The hotel was likely a joint venture between the Central Pacific and a local proprietor. After surviving several fires, it eventually succumbed to the March 1879 Reno fire but was quickly rebuilt. The second Depot Hotel would, itself, burn down on May 1889 and the railroad decided to exit the hotel business in Reno. That December, a new one-story depot opened which also housed a Wells Fargo office. Southern Pacific went on to expand the facility, adding gendered waiting rooms.

Before 1910, the Nevada–California–Oregon Railway depot in Reno was located immediately to the north of the Southern Pacific station. The Western Pacific Railroad provided service to Reno after their acquisition of the NCO in Nevada, but never used this station — instead using the (now disused for rail service) Nevada–California–Oregon Railroad Depot, a few blocks to the east. The Southern Pacific Depot was also the terminus of Reno's street railways: Reno Traction Company streetcars and the Nevada Interurban served the station between 1908 and 1925.

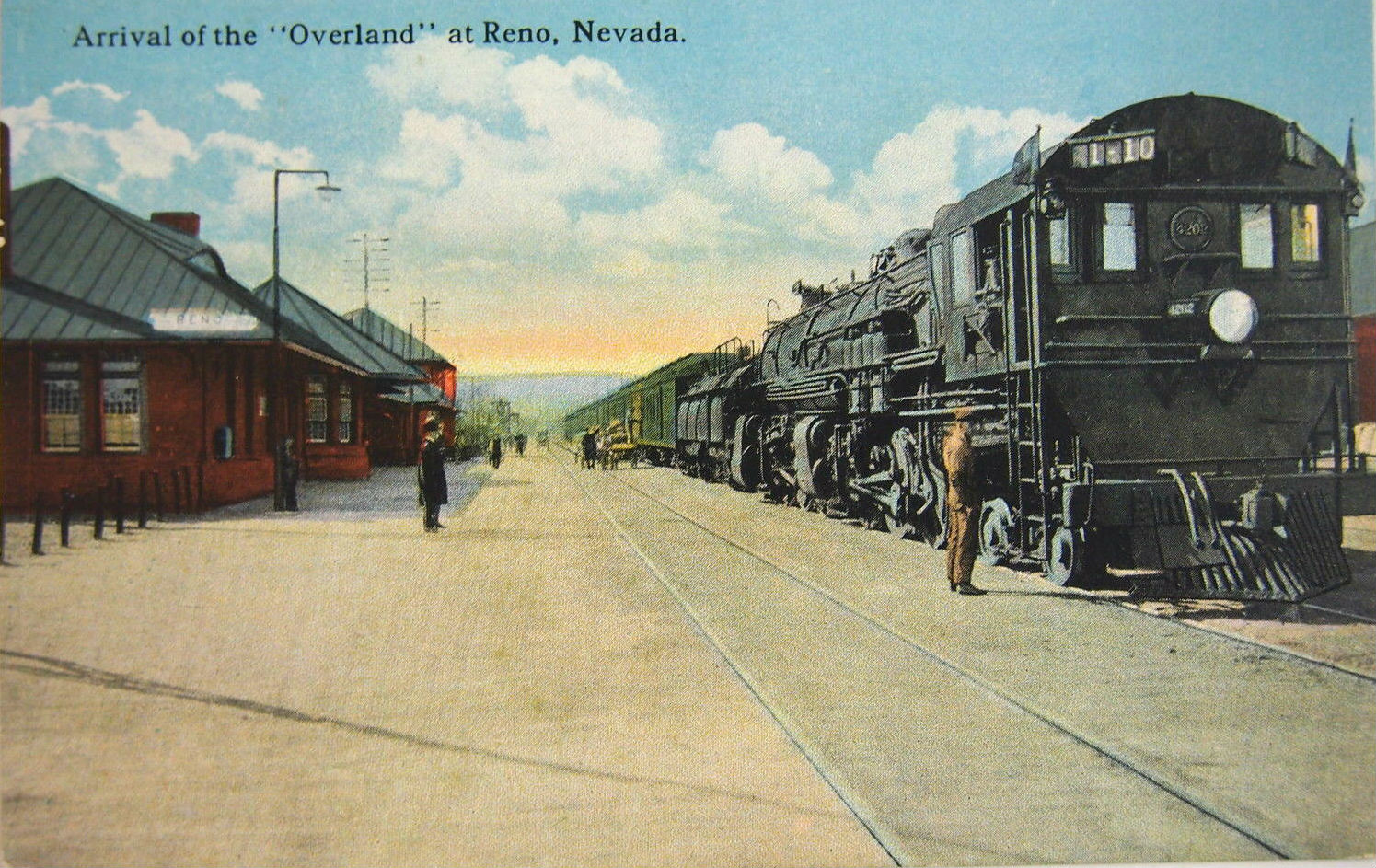
The Overland at the fourth incarnation of the Reno station, c. late-1910s.

Locals began calling for a more grand station building as early as 1910. The current stucco depot was built by the Southern Pacific Railroad in 1926. The new building reused bricks which had been used by the previous structure. The Virginia and Truckee utilized the station until 1950, when the railroad ceased operations.

=== ReTRAC ===
The station was enlarged in 2007 as part of the Reno Transportation Rail Access Corridor (ReTRAC) project, which grade separated the tracks to mostly eliminate grade crossings in downtown Reno. In the process of excavating around the depot, many artifacts from Reno's past were discovered including a long filled-in pedestrian tunnel and a previously unknown basement at a former masonic lodge. Many items from the excavation are on display in the station lobby, including an old cistern used by the fire department, a horse watering fountain, Native American artifacts, and several bottles dating as far back as the 1860s. As part of the renovation, Amtrak moved most of its operations to a glass-enclosed addition near the trench, though passengers can still use the original waiting area.

On December 4, 2012, it was announced that the station would be placed on the National Register of Historic Places.

== See also ==
- Nevada-California-Oregon Railroad Depot – former Western Pacific Reno station
