= Colfax station =

Amtrak station in Northern California

Colfax, CA
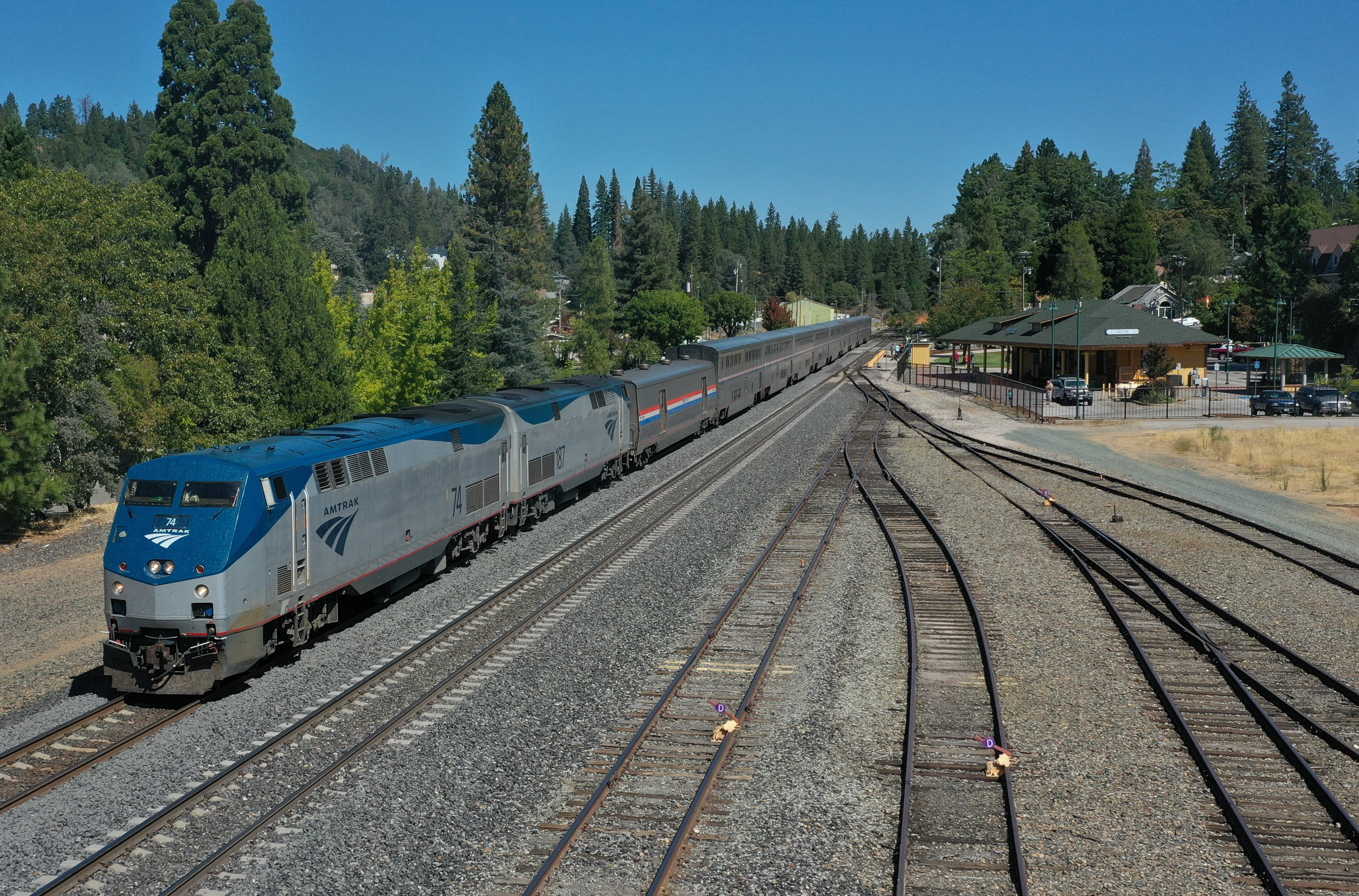
- The westbound California Zephyr at Colfax in 2019

General information
- Location: 99 Railroad Street at Church Street; Colfax, California; United States
- Coordinates: 39.0994°N 120.9531°W
- Line: Union Pacific Roseville Subdivision
- Platforms: 1 side platform
- Tracks: 2
- Connections: Amtrak Thruway 20; Placer County Transit 60

Construction
- Parking: Free

Other information
- Station code: Amtrak: COX

History
- Opened: c. 1865
- Rebuilt: 1905; Early 2000s
- Original company: Central Pacific Railroad

Passengers
- FY 2025: 6,615 (Amtrak)

Services
Preceding station	Amtrak	Following station
Roseville toward Emeryville	California Zephyr	Truckee toward Chicago
Former services
Preceding station	Amtrak	Following station
Auburn toward San Jose	Capitol Corridor 1998–2000	Terminus
Preceding station	Nevada County Narrow Gauge Railroad	Following station
Terminus	Main Line	Oilville toward Nevada City
Preceding station	Southern Pacific Railroad	Following station
Lander toward Oakland Pier	Overland Route	Cape Horn toward Ogden
- Colfax Passenger Station
- U.S. National Register of Historic Places
- NRHP reference No.: 98001605
- Colfax Freight Station
- U.S. National Register of Historic Places
- NRHP reference No.: 99001564
Location

Colfax station is an Amtrak train station in Colfax, California. Served by the California Zephyr, it is unstaffed. The station was built in 1905 by the Southern Pacific Railroad and was restored in the early 21st century; in addition to a waiting room, the building also houses the Colfax Heritage Museum. The platform is movable to accommodate Union Pacific rotary snowplows, which are liable to scrape a platform eight inches above top of rail.

== History ==
The first station built on the site opened around 1865. The Nevada County Narrow Gauge Railroad began service from here on April 11, 1876, running until 1942. The modern station was built in 1905.

Between January 1, 1998, and February 13, 2000, a single round-trip of the Capitol Corridor terminated at Colfax. This service ended because of low ridership.

The station building was listed on the National Register of Historic Places in 1999 as Colfax Passenger Station, with the 1880-built freight depot listed separately as Colfax Freight Station.

As of 2024, Amtrak plans to modify the platform for accessibility later in the 2020s.
