= Truckee station =

Amtrak train station in Truckee, California

Truckee, CA
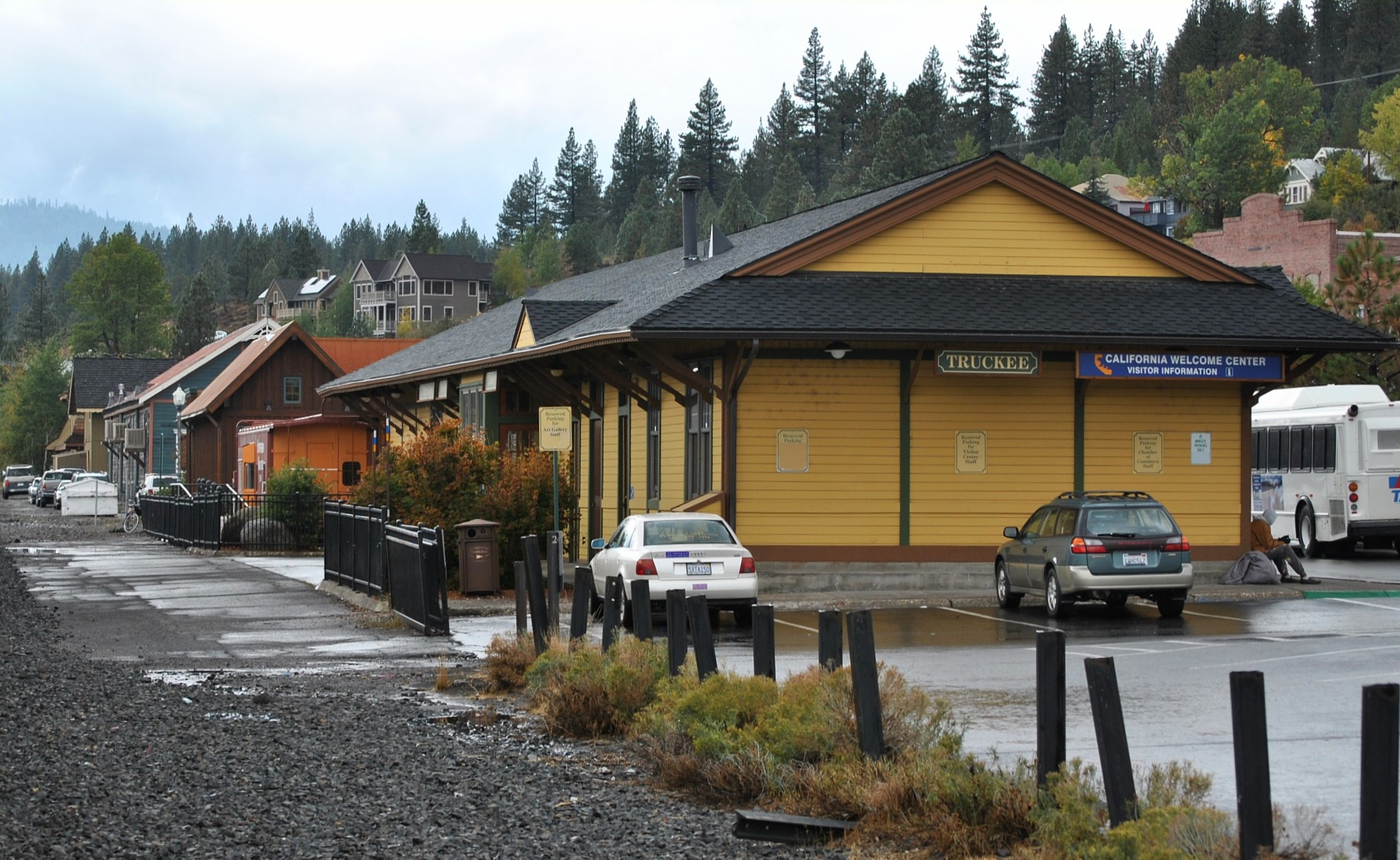
- The Truckee station building in 2010

General information
- Location: 10065 Donner Pass Road; Truckee, California
- Coordinates: 39.3275°N 120.1855°W
- Owner: Union Pacific
- Line: Union Pacific Roseville Subdivision
- Platforms: 1 side platform
- Tracks: 3
- Connections: Amtrak Thruway: 20; TART; Greyhound Lines

Other information
- Station code: Amtrak: TRU

History
- Opened: April 3, 1868
- Rebuilt: 1900
- Original company: Central Pacific Railroad

Passengers
- FY 2025: 16,496 (Amtrak)

Services
Preceding station	Amtrak	Following station
Colfax toward Emeryville	California Zephyr	Reno toward Chicago
Former services
Preceding station	Southern Pacific Railroad	Following station
Roseville toward Oakland Pier	Overland Route	Reno toward Ogden
Deer Creek toward Tahoe City	Lake Tahoe Railway	Terminus
Location

Truckee station is an Amtrak train station in Truckee, California.

It is currently served by one daily passenger train in each direction, the California Zephyr. The westbound train arrives in the morning from Chicago and Denver heading for Sacramento and Emeryville with the eastbound train calling in mid-afternoon. Truckee is also served by Amtrak's Thruway Motorcoaches which run three round trips a day between Sparks and connect to trains at Sacramento.

== History ==
The Central Pacific Railroad selected Truckee as the name of its railroad station by August 1867, even though the tracks would not reach the station until a year later. The first train to Truckee ran on April 3, 1868. The current station building was constructed in 1900.

In FY2012 Truckee was the 61st-busiest of the 74 Amtrak stations in California, boarding or detraining an average of about 26 passengers daily.

As of 2024, Amtrak plans to reconstruct the platform for accessibility in FY 2024 to FY 2026.

== Bus service ==
The station is served by daily Greyhound buses, and local Tahoe Truckee Area Regional Transit (TART).

== Platforms and tracks ==
1	■ California Zephyr	toward Emeryville (Colfax)
1	■ California Zephyr	toward Chicago (Reno)
2–3	■ Bypass/Freight line	No passenger service
