= Elko station =

Train station in Elko, Nevada

Elko, NV
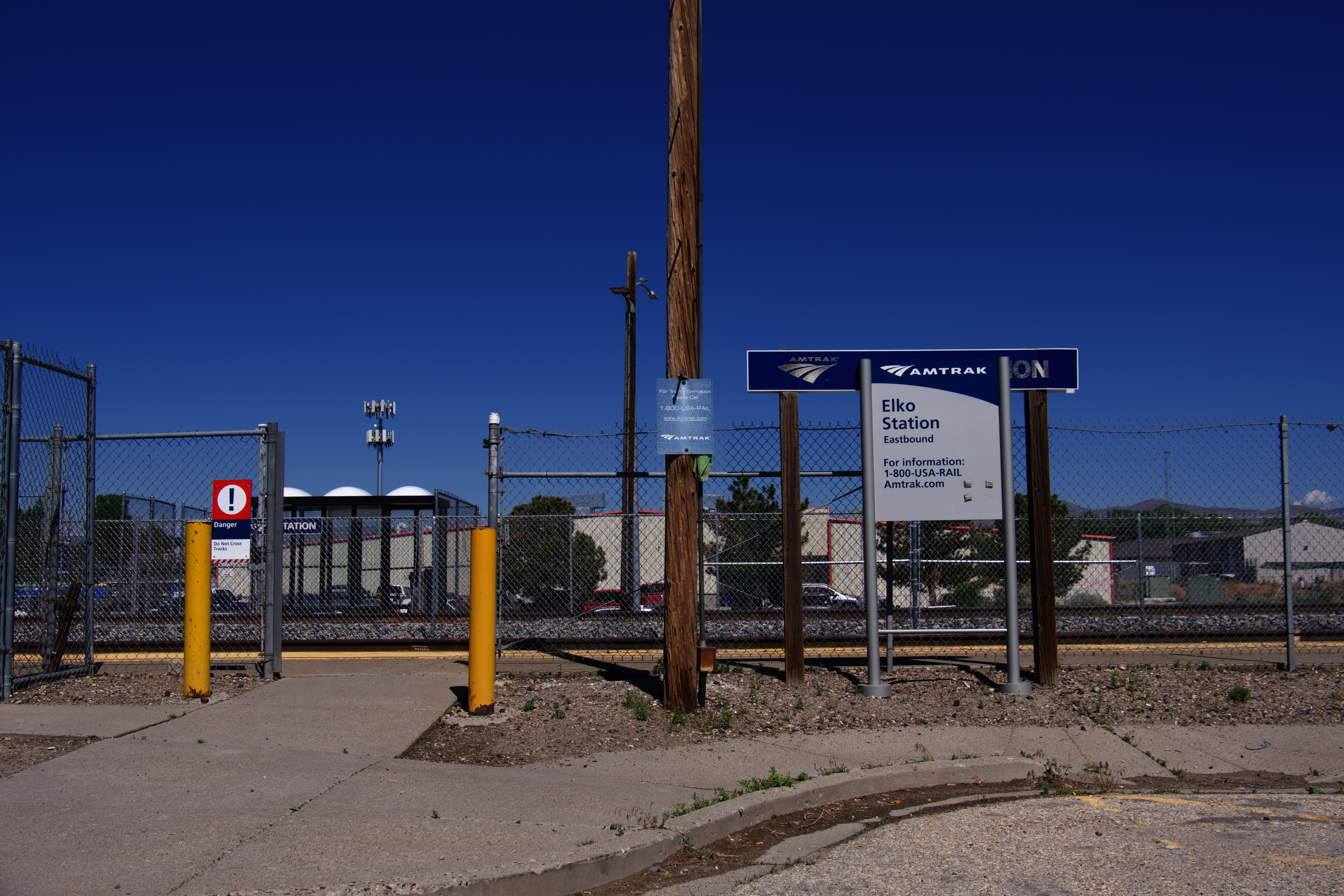
- Elko's eastbound passenger platform

General information
- Location: 1300 Water Street (westbound); 1301 Sharps Access Road (eastbound); Elko, Nevada 89801; United States
- Coordinates: 40.8364°N 115.7502°W
- Owner: Union Pacific Railroad
- Line: Elko Subdivision
- Platforms: 2 side platforms
- Tracks: 2

Construction
- Structure type: At-grade
- Parking: 20 long term spaces
- Accessible: Yes

Other information
- Station code: Amtrak: ELK

History
- Opened: 1984

Passengers
- FY 2025: 7,058 (Amtrak)

Services
Preceding station	Amtrak	Following station
Winnemucca toward Emeryville	California Zephyr	Salt Lake City toward Chicago
Former services
Preceding station	Western Pacific Railroad	Following station
Winnemucca toward Oakland	California Zephyr	Wendover toward Chicago
Carlin toward Oakland	Feather River Route	Halleck toward Salt Lake City
Preceding station	Southern Pacific Railroad	Following station
Palisade toward Oakland Pier	Overland Route	Cobre toward Ogden
Location

Elko station is a train station in Elko, Nevada. It is served by Amtrak's California Zephyr. (Note: As of January 1, 2020, the westbound train (Route 5) is scheduled to stop at 3:03 am and the eastbound train (Route 6) is scheduled to stop at 9:31 pm.)

The westbound platform is accessed from Water Street via 11th Street and the eastbound platform is accessed from Sharp Access Road via 12th Street (Water Street cannot be accessed directly from 12th Street). The station is owned by the Union Pacific Railroad and contains two enclosed shelters on two platforms, one on each side of the pair of tracks for each direction of travel. There are no services provided at the station (e.g., ticketing, restrooms, lounge, etc.).

== History ==
Elko was originally served by two train depots along two separate lines that ran through the downtown area. As the two lines were operated in a directional running setup, westbound trains used the Southern Pacific Railroad (SP) depot at 684 Railroad Street and eastbound trains used the Western Pacific Railroad (WP) depot at the corner of 3rd Street and Silver Street. The federal government funded a $43.5 million project to relocate the railroads to a grade-separated corridor along the Humboldt River, which was also rechanneled. The 2.8-mile (4.5 km) railroad corridor was opened in October 1983 and the Amtrak station was relocated to serve the new tracks. The current shelters became the Amtrak depots by 1984.
