= Winnemucca station =

Railway station in Winnemucca, Nevada, United States

Winnemucca, NV
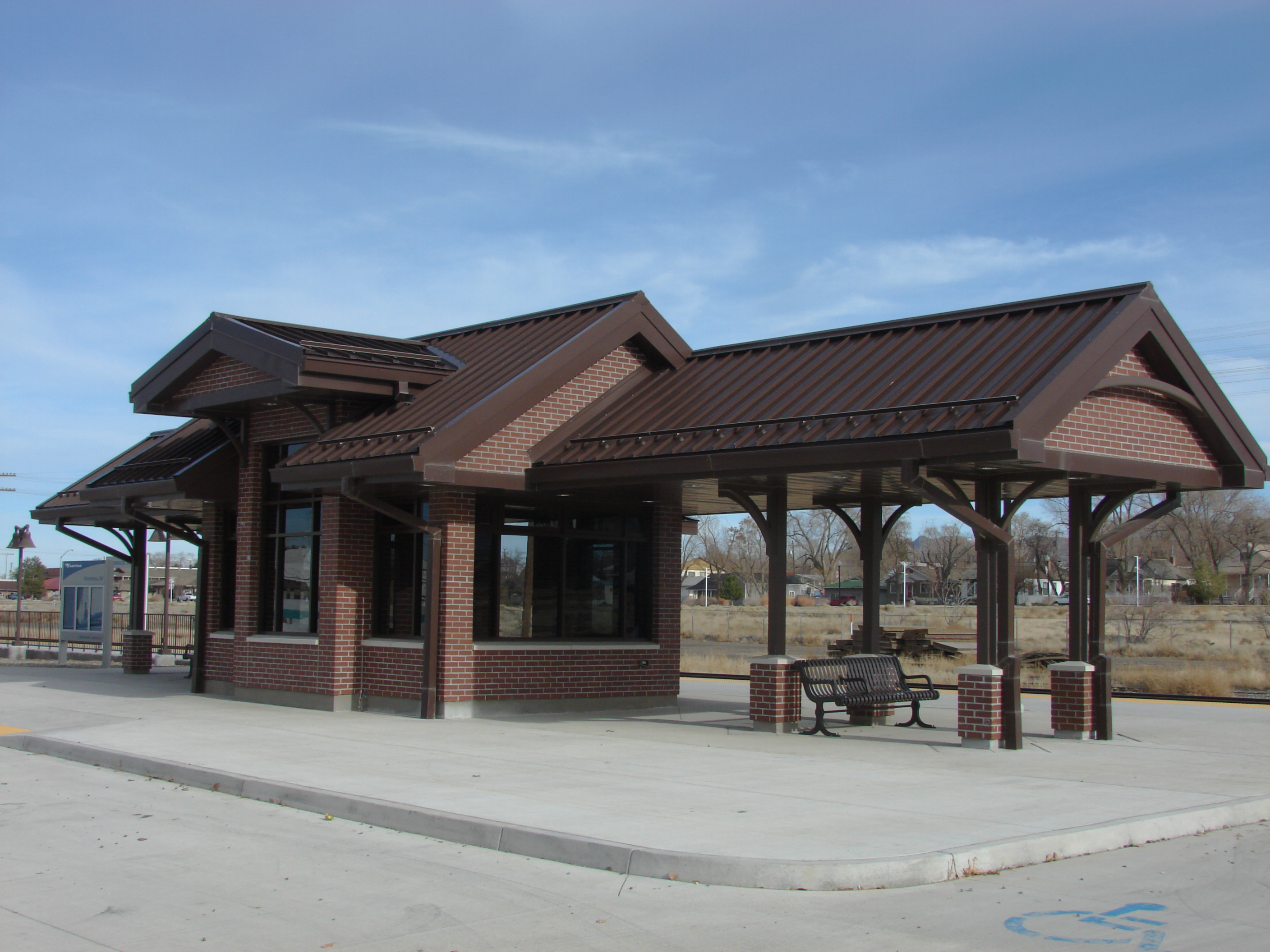
- Winnemucca station in November 2014

General information
- Location: 209 Railroad Street; Winnemucca, Nevada; United States
- Coordinates: 40°58′10″N 117°43′53″W
- Owner: Union Pacific Railroad
- Line: Elko Subdivision
- Platforms: 1 side platform
- Tracks: 2

Construction
- Parking: 4 long term spaces
- Accessible: Yes

Other information
- Station code: Amtrak: WNN

History
- Opened: 1868
- Rebuilt: 1993; 2012

Passengers
- FY 2025: 5,230 (Amtrak)

Services
Preceding station	Amtrak	Following station
Reno toward Emeryville	California Zephyr	Elko toward Chicago
Former services
Preceding station	Southern Pacific Railroad	Following station
Oreana toward Oakland Pier	Overland Route	Battle Mountain toward Ogden
Location

Winnemucca station is an Amtrak train station in Winnemucca, Nevada. It is served by one daily train in each direction on the California Zephyr.

== History ==
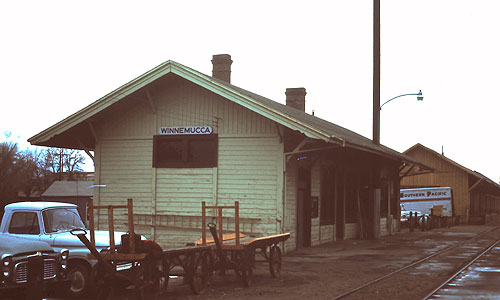
The former station in 1967

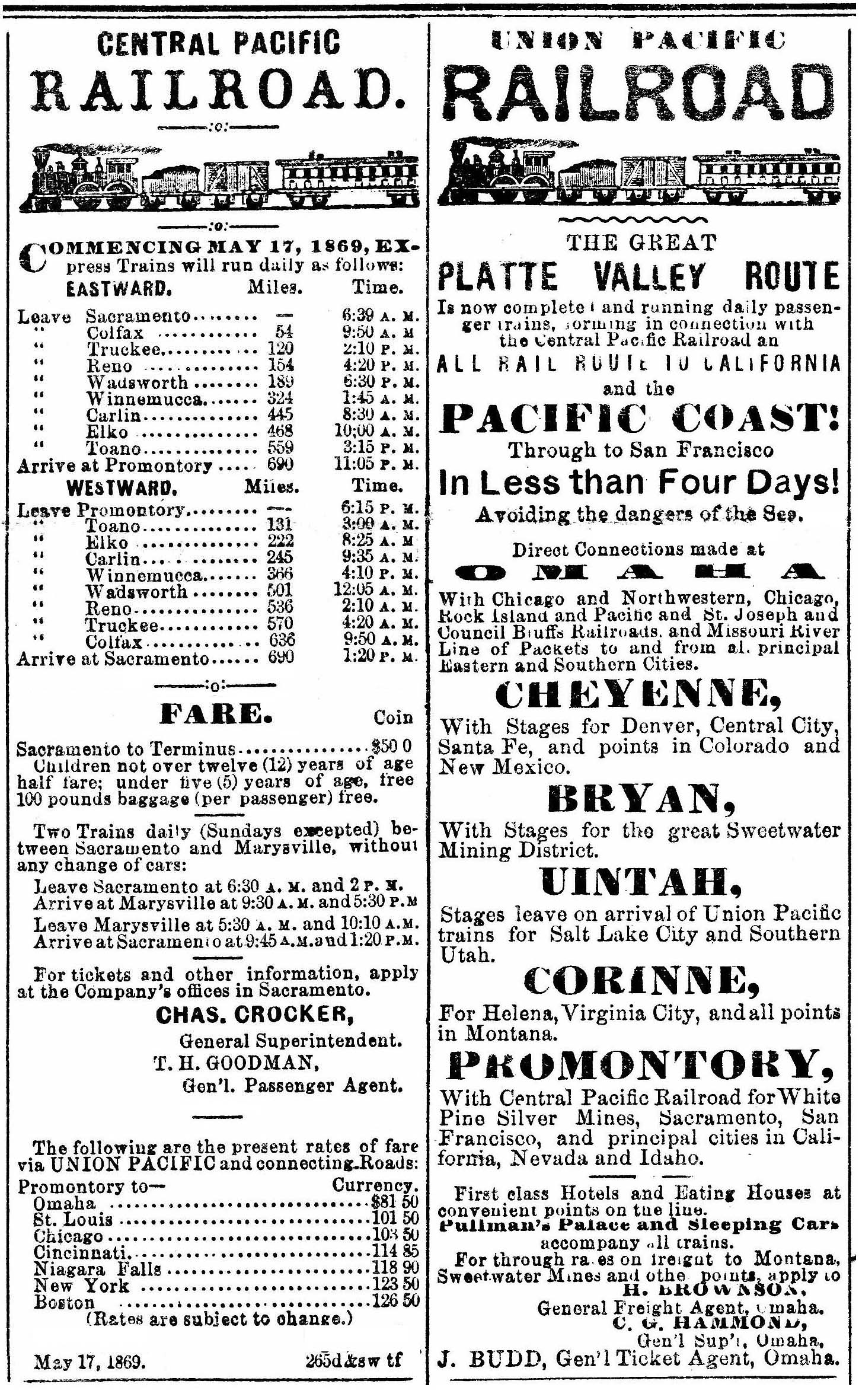
The Salt Lake Daily Telegraph ad dated May 17, 1869

The Central Pacific Railroad reached Winnemucca on September 16, 1868, and the first train arrived to the town on October 1. The line was later acquired by the Southern Pacific Railroad. The first transcontinental train rolled through on May 11, 1869. Amtrak took over intercity passenger rail service in the United States in May 1971 and service to Winnemucca continued on the City of San Francisco (later renamed San Francisco Zephyr, and later California Zephyr).

A small shelter was installed in 1993. In early 2012, a 550-foot-long (170 m) accessible platform and a brick station building were constructed for the station as part of a $1.26 million project (equivalent to $1.77 million today).
