= Streetcars in Reno, Nevada =

Transit system, 1904–1927

Streetcars in Reno

Operation
- Locale: Reno, Nevada, U.S.
- Open: November 1904
- Close: September 1927
- Status: Closed, dismantled
- Operators: Nevada Transit Company (1904–06); Reno Traction Company (1906–27); Nevada Interurban (1907–1920)

Infrastructure
- Propulsion system: Electric
- Electrification: Overhead line, 550 V DC; Overhead line, 600 V DC (Nevada Interurban)

For over two decades in the early twentieth century, streetcars served as the main mode of public transit in Reno, Nevada, United States. The system consisted of a streetcar network in the area of Reno and Sparks, Nevada, as well as an interurban line between Reno and the Moana Springs resort.

Reno's streetcar network operated from Thanksgiving Day in 1904 to September 1927. The early twentieth century streetcar network in Reno is the only streetcar or light rail system that has ever operated in the state of Nevada.

== History ==
=== Background ===
There were only a few settlers in the Reno area after 1850, until the discovery of silver in the Comstock Lode which led to a silver rush in the area and resulted in more settlers in Reno. By January 1863, the Central Pacific Railroad (CPRR) had begun laying tracks east from Sacramento, California, in order to connect with the Union Pacific Railroad at Promontory, Utah, and form the first transcontinental railroad. Once the railroad station was established, the town of Reno officially came into being on May 9, 1868. In 1871, Reno became the county seat of the newly expanded Washoe County, replacing the previous county seat, located at Washoe City.

After the opening of the Transcontinental Railroad, branch railroads began to connect with the first Transcontinental Railroad. For example, the Virginia and Truckee Railroad was extended to Reno in 1872, which provided a boost to the new city's economy. These railroads hauled lumber from Carson City to the mines, and ore from the mines out to the main Transcontinental Railroad. In 1885, the University of Nevada (then called Nevada State University) moved from Elko to Reno.

Franchises were granted to various business groups for street railways in Reno during the late 1800s, though these and other less-serious schemes to bring streetcar service to the city at that time went unrealized.

=== Reno's streetcar system ===
By the early 1900s, Sparks, Nevada was being developed after the Central Pacific moved their shops there from Wadsworth. A group of local businessmen organized and would go on to win a franchise to build an electric streetcar line connecting Reno and the new town. Minimal construction began in February 1904, though the franchise and companies organized to build the line (as well as their related real estate development interests) were purchased by a businessman based in Fresno. As this scheme stagnated, local business leaders called for a special election to award a new franchise to a local entity, which was granted. The Nevada Traction Company was organized to build and operate the line, with their construction beginning in late September. The first service ran from Fourth and Lake in Reno to the Southern Pacific roundhouse in Sparks, opening with a celebration on Thanksgiving Day 1904.

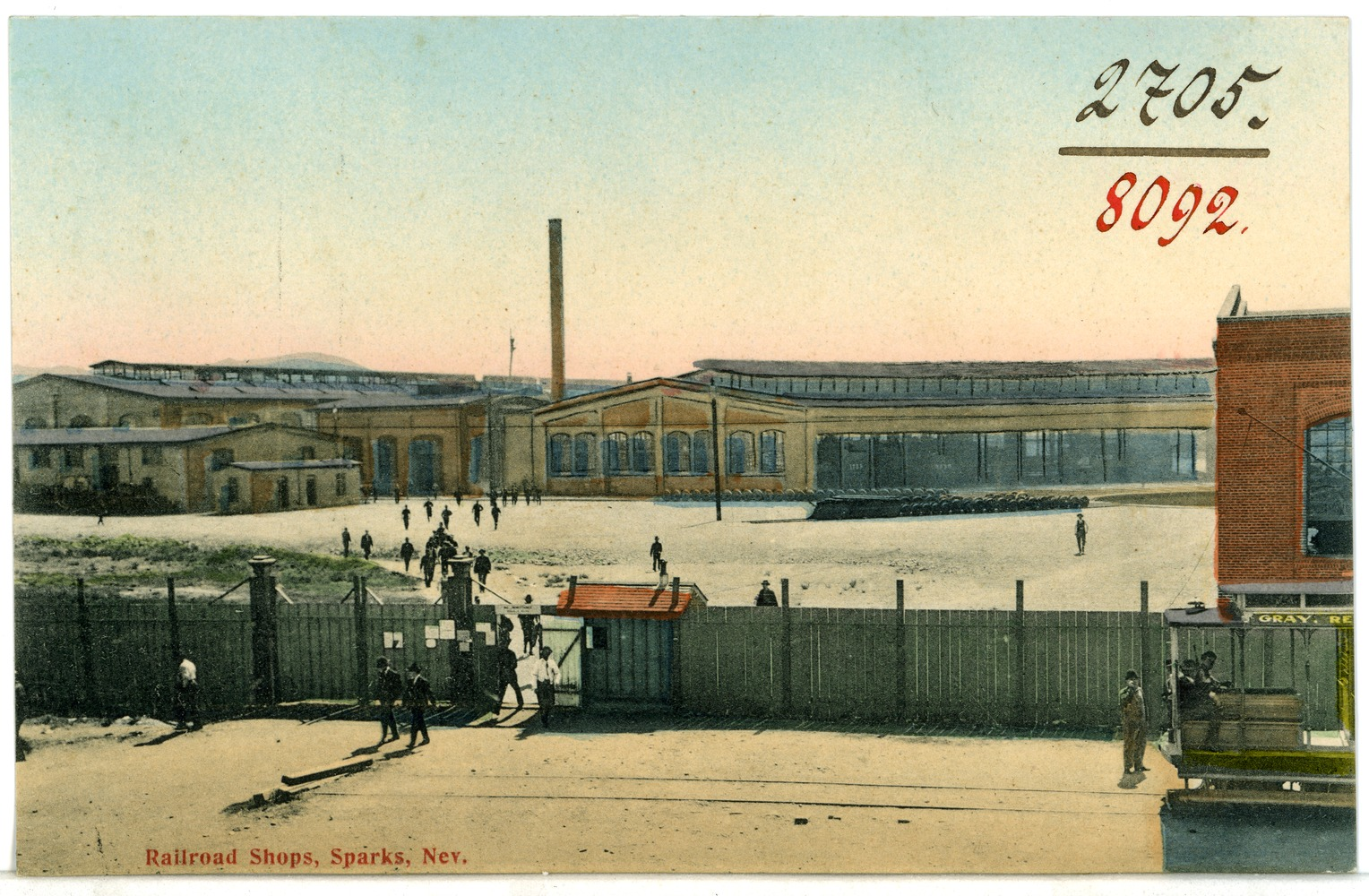
Southern Pacific's Sparks Railroad Shops were the eastern terminus of the Reno-Sparks line – a streetcar can be seen cut off at the bottom right of frame with tracks crossing at the front of the field (bottom) and suddenly ending with a rudimentary stopblock at bottom left. Postcard from 1906

This initial streetcar line, 4.5 miles (7.2 km) in length, ran from Reno's downtown railway node eastward to Sparks, turning south just before Deer Park, then east to run to the Southern Pacific roundhouse and railroad yards. The portion of the line in Reno proper traveled west along Fourth Street to Sierra Street, then south to Second Street, east to Virginia Street, and south again to the Truckee River. The route was extended over the Truckee River on the Virginia Street Bridge on New Years Day 1905, narrowly avoiding violating the terms of the franchise when the first car ran over the line as fireworks were going off in celebration near midnight. The car barn for the streetcar company stood at 911 E. 4th Street, near Morrill Avenue. Rolling stock initially consisted of three streetcars, purchased in San Francisco and painted yellow. Two additional cars built by the St. Louis Car Co. (which had been displayed at the Louisiana Purchase Exposition) went into service in April 1905. Overhead wire was electrified at 550 V DC.

The streetcar service was purchased in 1906 and was renamed the Reno Traction Company. The Second Street extension line opened on December 30, though its first day of service was cut short when the car overran the end of the line due to heavy snow late in the day. The line up Sierra Street and Ninth Street to the University of Nevada, Reno opened on September 2, 1907. Two further extensions followed around the end of the decade: a new line to a subdivision on Wells Street via Moran and the Ralston Street line both opened in early 1910. One additional temporary streetcar line was operated during the summers along Alameda Street (later Wells) from Fourth Street to the racing grounds — rails were laid at the beginning of the season and taken up several months later with a streetcar temporarily shoo-flied in for service.

Streetcars were used heavily by commuting workers, shoppers, and pleasure-seekers headed to Wieland’s Park (later known as Coney Island), with the Reno-Sparks line being by far the most popular and generating 80% of all ridership. With an initial fare of ten cents, (Note: equivalent to $3.58 in 2025 adjusted for inflation) the journey from Reno to Sparks took approximately thirty minutes, with the streetcar traveling at just 10 miles per hour (16 km/h).

=== Interurban to Moana ===
A separate company, the Nevada Interurban, offered interurban service southward along Plumas Street to the Moana Springs resort. Cars began running on November 3, 1907. Electrification differed from the Reno Traction Company's, necessitating a second set of wires with a 600-volt direct current to be strung along the streets where both companies shared tracks. L. W. Berrum took over the railway in 1913 and began operating it with his older children as motormen (with their sister, Marie, taking up the job during World War I). The familial nature of the operations was seen as an asset and cost savings measure.

=== Decline ===
The increasing popularity of automobiles, as well as the high cost of track maintenance, soon led to the decline of streetcars in Reno. The last few years of the Nevada Interurban's life would see service ceased in the winter due to a lack of riders. Reno Traction refused to renew their trackage agreements with the Interurban in 1919. This left the northern end of the Nevada Interurban truncated at California Street, though its final run occurred later that fall. Facing declining patronage, the Reno Traction Company discontinued every route in Reno in 1919, except for the Reno-Sparks line. Tracks and wires were removed in July 1920 after the city declined an offer to lease the lines.

Intercity bus service between Reno and Sparks began on June 15, 1927, attracting away the remaining streetcar line's customers. Operations on the Reno-Sparks line ended soon afterwards, in September 1927. This was the end of Reno's over two decade experiment with a streetcar system. Neither the streetcar ventures or the interurban line were ever confirmed to have paid dividends to investors.

== Potential streetcar revival discussions ==
On October 11, 2009, Reno opened up a new bus rapid transit (BRT) line called RTC Rapid along Virginia Street, sharing a portion of its route with Reno's original streetcar line. Around the time of the opening of the RTC Rapid line, some discussions of ultimately converting the BRT line to a streetcar line arose. However, there have been no further discussion of converting the BRT line to a streetcar line since that time, and there is no mention of building a streetcar line in Reno's long-range transportation plan.

== See also ==
- List of streetcar systems in the United States (all-time list)
