= California Zephyr =

Amtrak service between Chicago and the San Francisco Bay Area

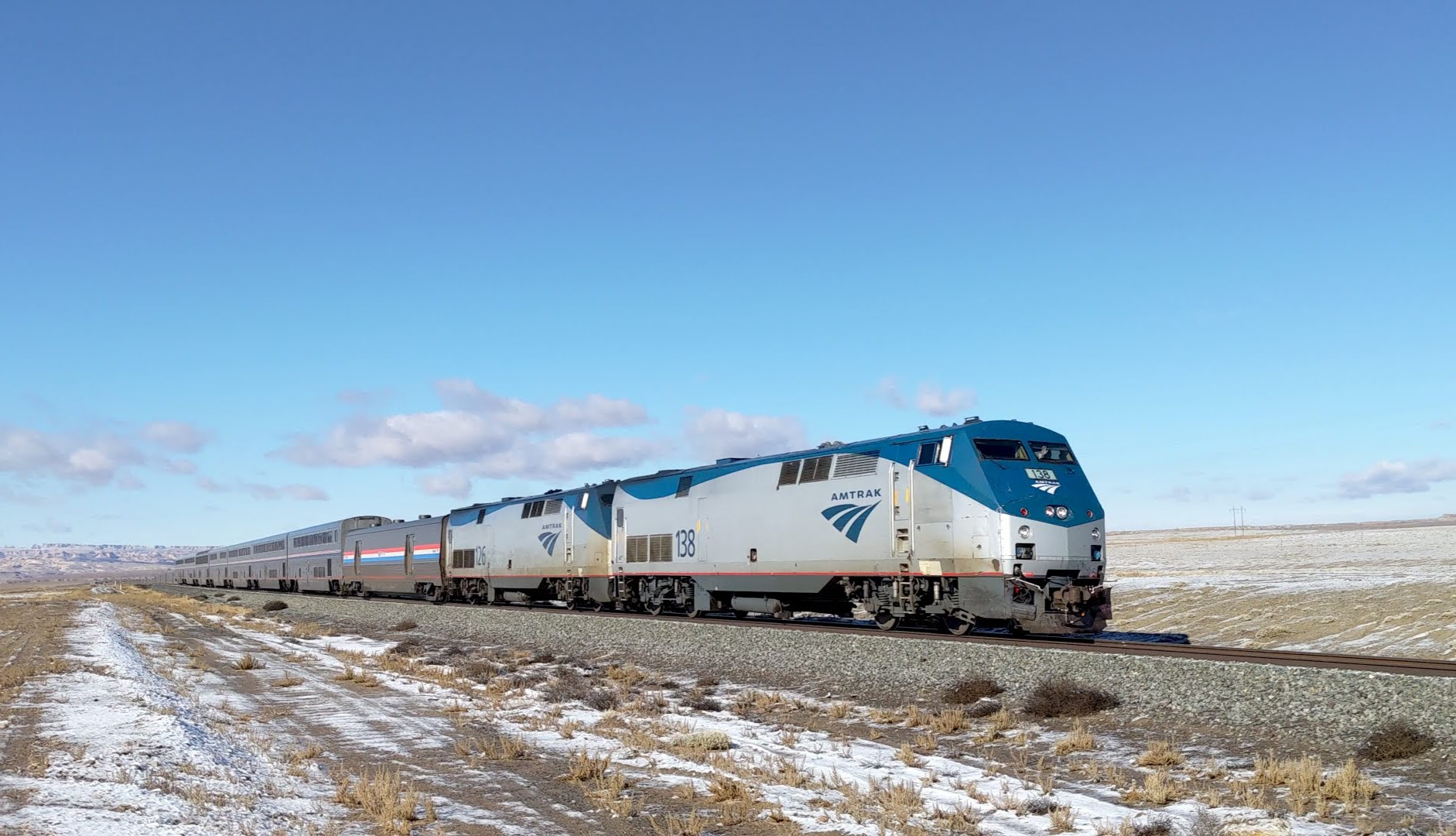
- The eastbound California Zephyr near Green River, Utah, in 2023

Overview
- Service type: Inter-city rail
- Locale: Western United States
- Predecessor: City of San Francisco (1936–1971); California Zephyr (1949–1970); San Francisco Chief (1954–1971); Rio Grande Zephyr (1970–1983); Denver Zephyr (1971–1973); San Francisco Zephyr (1972–1983)
- First service: July 16, 1983
- Current operator: Amtrak
- Annual ridership: 403,142 (FY 25) ▲14.8% (Note: Amtrak's Fiscal Year (FY) runs from October 1 of the prior year to September 30 of the named year.)

Route
- Termini: Chicago, Illinois; Emeryville, California
- Stops: 35
- Distance travelled: 2,438 miles (3,924 km)
- Average journey time: 52 hours, 14 minutes (eastbound); 52 hours, 57 minutes (westbound)
- Service frequency: Daily
- Train numbers: 5 (westbound); 6 (eastbound)

On-board services
- Classes: Coach Class; First Class Sleeper Service
- Disabled access: Train lower level, most stations
- Sleeping arrangements: Roomette (2 beds); Bedroom (2 beds); Bedroom Suite (4 beds); Accessible Bedroom (2 beds); Family Bedroom (4 beds)
- Catering facilities: Dining car, Café
- Observation facilities: Sightseer lounge car
- Baggage facilities: Overhead racks, checked baggage available at selected stations

Technical
- Rolling stock: GE Genesis or Siemens ALC-42 locomotives; Superliner passenger cars
- Track gauge: 4 ft 8 1/2 in (1,435 mm) standard gauge
- Operating speed: Avg.: 55 mph (89 km/h); Top: 79 mph (127 km/h)
- Track owners: UP, BNSF

The California Zephyr is a long-distance passenger train operated by Amtrak between Chicago and the San Francisco Bay Area (at Emeryville), via Omaha, Denver, Salt Lake City, and Reno. At 2,438 miles (3,924 km), it is Amtrak's longest daily route, and second-longest overall after the Texas Eagle's triweekly continuation from San Antonio to Los Angeles, with travel time between the termini taking approximately 52 1/2 hours. Amtrak claims the route as one of its most scenic, with views of the upper Colorado River valley in the Rocky Mountains, and the Sierra Nevada. The modern train is the second iteration of a train named California Zephyr; the original train was privately operated and ran on a different route through Nevada and California.

During fiscal year 2023, the California Zephyr carried 328,458 passengers, an increase of 13.1% over FY2022, but down from its pre-COVID-19 pandemic ridership of 410,844 in FY2019. The train had a total revenue of $51,950,998 in FY2016, the last year that route-specific revenue data was given.

== History ==
=== Previous service ===
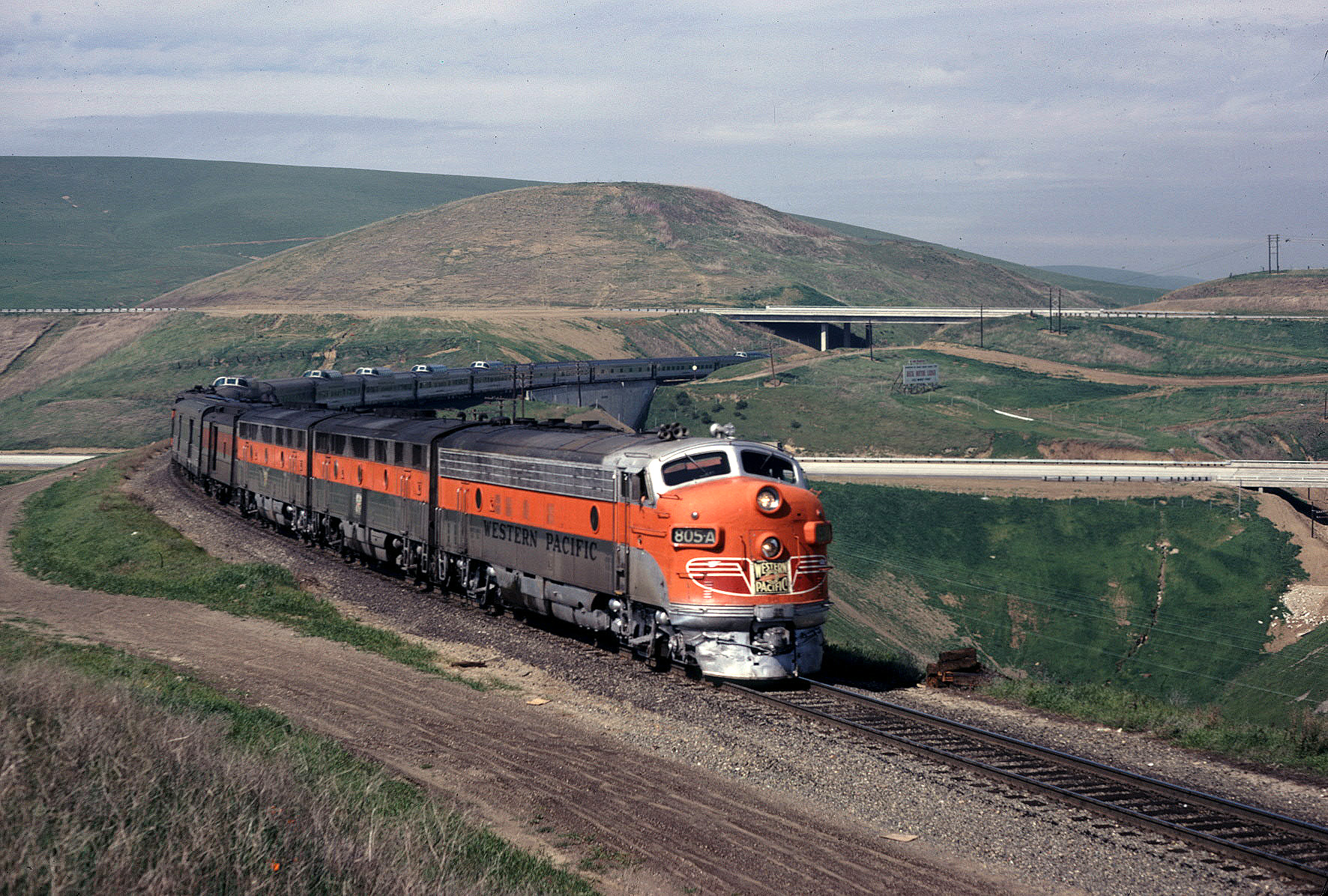
The eastbound California Zephyr on Altamont Pass in March 1970

Prior to the 1971 creation of Amtrak, three competing trains ran between Chicago and the East Bay, with bus connections to San Francisco:

- The original California Zephyr was operated by the Chicago, Burlington and Quincy Railroad (CB&Q), the Denver and Rio Grande Western Railroad (D&RGW), and the Western Pacific Railroad (WP). It operated between Chicago and Oakland – along what is today called the Central Corridor and Feather River Route – via Omaha, Denver, Salt Lake City and Oroville. Amid much fanfare and publicity, the California Zephyr was inaugurated on March 20, 1949. It was discontinued in March 1970 – the only one of the three trains not still operating when Amtrak took over service.
- The City of San Francisco was operated by the Chicago, Milwaukee, St. Paul and Pacific Railroad (Milwaukee Road), Union Pacific Railroad (UP), and Southern Pacific Railroad (SP). It operated between Chicago and Oakland on the Overland Route via Omaha, Cheyenne, Ogden and Reno.
- The San Francisco Chief was operated by the Atchison, Topeka and Santa Fe Railway (AT&SF) via the more southerly Southern Transcon. It operated between Chicago and Richmond, California via Kansas City, Amarillo, and Bakersfield.

Railpax (renamed Amtrak in late April 1971) originally intended to revive the California Zephyr as part of its original route network, using the Burlington Northern (ex-CB&Q) east of Denver, the DRG&W between Denver and Ogden, Utah, and the WP west of Ogden. The California Zephyr route would serve more populated areas (including Denver and Salt Lake City) than the Overland Route, would run through rural communities that lacked good highway access, and could attract passengers to its scenic routes.

However, since the WP had shed the last of its money-losing passenger service by terminating the California Zephyr, it was not eligible to participate in Amtrak's formation. On April 12, 1971, the WP refused to cooperate with Railpax, and the SP route between Ogden and Oakland was chosen instead.

On April 26, the D&RGW elected not to join Amtrak. The contract specified that Amtrak could later increase service, and D&RGW feared that would crowd its single-track mainline that competed with the UP's double-track route. The D&RGW chose to operate the Denver–Ogden Rio Grande Zephyr. Amtrak scrambled to piece together a Denver–Cheyenne–Ogden routing on the UP.

=== Amtrak ===
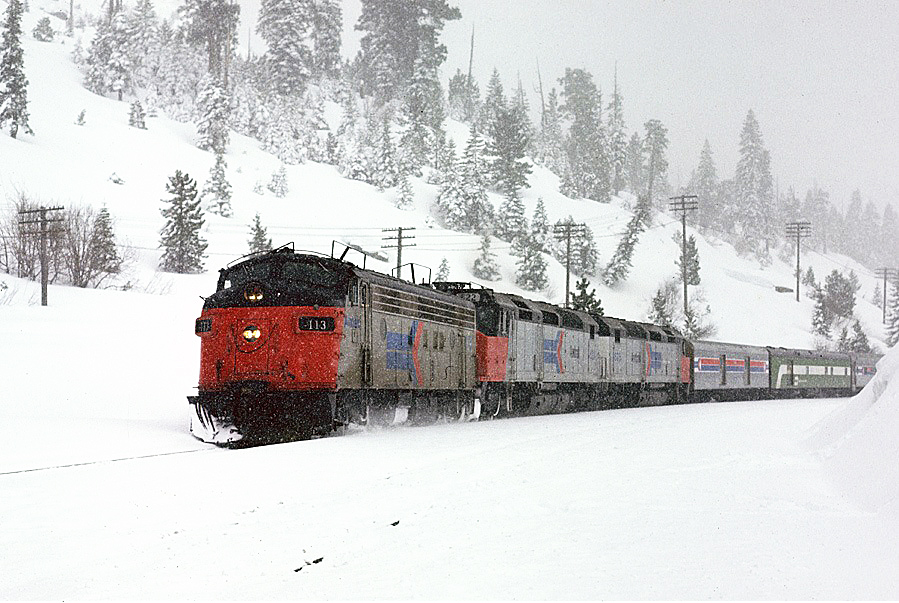
An EMD FP7 and two EMD SDP40Fs pull the eastbound San Francisco Zephyr through the Yuba Gap in 1975.

Between the spring of 1971 and the summer of 1972, passengers traveling between Chicago and Oakland would have to travel on two different trains: the Denver Zephyr, which operated daily between Chicago and Denver, and the City of San Francisco, which operated three times a week, between Denver and the San Francisco Bay Area. Eventually, however, after several false starts, Amtrak consolidated the two trains into one, dubbed the San Francisco Zephyr, homage to both the California Zephyr and the San Francisco Chief, between Chicago and Oakland. The Rio Grande continued to operate the Rio Grande Zephyr between Denver and Ogden. The San Francisco Zephyr and the Rio Grande Zephyr were scheduled as to facilitate a connection between them in Ogden, but not Denver.

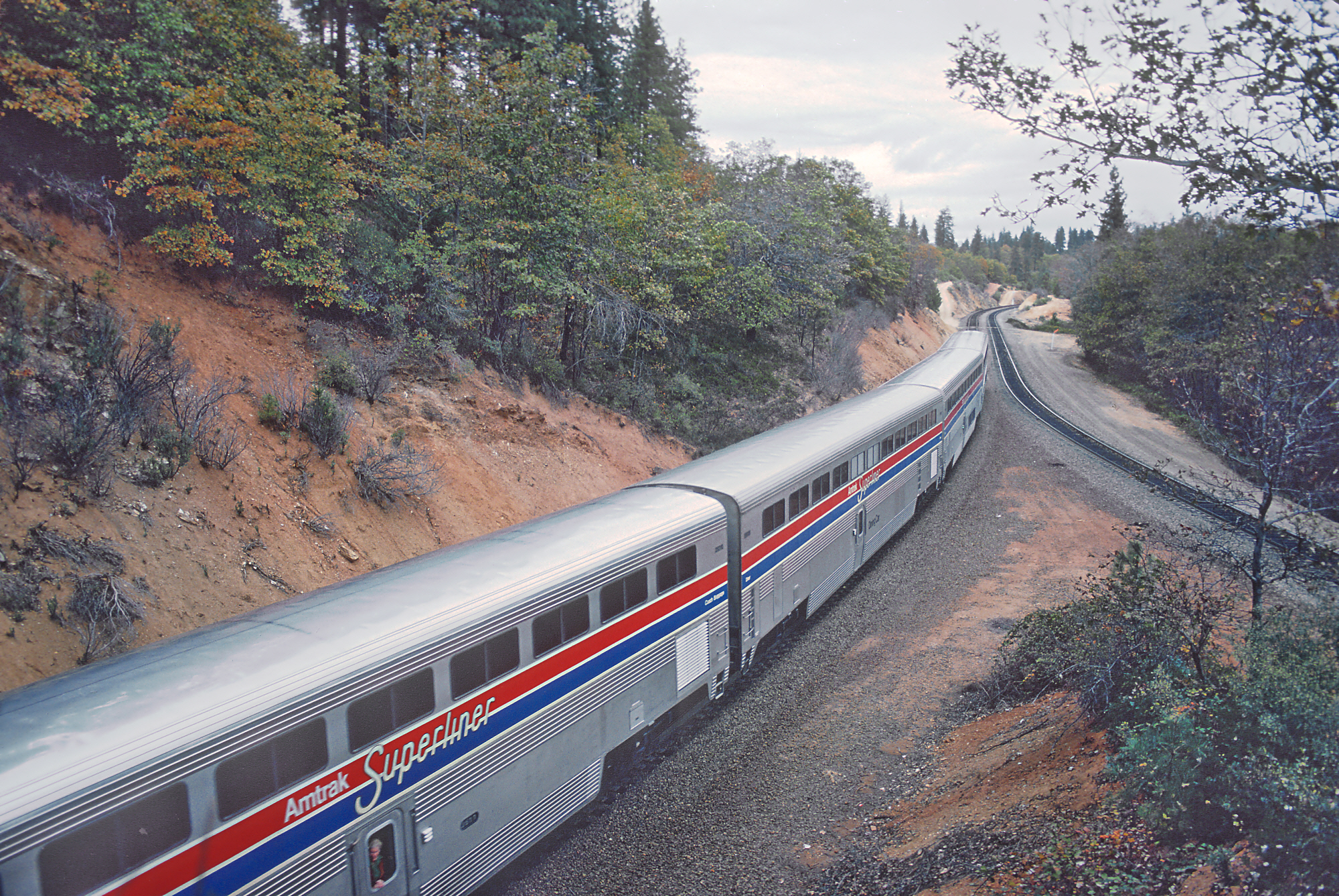
San Francisco Zephyr running with the new Superliner I cars in November 1980

In July 1980, the San Francisco Zephyr was outfitted with new bi-level Superliner I passenger cars built by Pullman-Standard – one of the last Amtrak's western long-distance trains to receive them – (already running with such cars were the Southwest Limited, Desert Wind and Empire Builder), and began exchanging through cars at Ogden with the Seattle–Chicago Pioneer and the Los Angeles–Chicago Desert Wind. Between Ogden and Chicago, the Zephyr, Desert Wind, and Pioneer operated as a combined train.

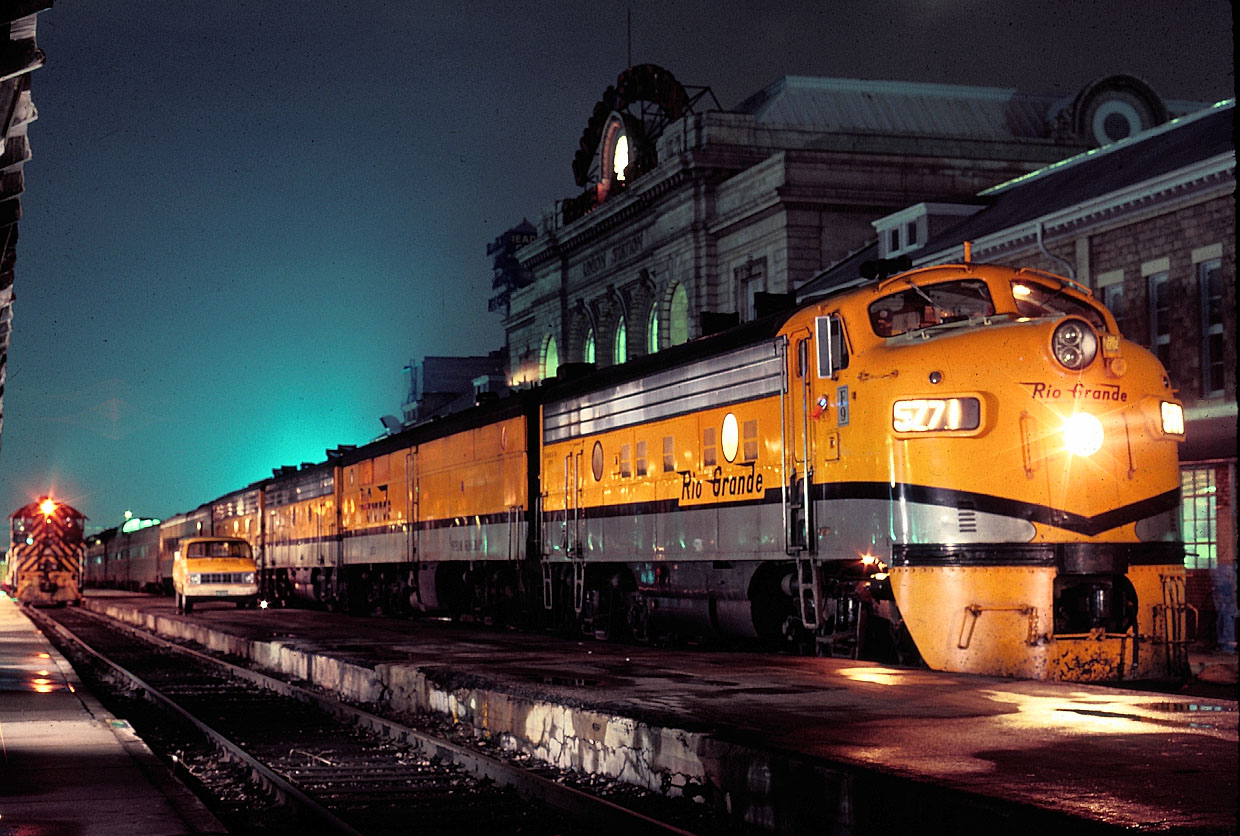
The Rio Grande Zephyr arriving at Union Station in Denver, Colorado in 1983. In April of that same year, and after 12 years, the service ceased operations, being replaced by Amtrak's new California Zephyr.

In 1983, Rio Grande elected to join Amtrak, citing increasing losses in passenger operations. The company made the last run of its Rio Grande Zephyr on April 24 and delivered most of the rolling stock with which that service was provided, although Amtrak was already replacing with new Superliners to its Heritage Fleet and thus the ex-D&RGW cars did not make it to service on the new California Zephyr. Amtrak re-routed the San Francisco Zephyr over the D&RGW's Moffat Subdivision between Denver and Salt Lake City, its original preference from 1971. The change was scheduled for April 25, but a mudslide at Thistle, Utah, closed the line and delayed the change until July 16. With the change of route, Amtrak renamed the train as the California Zephyr. The modern California Zephyr uses mostly the same route as the original east of Winnemucca, Nevada. The train uses the route of the former City of San Francisco, along the Overland Route (First transcontinental railroad), west of Wells, Nevada. Across central Nevada, the two rail lines have been combined to use directional running. As such, the exact spot the train switches lines depends on the direction of travel.

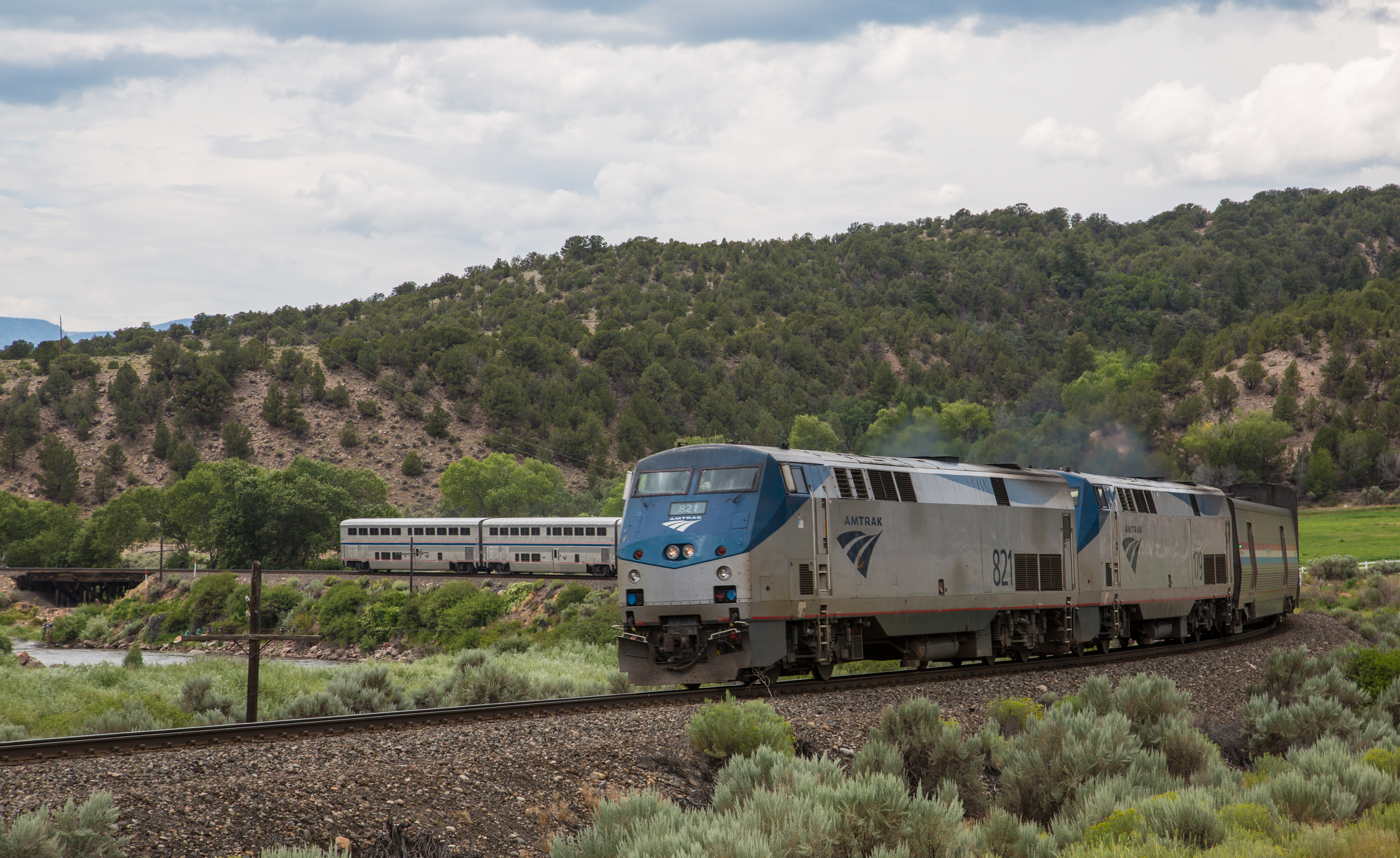
The California Zephyr rounds a curve along the Colorado River near McCoy, Colorado in 2016.

For most of the 1980s and 1990s, the California Zephyr operated in tandem with the Seattle-bound Pioneer and Los Angeles-bound Desert Wind. Since 1980, the Pioneer and Desert Wind had exchanged through coaches with the San Francisco Zephyr at Ogden. The exchange point was moved to Salt Lake City when the latter train became the California Zephyr. This created a massive train of 16 Superliner cars running from Chicago to Utah, easily the longest train Amtrak had operated outside of the Auto Train. Amtrak required at least four EMD F40PH locomotives to pull this behemoth over the steep grades of the Moffat subdivision. To ease the load, Amtrak began splitting the Pioneer from the Zephyr and Desert Wind at Denver in 1991, while the Desert Wind continued splitting from the Zephyr at Salt Lake City. The Pioneer and Desert Wind were both discontinued in 1997.

The western terminus of the train was cut back to Emeryville station when Oakland Central station closed on August 5, 1994. The California Zephyr was re-extended to Oakland with the opening of the Jack London Square station on May 12, 1995. However, this required a complicated reverse move along street running tracks to reach the wye at West Oakland. The train was cut back again to Emeryville on October 26, 1997.

Service between Reno and Denver was suspended for about a month in April 2020, as part of a round of service reduction in response to the coronavirus pandemic. Frequency was reduced to tri-weekly in October 2020, but was restored to daily service on May 24, 2021, after additional Amtrak funding was included in the American Rescue Plan Act of 2021. A resurgence of the virus caused by the Omicron variant and associated staffing and equipment shortages caused Amtrak to reduce the train's service to a five days a week Tuesday through Saturday schedule from January 19 to May 23, 2022. Daily service resumed in June 2022.

== Rolling stock ==
The California Zephyr uses Superliner equipment like Amtrak's other long-distance trains in the Western United States. As of 2024, a typical California Zephyr has:

- 2 GE Genesis/Siemens ALC-42 locomotives
- Viewliner II baggage car
- Superliner transition sleeper
- 2 Superliner sleepers
- Superliner diner
- Superliner Sightseer Lounge
- 1 Superliner coach
- 1 Superliner coach/baggage car
- 1 Superliner coach/cafe car

As of March 2025, Amtrak plans to add a third coach in May and a third sleeper in June to meet demand. As with the other long-distance routes, Amtrak plans to fully replace the P42DCs with ALC-42 locomotives by 2027, and the Superliner cars with new long-distance cars by 2032.

== Route description ==
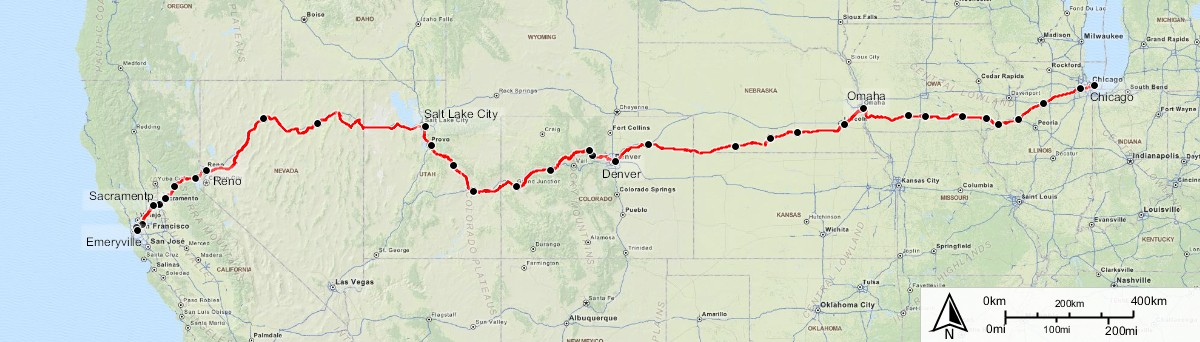
California Zephyr route map

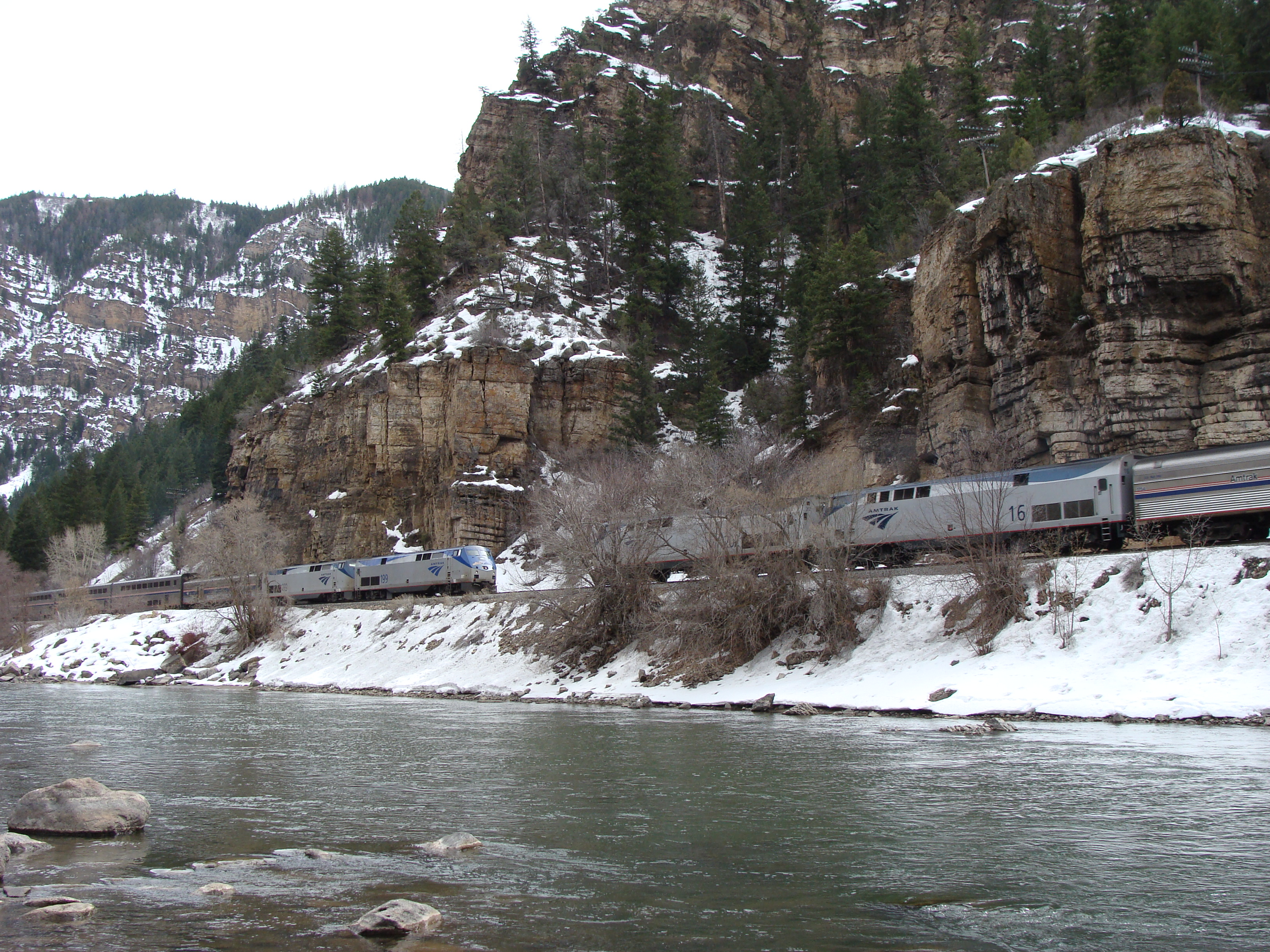
California Zephyrs eastbound and westbound meeting in the Glenwood Canyon Siding

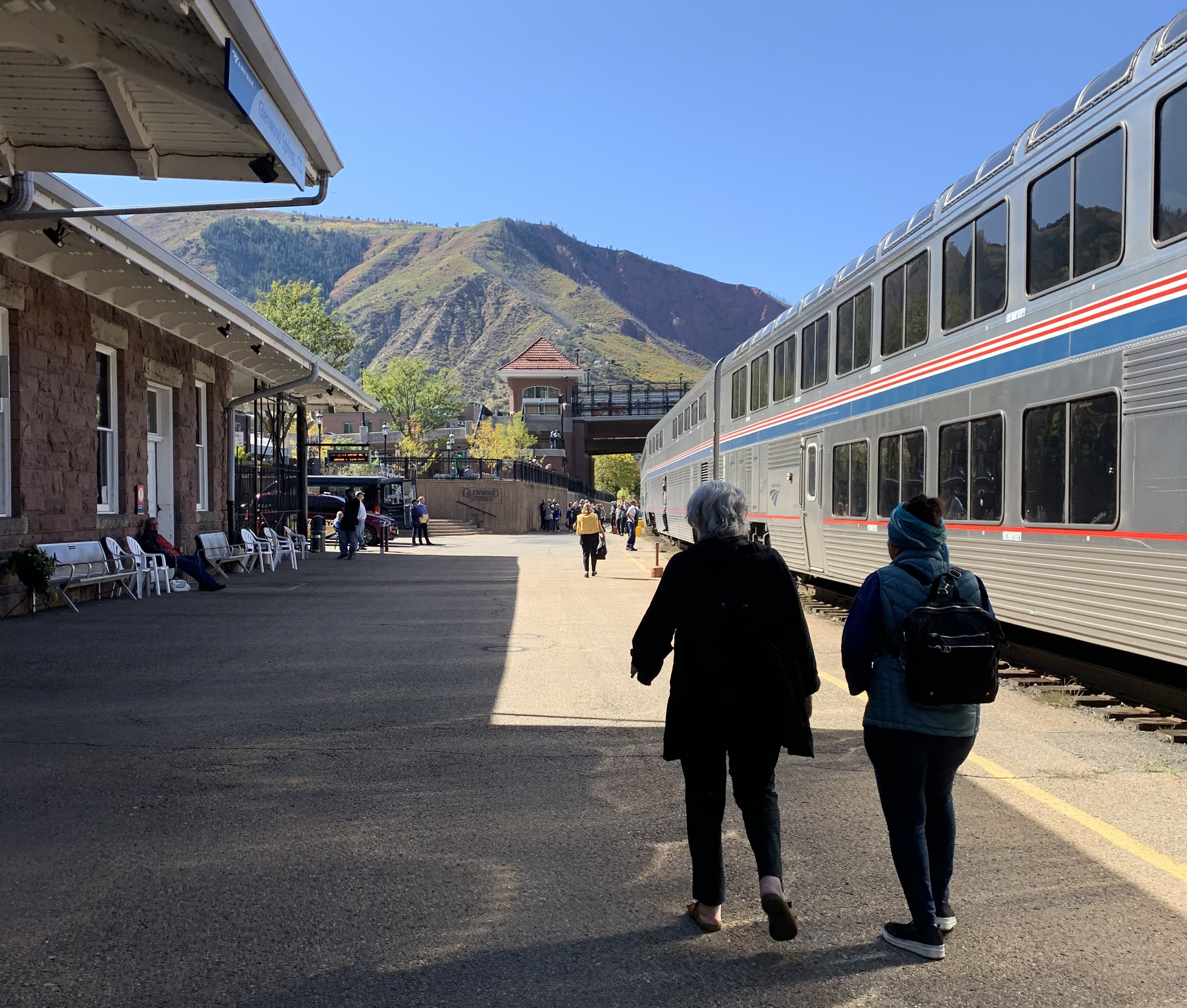
The westbound Zephyr stops at the station at Glenwood Springs, Colorado.

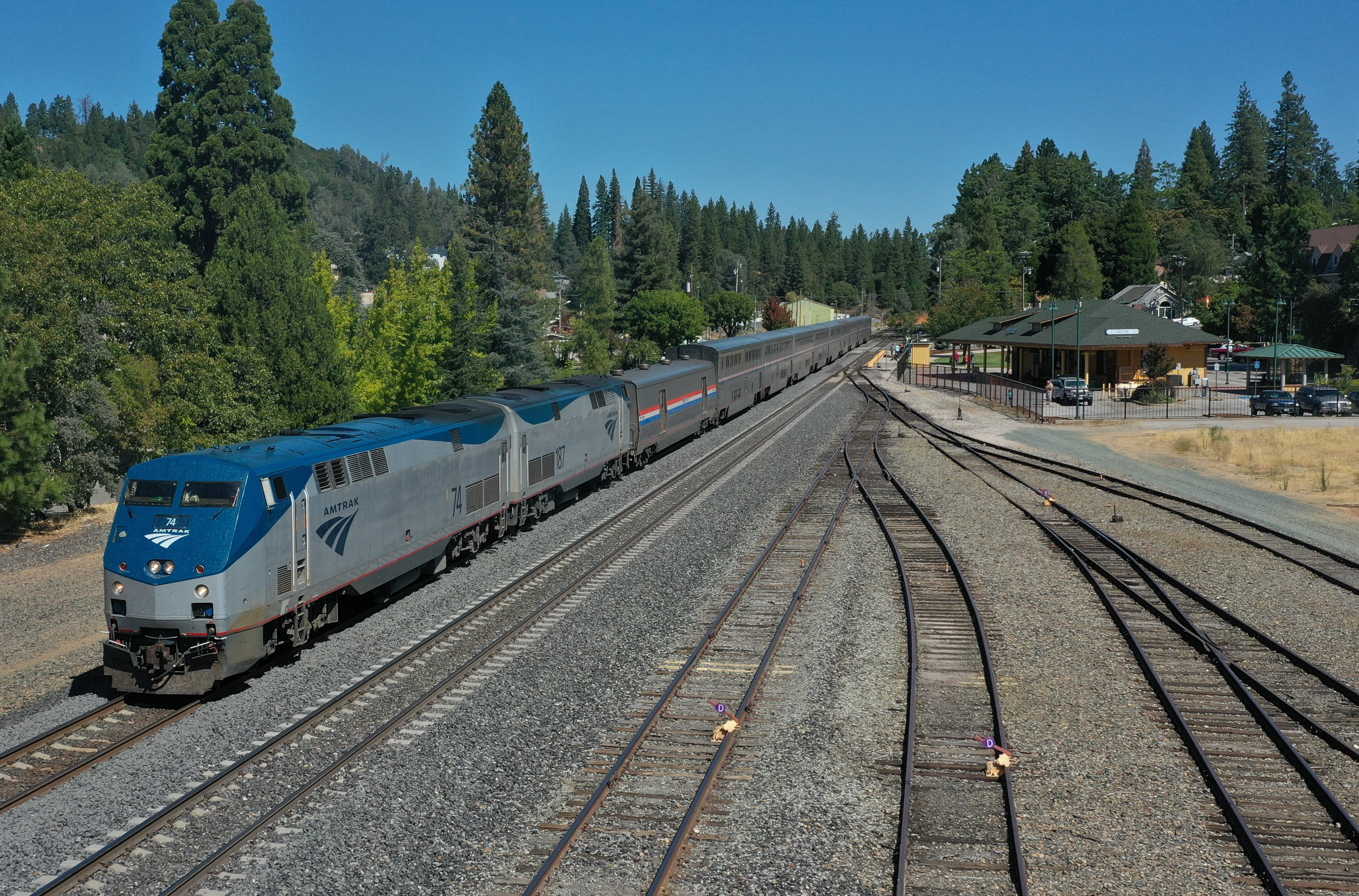
The westbound California Zephyr at Colfax in 2019

The westbound train is Amtrak number 5 (number 6 eastbound). Upon leaving Chicago Union Station, the train travels along the Metra BNSF Line, with an intermediate stop in Naperville, Illinois.

After passing through Aurora, Illinois, the train travels across the Illinois prairies, using the Burlington Rail Bridge to cross the Mississippi River in Burlington, Iowa. After running through southern Iowa, the Zephyr reaches the Missouri River between Council Bluffs, Iowa, and Omaha, Nebraska. From Omaha, the train travels overnight through southern Nebraska and northeastern Colorado, making a morning arrival in Denver.

At Denver, the Zephyr switches over from BNSF to Union Pacific tracks. Westbound, the train is routed over the Central Corridor for the trip through the Tunnel District. The line crosses the Continental Divide via the 6.2 mile-long Moffat Tunnel under James Peak. Leaving the Moffat Tunnel, the tracks then follow the Colorado River from Winter Park Resort to Ruby Canyon, west of Grand Junction, which is also where the train enters Utah. The Colorado River portion of the trip is informally called "moon river", as whitewater rafters pull down their pants and moon the passengers.

Between Denver and Fraser–Winter Park station, the Zephyr shares a route with the Winter Park Express, a service that runs only during the peak Winter season (mid-December through March) and is used primarily by tourists heading to the ski resorts located in Winter Park.

Also between Denver and Salt Lake City, the Zephyr shares the route with Rocky Mountaineer's Canyon Spirit passenger service.

In Utah, the train follows the southern rim of the Book Cliffs to their end near Helper. The Zephyr crosses the Wasatch Mountains, cresting at Soldier Summit before descending into the Wasatch Front to arrive at Salt Lake City.

From Salt Lake City to Emeryville, the Zephyr route loosely follows Interstate 80, traveling along the south shore of the Great Salt Lake and across the Bonneville Salt Flats towards Nevada. After crossing into Nevada at Wendover, Utah/West Wendover, Nevada, the route passes the Toano Range, via Silver Zone Pass, across the Goshute Valley, tunnels under the Pequop Mountains and then skirts the northern edge of the Ruby Mountains.

The line first reaches the Humboldt River near Wells, which it loosely follows until the river's end in the Humboldt Sink near Lovelock. Here, the tracks cross the center of the Forty Mile Desert; on the other side of this desert valley is the Truckee River, which provides the line's path to Reno and up the Sierra Nevada in California.

Amtrak's eastbound "California Zephyr" going through Verdi after passing California-Nevada border

In California, the tracks round Donner Lake, crest the Sierra Nevada at Donner Pass, and descend a high ridge between the American and Yuba Rivers, through Emigrant Gap. The line empties out into the California Central Valley, and then runs along the San Pablo Bay, with stops in Sacramento and Davis. It crosses the Benicia Bridge and has stops in Martinez and Richmond, where BART provides connections to Berkeley and Oakland. The trip ends in Emeryville, where Amtrak Thruway service provides connecting service to San Francisco.

=== Stations ===
State	Municipality	Station	Connections
Illinois	Chicago	Chicago Union Station	Amtrak (long-distance): Cardinal, City of New Orleans, Empire Builder, Floridian, Lake Shore Limited, Southwest Chief, Texas Eagle; Amtrak (intercity): Blue Water, Borealis, Hiawatha, Illini and Saluki, Illinois Zephyr and Carl Sandburg, Lincoln Service, Pere Marquette, Wolverine; Metra: BNSF, Heritage Corridor, Milwaukee District North, Milwaukee District West, North Central Service, SouthWest Service; Chicago "L": Blue (at Clinton) Brown Orange Pink Purple (at Quincy); Local buses: CTA, Pace; Intercity buses: Amtrak Thruway, Greyhound, Megabus
Illinois	Naperville	Naperville	Amtrak: Illinois Zephyr and Carl Sandburg, Southwest Chief; Metra: BNSF; Pace
Illinois	Princeton	Princeton	Amtrak: Illinois Zephyr and Carl Sandburg, Southwest Chief
Illinois	Galesburg	Galesburg	Amtrak: Illinois Zephyr and Carl Sandburg, Southwest Chief; Galesburg Transit
Iowa	Burlington	Burlington	Burlington Urban Service
Iowa	Mount Pleasant	Mount Pleasant	
Iowa	Ottumwa	Ottumwa	
Iowa	Osceola	Osceola	
Iowa	Creston	Creston	
Nebraska	Omaha	Omaha	Metro (Omaha)
Nebraska	Lincoln	Lincoln	StarTran
Nebraska	Hastings	Hastings	
Nebraska	Holdrege	Holdrege	
Nebraska	McCook	McCook	
Colorado	Fort Morgan	Fort Morgan	
Colorado	Denver	Denver Union Station	Amtrak: Winter Park Express (winter only); Amtrak Thruway; Rocky Mountaineer: Rockies to Red Rocks; Denver RTD: A Line, B Line, G Line, N Line, E Line, W Line; Greyhound Lines; Burlington Trailways, Bustang, Express Arrow, RTD Flatiron Flyer; RTD Bus
Colorado	Fraser	Fraser–Winter Park	Amtrak: Winter Park Express
Colorado	Granby	Granby	
Colorado	Glenwood Springs	Glenwood Springs	Rocky Mountaineer: Rockies to Red Rocks; Greyhound Lines
Colorado	Grand Junction	Grand Junction	Grand Valley Transit
Utah	Green River	Green River	
Utah	Helper	Helper	
Utah	Provo	Provo	FrontRunner; Salt Lake Express; UTA Bus
Utah	Salt Lake City	Salt Lake City	Amtrak Thruway; FrontRunner; TRAX: Blue Line; Greyhound Lines; High Valley Transit, UTA Bus
Nevada	Elko	Elko	
Nevada	Winnemucca	Winnemucca	
Nevada	Reno	Reno	Amtrak Thruway: 20
California	Truckee	Truckee	Amtrak Thruway: 20; Greyhound Lines; Tahoe Truckee Regional Transit
California	Colfax	Colfax	Amtrak Thruway: 20; Placer County Transit
California	Roseville	Roseville	Amtrak: Capitol Corridor; Amtrak Thruway: 20
California	Sacramento	Sacramento	Amtrak: Coast Starlight, Capitol Corridor, Gold Runner; Amtrak Thruway: 3, 20, 20C; SacRT: Gold; El Dorado Transit, SacRT
California	Davis	Davis	Amtrak: Coast Starlight, Capitol Corridor; Amtrak Thruway: 3; Unitrans
California	Martinez	Martinez	Amtrak: Coast Starlight, Capitol Corridor, Gold Runner; Amtrak Thruway: 7; County Connection, Tri Delta Transit, WestCAT
California	Richmond	Richmond	Amtrak: Capitol Corridor, Gold Runner; BART: Orange Line, Red Line
California	Emeryville	Emeryville	Amtrak: Coast Starlight, Capitol Corridor, Gold Runner; Amtrak Thruway: 99; AC Transit, Emery Go-Round

=== Rail line subdivisions ===
From east to west the current route of the Zephyr uses the following rail subdivisions:

BNSF Railway

- Chicago Subdivision Chicago Union Station to Aurora, Illinois
- Mendota Subdivision Aurora to Galesburg, Illinois
- Ottumwa Subdivision Galesburg to Creston, Iowa
- Creston Subdivision Creston to north-northwest of Plattsmouth, Nebraska
- Omaha Subdivision north-northwest of Plattsmouth to north-northeast of Ashland, Nebraska
- Creston Subdivision north-northeast of Ashland to Lincoln, Nebraska
- Hastings Subdivision Lincoln to McCook, Nebraska
- Akron Subdivision McCook to Brush, Colorado
- Brush Subdivision Brush to Denver

Union Pacific Central Corridor

- Greeley Subdivision to East Denver Belt Line in Denver just west of Broadway
- Moffat Tunnel Subdivision Denver (just west of Broadway) to south-southeast of Bond, Colorado between [MP-128] and [MP-129]
- Glenwood Springs Subdivision Bond to Grand Junction, Colorado
- Green River Subdivision Grand Junction to Helper, Utah
- Provo Subdivision Helper to Salt Lake City
- Lynndyl Subdivision Salt Lake City to Kennecott Smokestack [MP-767] west of Salt Lake City
- Shafter Subdivision [MP-911] Kennecott Smokestack to Elko, Nevada
- Elko Subdivision Elko to Weso (switching point east of Winnemucca, Nevada)
- Nevada Subdivision Weso to Sparks, Nevada
- Roseville Subdivision Sparks to Roseville, California
- Martinez Subdivision Roseville to Emeryville

== See also ==
- CB&Q Denver Zephyr—related train service
- Longest train journeys
- Train Jam—annual event involving the California Zephyr
