= Roseville Subdivision =

Railway line over the Sierra Nevada Mountains in California and Nevada

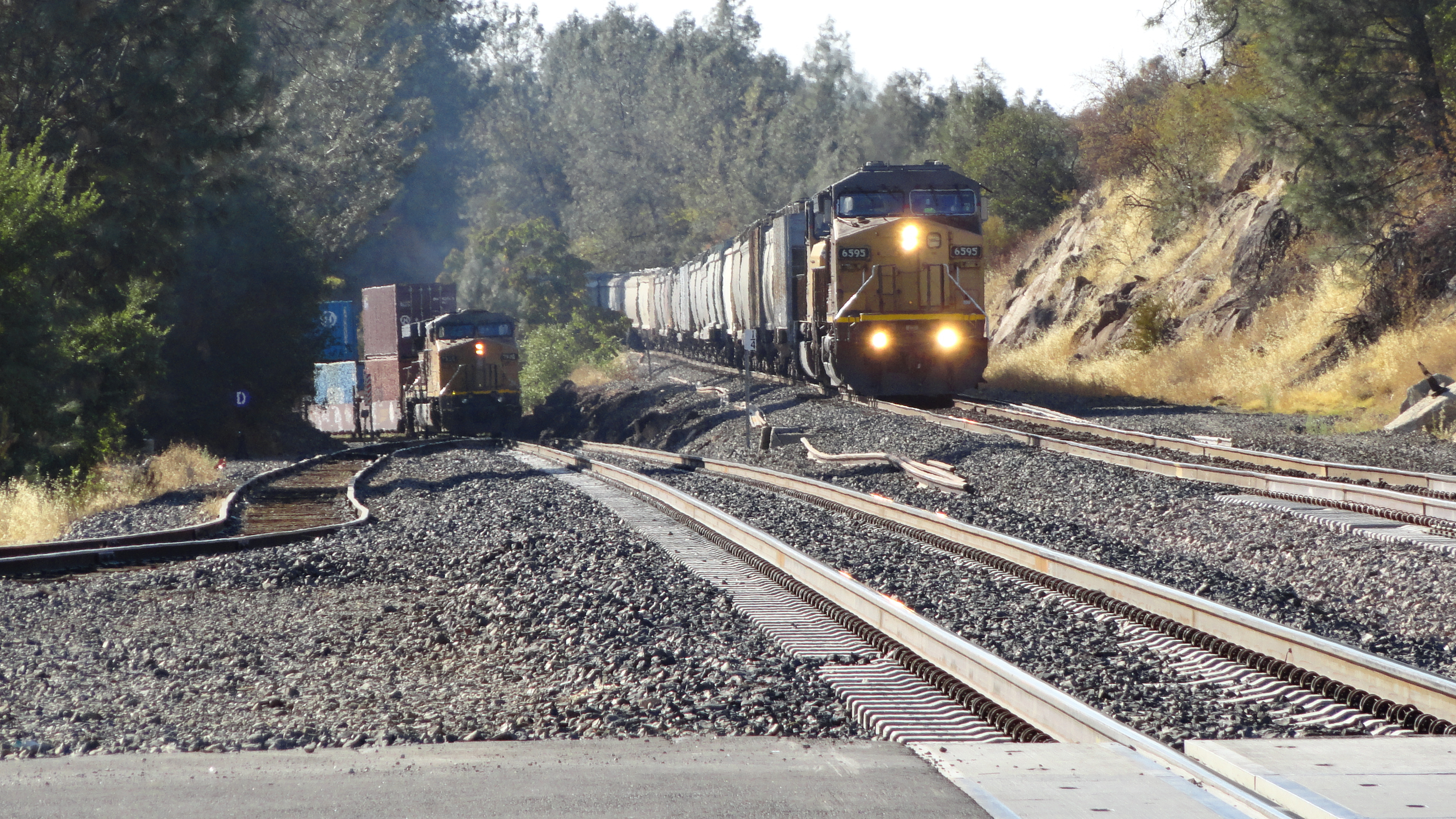
Newcastle, freight trains at Main Street crossing

The Roseville Subdivision is a railway line in California and Nevada owned by the Union Pacific Railroad, as part of the Overland Route. It runs from Roseville, California over the Sierra Nevada to Reno, Nevada. The route originated as the initial Central Pacific Railroad segment of the first transcontinental railroad, but has since been upgraded, double tracked, or realigned in some locations. The line reaches an elevation of 6,887 feet (2,099 m) above sea level at Norden, California.

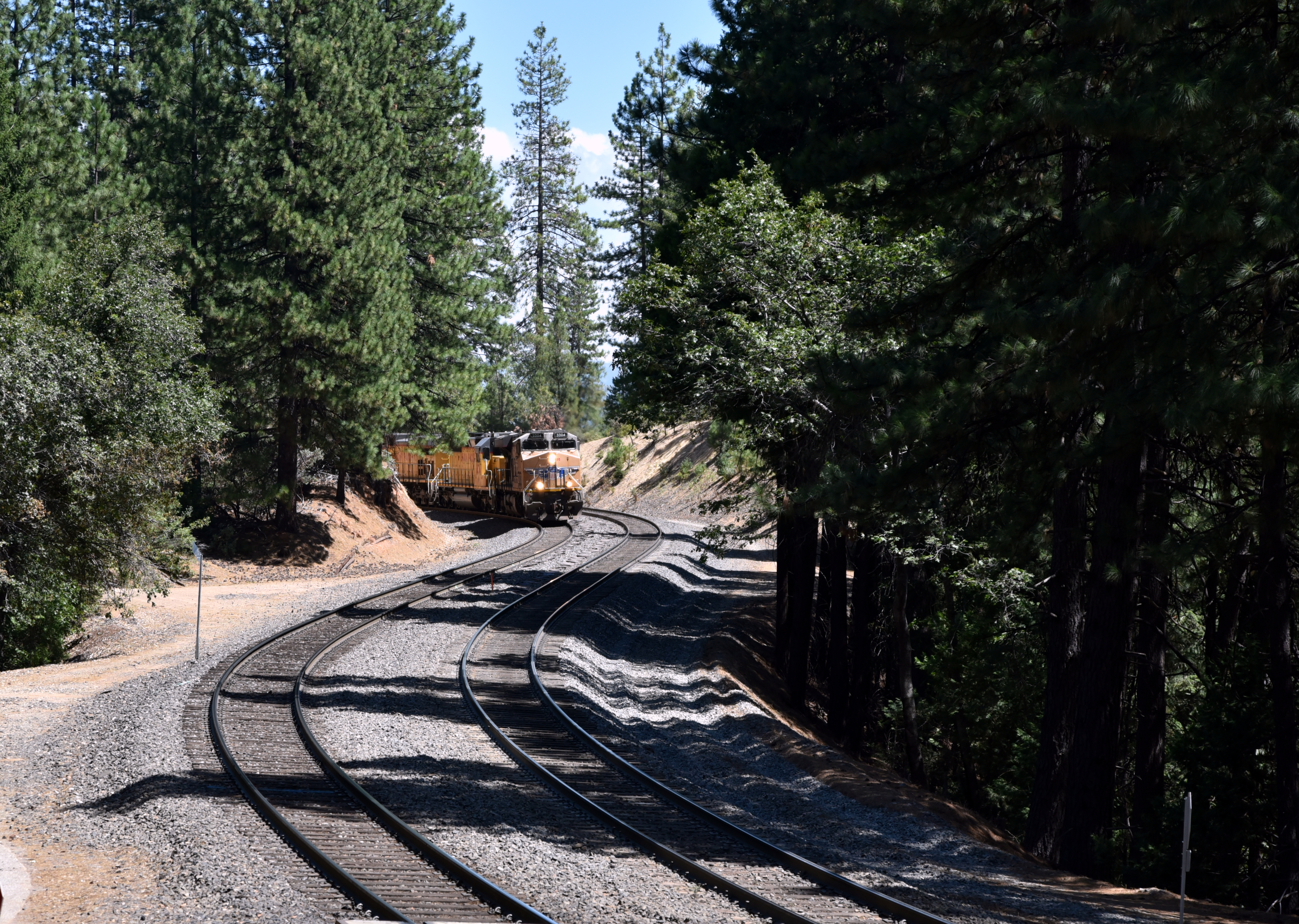
Union Pacific freight train navigating curves through Sierra Nevada mountains

The route is primarily used for freight, but Amtrak operates passenger trains over the line. The California Zephyr runs the entire route while the Capitol Corridor terminates in Auburn, California with service to the south and west. As of 2003 the line sees 15 freight trains daily.

Southern Pacific undertook double-tracking large portions of the route starting in 1909. The track through Tunnel Number 6 at the summit was mothballed (though not formally abandoned) in 1993.

Between 2002 and 2005, the right of way was depressed into a trench through Reno to eliminate the 11 level crossings in the downtown area. By 2009 the line had been upgraded to allow the shipping of double-stacked containers in trains 9,000 feet (1.7 mi; 2.7 km) long.

== See also ==
- Feather River Route — Union Pacific's other route over the Sierra Nevada
