= St Ita's =

St Ita's may refer to:

- St. Ita's Hospital, a large mental hospital near Dublin
- St. Ita's GAA, a Gaelic games club in County Cork, Ireland
- St. Ita's Church, a Catholic church in Chicago

== See also ==
- Saint Ita, an Irish saint
