= Green River station (Utah) =

Train station in Green River, Utah, United States

Green River, UT
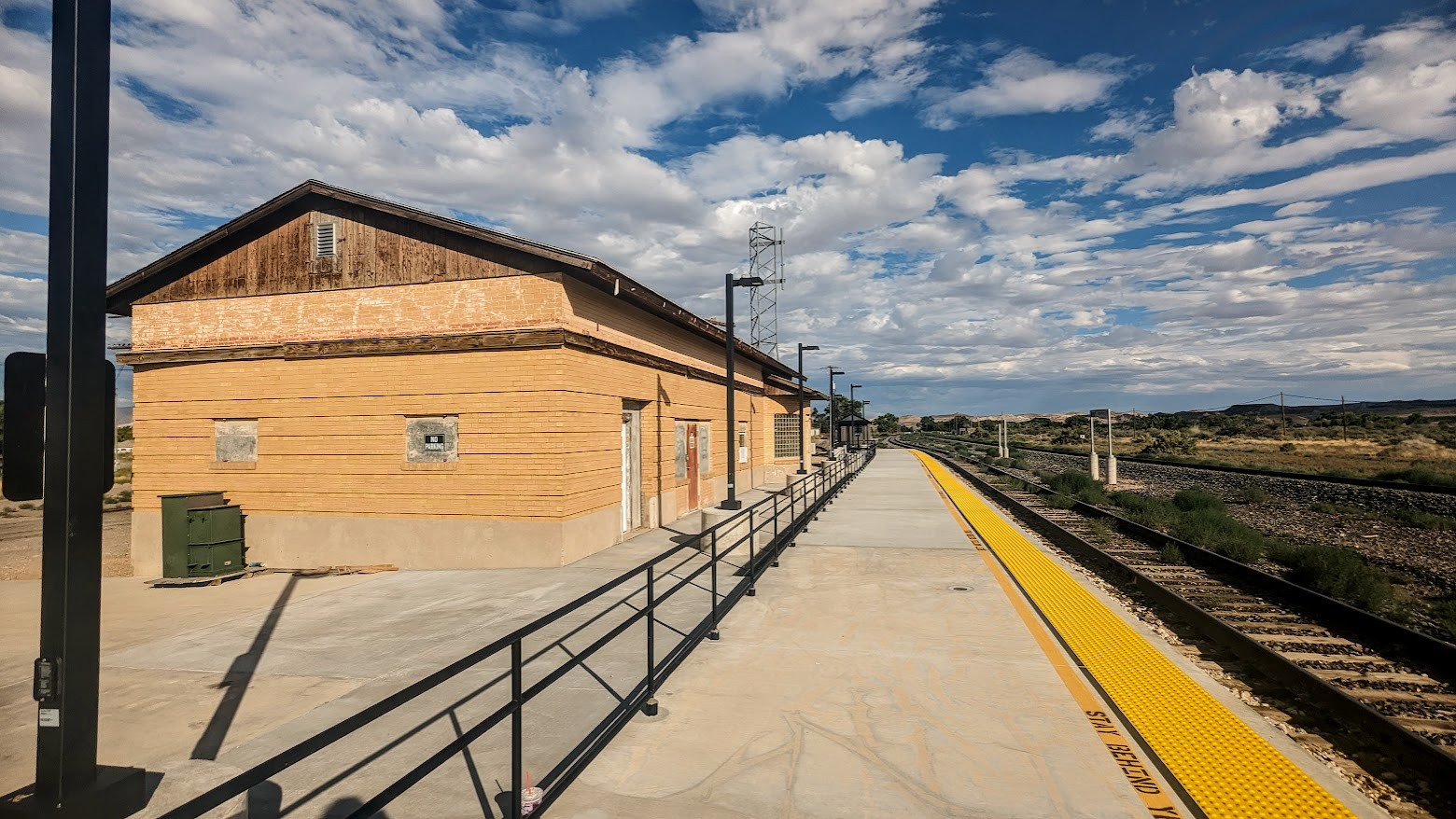
- Green River station in August 2023

General information
- Location: 250 South Broadway; Green River, Utah; United States
- Coordinates: 38°59′32″N 110°09′55″W
- Owner: Union Pacific Railroad
- Line: UP Green River Subdivision
- Platforms: 1 side platform
- Tracks: 2

Construction
- Parking: 20 long term spaces, 5 short term spaces
- Accessible: Yes

Other information
- Station code: Amtrak: GRI

Passengers
- FY 2025: 2,551 (Amtrak)

Services
Preceding station	Amtrak	Following station
Helper toward Emeryville	California Zephyr	Grand Junction toward Chicago
Former services
Preceding station	Amtrak	Following station
Helper toward Los Angeles	Desert Wind	Grand Junction toward Chicago
Helper toward Seattle	Pioneer Before 1991 reroute	Grand Junction toward Chicago
Preceding station	Denver and Rio Grande Western Railroad	Following station
Mounds toward Ogden	Moffat Tunnel Route	Cisco toward Denver
Mounds toward Ogden	Royal Gorge Route	Cisco toward Denver
Helper toward Oakland	California Zephyr	Grand Junction toward Chicago
Location

Green River station is a train station in Green River, Utah, United States. It is served by Amtrak's California Zephyr, which runs once daily between Chicago and Emeryville, California, in the San Francisco Bay Area. The station has a platform and bus-stop style shelter and no services.

== History ==
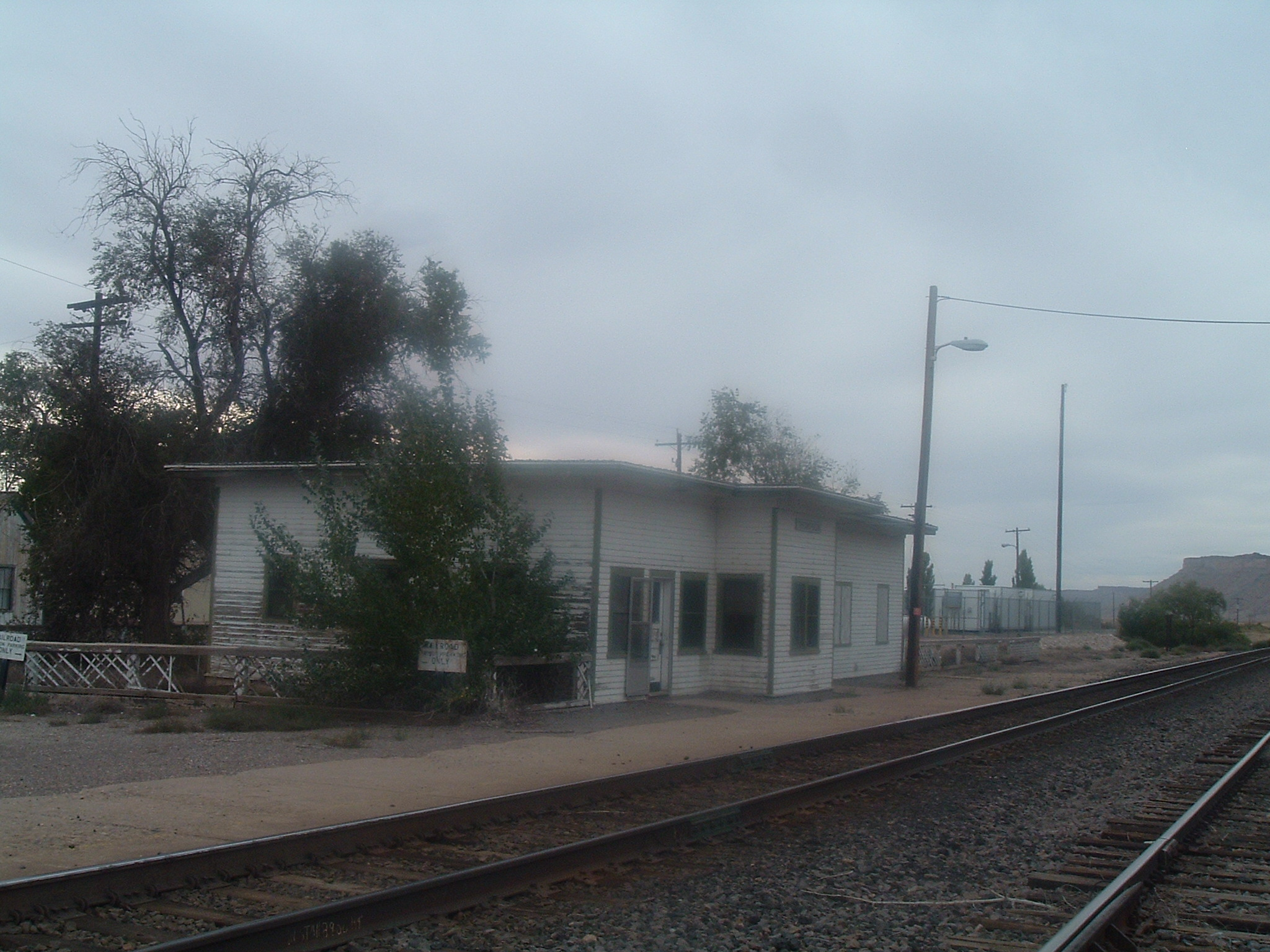
The former train depot in Thompson Springs, last used in 1997

The station was originally built by the Denver and Rio Grande Railroad in the mid-twentieth century and called the "Blake Station". It is now owned by the Union Pacific Railroad.

Amtrak took over most intercity passenger service on May 1, 1971. However, the Denver and Rio Grande Western Railroad (D&RGW) opted to continue to privately operate its Rio Grande Zephyr. In 1983, facing heavy losses, the D&RGW agreed to allow Amtrak to reroute the San Francisco Zephyr over its Moffat Tunnel Route mainline. A mudslide severed the line on April 14, 1983, ending Rio Grande Zephyr service west of Grand Junction, Colorado. After the line was rebuilt, Amtrak's newly renamed California Zephyr began operating over the D&RGW on July 16, 1983, with stops at both Thompson Springs and Green River. The Green River stop was eliminated along with lightly used stops at Bond and Rifle in Colorado on October 30, 1983.

On May 11, 1997, Amtrak closed Thompson station and reopened Green River with a handicapped-accessible platform. The Desert Wind and Pioneer sections of the California Zephyr were eliminated the same day. The Thompson station building was later removed.

== See also ==
- List of Amtrak stations
