= Provo station (Amtrak) =

Train station in Provo, Utah, United States

Provo, UT
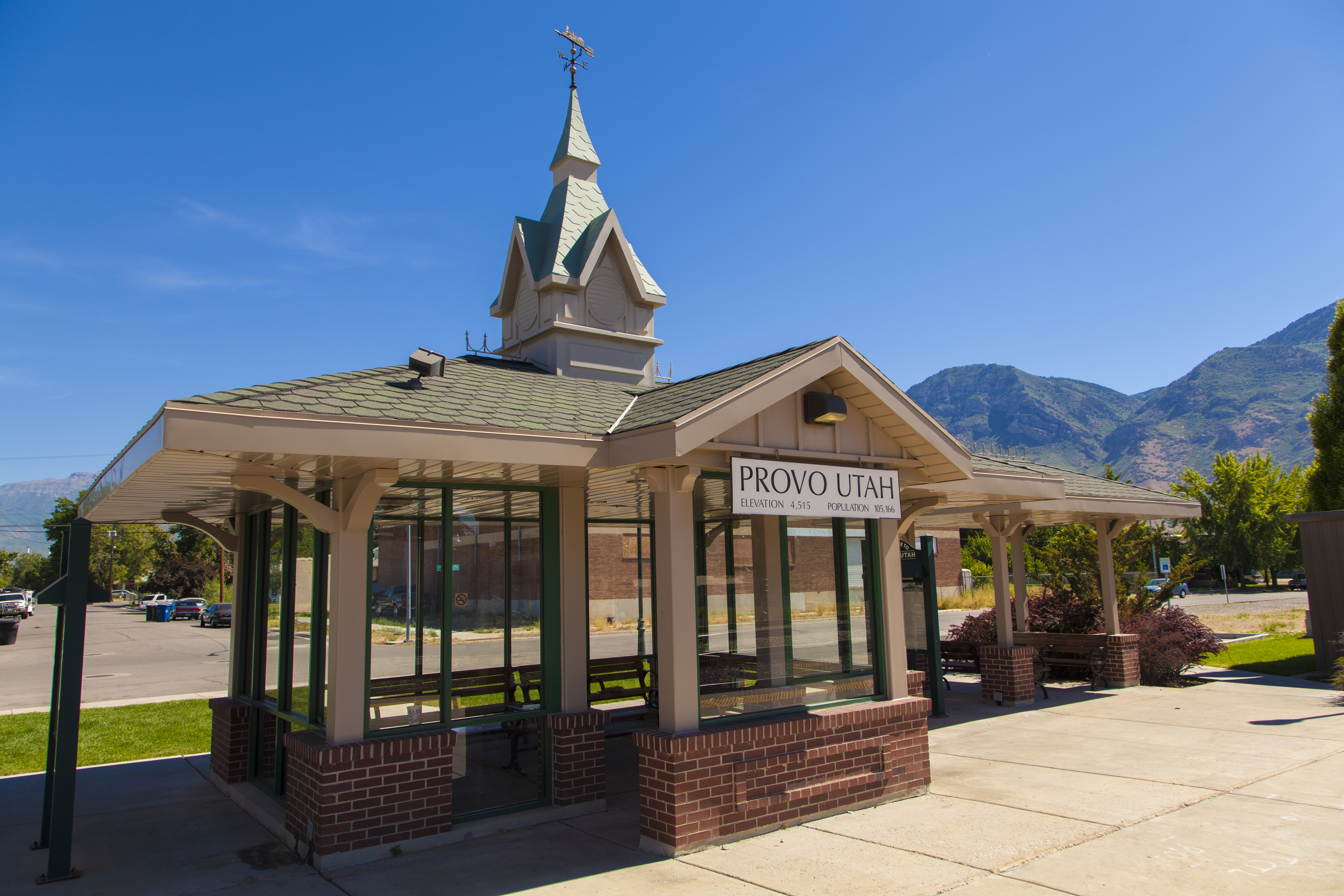
- Provo Amtrak station passenger shelter (view looking north from the track side)

General information
- Location: 300 West 600 South; Provo, Utah; United States
- Coordinates: 40°13′33″N 111°39′50″W
- Owner: Union Pacific Railroad, except parking lot, which is owned by the City of Provo
- Line: Provo Subdivision
- Platforms: 1 side platform
- Tracks: 2
- Connections: UTA FrontRunner Provo Central station very close by, which includes intra-county and local bus service

Construction
- Structure type: At-grade
- Parking: 6 long term parking spaces
- Accessible: Yes

Other information
- Station code: Amtrak: PRO

History
- Opened: 24 May 2002

Passengers
- FY 2025: 8,590 (Amtrak)

Services
Preceding station	Amtrak	Following station
Salt Lake City toward Emeryville	California Zephyr	Helper toward Chicago
Former services
Preceding station	Amtrak	Following station
Salt Lake City (UP Depot) Until 1986 toward Oakland	California Zephyr	Helper toward Chicago
Salt Lake City (D&RGW Depot) 1986-1999 toward Emeryville	California Zephyr	Helper toward Chicago
Salt Lake City (D&RGW Depot) toward Los Angeles	Desert Wind Discontinued in 1997	Helper toward Chicago
Salt Lake City (D&RGW Depot) toward Seattle	Pioneer Before 1991 reroute	Helper toward Chicago
Preceding station	Denver and Rio Grande Western Railroad	Following station
Salt Lake City toward Ogden	Moffat Tunnel Route	Thistle toward Denver
Salt Lake City toward Ogden	Royal Gorge Route	Thistle toward Denver
Salt Lake City toward Oakland	California Zephyr	Helper toward Chicago
Location

Provo station is a train station in Provo, Utah. It is served by Amtrak's California Zephyr, which runs once daily between Chicago and Emeryville, California, in the San Francisco Bay Area. (Note: As of 13 January 2014, the previous schedule continues with the westbound train (Route 5) scheduled to stop at 9:26 pm and the eastbound train (Route 6) scheduled to stop at 4:35 am.)

== Description ==
The station is located on the north side of the tracks and south of 600 South at 300 West. It is easily accessible from 200 West and has six paved parking spaces. There are no services provided at the station (i.e., ticketing, restrooms, lounge, etc.). The station is within walking distance of downtown Provo. The station is located within a Quiet Zone, so all trains (including Utah Transit Authority's FrontRunner and Union Pacific's) do not routinely sound their horns when approaching public crossings within this corridor although they do sound their bells.

Even though UTA's FrontRunner commuter rail line uses the same right-of-way through downtown Provo that is used by the California Zephyr, UTA built a separate station of the same name. That station is located one block east on the south side of the tracks. However, there is easy pedestrian access between the two stations and the UTA connecting intra-county and local bus routes. The FrontRunner provides commuter rail service north to Salt Lake City and Ogden, and stops in between.

== History ==
The station is on the site of a previous station constructed by the Denver and Rio Grande Western Railroad in 1910. This building remained in use until 1986 when, increasingly dilapidated, it was demolished.

The station was little more than a plexiglas bus shelter along the tracks until 2002, when it was replaced by three decorative shelters, one of which is mostly enclosed and heated. The new station opened 14 May 2002 and cost $120,000 with funds coming from Provo City, Amtrak, and a federal grant. In-kind contributions were also provided by Provo City.

Beginning in 1983, both the Desert Wind (with service from Chicago to Los Angeles) and the Pioneer (with service from Chicago to Seattle) previously stopped at the Provo Station. Service by the Pioneer was dropped when that train was rerouted through Wyoming in 1991 (the train was later discontinued altogether in 1997). Service by the Desert Wind ended when Amtrak discontinued that train in 1997 (at the same time as the Pioneer was discontinued). Although the ultimate western end of the line for the Desert Wind was in Los Angeles (southwest of the Provo Station), the train route ran north to Salt Lake City before heading south to its next stop in Milford, Utah (Delta from 1983 to 1988).
