= Helper station =

Train station in Helper, Utah

Helper, UT
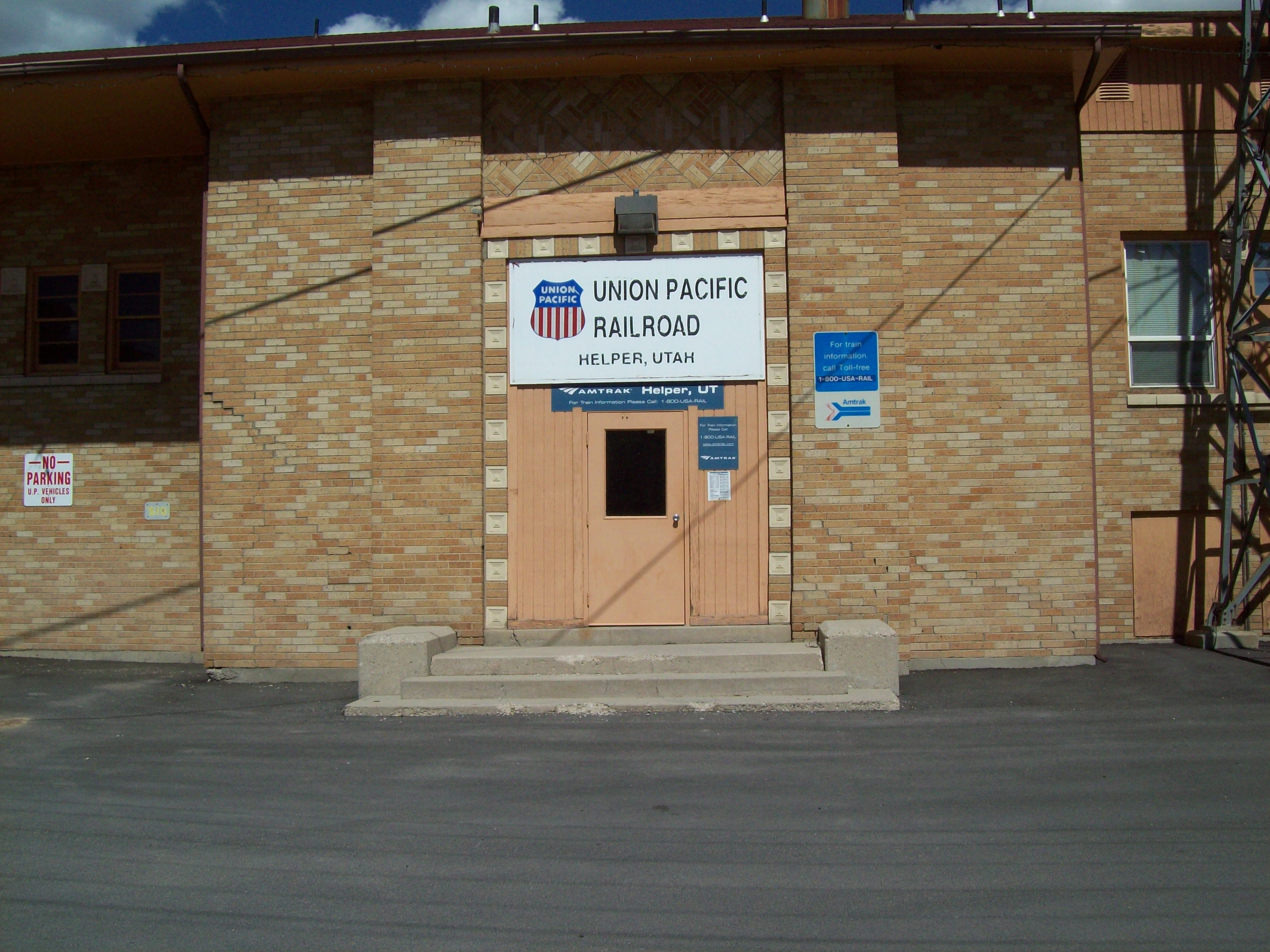
- Entrance to the depot

General information
- Location: 1 Depot Street; Helper, Utah; United States
- Coordinates: 39°41′02″N 110°51′14″W
- Owner: Union Pacific Railroad
- Line: Helper Subdivision
- Platforms: 1 side platform
- Tracks: 2

Construction
- Structure type: At-grade
- Parking: 5 long term spaces, 5 short term spaces
- Accessible: Yes

Other information
- Station code: Amtrak: HER

History
- Opened: 1881
- Rebuilt: 1940

Passengers
- FY 2025: 2,302 (Amtrak)

Services
| Preceding station | Amtrak | Following station |
|---|---|---|
| Provo toward Emeryville | California Zephyr | Green River toward Chicago |
Former services
| Preceding station | Amtrak | Following station |
|---|---|---|
| Provo toward Emeryville | California Zephyr | Thompson Closed in 1997 toward Chicago |
| Provo toward Los Angeles | Desert Wind Discontinued in 1997 | Thompson toward Chicago |
| Provo toward Seattle | Pioneer Before 1991 reroute | Thompson toward Chicago |
| Preceding station | Denver and Rio Grande Western Railroad | Following station |
| Castle Gate toward Ogden | Moffat Tunnel Route | Mounds toward Denver |
| Castle Gate toward Ogden | Royal Gorge Route | Mounds toward Denver |
| Provo toward Oakland | California Zephyr | Thompson Springs toward Chicago |
Location

Helper station is a railroad station in Helper, Utah. It is served by Amtrak's California Zephyr, which runs once daily between Chicago, Illinois, and Emeryville, California, in the San Francisco Bay Area. (Note: As of 13 January 2014, the previous schedule continues with the westbound train (Route 5) scheduled to stop at 7:20 pm and the eastbound train (Route 6) scheduled to stop at 6:37 am.) The station is owned by the Union Pacific Railroad and contains a passenger waiting area; no services are provided (e.g., ticketing, checked baggage, etc.).

== History ==
The station was originally built by the Denver and Rio Grande Western Railroad in 1881, and the current station building was constructed in 1940.

Beginning in 1983, both the Desert Wind (with service from Chicago to Los Angeles) and the Pioneer (with service from Chicago to Seattle) previously stopped at the Helper station. Service by the Pioneer was dropped when that train was rerouted through Wyoming in 1991 (the train was later discontinued altogether in 1997). Service by the Desert Wind ended when Amtrak discontinued that train in 1997 (at the same time as the Pioneer was discontinued). Also in 1997, the Green River station replaced the former station in Thompson Springs as the next station to the east.

== Gallery ==
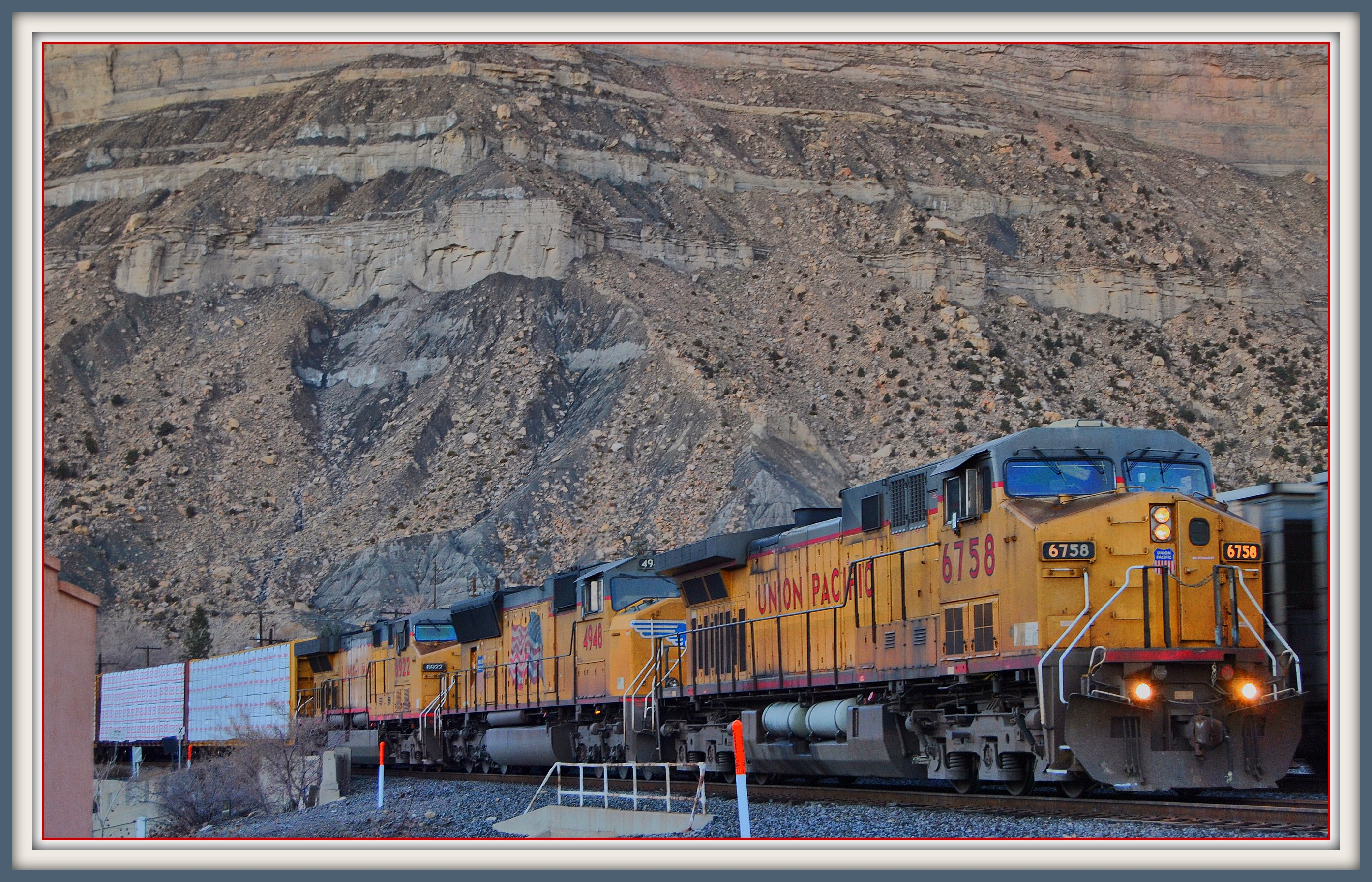
Union Pacific freight train passes Helper station

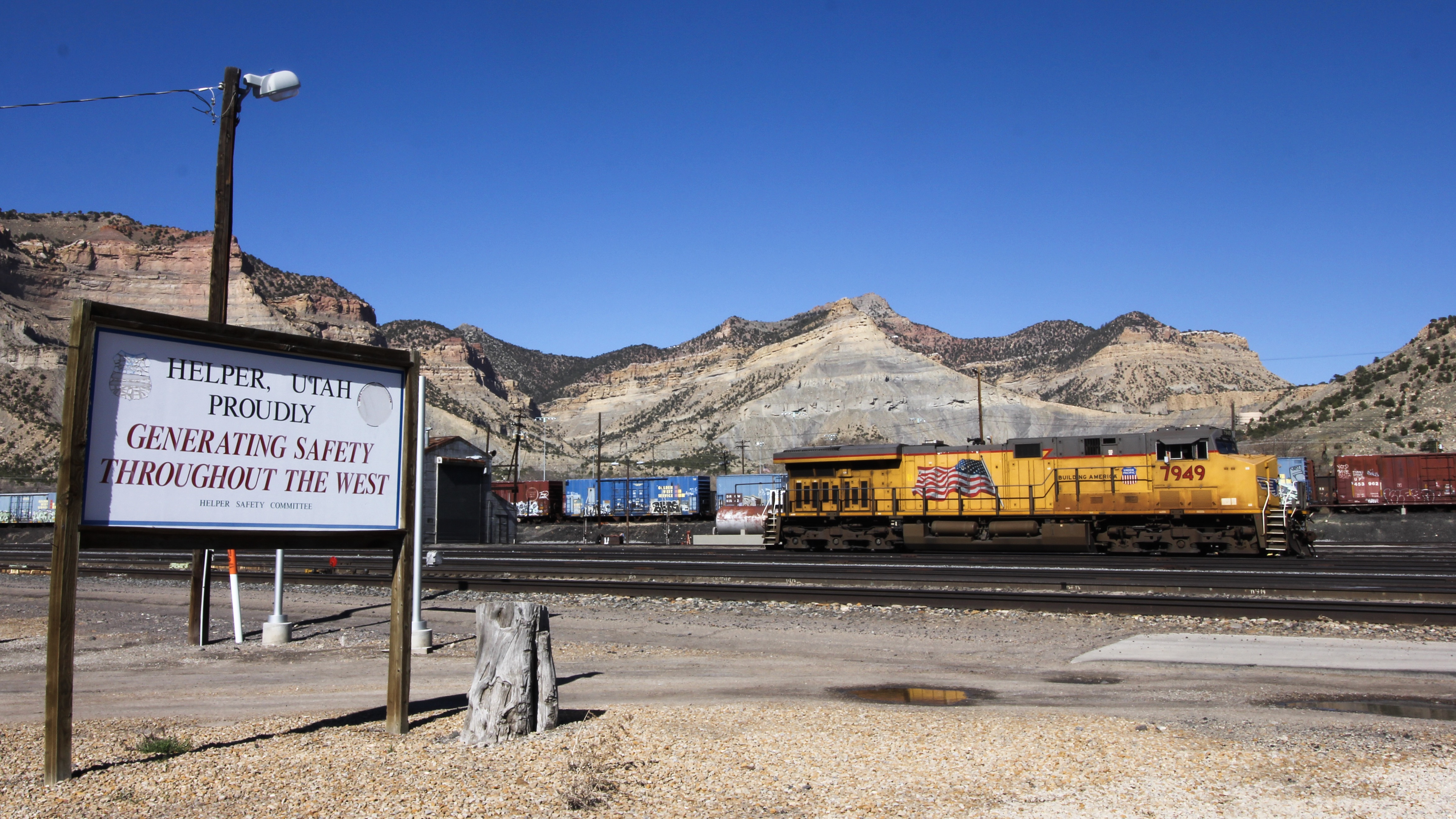
Helper station sign

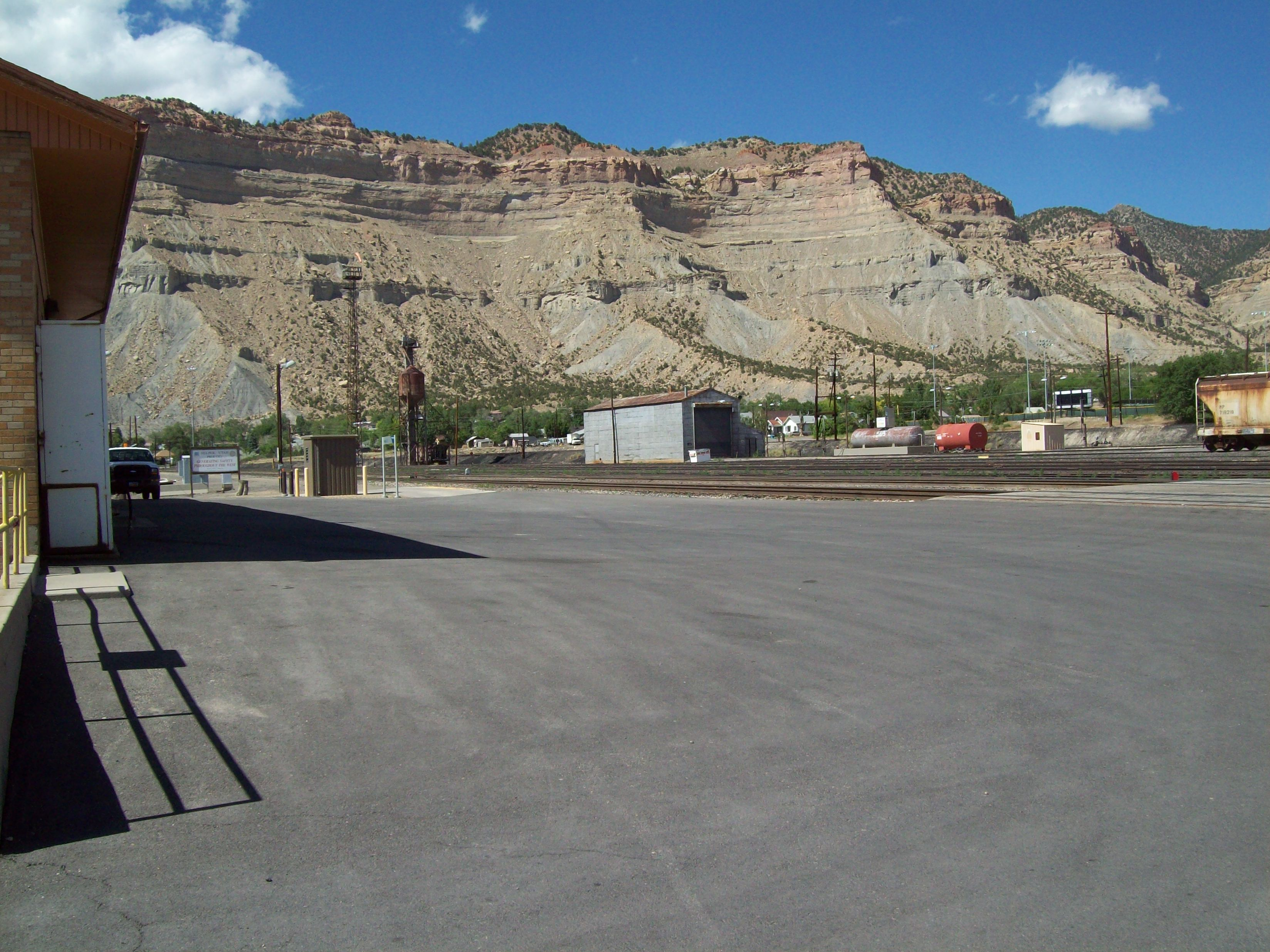
Helper station trackside view
