= Grand Junction station =

Grand Junction, CO
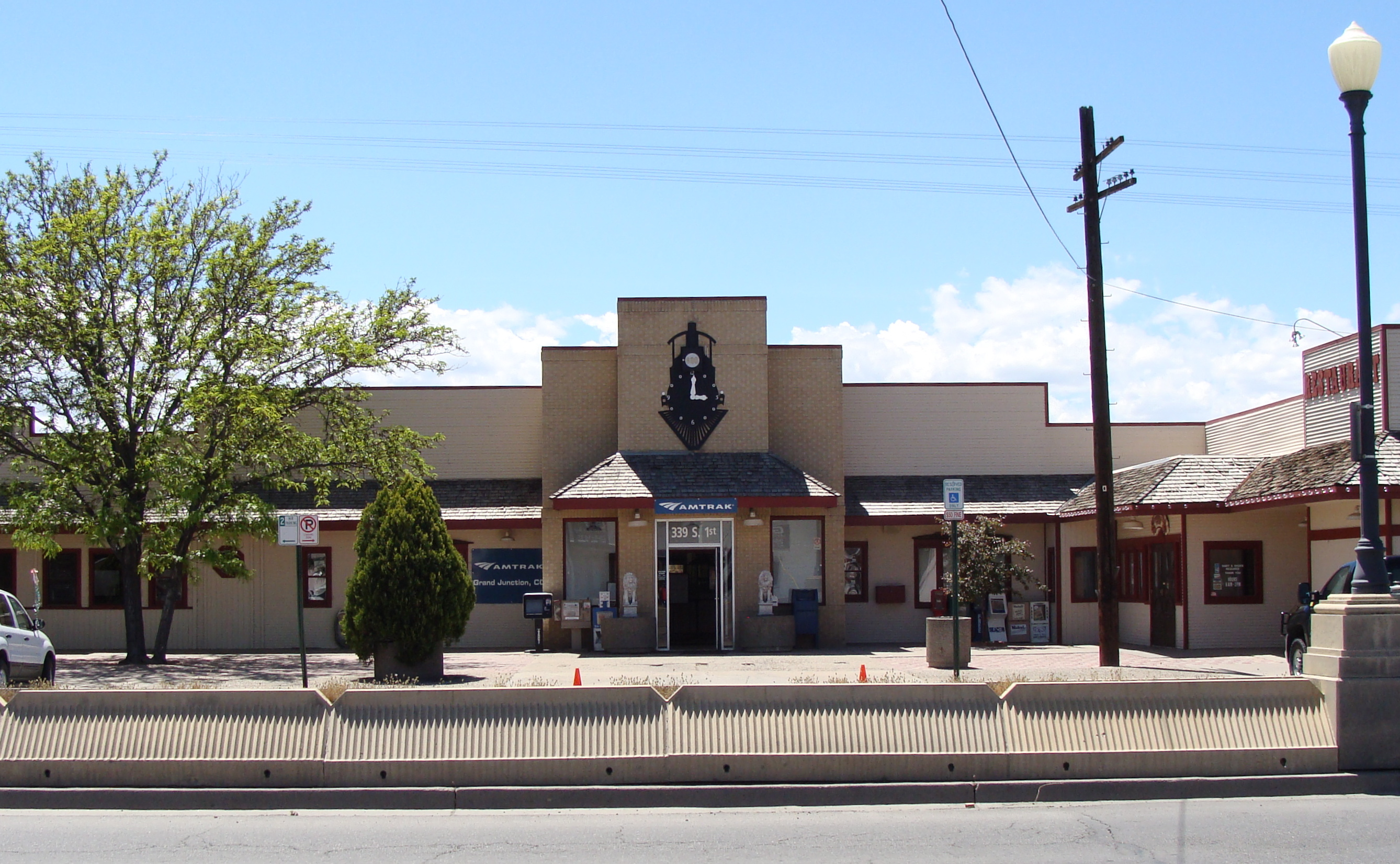
- The current station at Grand Junction

General information
- Location: 339 South 1st Street; Grand Junction, Colorado; United States
- Coordinates: 39.0646°N 108.5705°W
- Owner: Union Pacific Railroad & Pufferbelly, Inc.
- Line: Glenwood Springs Subdivision
- Platforms: 1 side platform 1 island platform
- Tracks: 3
- Connections: Grand Valley Transit: 11

Construction
- Structure type: At-grade
- Parking: 5 short term spaces
- Accessible: Yes

Other information
- Station code: Amtrak: GJT

Passengers
- FY 2025: 27,402 (Amtrak)

Services
Preceding station	Amtrak	Following station
Green River toward Emeryville	California Zephyr	Glenwood Springs toward Chicago
Former services
Preceding station	Amtrak	Following station
Thompson (closed 1997) toward Emeryville	California Zephyr	Glenwood Springs toward Chicago
Thompson toward Los Angeles	Desert Wind	Glenwood Springs toward Chicago
Thompson toward Seattle	Pioneer Before 1991 reroute	Glenwood Springs toward Chicago
Preceding station	Denver and Rio Grande Western Railroad	Following station
Fruita toward Ogden	Moffat Tunnel Route	Palisade toward Denver
Fruita toward Ogden	Royal Gorge Route	Palisade toward Denver
Thompson Springs toward Oakland	California Zephyr	Glenwood Springs toward Chicago
Location

Grand Junction station is a train station in Grand Junction, Colorado, United States, that is served by Amtrak's California Zephyr, which runs once daily between Chicago and Emeryville, California, in the San Francisco Bay Area. (Note: As of 13 January 2014, the previous schedule continues with the westbound train (Route 5) scheduled to stop at 4:10 pm and the eastbound train (Route 6) scheduled to stop at 10:23 am.)

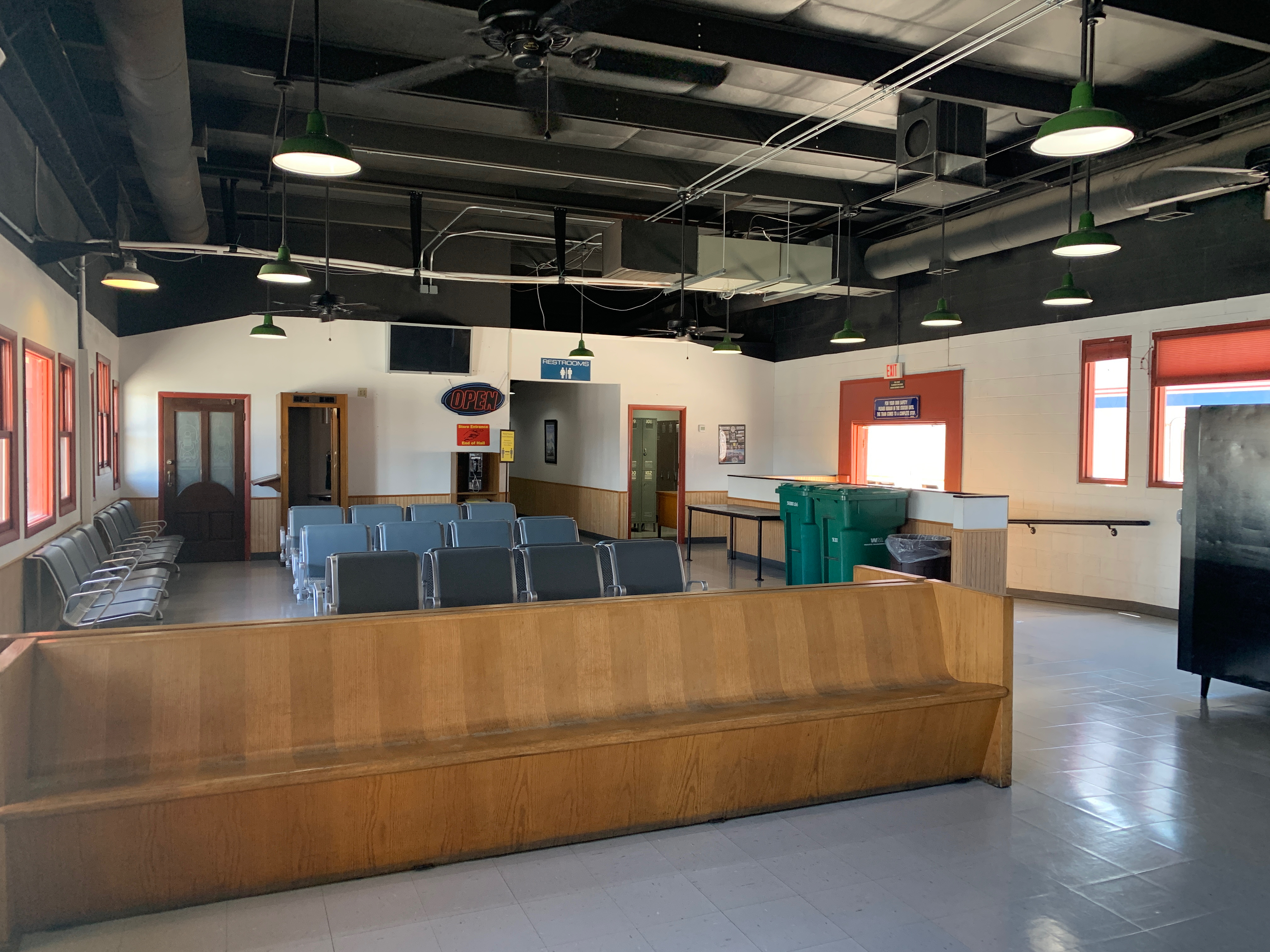
The station interior in June 2021

The station is adjacent to the original Denver and Rio Grande Depot. The original depot was built in 1906 and replaced by the current adjacent structure in 1992. The current station building was built in the late 1970s and originally used as a restaurant.

Beginning in 1983, both the Desert Wind (with service from Chicago to Los Angeles) and the Pioneer (with service from Chicago to Seattle) stopped at the Grand Junction Station. Service by the Pioneer was dropped when that train was rerouted through Wyoming in 1991 (the train was later discontinued altogether in 1997). Service by the Desert Wind ended when Amtrak discontinued that train in 1997 (at the same time as the Pioneer was discontinued). Also in 1997, the Green River Station (in Utah) station replaced the former station in Thompson Springs, Utah, as the next station to the west.
