= Grand Valley Transit =

Public transportation agency in Colorado

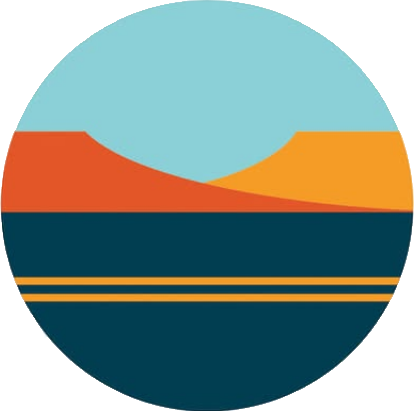

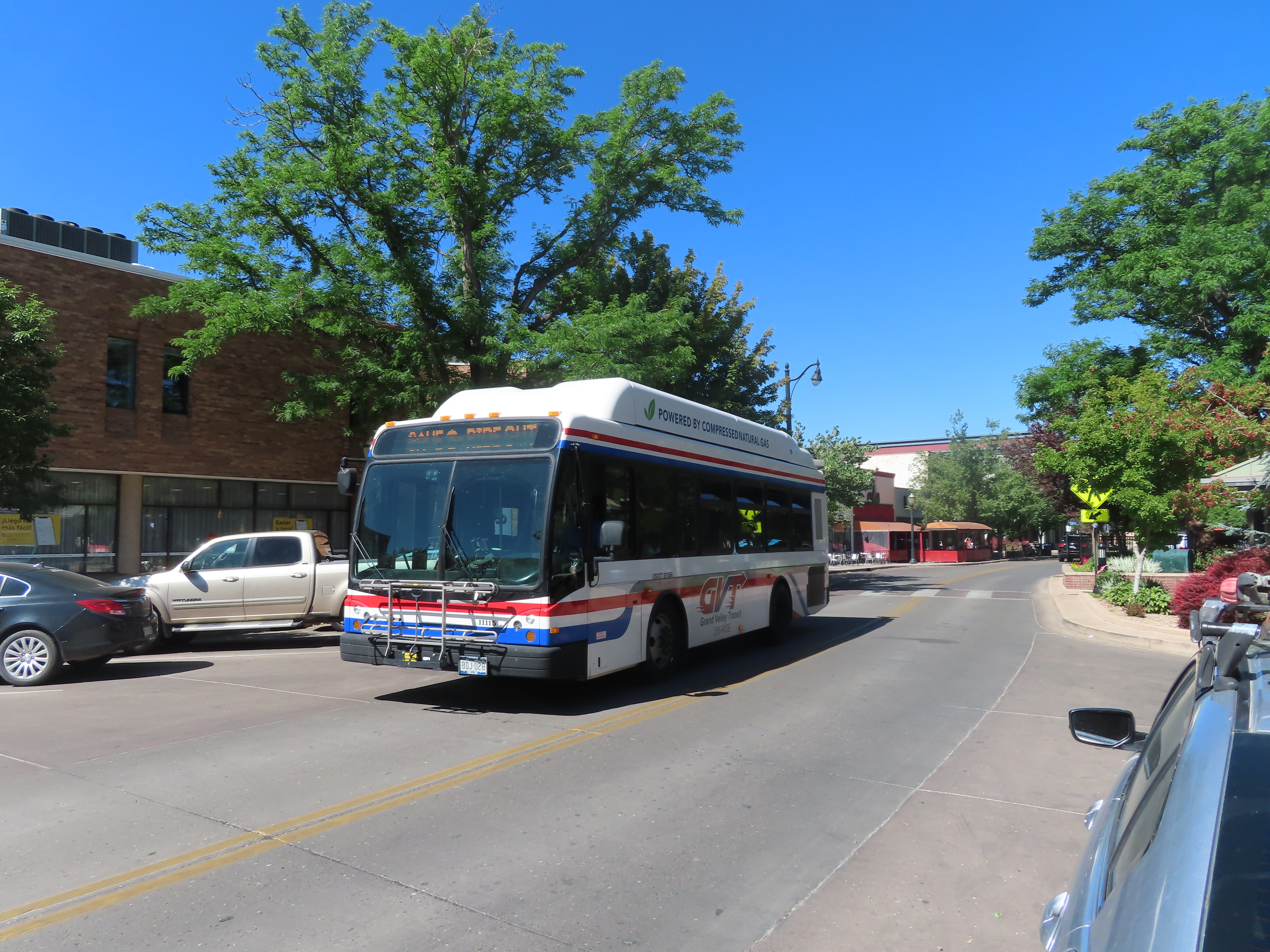
- Grand Valley Transit bus in downtown Grand Junction
- Parent: Grand Valley Regional Transportation Committee
- Headquarters: 525 S. 6th Street
- Locale: Grand Junction, Colorado
- Service area: Mesa County, Colorado
- Service type: bus service
- Routes: 11
- Daily ridership: 2,100 (weekdays, Q1 2025)
- Annual ridership: 630,700 (2024)
- Fuel type: Diesel
- Operator: Transdev
- Website: gvt.mesacounty.us

Grand Valley Transit is the public transportation agency that serves the Grand Junction area. Fixed route service began in 2000. Eleven routes run hourly on Monday through Saturday, with seven of them meeting in a downtown transit center. In 2024, the system had a ridership of 630,700, or about 2,100 per weekday as of the first quarter of 2025.

== Route list ==
- 1 Airport
- 2 Patterson Rd
- 3 Orchard Ave
- 4 Palisade
- 5 Midtown
- 6 Orchard Mesa
- 7 College Connector
- 8 Fruita
- 9 North Ave
- 10 Clifton
- 11 Shopping Malls

== See also ==
- List of bus transit systems in the United States
- Grand Junction station
