= Wm. J. Cassidy Tire Building =

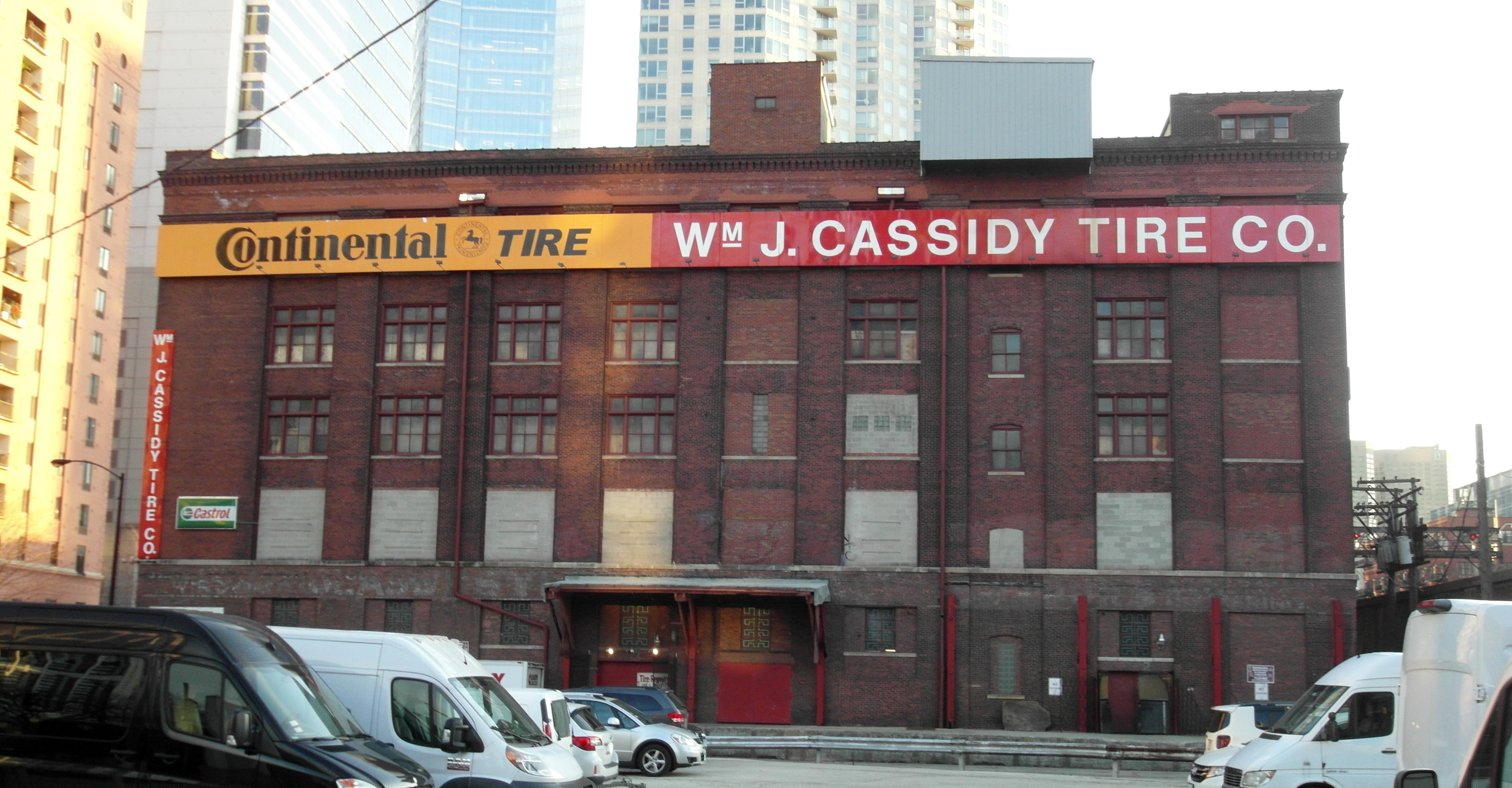
- Interactive map of the Wm. J. Cassidy Tire Building area

General information
- Architectural style: Chicago Commercial Style
- Location: 344 N. Canal Street, Chicago, Illinois
- Coordinates: 41°53′17.8″N 87°38′25.2″W
- Completed: 1902

Technical details
- Floor count: 5
- Floor area: 100,000 sq ft (9,300 m^{2})

Design and construction
- Architect: Henry J. Schlacks

The Wm. J. Cassidy Tire Building was a building at 344 N. Canal Street, Chicago, Illinois. Designed by Henry J. Schlacks and constructed in 1902, it originally served as a factory and warehouse for the Tyler & Hippach Mirror Co.

The site was purchased for redevelopment in February 2022, with demolition commencing shortly afterward. An apartment tower was erected on the site.

== History ==
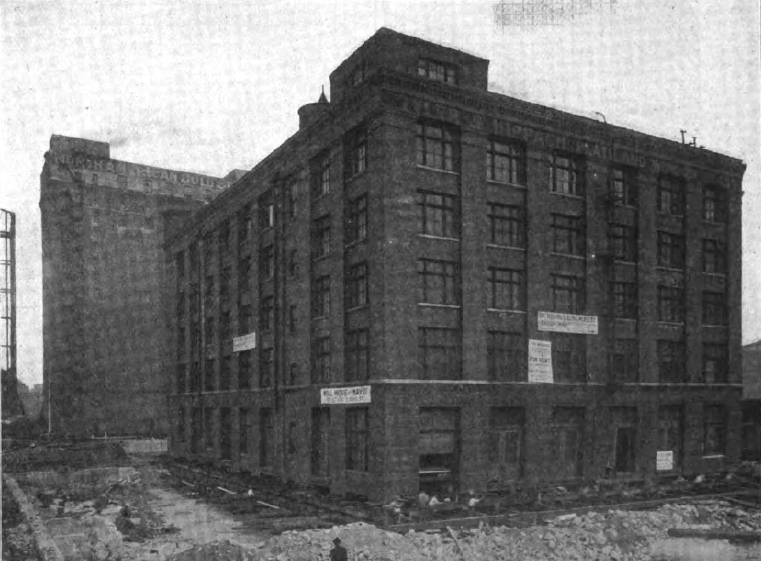
The Tyler & Hippach Mirror Co. building being moved

The building originally stood at 117–125 N. Clinton Street. In 1907, it was sold to the Chicago and Northwestern Railroad. In 1908, the building was moved 52 feet south and 168 feet east to its current location, (Note: Street number 344 N. Canal was 112 N. Canal before the 1909 street renumbering of Chicago.) in order to make way for the construction of the new Chicago and North Western Terminal, at a cost of $50,000. The William Grace Company was contracted to perform the move, and hired Chicago engineer Harvey Sheeler, who had successfully moved several large buildings previously. At the time, this was the largest building ever moved.

In 1929, the Chicago and Northwestern Railroad began leasing the building to Producers Warehouse. In 1947, the building was sold to the owner of Producers Warehouse for $75,000. William J. Cassidy Tire & Auto Supply Co. purchased the building for $250,000 in 1970, and it became the headquarters of Cassidy Tire.

In 2019, The Habitat Company signed a contract to purchase the property, with intent to demolish the building and build a 33 story apartment building on the site. However, Preservation Chicago fought to have the building designated a Chicago Landmark and preserved as part of the residential development planned for the site. In February 2021, Preservation Chicago listed the Wm. J. Cassidy Tire Building as one of Chicago's most endangered buildings.

Demolition began in March 2022, followed by groundbreaking that October.The new apartment complex, dubbed "Cassidy on Canal", was finished in 2024. Some of the original bricks of the Wm. J. Cassidy Tire Building were incorporated into the design.
