= St. Adalbert's in Chicago =

Coordinates: 41°51′32″N 87°40′4.3″W

St. Adalbert Church
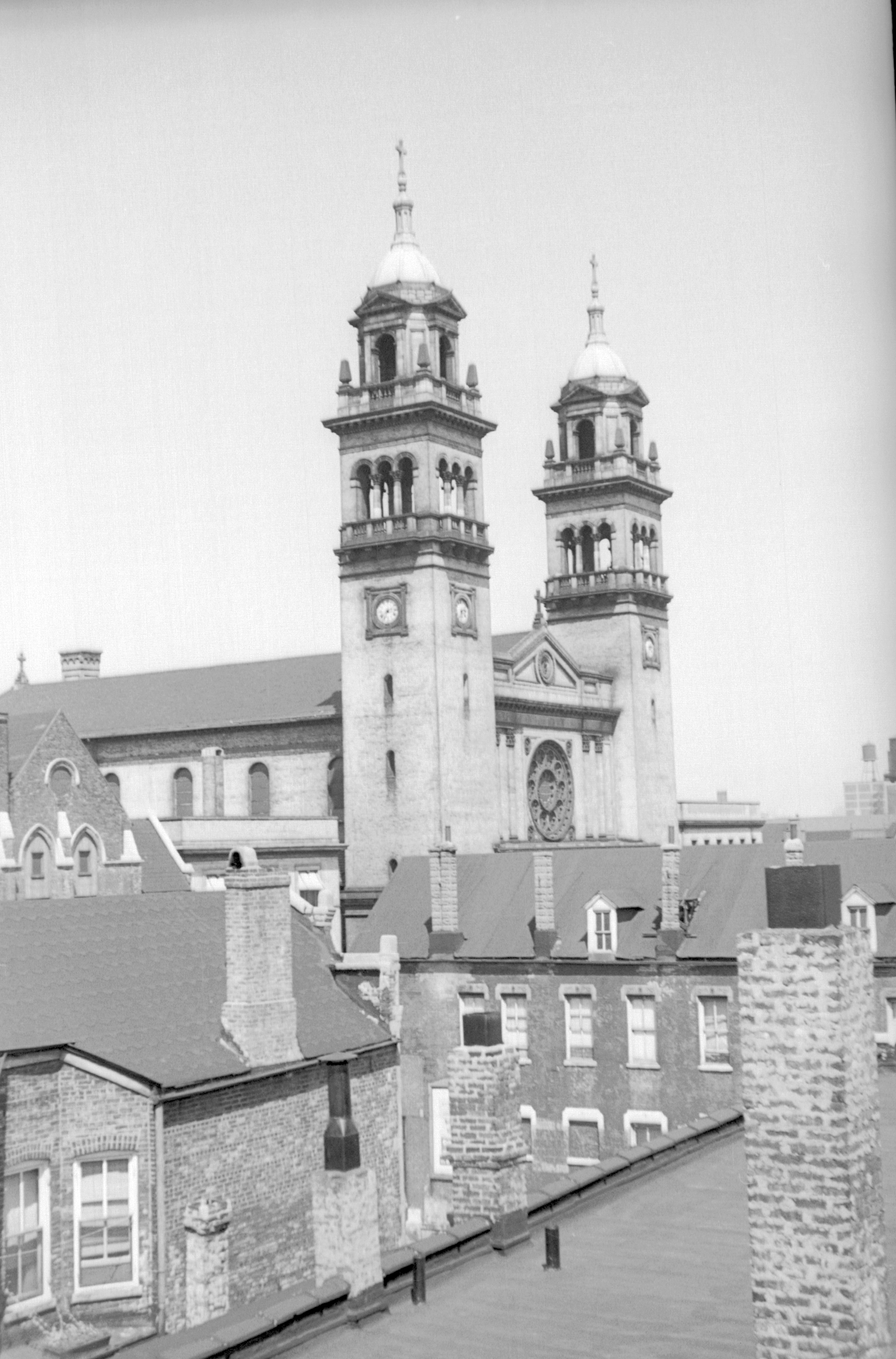
- St. Adalbert Church in 1951

- Location within the United States
- Location: Chicago
- Country: USA
- Denomination: Roman Catholic

History
- Founded: 1874
- Founder: Polish immigrants
- Dedication: St. Adalbert
- Dedicated: September 20, 1914

Architecture
- Functional status: Active
- Heritage designation: For Polish immigrants
- Architect: Henry J. Schlacks
- Architectural type: Church
- Style: Roman Basilica/Polish Cathedral
- Groundbreaking: June 30, 1912
- Completed: 1914
- Construction cost: $200,000
- Closed: July 15, 2019

Specifications
- Materials: Brick

St. Adalbert Church (Polish: Kościół Świętego Wojciecha) is a historic church of the Roman Catholic Archdiocese of Chicago. The church is located on 17th Street between Paulina Street and Ashland Avenue in the Pilsen neighborhood of Chicago, Illinois. St. Adalbert has served generations of Polish immigrants and their American-born children; at its peak, parish membership numbered 4,000 families with more than 2,000 children enrolled in the school. Today, the church is an anchor for the Mexican immigrants that have made the Pilsen area their home.

The church is named after St. Adalbert of Prague.

In June 2019, the Archdiocese of Chicago announced that the church would permanently close on July 15, 2019.

== History of Saint Adalbert Parish ==
St. Adalbert parish was founded in 1874 by the Polish Catholic community in Chicago's Pilsen neighborhood. By the time of the church's centennial celebration, the congregation had predominantly Mexican heritage, reflective of greater changes in the surrounding neighborhood. For many years the church held masses in both Polish and Spanish. A shrine of the Mexican patroness Our Lady of Guadalupe is part of the church premises.

In 2016, the Archdiocese of Chicago announced that St. Adalbert Church would be closed due to low mass attendance, changing demographics, decline in the overall number of priests, and over $3 million in repairs needed to maintain the church's crumbling buildings. The final mass at St. Adalbert was held on July 14, 2019, and the congregation has been combined with the nearby St. Paul Catholic Church.

== Church design and decoration ==
The church and adjoining rectory were designed by the prolific Chicago catholic church architect, Henry J. Schlacks. It was completed at an estimated cost of $200,000.

The interior is modeled after the papal basilica of San Paolo fuori le mura (built between 386 AD and ca. 450, burned 1823 and rebuilt 1825-1854) and closely resembles several other churches designed by Schlacks including the St. Mary of the Lake in Chicago (1913-1917. Not to be confused with the seminary of the same name), Resurrection in Chicago (1914-1917. Later demolished), St. Mark's in Cincinnati (1914-1916), St. Joan of Arc in Indianapolis (1928–29), and the Chapel of Our Lady of the Blessed Sacrament in Marytown/Libertyville, Illinois (1928-1932. Since 2000, the National Shrine of St. Maximilian Kolbe). The Roman basilica style was first brought to the United States from Germany and the United Kingdom around 1905 through the dioceses of Pittsburgh and Buffalo and Schlacks was one of its earliest advocates. Although the nave of St. Adalbert is inspired by Roman churches which pre-date the Renaissance, the exterior is dressed symmetrically with a pair of 185-foot baroque towers to conform its overall appearance with the so-called 'Polish Cathedral style' befitting the parish church of a largely Polish congregation. In this case, Schlacks seems to have taken the towers of the nineteenth-century St. Stephen's Basilica in Budapest as his loose inspiration.

Entrance is through a shallow portico with eight massive grey-flecked, rose-colored polished granite columns, from there to pass through a narrow vestibule with four large recessed fonts in its back wall, and finally to enter the immense main body which has the most magnificent marble work to be found in any church in Chicago.

A stern large white-marble statue of the church's patron St. Adalbert, the evangelizer of Poland and martyr, stares down from the massive and elaborate thirty-five ton Cararra marble altar whose ten spiral pillars are capped with a dome-shaped ciborium. On the chancel arch above the altar are inscribed the opening words of the Polish hymn Bogurodzica which Adalbert himself is said to have composed. And in an F. X. Zettler window to the west, Adalbert again, in green vestments, stands preaching to the surly, slumped Prussian, an unwilling listener whose response would be to martyr Adalbert. Legend says that the King of Poland Bolesław I ransomed back Adalbert's body by paying its weight in gold.

The original balustered white-marble altar rail complements the white marble of the many-tiered altar behind and above it and serves the additional aesthetic purpose of visually reinforcing the line made by the pilasters which demark the north wall. The altar rail also complements the original high, white marble pulpit. Square and elaborately carved with large figures of the four evangelists on its corners and smaller figures of the six prophets on its sides, it rises west of the sanctuary against one of the ponderous beige-and-grey marble pillars with gold capitals that line the nave on either side. The white- marble side altars have paintings of Our Lady and Saint Joseph respectively instead of the more customary statues. The original east transept marble shrine holding the Pietà (once matched by a similar shrine in the west transept) is still intact.

The mural on the upper portion of the north wall above the sanctuary portrays on the left the wedding of Queen Jadwiga of Poland and Prince Jagiello of Lithuania and on the right the 1655 victory of Our Lady of Częstochowa when by the Virgin's intervention an army of 9,000 invading Swedes failed to take a monastery held by only 250 monks. The predominant muted orange-red tones of the mural are repeated in the present color of the ambulatory wall and also in the ceiling coffers and panels of the clerestory. Although these panels and coffers are painted in this solid color today, it is possible that they were originally intended for murals such as the large ones of St. Francis and St. Anthony in the west transept and the others of various subjects that have been completed in the panels around the main lower body of the church.

The pews retain their period-authentic molasses-dark varnish; both their finish and their classical broken-curve top ornamentation matches that of the original confessionals in the east transept. On the south (or entrance) end of the church rises a spectacular two-story choir loft with curving ranges of organ pipes on either side and a rose window of St. Cecilia in the center. The aisle floors are a handsome inlay of sections of red, black, and gray terrazzo .

== Alterations and losses ==
Several rows of pews have been removed from the back, truncating Schlacks's long processional aisle. The floor where the pews were removed has been patched with vinyl tile that attempts to match the pattern and colors of the surrounding tan and black terrazzo floor.

The original nave chandeliers are gone.

The original brass communion rail is gone.

The west transept shrine has been truncated to accommodate a new baptistry.

A large polychrome rood (crucifix) which may have originally hung in the sanctuary has been placed in the remaining portion of the west transept shrine to which has been added a false back to bring the surface out to meet the back of the crucifix.

== Church in architecture books ==
- Sinkevitch, Alice (2004). The AIA Guide to Chicago. Harvest Books.
- Schulze, Franz; Harrington, Kevin (2003). Chicago's Famous Buildings. University Of Chicago Press.
- McNamara, Denis R. (2005). Heavenly City: The Architectural Tradition of Catholic Chicago. Liturgy Training Publications.
- Chiat, Marylin (2004). The Spiritual Traveler: Chicago and Illinois: A Guide to Sacred Sites and Peaceful Places. HiddenSpring.
- Lane, George A. (1982). Chicago Churches and Synagogues: An Architectural Pilgrimage. Loyola Press.
- Kantowicz, Edward R. (2007). The Archdiocese of Chicago: A Journey of Faith. Booklink.
- Kociolek, Jacek (2002). Kościoły Polskie w Chicago {Polish Churches of Chicago} (in Polish). Ex Libris.

== See also ==
- Polish Cathedral style churches of Chicago
- Polish Americans
- Poles in Chicago
- Sr. Mary Stanisia
- Tadeusz Żukotyński
- Roman Catholicism in Poland
