= Henry Schlacks =

Church architect (1867-1938)

Henry John Schlacks (July 4, 1867 – January 6, 1938) was primarily known as an ecclesiologist in a 19th Century sense of the word, meaning one who designs and decorates churches. He was from Chicago, Illinois, and is considered by many to be the finest of Chicago's church architects. Schlacks trained at MIT and in the offices of Adler & Sullivan before starting his own practice. He founded the Architecture Department at the University of Notre Dame and designed several buildings in the Chicago area.

== Churches ==
Among the Churches that Schlacks designed are:

Chicago:

- St. Adalbert Church
- St. Anthony Church
- St. Boniface Church
- St. Clara Church (later St. Gelasius Church)
- St. Ignatius Church
- St. Ita Church
- St. John of God Church
- St. Mary of the Lake Church, 1917
- St. Paul Church
- St. Martin of Tours Church (Schlacks was supervising architect for this building, plans supplied by a German architect)
- Angel Gurdian Croatian Catholic Mission Church

Evanston, Il

- St. Nicholas Church

Forest Park, Illinois

- St. John Lutheran Church

Oak Park, Illinois:

- St. Edmund Church

Skokie, Illinois:

- St. Peter Church

Indianapolis, IN

- St. Joan of Arc Church

Topeka, KS

- Holy Name-Mater Dei Church

Cincinnati, OH

- St. Mark Church

== Other works ==
- Denver & Rio Grande Western Railroad Depot, Grand Junction, Colorado, 1906
- Denver & Rio Grande Western Depot, Salt Lake City, Utah, 1910
- Idaho Building (Boise, Idaho)
- Wm. J. Cassidy Tire Building, Chicago, Illinois, 1902

== Gallery ==
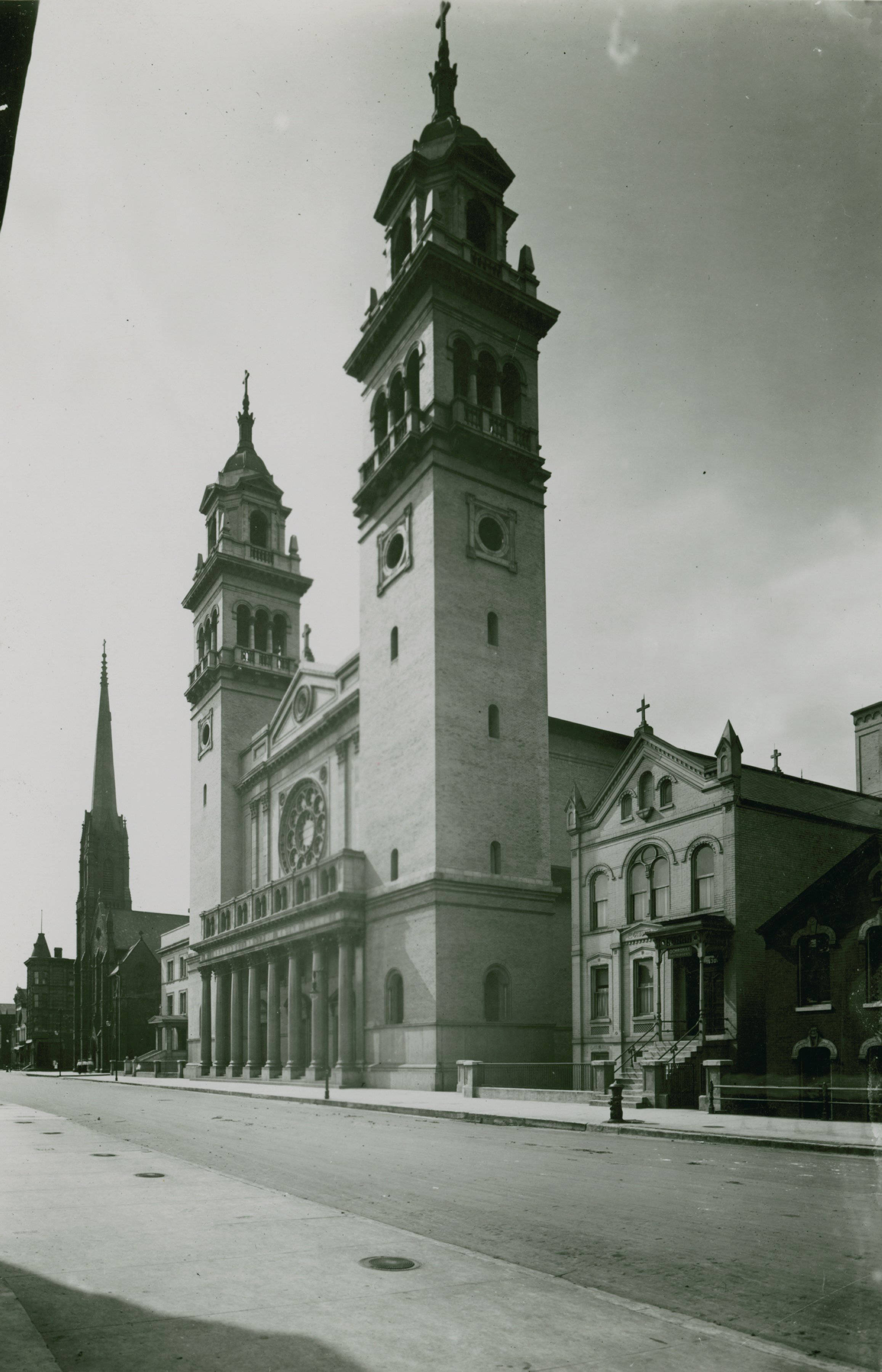
St Adalbert, Chicago, Illinois

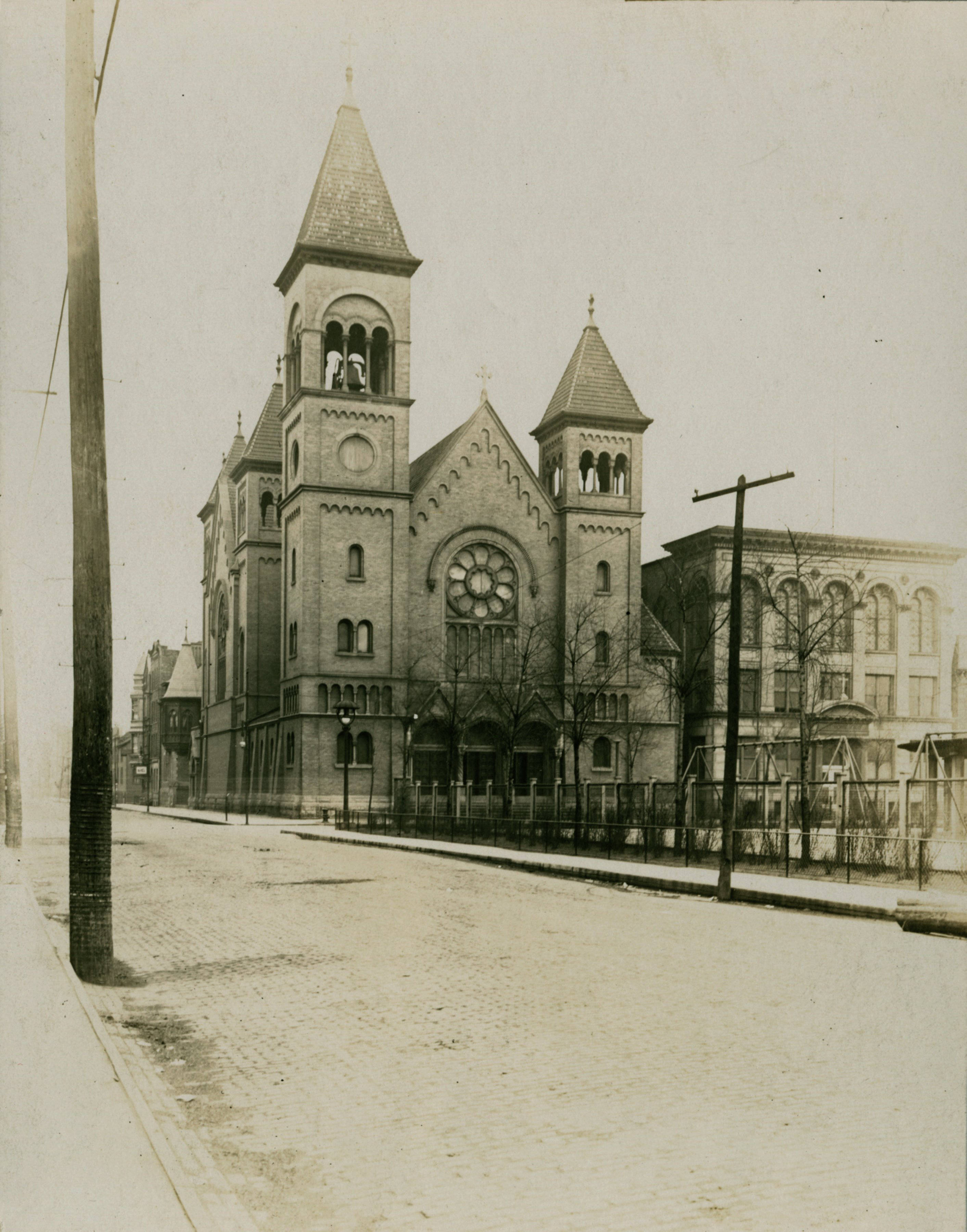
St Boniface, Chicago, Illinois

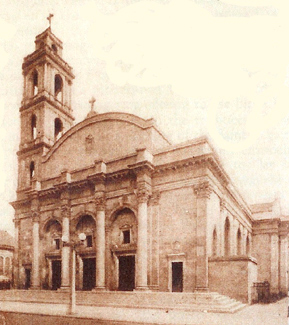
St Clara, Chicago, Illinois

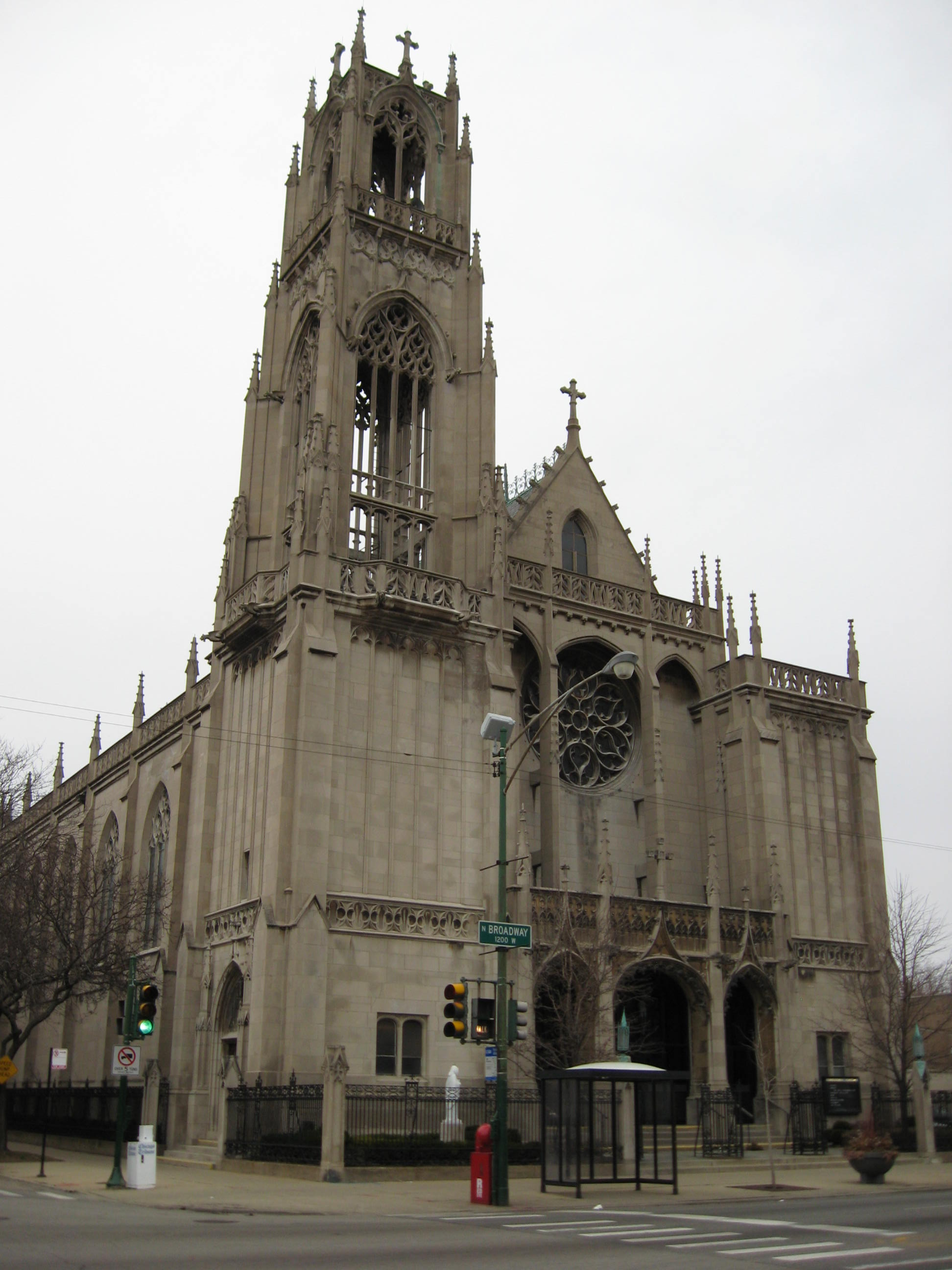
St Ita, Chicago, Illinois

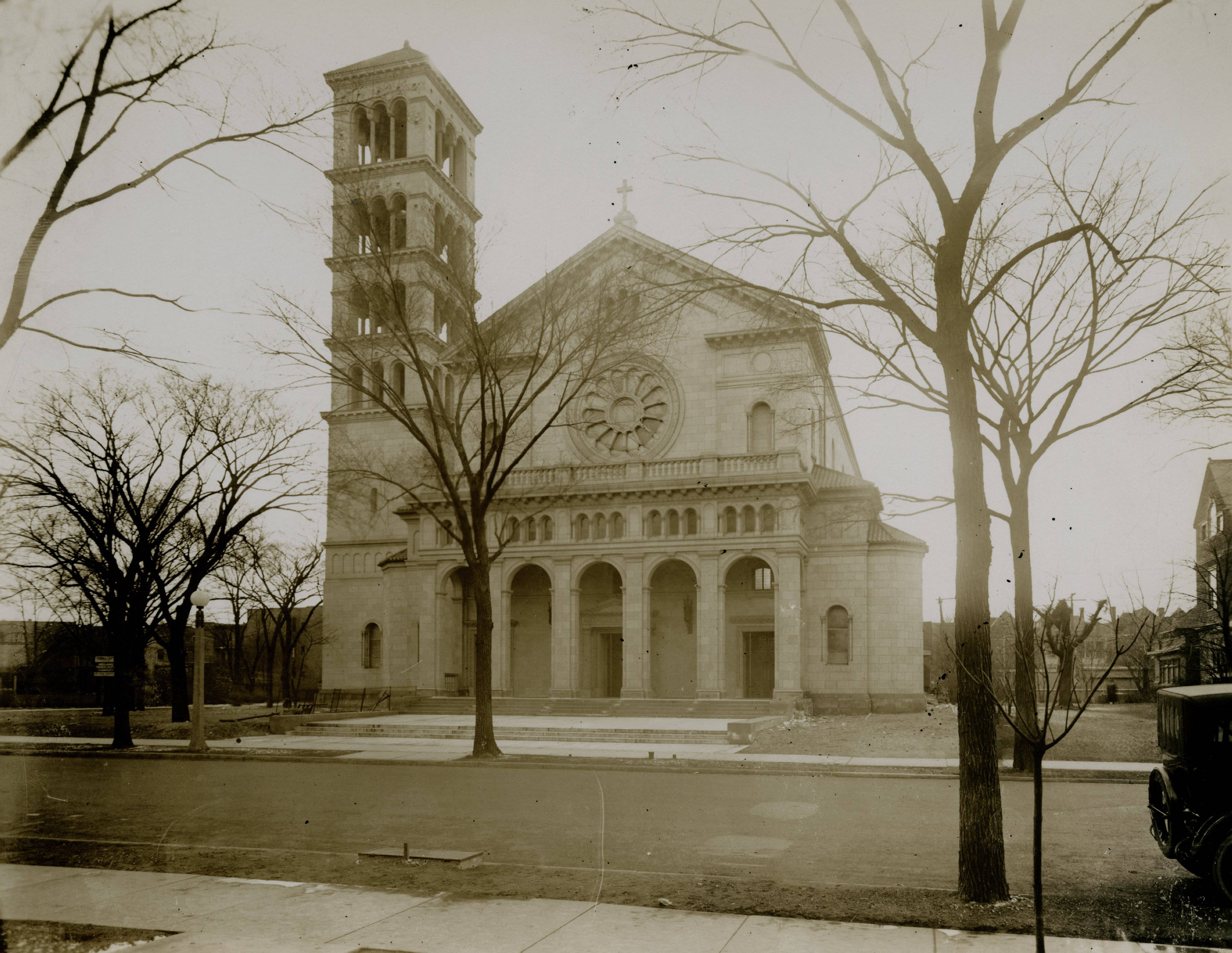
St Mary of the Lake, Chicago, Illinois

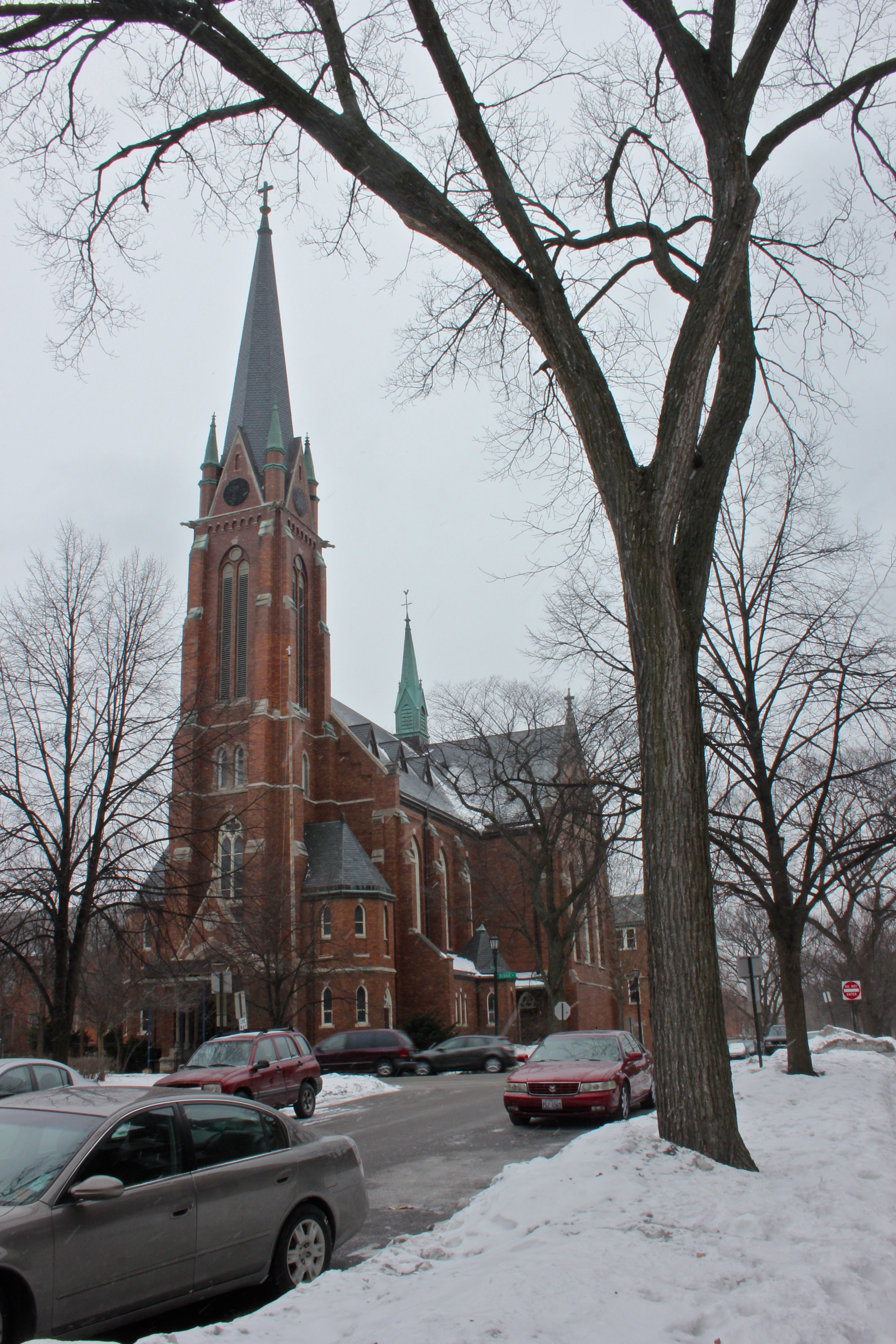
St Nicholas, Evanston, Illinois

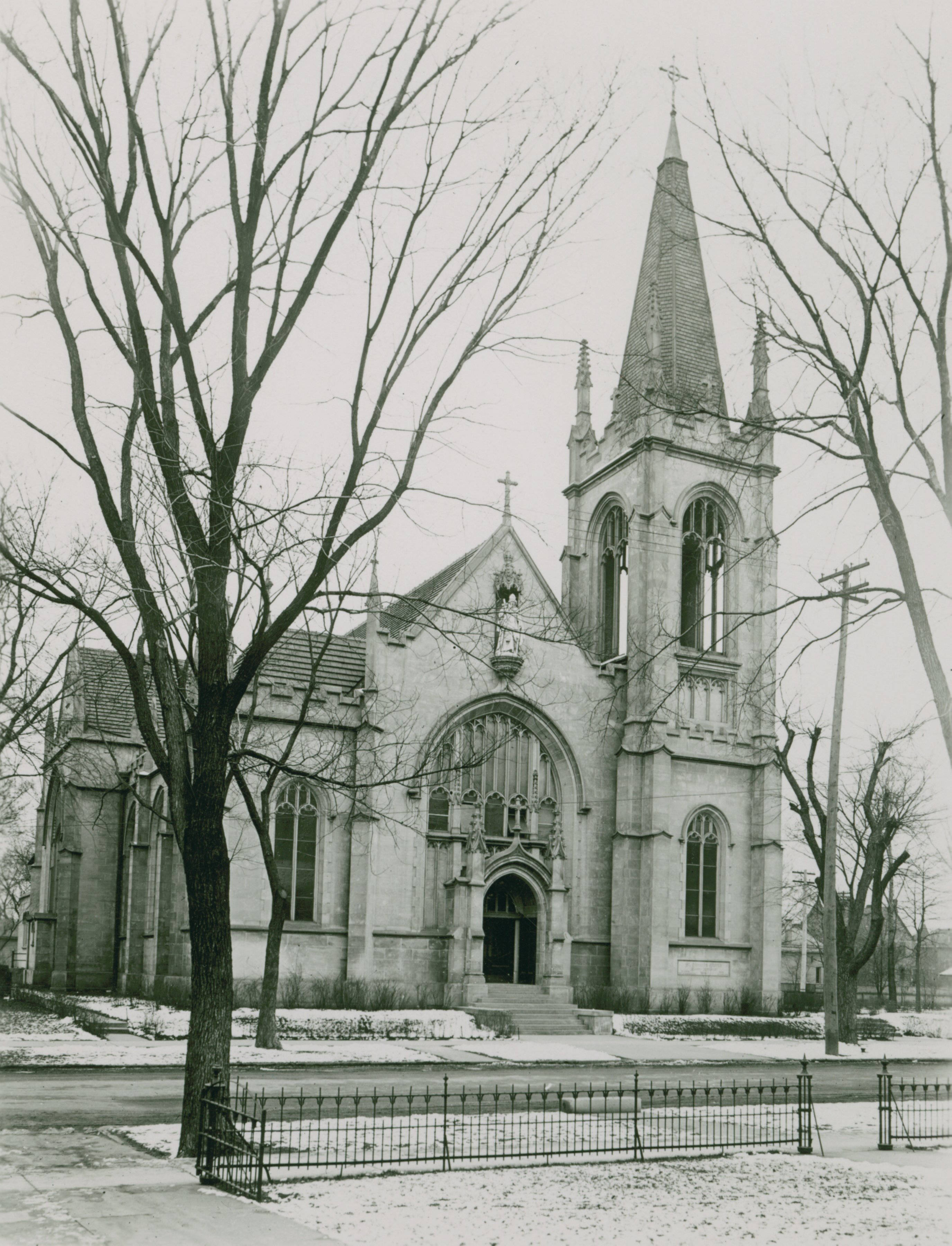
St Edmund, Oak Park

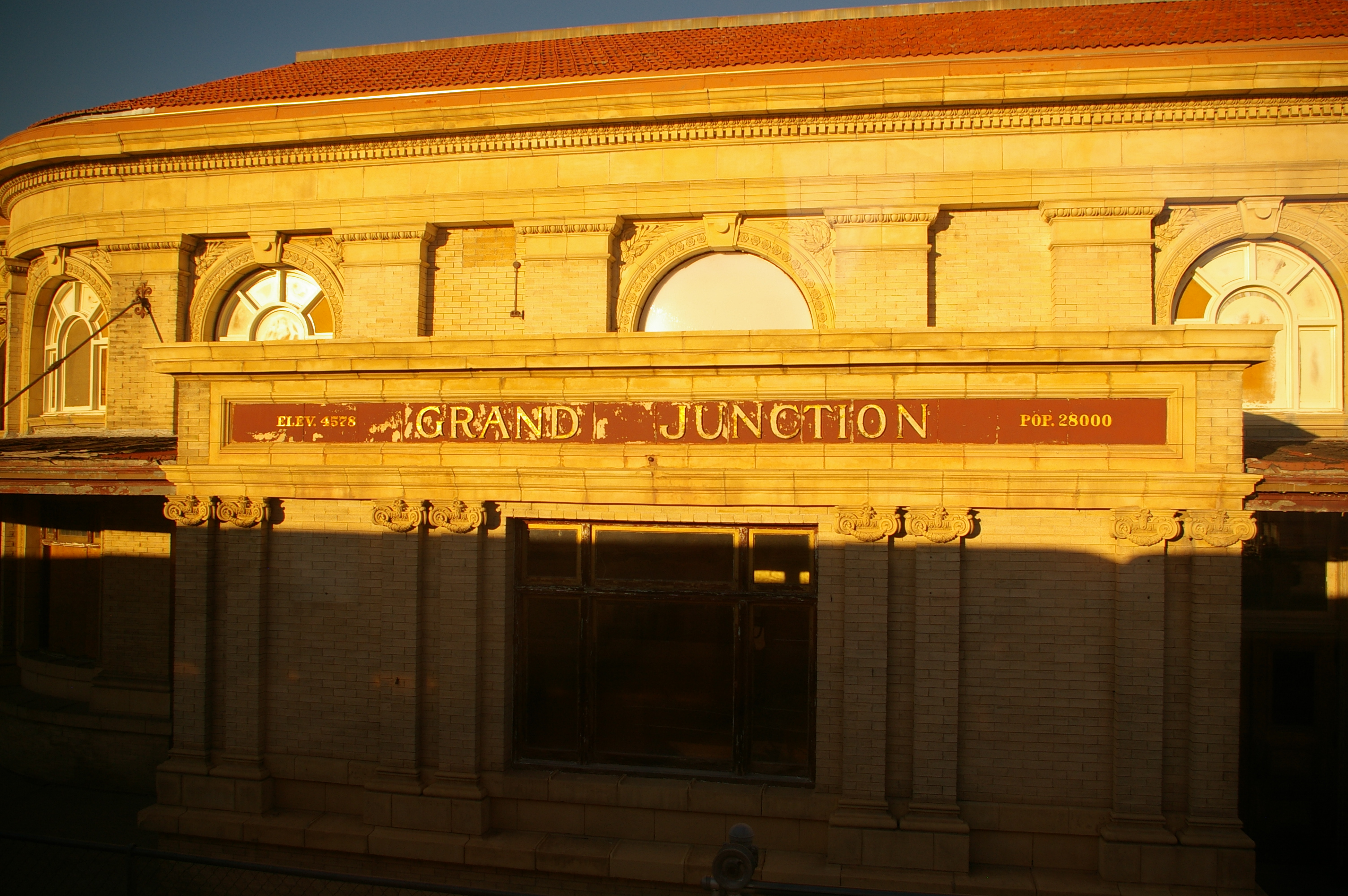
D&RGW Depot, Grand Junction, Colorado

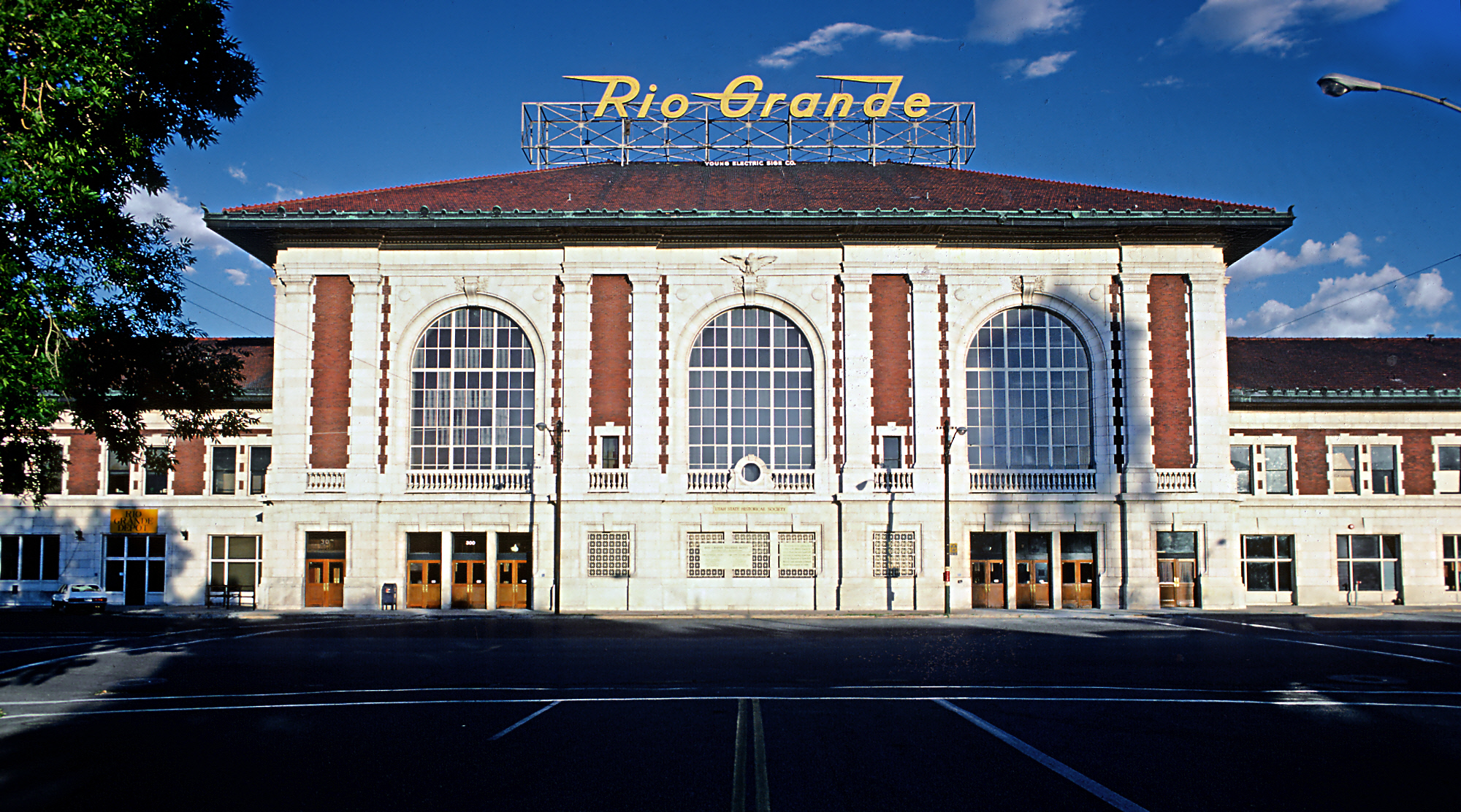
D&RGW Depot, Salt Lake City, Utah

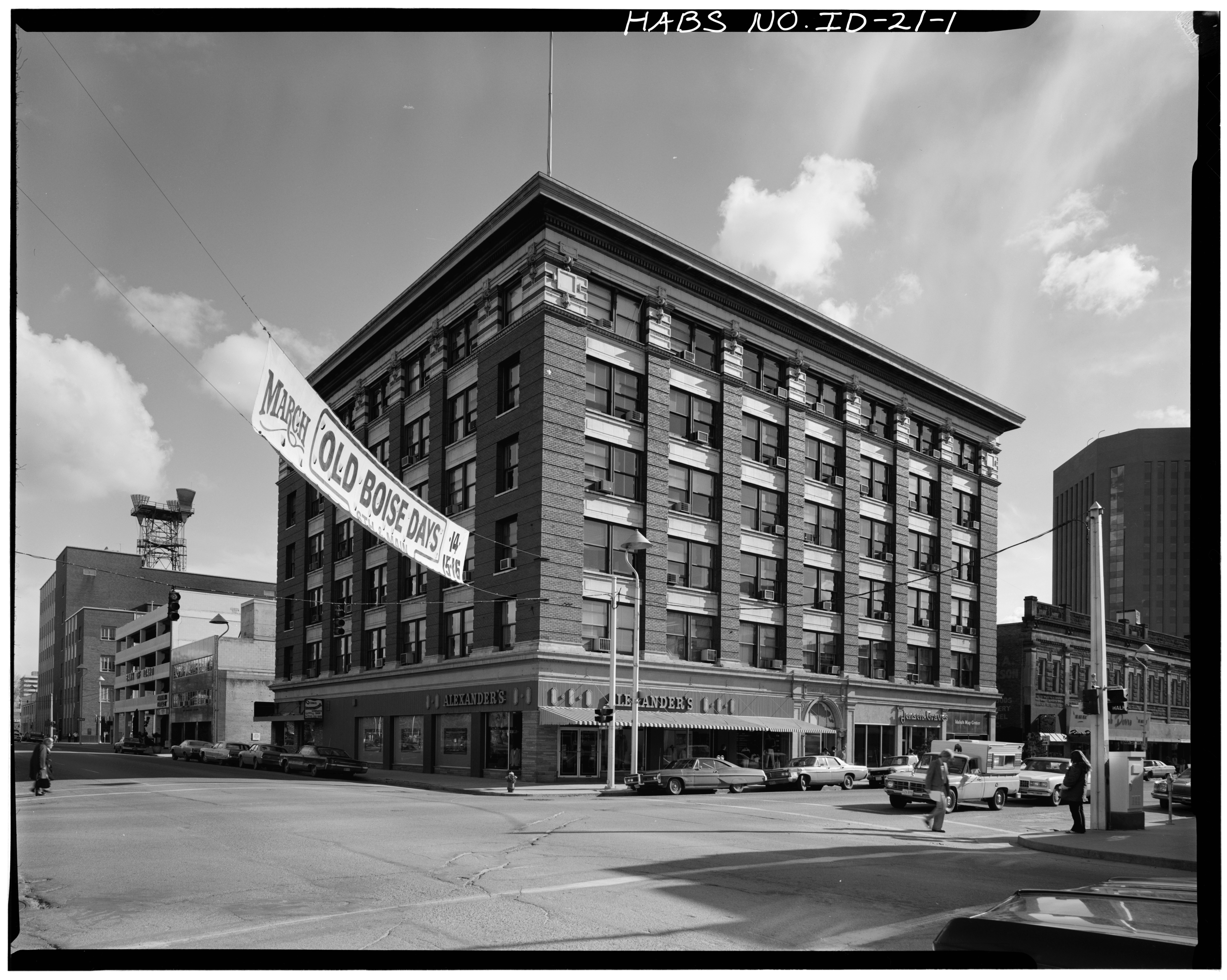
Idaho Building, Boise, Idaho

== See also ==
- Polish Cathedral style
