= Denver and Rio Grande Western Railroad Depot (Grand Junction, Colorado) =

- U.S. National Register of Historic Places
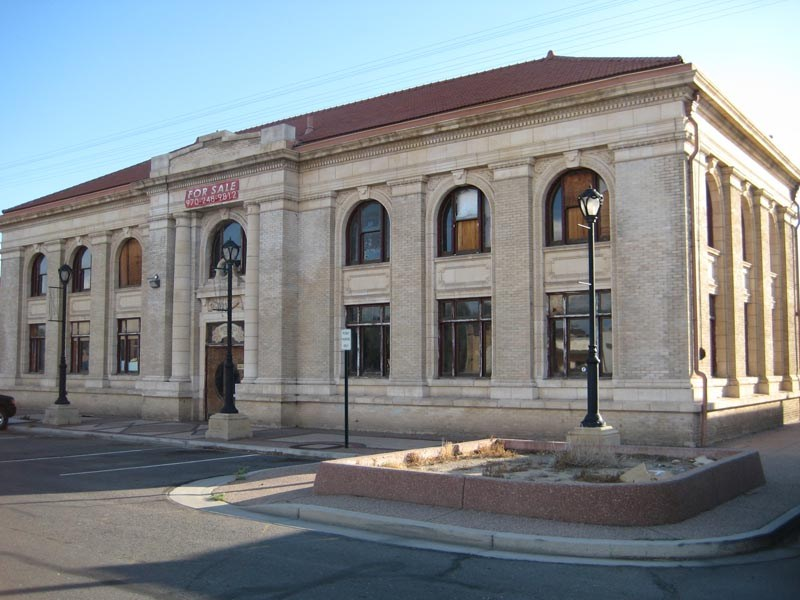
- Anterior view of the Denver and Rio Grande Western Railroad Depot in Grand Junction, Colorado

- Location within Colorado Location within the United States
- Nearest city: Grand Junction, Colorado
- Coordinates: 39°03′51″N 108°34′09″W
- Area: 119 Pitkin Avenue, Grand Junction, CO 81501
- Built: 1905
- Architect: Henry Schlacks, William Simpson Construction Company
- Architectural style: Italian Renaissance-style
- NRHP reference No.: 92001190
- Added to NRHP: March 1988

The Denver and Rio Grande Western Railroad Depot is a disused railroad depot and train station listed on the National Register of Historic Places. It is located at 119 Pitkin Avenue next to the still-in-use Grand Junction station in downtown Grand Junction, Colorado.

== Background ==
=== Location ===
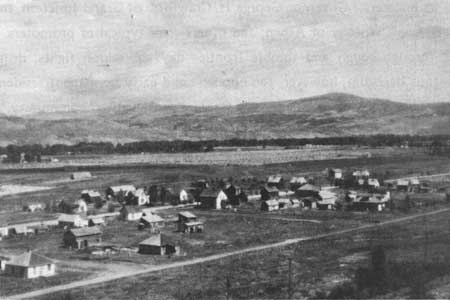
Grand Junction, Colorado in the 1880s

The town of Grand Junction was founded on September 26, 1881, by the Grand Junction Town Company. The founder of the town, George A. Crawford, was a Civil War veteran and President of the Grand Junction Town Company. He was accompanied by William McGinley, J. Clayton Nichols, and four unidentified companions. By 1882, the settlement had expanded into a much larger town. The town had become known for its agriculture, trade, mining, and as a stop for stagecoaches. The community leaders brokered a deal with the Denver & Rio Grande Western Railroad to bring their western route through the town. The first train arrived at Grand Junction on November 22, 1882, cementing the town's place as a major settlement on the Colorado Western Slope.

== History ==
=== Construction ===
Prior to the construction of the station, there had been a number of different smaller stations and repair yards built with simple-log structures. By 1905, the town of Grand Junction had grown to approximately 7,000 inhabitants. This led to the decision to build a new station, much larger and more ornate than any before it. Construction efforts began on the station on April 6, 1905. The design of the depot was that of Henry John Schlacks, an architect from Chicago known later in life for designing churches, on behalf of the Denver & Rio Grande Western Railroad and the William Simpson Construction Company of Denver, Colorado.

=== Expense ===
The station was built at a considerable cost and grandeur for both the time and location it was built in. The design called for $60,000 (over $1.5 million in 2020), with a further $15,000 (approx. $400,000) being spent to renovate and improve the grounds around the station. The design of the station can be described as 'Italian-Renaissance'. The primary material used is white brick with terracotta used for accent and ornamentation. The choice in building material, design, and scale made the station the most handsome, expensive, and sizable railroad depot in the region.

=== Operations ===
One of the most notable routes to pass through the station was that of the California Zephyr. The California Zephyr was the last major privately owned and operated railway network in the United States. Although the route still exists under Amtrak's successor to the original California Zephyr, the stop was moved next door to the Grand Junction station in 1992.

Other notable routes include the Desert Wind line between Chicago and Los Angeles, and the Pioneer that ran between Chicago and East Bay. Both services rerouted to stop at Grand Junction station in 1983. The National Park Service describes the most significant years of the station as being between 1925 and 1949.

Amtrak last stopped at the station in 1992 before moving next door to Grand Junction station.

== Today ==
The station was listed on the National Register of Historic Places on September 8, 1992. Over the years, the station has fallen into a state of disrepair. The windows are boarded and the interior has become largely dilapidated. The exterior of the structure can be described as being in a fair condition, with much of its original features, facades, and decorations remaining intact.

In 2016, real estate developers Veronica Sanchez and Dustin Anzures bought the building and are planning to restore it in 2024.

== See also ==
- Henry Schlacks
- Grand Junction station
- Rio Grande Depot (Salt Lake City)
- Denver and Rio Grande Western Railroad
