= St. Ita's Church =

Coordinates: 41.9820°N 87.6603°W

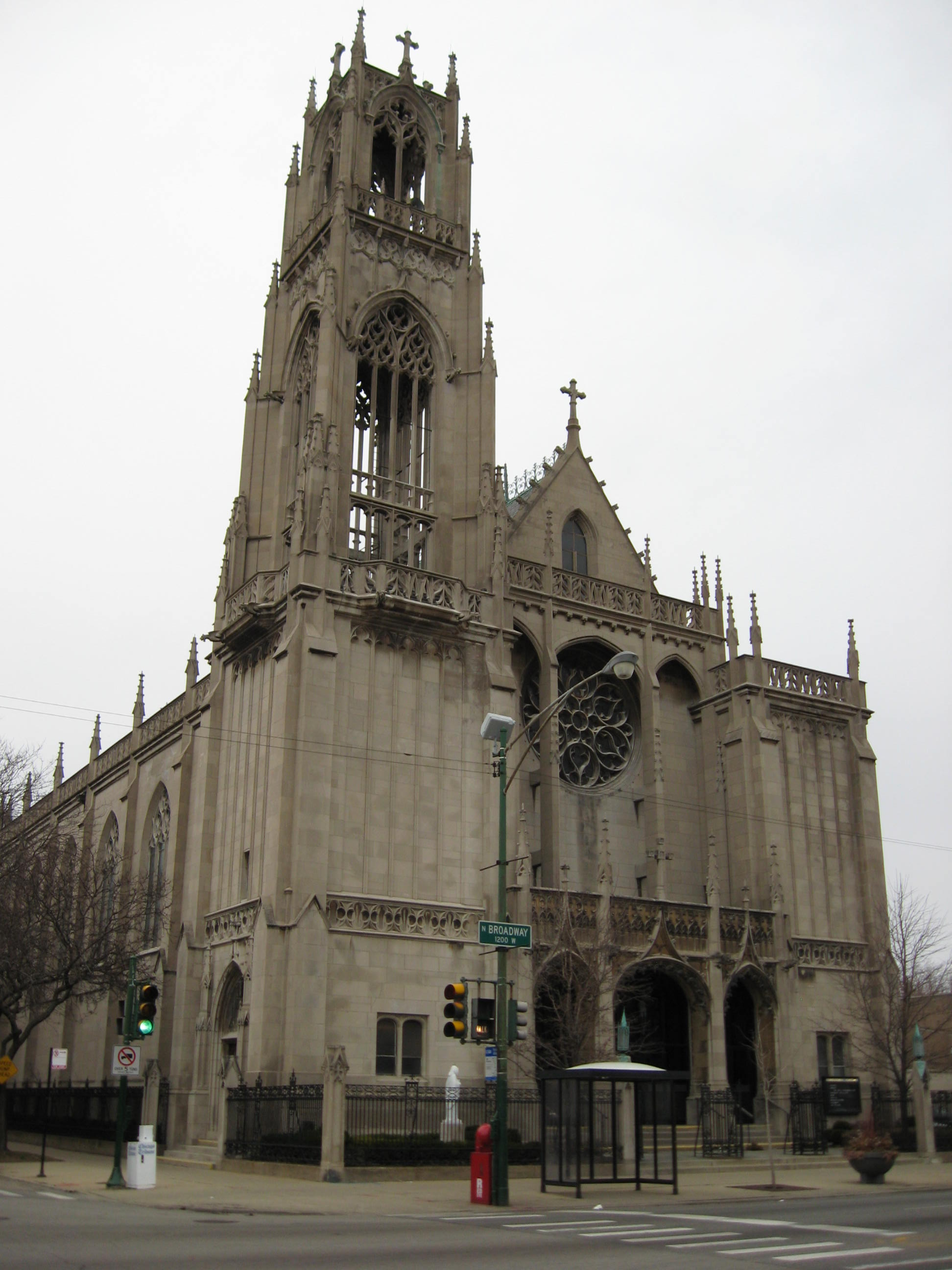
- St. Ita's Church
- St. Ita's Church
- Address: 5500 North Broadway, Chicago, Illinois 60640
- Denomination: Roman Catholic

Architecture
- Architect: Henry J. Schlacks
- Style: French Gothic
- Completed: 1927

Specifications
- Materials: Bedford limestone

St. Ita's Church is a Roman Catholic church in the Edgewater neighborhood of Chicago. The church building was designed by Henry J. Schlacks in the Neo-Gothic style and completed in 1927. It is located at 5500 North Broadway.
