= Oakland Wye =

Rapid transit junction in Oakland, California

Coordinates: 37.8008°N 122.2729°W

The Oakland Wye is an underground flying wye junction in downtown Oakland, California which serves the Bay Area Rapid Transit (BART) system. Trains can switch between (a) the northbound Richmond or Antioch lines (first station: 12th Street Oakland City Center, underground), (b) the westbound San Francisco lines (first station: West Oakland, elevated), and (c) the southbound Berryessa or Dublin/Pleasanton lines (first station: Lake Merritt, underground). The Oakland Wye is the center of the BART system (all mileposts measure distance from the wye), and is a bottleneck for the whole system because every regularly scheduled BART train (except for the Oakland Airport Connector and eBART) passes through it.

== Design ==
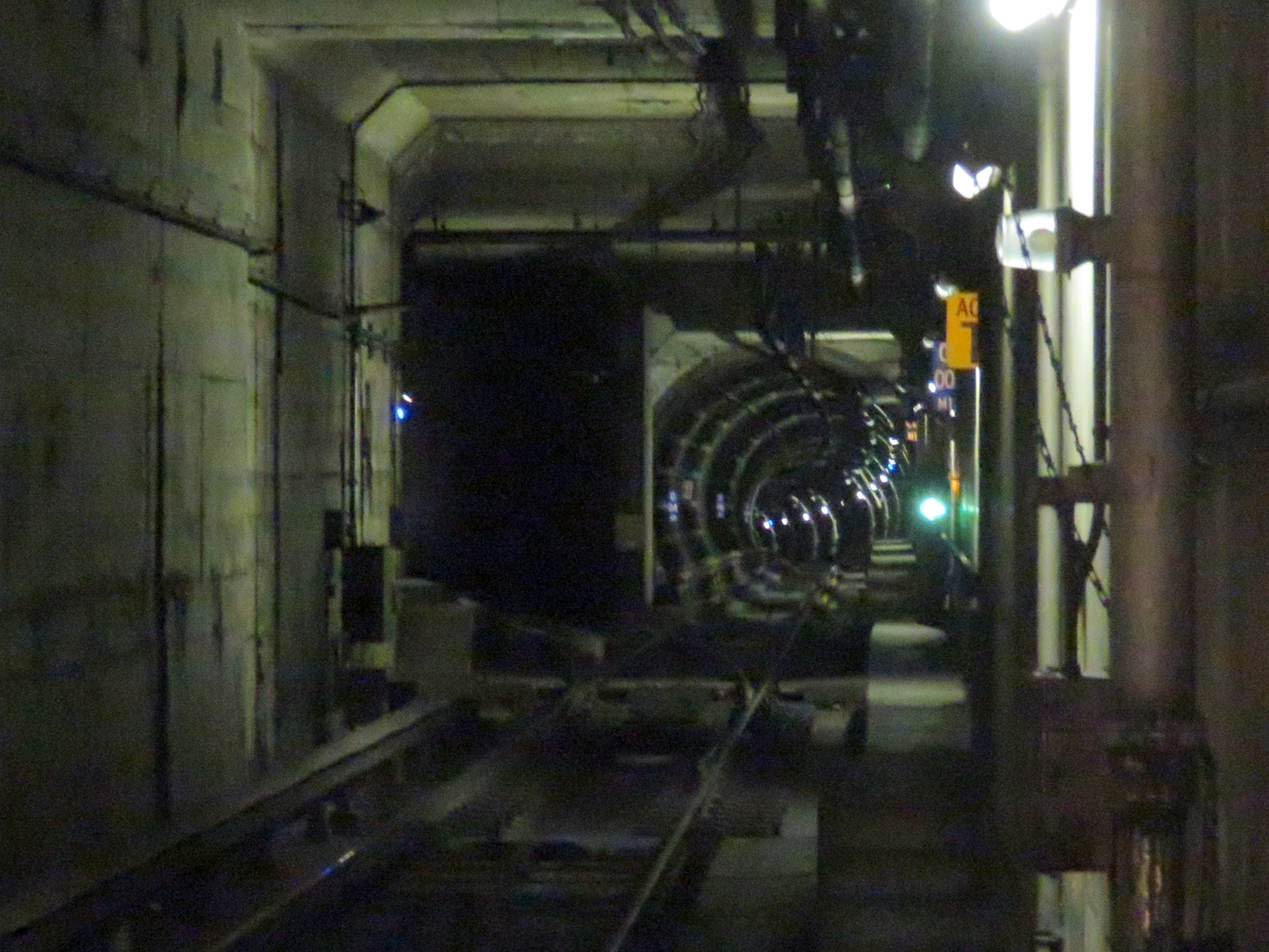
A junction in the Oakland Wye viewed from the lower platform at 12th Street station

Colorized schematic of the Oakland Wye. A train approaching from any of its three branches may exit via either of the remaining two, without interfering with trains on any other route. An additional third track (MX/CX) provides additional capacity.

The wye is a flying junction that is approximately centered underneath Broadway and 9th Streets. Trains coming from the underground 12th Street Oakland City Center station (with platforms on two levels) approach the wye from underneath Broadway and those from the underground Lake Merritt station approach from approximately underneath 9th Street. Those trains coming from the elevated West Oakland station enter tunnel portals near Washington and 5th Streets before turning towards Broadway. An additional third track (labeled MX/CX in the schematic diagram) provides additional capacity between West Oakland and 12th Street, and is normally used by Antioch-bound trains. Emergency exit/access points are located in a small building at 7th & Broadway with access to the A and M lines and a sidewalk hatch at 9th & Harrison with access to the A and C lines.

The original operating speed through most of the Oakland Wye was intended to be 27 mph (43 km/h). Design problems led BART operations to impose a lower 18 mph (29 km/h) speed limit on most tracks. Although the design has since been corrected, the speed restrictions remain as a cautionary measure. The center "CX" track connecting West Oakland station to 12th Street is the only track with a higher operating speed of 36 mph (58 km/h) through the Wye.

== History ==
=== Construction ===
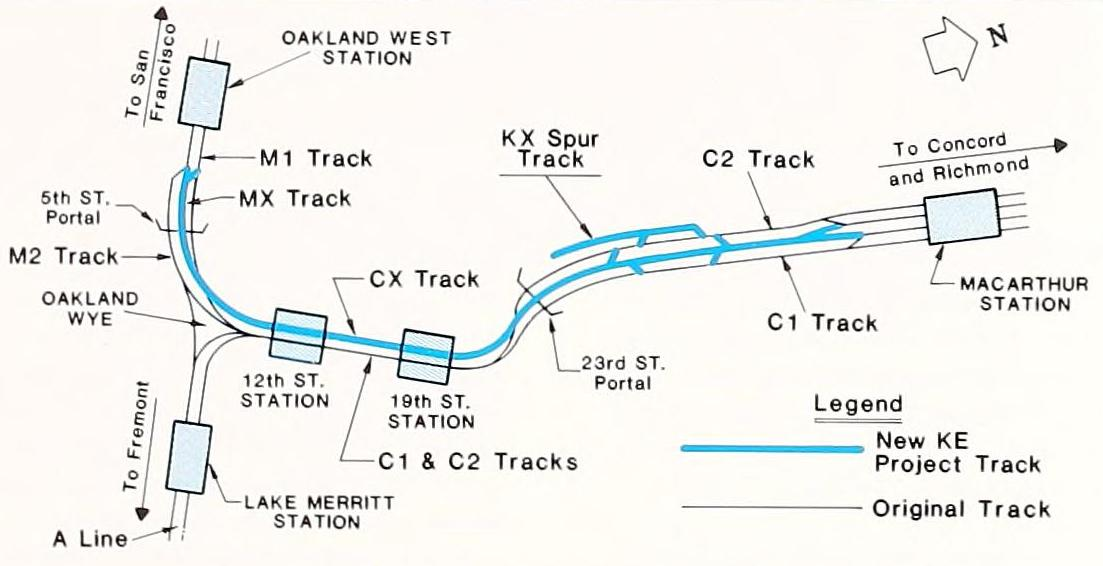
Map of the project, which added a third track (in blue) to provide additional capacity between West Oakland (and points west) and 12th Street (and points north/east).

Early plans called for the Wye to be centered underneath Broadway and 8th Street, but this was later changed to Broadway and 9th. This required a tighter turn between Lake Merritt station and 12th Street/Oakland City Center and, consequently, lower speeds through the Wye. There is some evidence that then-Oakland mayor John C. Houlihan objected to the original 8th Street location because it threatened a store owned by a friend of his.

A third track (labeled MX/CX in the above schematic diagram) connecting West Oakland, 12th Street Oakland City Center, 19th Street Oakland, and MacArthur stations was completed in 1986. Originally the MX/CX was used for peak hour service (westbound towards San Francisco in the morning, and eastbound in the evening). Since 1992, it has been used almost entirely for eastbound Yellow Line trains, allowing for cross-platform transfers with Orange Line trains.

=== Incidents ===
On December 17, 1992, a southbound train (operating on northbound track C1 due to maintenance) split a switch at the north end of the wye, injuring 14 passengers.

In February 2000, automatic train controls failed due to a loose cable and trains through the Oakland Wye were forced to operate in manual and slow to 5–10 mph (8.0–16.1 km/h) when switching tracks.

In February 2009, two northbound trains from West Oakland and Lake Merritt (one operating in manual mode) collided and partially derailed in the Wye while merging to approach 12th Street/Oakland City Center.

== Future ==
Bypasses that would connect MacArthur and Oakland Coliseum with the Transbay Tube directly have been proposed to create express service, reduce the systemwide effects of delays in the Wye, and potentially provide an infill station at Jack London Square. Other infill stations or more frequent service may be provided in urban core areas if a turnback is built in the Oakland Wye.
