= West Oakland station =

Rapid transit station in Oakland, California, US

West Oakland
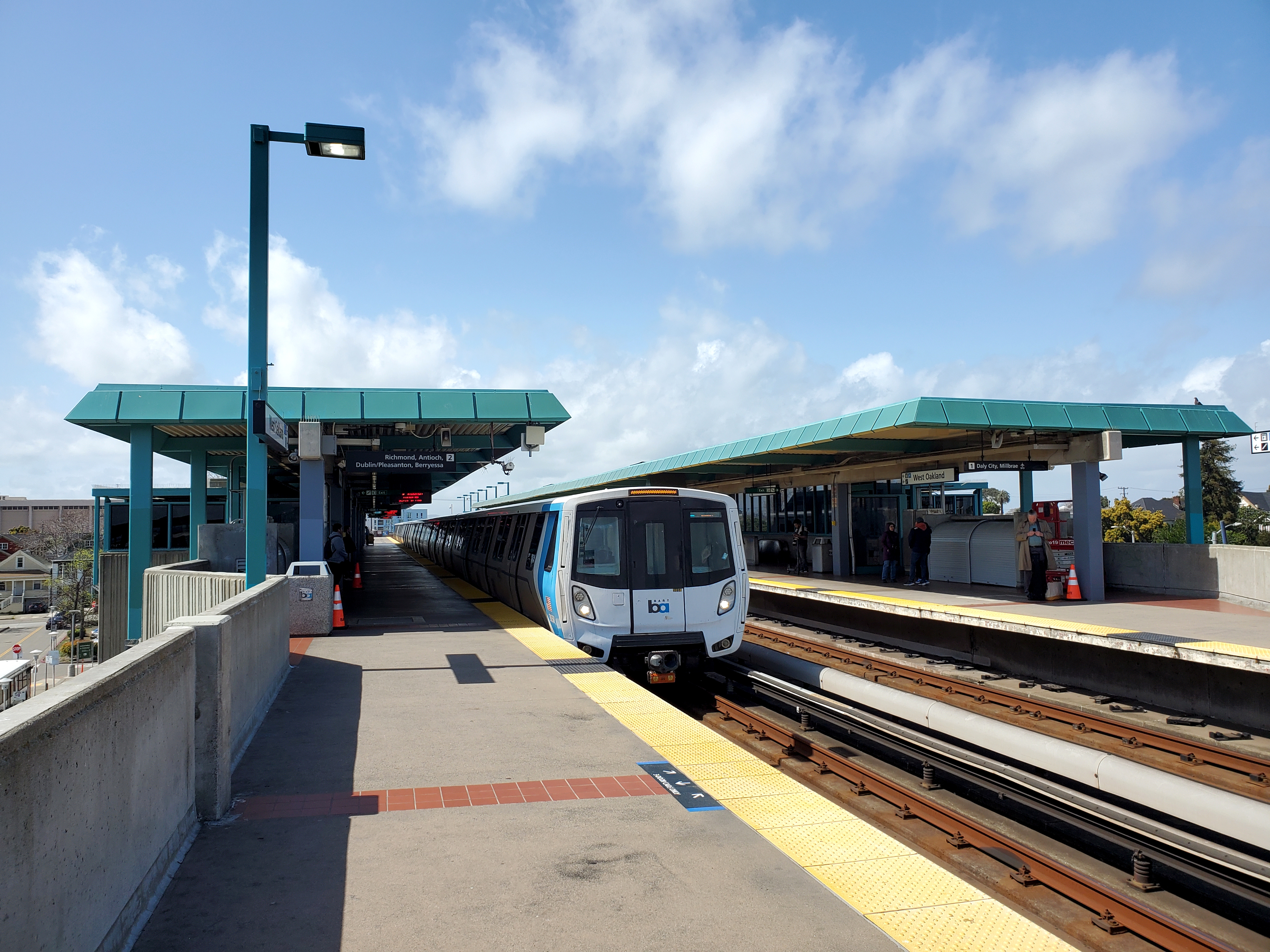
- A train at West Oakland station in March 2025

General information
- Location: 1451 7th Street; Oakland, California
- Coordinates: 37.8049°N 122.2951°W
- Line: BART M-Line
- Platforms: 2 side platforms
- Connections: AC Transit: 14, 22, 36, 62, 800; Flixbus, Greyhound

Construction
- Structure type: Elevated
- Parking: 156 spaces
- Cycle facilities: Racks, 42 shared lockers, 8 keyed reserved lockers, Bay Wheels station
- Accessible: Yes
- Architect: Kitchen & Hunt

Other information
- Station code: BART: WOAK

History
- Opened: September 16, 1974
- Former names: Oakland West (1974–1988)

Passengers
- 2025: 4,358 (weekday average)

Services
Preceding station	Bay Area Rapid Transit	Following station
Embarcadero toward Daly City	Blue Line	Lake Merritt toward Dublin/Pleasanton
Embarcadero toward Daly City	Green Line	Lake Merritt toward Berryessa
Embarcadero toward Millbrae	Red Line	12th Street Oakland City Center toward Richmond
Embarcadero toward SFO or Millbrae	Yellow Line	12th Street Oakland City Center toward Antioch via Pittsburg/Bay Point
Location

West Oakland station is a Bay Area Rapid Transit (BART) station in the West Oakland neighborhood of Oakland, California. It has two elevated side platforms and is located near the eastern end of the Transbay Tube. All main BART lines except the Orange Line stop at the station. The Oakland Wye is located to the east of the station.

== Station layout ==
The station is located in the block bounded by Chester Street, 7th Street, Mandela Parkway, and 5th Street. The elevated BART tracks run roughly east-west through the station. Two side platforms flank the tracks. The street-level fare lobby is located near the center of the platform. Two staircases, one escalator, and one elevator connect each platform to the lobby. Bus stops on 7th Street and Mandela Parkway served AC Transit bus routes 14, 22, 36, and 62, as well as Flixbus and Greyhound intercity bus service.

== History ==
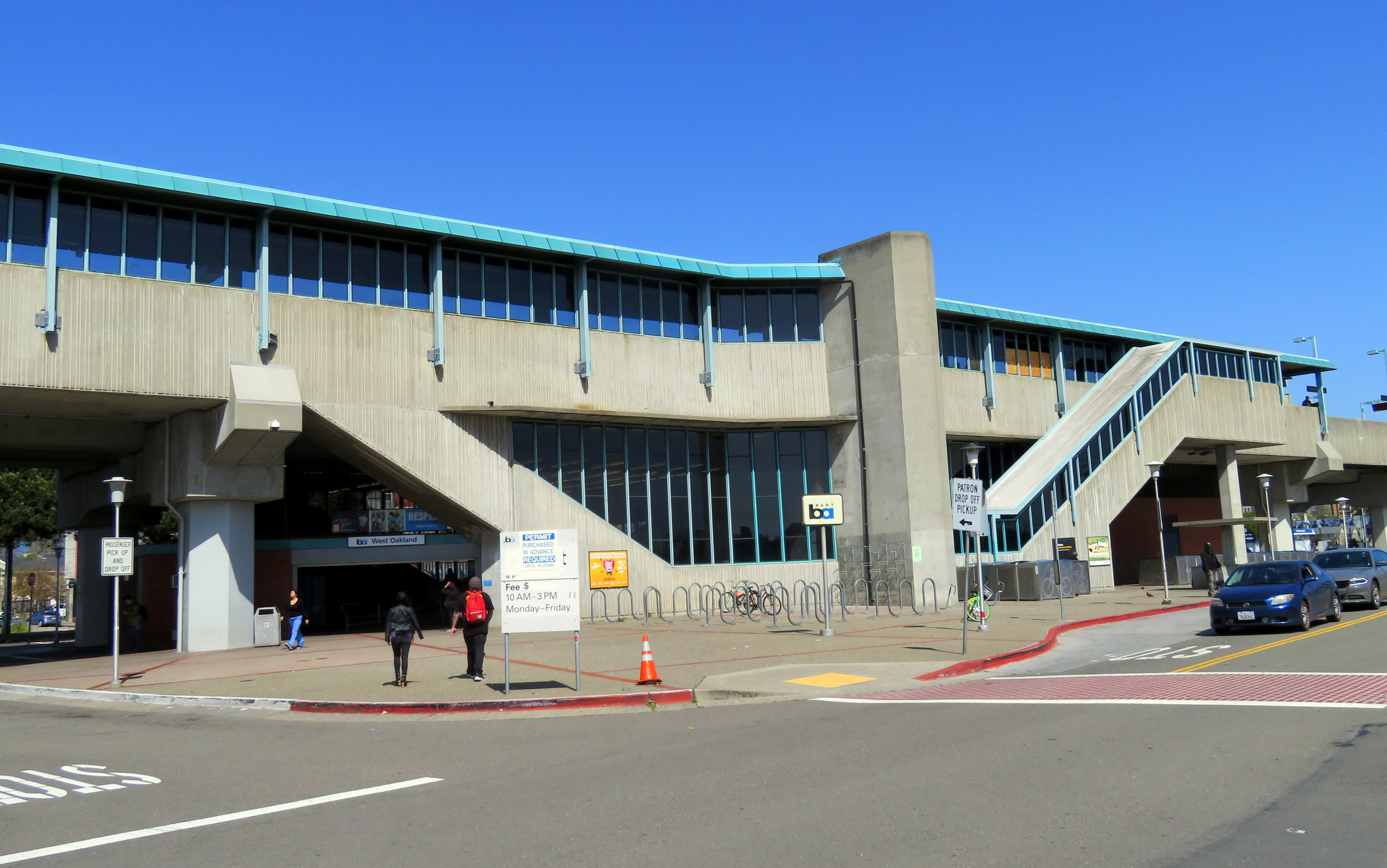
West Oakland station in 2018

By August 1965, the city of Oakland desired to call the planned station Oakland West. BART approved the name that December. The station opened on September 16, 1974 – the last station of the initial BART system to open – with the beginning of service through the Transbay Tube. The name "Oakland West" was contrary to the actual neighborhood name of "West Oakland". The efforts of neighborhood activists led BART to correct the name to West Oakland in May 1988.

In 1990, West Oakland was proposed as a station for the Capitols service to replace the damaged 16th Street station. It was again proposed in 1992 as an intermodal station including Amtrak and buses as part of the replacement of the Cypress Street Viaduct. Seismic retrofitting of the station took place in 2009–2011. West Oakland was the first BART station to be retrofitted with new fare gates intended to reduce fare evasion. Installation of the new gates took place from December 11–28, 2023.

=== Development ===
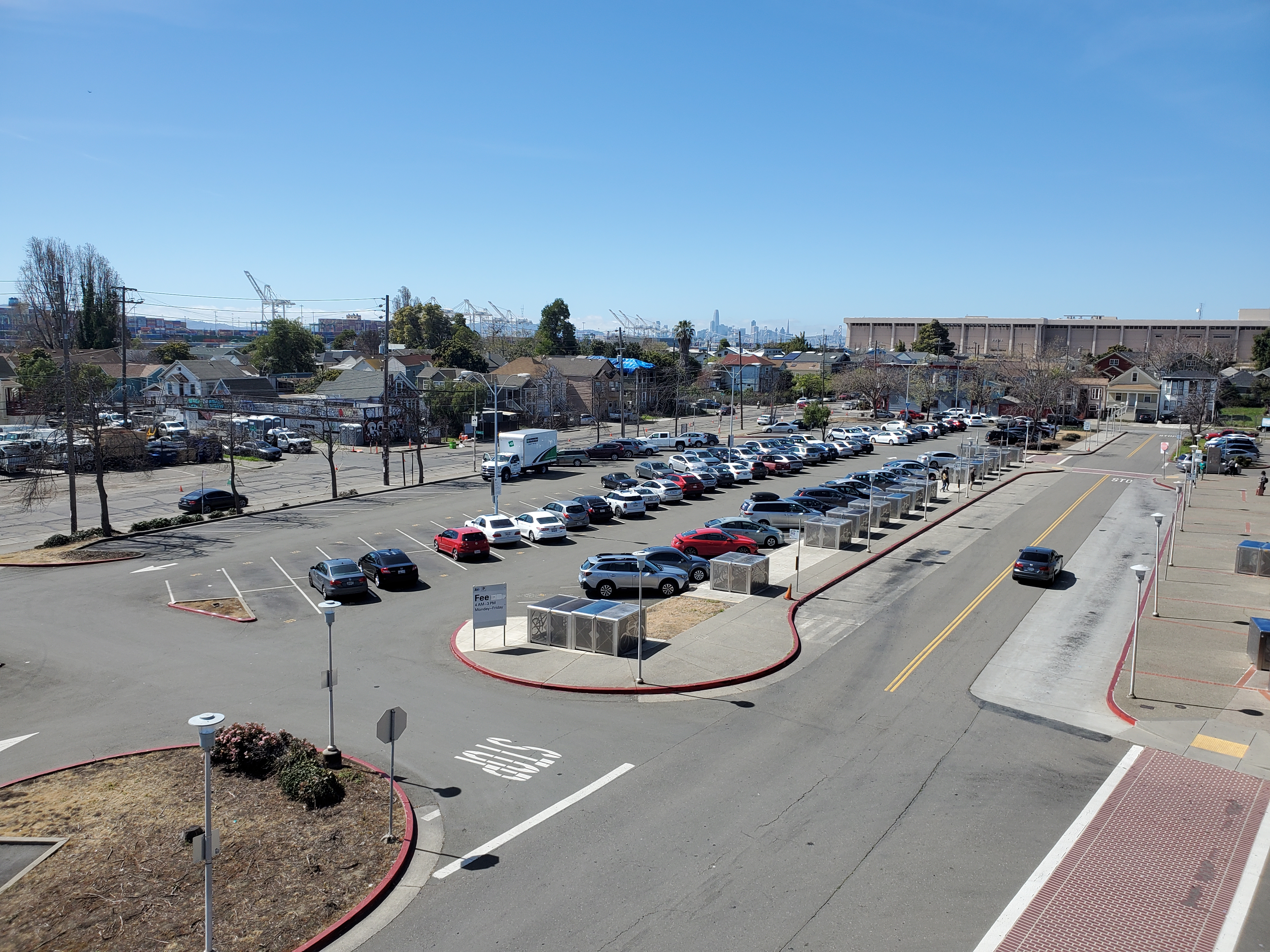
The south parking lot in 2024 prior to development

In December 2013, BART issued a request for qualifications for a developer to construct transit-oriented development (TOD) to replace parking lots surrounding the station. The agency began negotiations with a developer in 2014. In February 2019, the city approved plans for a three-building development The BART Board of Directors approved the plans in June 2020. A revised version was approved by the city in November 2020.

The development is to be mixed-use with 762 housing units, 53,478 square feet (4,968.3 m^{2}) of retail, and 300,000 square feet (28,000 m^{2}) of office space. Three parking garages will have 385 parking spaces. After several years of delay, a $47 million state grant awarded in December 2025 allowed the developers to move forward with the project. Construction began on September 14, 2026. About 240 of the station's 440 surface parking spots were closed, as was the busway on the south side of the station.

As of 2024, BART indicates "significant market, local support, and/or implementation barriers" that must be overcome to allow TOD on a separate parcel isolated from the main development. That second phase would not begin until at least the mid-2030s. A nearby development was planned at 500 Kirkham Street; the private developer lost the property in foreclosure in October 2023.
