= Richmond Line =

Richmond Line refers to the following transit lines:

- Red Line and Orange Line, part of the Bay Area Rapid Transit system in California, United States
- Richmond Line (Staten Island), a former streetcar line in New York, United States
- Richmond railway line in Sydney, Australia
