= 12th Street Oakland City Center station =

Rapid transit station in Oakland, California, US

12th St/Oakland
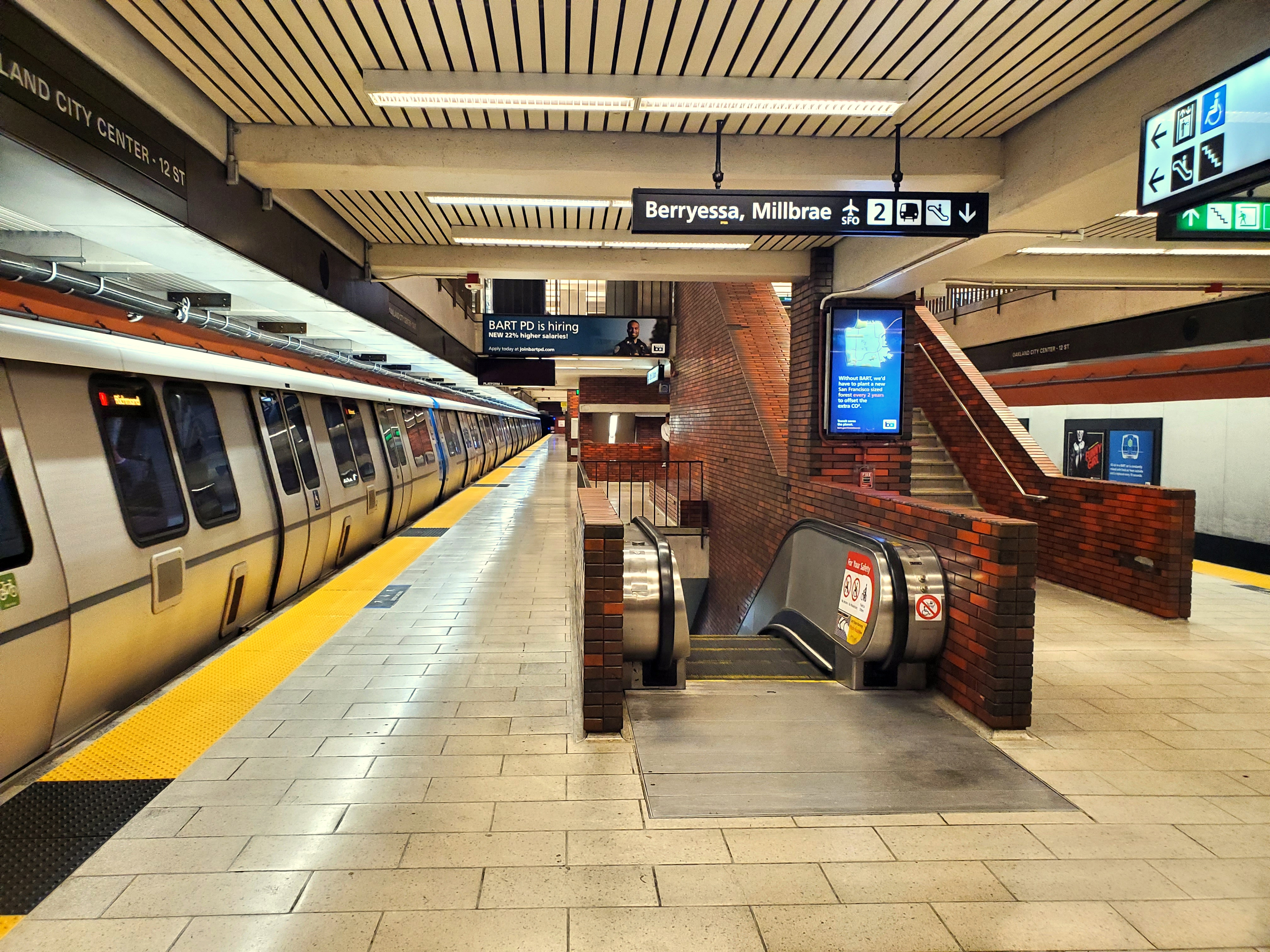
- A Richmond-bound Red Line train at the station in 2024

General information
- Location: 1245 Broadway; Oakland, California
- Coordinates: 37.803608°N 122.272006°W
- Line: BART K-Line
- Platforms: 1 side platform, 1 island platform
- Tracks: 3
- Connections: AC Transit: Tempo, 6, 12, 14, 18, 19, 22, 30, 40, 51A, 72, 72L, 72M, 88, 96, 611, 800, 801, 802, 805, 840, 851

Construction
- Structure type: Underground
- Cycle facilities: Lockers and racks available
- Accessible: Yes
- Architect: Gerald McCue & Associates

Other information
- Station code: BART: 12TH

History
- Opened: September 11, 1972
- Rebuilt: 1980–1986
- Former names: Oakland City Center/12th Street (until c. 2008)

Passengers
- 2025: 5,569 (weekday average)

Services
Preceding station	Bay Area Rapid Transit	Following station
Lake Merritt toward Berryessa	Orange Line	19th Street Oakland toward Richmond
West Oakland toward Millbrae	Red Line	19th Street Oakland toward Richmond
West Oakland toward SFO or Millbrae	Yellow Line	19th Street Oakland toward Antioch via Pittsburg/Bay Point
Preceding station	AC Transit	Following station
Uptown Transit Center Terminus	Tempo	Harrison toward San Leandro BART
Location

12th Street/Oakland City Center station (signed as 12th St/Oakland) is an underground Bay Area Rapid Transit (BART) station located under Broadway between 12th Street and 14th Street in Downtown Oakland, adjacent to the Oakland City Center. The station has three underground levels, with tracks on the second and third levels. It is served by the Red Line, Orange Line, and Yellow Line, as well as by AC Transit buses on the surface.

Oakland City Center/12th Street station opened in 1972 as part of the first section of BART. In 1980–1986, the KE Track project added the third track to the station. From 1992 to 2002, and 2004 to 2010, it was the timed transfer point between northbound trains. Tempo bus rapid transit service began in 2020.

== Station layout ==
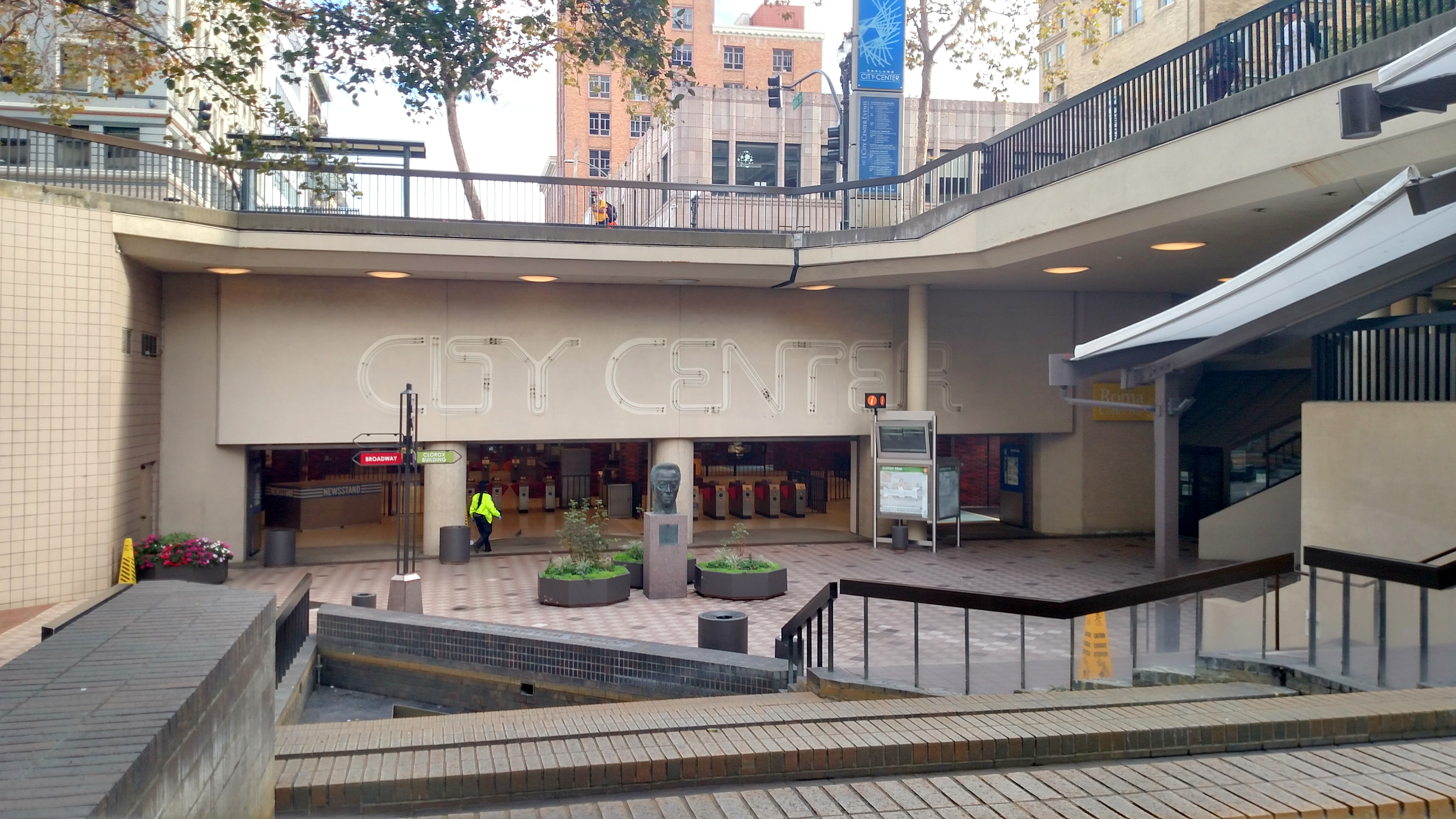
The Oakland City Center entrance to the station

The station has three underground levels. The first level is a concourse with ticket machines and faregates. An island platform and two main tracks (C1 and CX) for northbound trains (bound for Richmond and Antioch) are on the second level. A side platform with one track (C2) for southbound trains (bound for Berryessa or San Francisco) is on the third level. The station has red brickwork, contrasting with the blue of nearby 19th Street Oakland station.

The station has eight public entrances: two at 12th Street, three at 13th Street, and two at 14th Street (including one from Frank H. Ogawa Plaza), plus one from the belowground plaza of Oakland City Center near 13th Street. Surface elevators are located at the Ogawa Plaza entrance and at the southwest 12th Street entrance, while the platform elevator is at the south end of the station. A currently unused passage leads directly to the Central Building at the north end of the station.

=== Bus connections ===
Downtown Oakland is a major transfer point for AC Transit buses, which stop at various locations on Broadway and cross streets near the station:

- Local: 6, 12, 14, 18, 19, 22, 30, 40, 51A, 72, 72L, 72M, 88, 96
- All-Nighter: 800, 802, 805, 840, 851

Route 1T stops at dedicated platforms at two locations: 14th Street on Broadway at the north end of the station, and City Center just east of Broadway on 12th Street (northbound) and 11th Street (southbound) at the south end of the station.

== History ==
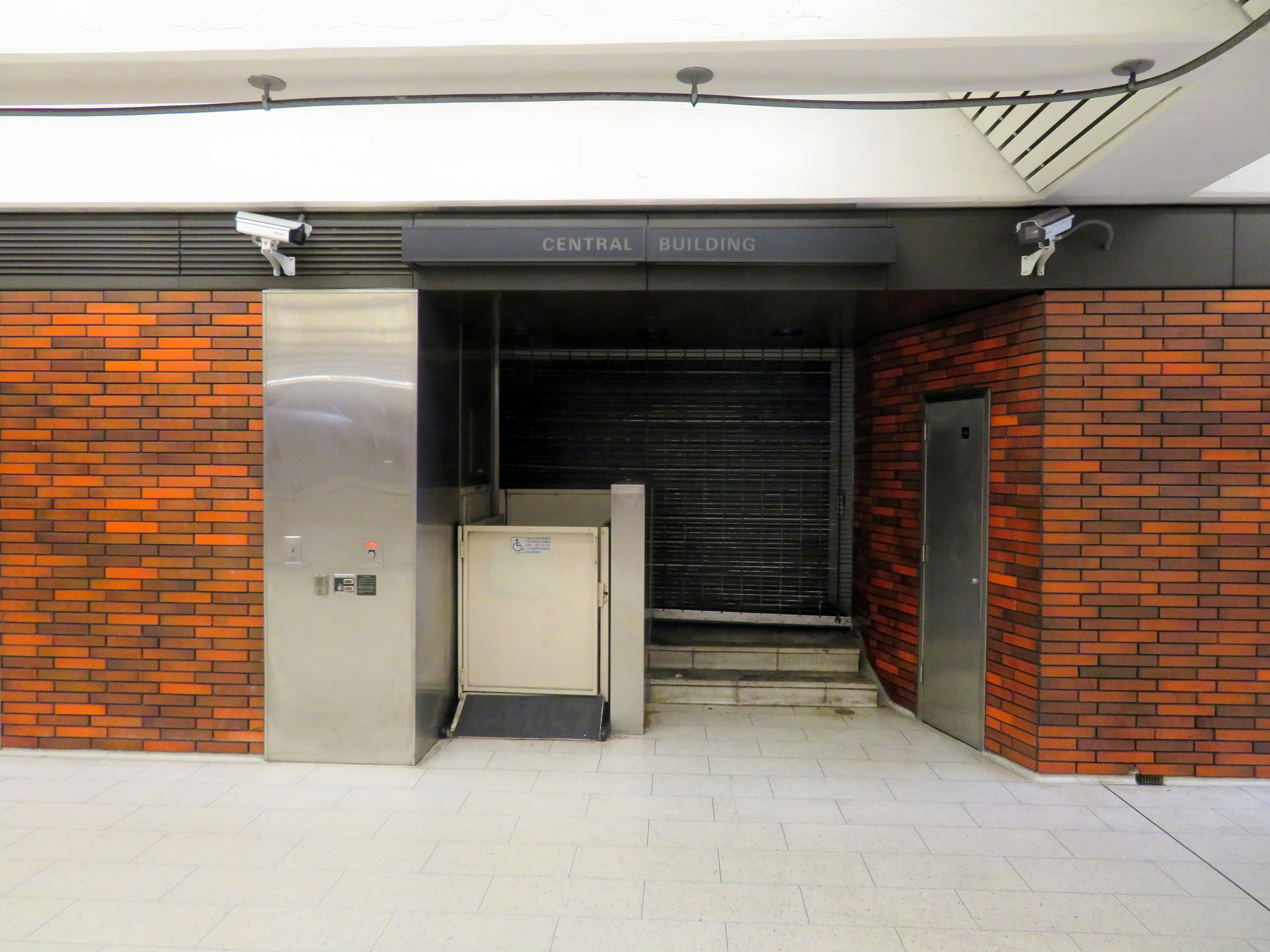
The disused Central Building entrance/exit

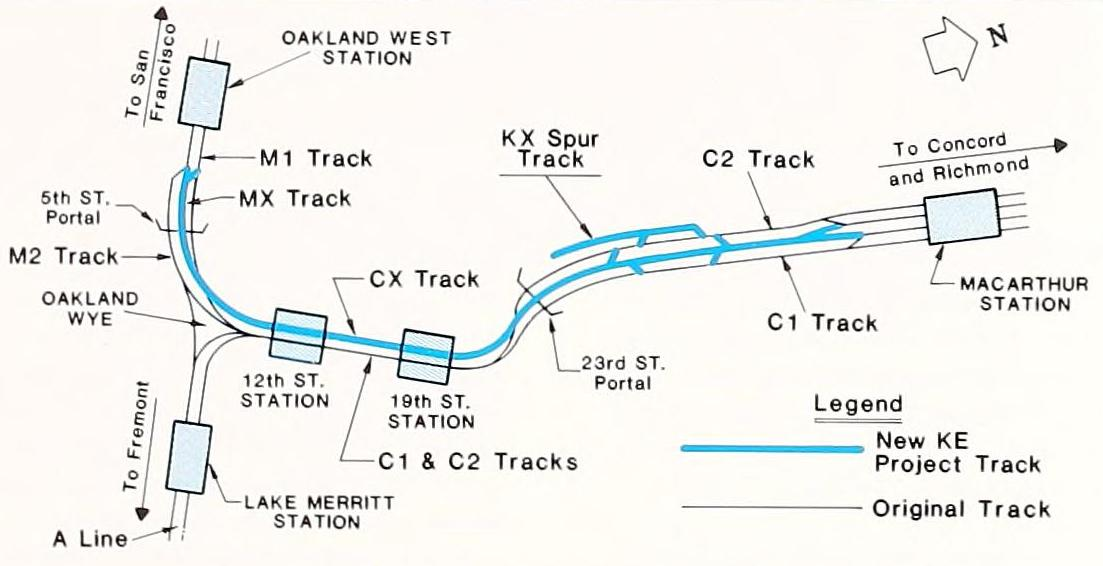
Map of the KE Track project

The station, along with 19th Street Oakland and Daly City stations, was designed by Gerard McCue and Associates. By 1967, owners of three Oakland buildings were considering paying for private entrances from the station mezzanine. Only one was actually constructed: an entrance from the Central Building (1400 Broadway) was approved in February 1968.

By August 1965, the city wanted to called the station "Oakland Downtown South", while BART preferred "Oakland-12". In October 1965, a BART committee recommended "12th Street". The BART Board approved 12th Street Oakland as the name that December. In October 1971, after pressure from Oakland officials to include mention of the new Oakland City Center development, the name was changed to Oakland City Center/12th Street. The station opened on September 11, 1972, as part of the first section of BART to open; service was extended to Richmond the next year. Service to Concord was added on May 21, 1973, and extended to San Francisco through the Transbay Tube on September 16, 1974. Richmond–San Francisco service was added on April 19, 1976.

The station was initially built without an elevator between the mezzanine and street level because the city of Oakland refused to allow elevator kiosks on the sidewalks. By late 1973, it was the only BART station without an elevator completed or under construction. A surface elevator near 11th Street, set back from the sidewalk on a parcel being redevelopment, was ultimately built as part of a $1.47 million modification to the station. Constructed as part of the City Center development, it also included additional escalators and a new entrance from the City Center plaza. The United States Department of Transportation awarded $1.17 million for the project in April 1974, and a construction contract was issued that December. The elevator and new entrance opened along with the plaza and the Clorox Building on October 15, 1976. A second elevator was added in Ogawa Plaza in 2002.

The station initially had one side platform on each level, with one track on the east side of each platform. The KE Track project, begun in 1980 and completed on March 17, 1986, converted the upper platform to an island platform with a new west track (Track CX). The new track was originally used for peak hour service (southbound towards San Francisco in the morning, and northbound in the evening). Schedule changes on June 22, 1992, introduced timed transfers between Richmond–Fremont line and Concord–Daly City line trains. Oakland City Center/12th Street was the transfer point between northbound (Richmond-bound and Concord-bound) trains, while MacArthur station was the transfer point between southbound trains. The CX Track became northbound-only at this time. Timed transfers were discontinued in 2002, but resumed on February 9, 2004.

The station was renamed to 12th Street Oakland City Center around 2008. On September 13, 2010, the northbound transfer location was changed to 19th Street Oakland station. Sunday-only service to the station on the Dublin/Pleasanton line was operated from February 11, 2019, to February 10, 2020, due to construction work in the Transbay Tube. Four of the six entrances were closed from April 13, 2020, to June 12, 2021, due to low ridership during the COVID-19 pandemic. Construction of the Oakland–San Leandro East Bay Bus Rapid Transit line (later branded Tempo) began in August 2016. Tempo route 1T service began on August 9, 2020, with surface stations at 14th Street and City Center. Installation of second-generation faregates at the BART station took place in December 2024.
