= MacArthur station =

MacArthur Station may refer to:

- MacArthur station (BART), Oakland, California, United States
- Macarthur railway station, Campbelltown, New South Wales, Australia
