= Tempo (bus rapid transit) =

Bus rapid transit in Oakland and San Leandro, California

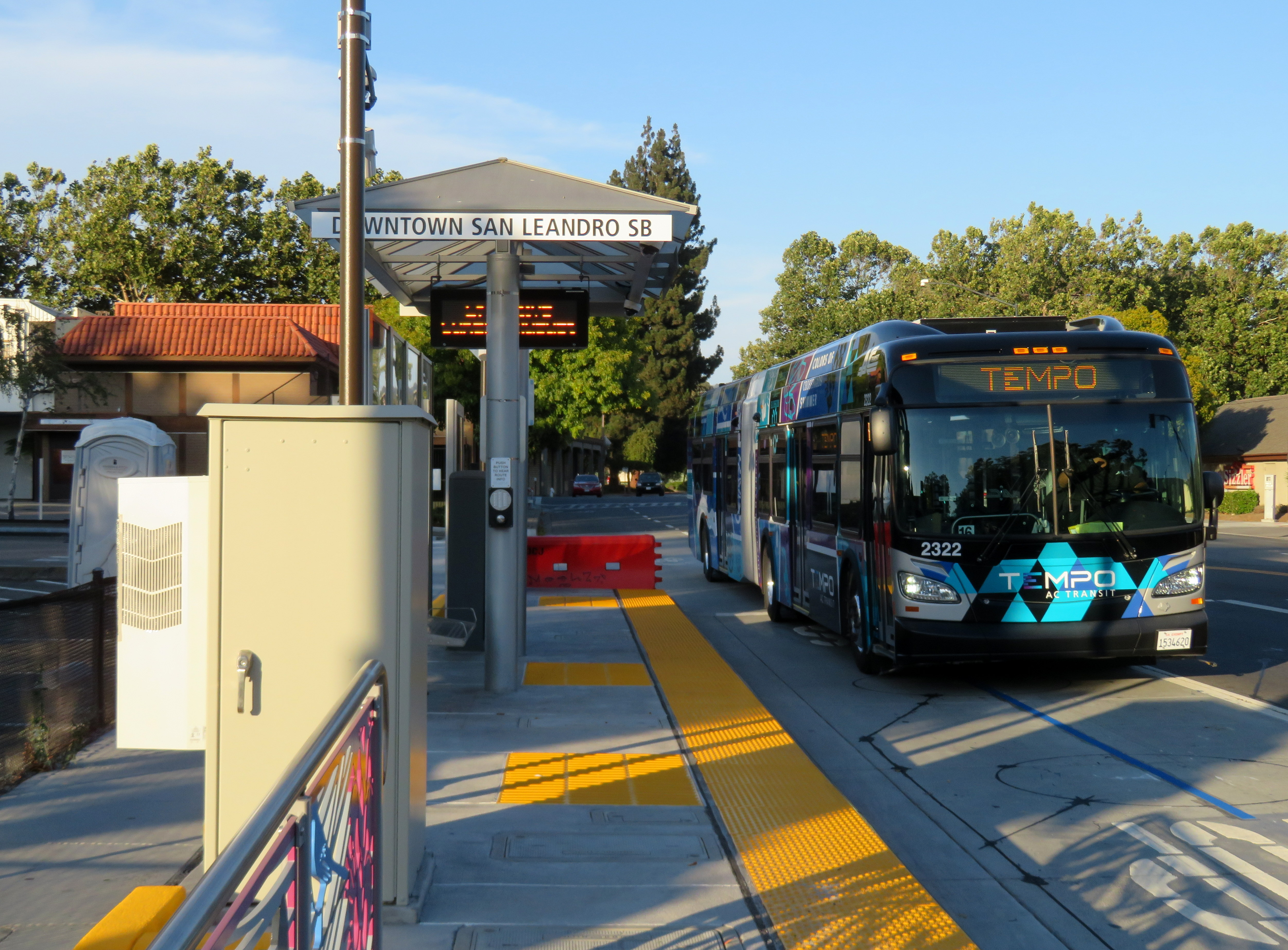
- A southbound bus at Downtown San Leandro station

Overview
- Operator: AC Transit
- Garage: Division 4
- Vehicle: 27 New Flyer XDE60
- Began service: August 9, 2020
- Predecessors: 1, 1R

Route
- Locale: Oakland, San Leandro
- Start: Uptown Transit Center
- Via: International Boulevard
- End: San Leandro BART station
- Length: 9.5 mi (15.3 km)
- Stations: 34

Service
- Frequency: 10 min (6 am–7 pm); 15 min (7 pm–midnight); 30–60 min (midnight–6 am)
- Journey time: 40–47 min
- Daily ridership: 17,142 (Weekday, Feb 2026)
- Ridership: 4,836,169 (FY 2024-25)
- Timetable: AC Transit Tempo
- Map: AC Transit Tempo
Route map
Tempo highlighted in purple
List of AC Transit routes	6 →

Tempo is a bus rapid transit (BRT) service in Oakland and San Leandro in California. It is operated by AC Transit as Line 1T. The route has dedicated lanes and center-boarding stations along much of the corridor, prepaid fares, signal preemption, and all-door boarding. It is AC Transit's busiest bus route, with an average of 17,142 riders each weekday in February 2026.

== Route ==
The northern terminus of the line is at the Uptown Transit Center, located at the 19th Street/Oakland BART station. The lines continues down Broadway in mixed traffic, passing 12th Street/Oakland City Center BART station before the southbound and northbound routes split at 11th and 12th Streets, respectively. Both directions simultaneously meet at and run on Lake Merritt Boulevard before splitting again to 12th Street and International Boulevard. Southbound buses join International Boulevard at 14th Avenue and begin median running in an exclusive bus lane. Services continue to a station near Fruitvale BART and onward to San Leandro, where operation in mixed traffic resumes and the line continues down Davis Street to terminate at San Leandro BART.

Articulated buses call at specially built high-curbed bus stops at the north and south ends of the line while the majority of International Boulevard stops feature median strip boarding platforms.

== History ==
=== Planning ===
A 1993 AC Transit study designed the Berkeley–Oakland–San Leandro corridor as a potential alignment for major transit investment. The agency began work on a Major Investment Study (MIS) for the corridor in 1999. Telegraph Avenue was selected as the Berkeley–Oakland alignment in 2011; Shattuck Avenue had lower expected ridership, while College Avenue had fewer opportunities for transit-oriented development. The 2002-released MIS recommended bus rapid transit (BRT) for the corridor; light rail was deemed not to be cost-effective, while enhancements to conventional bus service would not generate significant ridership increases.

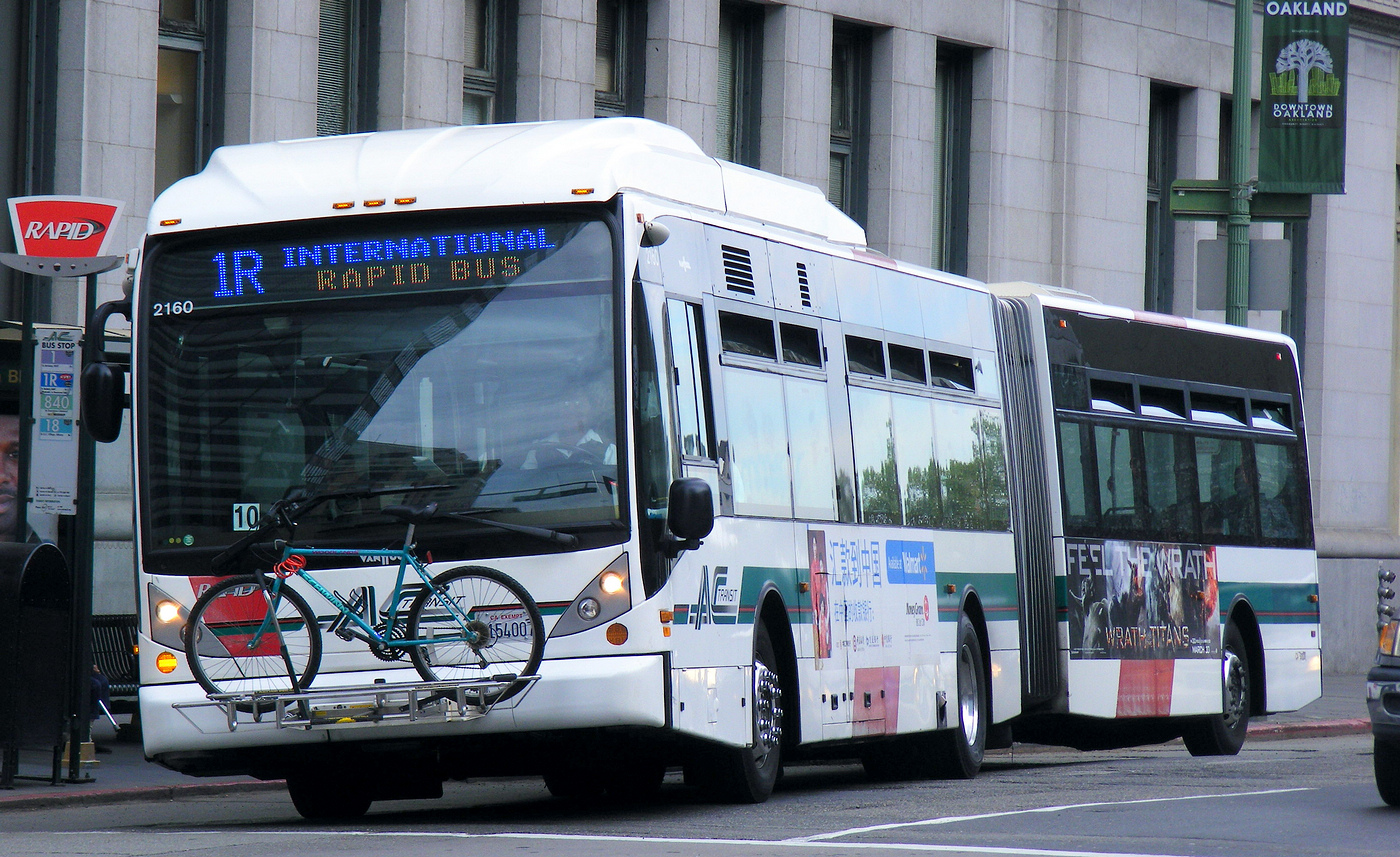
A route 1R bus in Oakland in 2012

Prior to 2007, Telegraph Avenue was primarily served by the 40/40L local/limited-stop routes, while International Boulevard and East 14th Street were served by the 82/82L pair. Service changes on June 24, 2007, included the establishment of Berkeley–Downtown Oakland–Bay Fair routes 1R and 1; the 82/82L were discontinued and the 40/40L were cut back to no longer serve Telegraph Avenue. Route 1R (the International Rapid) operated as a limited-stop overlay of local route 1; it had some bus rapid transit features like transit signal priority and wide stop spacing, but not all-door boarding or dedicated lanes. It was intended as a first phase while the full BRT service was planned.

The 2007 Draft Environmental Impact Statement/Environmental Impact Report considered whether to have Bay Fair or San Leandro as the southern terminus, and whether to have separate local and express services or a single combined service. AC Transit later selected a combined service to San Leandro station as the Locally Preferred Alternative. In April 2010, the Berkeley City Council voted against the inclusion of center bus lanes over concerns about reducing Telegraph Avenue to a single general traffic lane in each direction. The city's preferred alternative, with curbside stops and no dedicated bus lanes, was not compatible with BRT service standards. Berkeley withdrew from the project in 2011. San Leandro also objected to center lanes on its portion of the line.

The Final Environmental Impact Statement/Final Environmental Impact Report, released in January 2012, removed the center lanes south of Georgia Way in San Leandro. It also included a Downtown Oakland–San Leandro alternative to allow the project to proceed without the Berkeley and North Oakland section. AC Transit approved this shorter alternative in April 2012, followed by the Oakland and San Leandro city councils that July. (That June, the center lanes had been further cut to Broadmoor Street near the Oakland/San Leandro border by the San Leandro city council.)

=== Construction and service ===
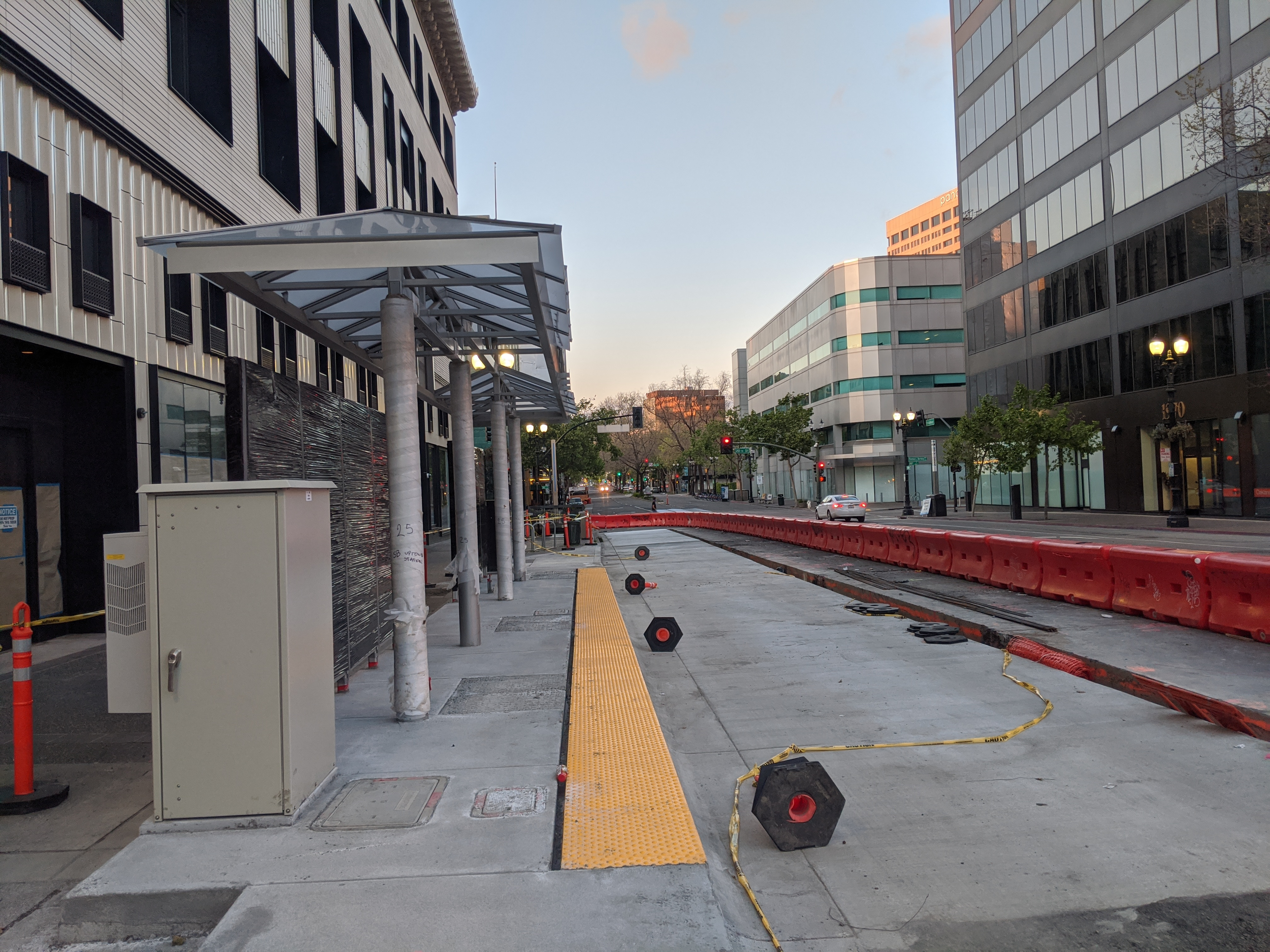
The southbound BRT platform at 19th Street under construction in April 2020

Route 1R was eliminated on June 26, 2016 to allow for construction. Route 1 was changed to run only between Downtown Oakland and San Leandro station; new routes 6 and 10 were created to serve the Downtown Oakland–Berkeley and San Leandro–Bay Fair segments. Groundbreaking was held in August 2016. The project was funded by a mix of local, state, and federal funds; major sources included Federal Transit Administration Small Starts (31%), Regional Measure 2 bridge tolls (24%), AC Transit (10%), and Alameda County Measure B/Measure BB sales tax (9.2%).

The service was branded Tempo in July 2020, with the service numbered 1T. Route 1T service began on August 9, 2020, with local route 1 eliminated. Tempo was fare-free for the first 90 days of service; fare collection started on November 9, 2020. The total cost of the project was $232 million.

On March 31, 2023, overnight service was curtailed to City Center (northbound) and 14th Street (southbound) due to street closures in downtown Oakland. On August 6 of the same year, late-night trips (after 9 pm) were also truncated in the same way. In 2024, a "quick build" project by AC Transit and the City of Oakland added delineator posts, pavement markings, and signage between 14th Avenue and 107th Avenue in response to safety concerns. Speed cushions to discourage motorists from illegally driving in the bus lanes were also planned.

A 2016 AC Transit study of potential improvements to major corridors proposed extensions of the Downtown Oakland–San Leandro corridor to Emeryville via West Grand Avenue, and to Bay Fair station via East 14th Street.

== Station list ==
Note: Bold indicates frequent bus route service.

north to south

Station	Platform	Intersection/ address	Connections	Notes
Uptown Oakland	curb (2)	Broadway and 17th Street (NB); Broadway and 20th Street (SB)	BART: AC Transit: **6**, 12, **18**, **51A**, **72/72L/72M**, 88, 633, 651, 800, 802, 805, 851, NL	Northern terminus Serves Uptown Oakland, BART Headquarters, Fox Oakland Theatre, Kaiser Center, Paramount Theatre
14th Street	curb (2)	Broadway and 14th Street	AC Transit: **6**, 12, 14, **18**, **51A**, **72/72L/72M**, 88, 633, 651, 800, 802, 805, 840, 851	Serves Downtown Oakland, Oakland City Hall, Frank Ogawa Plaza, AC Transit Headquarters
City Center	curb (2)	12th and Broadway (NB); 11th and Broadway (SB)	BART: AC Transit: **6**, 12, **18**, 19, 22, 30, **40**, **51A**, **72/72L/72M**, 88, 96, 633, 651, 800, 840, 851	Serves Downtown Oakland, Chinatown, Lafayette Square, Oakland City Center, Oakland Convention Center, Oakland Public Library Asian Branch
Harrison	curb (2)	12th and Webster Streets (NB); 11th and Alice Streets (SB)	AC Transit: 18, 19, 22, 30, **40**, 96, 633, 840	Serves Downtown Oakland, Chinatown
Madison	curb (2)	12th and Madison Streets (NB); 11th and Madison Streets (SB)	BART: (at Lake Merritt); AC Transit: 18, 22, **40**, 96, 633, 840	Serves Downtown Oakland, Lake Merritt, Laney College, MetWest High School, Oakland Main Library, Oakland Museum
2nd Avenue	curb (2)	International Boulevard and 2nd Avenue (NB); East 12th Street and 2nd Avenue (SB)		
5th Avenue	curb (2)	International Boulevard and 5th Avenue (NB); East 12th Street and 5th Avenue (SB)	AC Transit: 62	
10th Avenue	curb (2)	International Boulevard and 10th Avenue (NB); East 12th Street and 11th Avenue (SB)		
14th Avenue	curb (2)	International Boulevard and 14th Avenue (NB); 14th Avenue and Solano Way (SB)	AC Transit: 96	
20th Avenue	median	International Boulevard and 20th Avenue		Serves Community School for Creative Education
24th Avenue	median	International Boulevard and 24th Avenue	AC Transit: 62	
28th Avenue	median	International Boulevard and 28th Avenue		
31st Avenue	median	International Boulevard and 31st Avenue	AC Transit: 30, 31, 639	Serves Fruitvale
Fruitvale	median	International Boulevard and 34th Avenue	BART: (at Fruitvale); AC Transit: 54, 654, 655	Serves Fruitvale Village and Oakland Public Library Cesar E. Chavez Branch
39th Avenue	median	International Boulevard and 39th Avenue		Serves Fruitvale
High Street	median	International Boulevard and 45th Avenue	AC Transit: 14, 648	Serves Fremont High School and Oakland Public Library Melrose Branch
48th Avenue	median	International Boulevard and 48th Avenue		
54th Avenue	median	International Boulevard and 54th Avenue		
Seminary	median	International Boulevard and 58th Avenue	AC Transit: 45, 617, 650	
63rd Avenue	median	International Boulevard and 63rd Avenue		
67th Avenue	median	International Boulevard and 67th Avenue		Serves Oakland Public Library Martin Luther King Jr. Branch
73rd Avenue	median	International Boulevard and 72nd Avenue	AC Transit: 73, 638, 657, 805	
77th Avenue	median	International Boulevard and 77th Avenue		
82nd Avenue	median	International Boulevard and 82nd Avenue	AC Transit: 46L, 646	
86th Avenue	median	International Boulevard and 86th Avenue	AC Transit: 90	Serves Oakland Public Library Elmhurst Branch
90th Avenue	median	International Boulevard and 90th Avenue	AC Transit: 90, 652	
95th Avenue	median	International Boulevard and 95th Avenue		
98th Avenue	median	International Boulevard and 98th Avenue	AC Transit: 98	Serves Elmhurst United Middle School
103rd Avenue	median	International Boulevard and 103rd Avenue	AC Transit: 45	Easternmost stop in Oakland
Durant Avenue	median	East 14th Street and Durant Avenue		Serves Durant Marketplace; Westernmost stop in San Leandro
Georgia Way	curb (2)	East 14th Street and Euclid Avenue (NB); East 14th Street and Georgia Way (SB)		
San Leandro Civic Center	curb (2)	East 14th Street and Haas Avenue		Serves San Leandro City Hall
Downtown San Leandro	curb (2)	Davis and Hays Streets (NB); Davis Street and Dan Niemi Way (SB)	AC Transit: **9**, 34, 35, 801	Serves downtown San Leandro
San Leandro BART	island	1401 San Leandro Boulevard	BART: AC Transit: **9**, 28, 34, 35, 801; San Leandro LINKS	Southern terminus

== See also ==
- Oakland, San Leandro and Haywards Electric Railway
