= Red Line (BART) =

Rapid Transit line in the San Francisco Bay Area, California

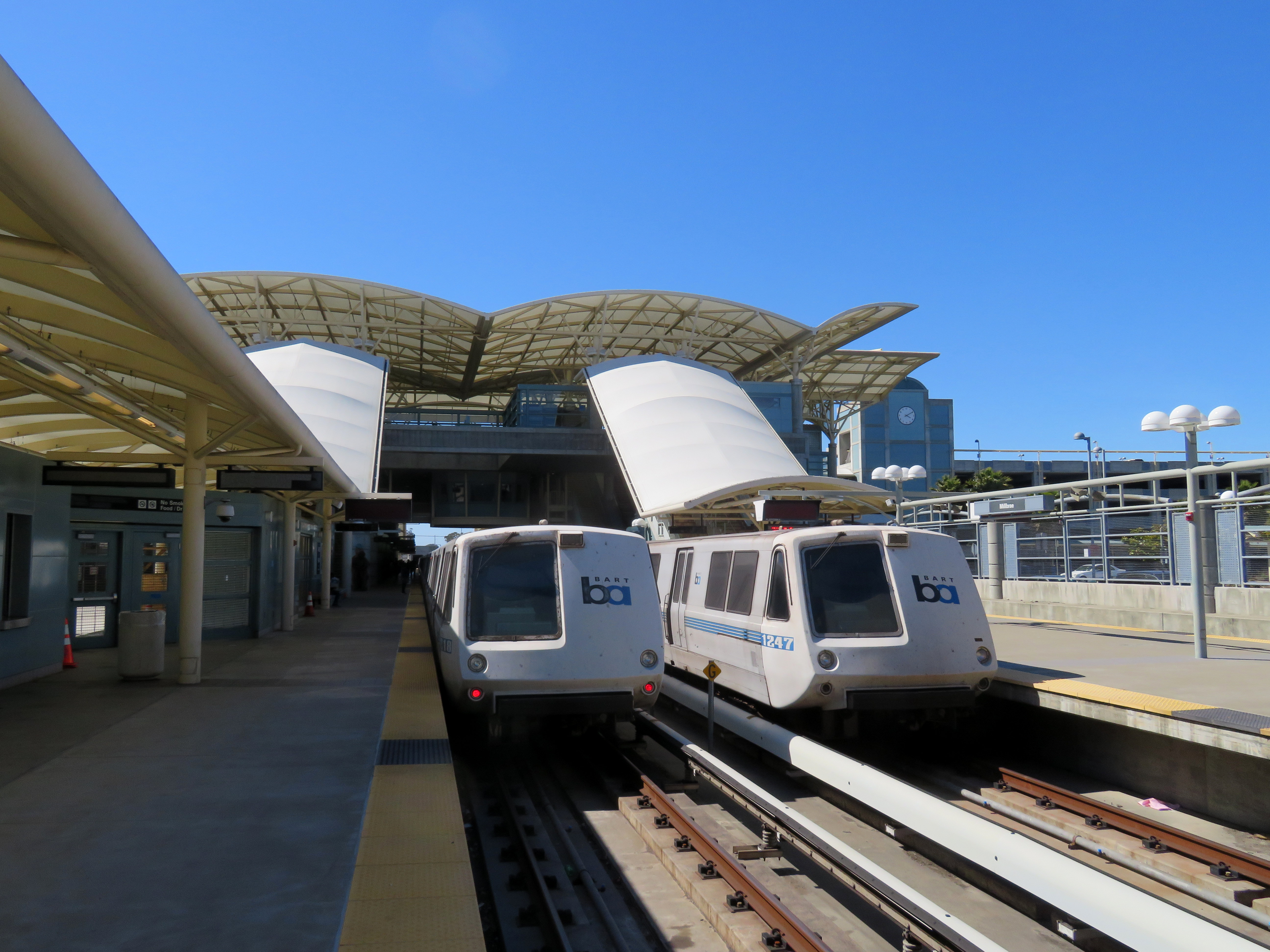
- Trains at Millbrae station in June 2018

Overview
- Other name: Richmond – Millbrae Line
- Owner: San Francisco Bay Area Rapid Transit District
- Locale: East Bay and San Francisco Peninsula
- Termini: Richmond; Millbrae
- Stations: 24

Service
- Type: Rapid transit
- System: Bay Area Rapid Transit

History
- Opened: April 19, 1976 (limited service); July 7, 1980 (all-day service)
- Last extension: February 9, 2004

Technical
- Line length: 38.2 mi (61.5 km)
- Track gauge: 5 ft 6 in (1,676 mm)
- Electrification: Third rail, 1 kV DC
- Operating speed: 70 mph (110 km/h)
- Signalling: Bombardier CITYFLO 550 fixed block ATC/ATO between San Bruno or Milbrae and SFO
Route map
Red Line highlighted in red

The Red Line is a Bay Area Rapid Transit (BART) line in the San Francisco Bay Area that runs between Richmond station and Millbrae station via San Francisco International Airport station. It has 24 stations in Richmond, El Cerrito, Berkeley, Oakland, San Francisco, Daly City, Colma, South San Francisco, San Bruno, and Millbrae. The line shares tracks with the four other mainline BART services.

As of February 14, 2022, the line runs until 9 pm every day. At other times, service along the route is provided by the Orange and Yellow Lines, with timed cross-platform transfers at 19th Street Oakland and MacArthur stations.

== Service history ==
The Red Line was the fourth of BART's five primary rapid transit lines to open. A few trains a day began running between Richmond and Daly City in April 1976, and all-day service began on July 7, 1980, after BART reduced train spacing through the Transbay Tube.

Citing increased ridership, BART extended weekday service on the line from 7pm to 8pm starting September 10, 2012. BART further extended service until 9pm on weekdays starting September 14, 2015.

=== SFO/Millbrae extension service ===
When the SFO/Millbrae extension opened on June 22, 2003, the Red Line continued to terminate at Daly City. BART extended the Red Line to San Francisco International Airport and Millbrae during weekday peak hours on February 9, 2004. San Mateo County is not a member of the San Francisco Bay Area Rapid Transit District, so SamTrans funded the county's BART service. When the extension's lower-than-expected ridership caused SamTrans to accrue deficits, BART agreed to SamTrans' request to operate only the Blue Line south of Daly City effective September 12, 2005.

SamTrans and BART reached an agreement in February 2007 in which SamTrans would transfer control and financial responsibility of the SFO/Millbrae extension to BART, in return for BART receiving additional fixed funding from SamTrans and other sources.

Beginning March 22, 2021, Red Line trains were interlined with the Purple Line, while Saturday service was discontinued. On August 2, 2021, the Red Line began operating on weekdays and Saturdays until 9 pm, with all trains extended to SFO. On February 20, 2022, the line began operating on all days until 9 pm. On some Sundays between February 20 and September 12, 2022, when power cable replacement work took place in San Francisco, the Yellow Line ran to Millbrae all day to replace the Red Line.

On March 6, 2022, a break in a power cable near Berkeley caused Red Line service to be temporarily discontinued. On March 8, a shuttle service began operating between SFO and Millbrae. Red Line service resumed with 5-car trains on March 22. Normal 10-car trains resumed service in early May. A similar cable break near Richmond on June 17, 2022, resulted in two days of cancelled Red Line service. Limited Red Line service resumed on June 20, with Orange Line service reduced and supplemental SFO–Millbrae shuttle service added.

Effective September 11, 2023, Red Line trains operate between Richmond and Millbrae via SFO.

Red Line's south-of-Daly City service
Date of change	Service pattern
June 22, 2003	none
February 9, 2004	Daly City–SFO/Millbrae (weekday peak hours); SFO station served only by northbound trains
September 13, 2004	Daly City–SFO/Millbrae (weekday peak hours)
September 12, 2005	none
January 1, 2008	Daly City–Millbrae (weekdays)
August 2, 2021	Daly City–SFO via Millbrae (weekdays and Saturdays)
February 14, 2022	Daly City–SFO via Millbrae
September 11, 2023	Daly City–Millbrae via SFO

== Stations ==
Station	Jurisdiction	County	Opened	Rail connections
Richmond	Richmond	Contra Costa	January 29, 1973	BART: Amtrak: Capitol Corridor, Gold Runner, California Zephyr
El Cerrito del Norte	El Cerrito	Contra Costa	January 29, 1973	BART:
El Cerrito Plaza	El Cerrito	Contra Costa	January 29, 1973	BART:
North Berkeley	Berkeley	Alameda	January 29, 1973	BART:
Downtown Berkeley	Berkeley	Alameda	January 29, 1973	BART:
Ashby	Berkeley	Alameda	January 29, 1973	BART:
MacArthur	Oakland	Alameda	September 11, 1972	BART:
19th Street Oakland	Oakland	Alameda	September 11, 1972	BART:
12th Street Oakland City Center	Oakland	Alameda	September 11, 1972	BART:
West Oakland	Oakland	Alameda	September 16, 1974	BART:
Embarcadero	San Francisco		May 27, 1976	BART: Muni: Cable Cars
Montgomery Street	San Francisco		November 5, 1973	BART: Muni:
Powell Street	San Francisco		November 5, 1973	BART: Muni: Cable Cars
Civic Center/UN Plaza	San Francisco		November 5, 1973	BART: Muni:
16th Street Mission	San Francisco		November 5, 1973	BART:
24th Street Mission	San Francisco		November 5, 1973	BART:
Glen Park	San Francisco		November 5, 1973	BART: Muni:
Balboa Park	San Francisco		November 5, 1973	BART: Muni:
Daly City	Daly City	San Mateo	November 5, 1973	BART:
Colma	Colma	San Mateo	February 24, 1996	BART:
South San Francisco	South San Francisco	San Mateo	June 22, 2003	BART:
San Bruno	San Bruno	San Mateo	June 22, 2003	BART:
San Francisco International Airport	SFO	San Mateo	June 22, 2003	BART: AirTrain to SFO
Millbrae	Millbrae	San Mateo	June 22, 2003	BART: Caltrain
