= 19th Street Oakland station =

Metro station in Oakland, California, US

19th St/Oakland
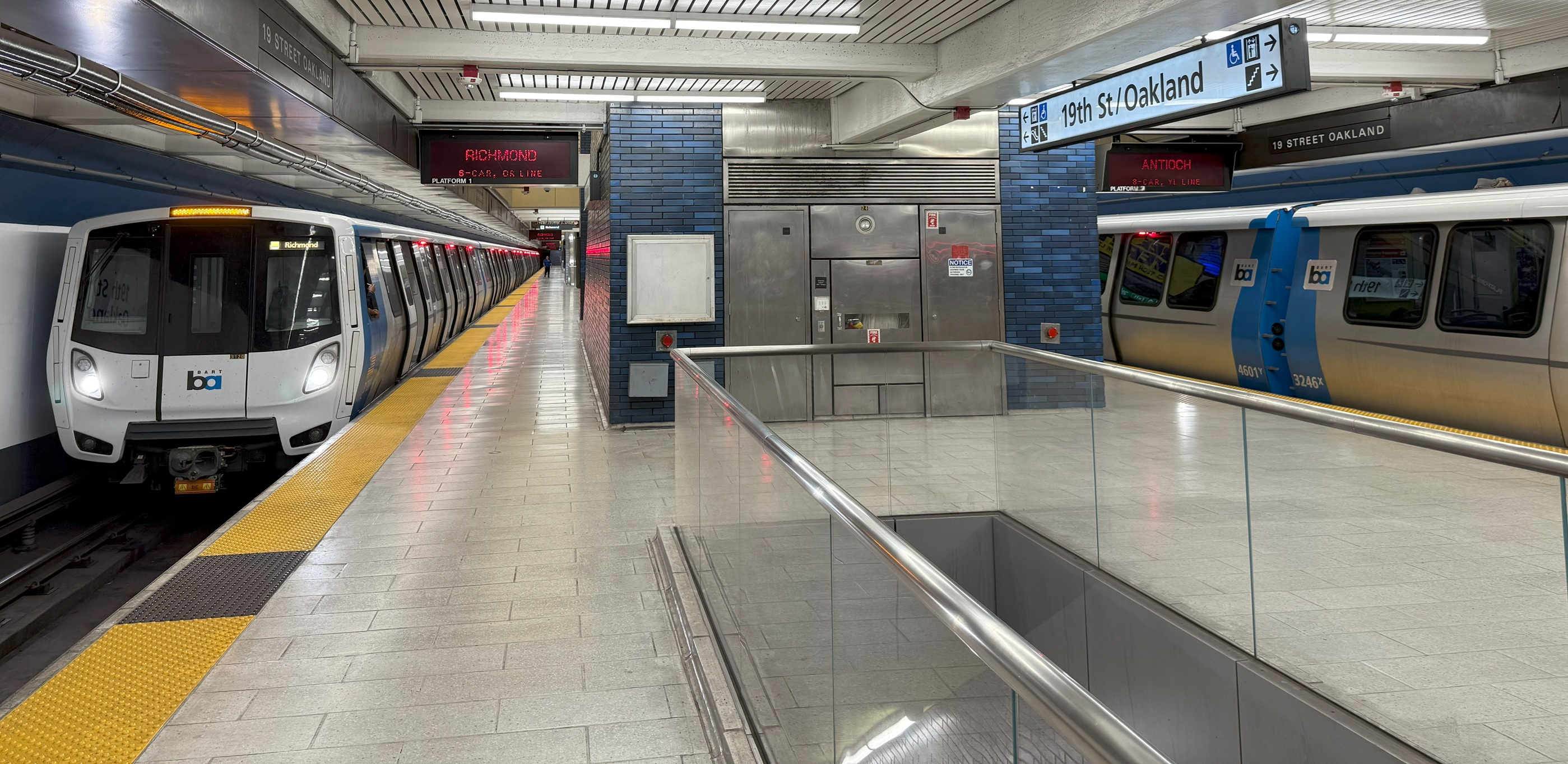
- Northbound Orange Line and Yellow Line trains at the upper platform in 2025

General information
- Location: 1900 Broadway; Oakland, California
- Coordinates: 37.8079°N 122.2690°W
- Line: BART K-Line
- Platforms: 1 island platform (upper level); 1 side platform (lower level)
- Tracks: 3 (2 on upper level, 1 on lower level)
- Connections: AC Transit: NL, Tempo, 6, 12, 18, 51A, 72, 72L, 72M, 88 800, 802, 805, 851

Construction
- Structure type: Underground
- Cycle facilities: Racks, bike station, lockers
- Accessible: Yes
- Architect: Gerald McCue & Associates

Other information
- Station code: BART: 19TH

History
- Opened: September 11, 1972
- Rebuilt: 1980–1986, 2019

Passengers
- 2025: 5,513 (weekday average)

Services
Preceding station	Bay Area Rapid Transit	Following station
12th Street Oakland City Center toward Berryessa	Orange Line	MacArthur toward Richmond
12th Street Oakland City Center toward Millbrae	Red Line	MacArthur toward Richmond
12th Street Oakland City Center toward SFO or Millbrae	Yellow Line	MacArthur toward Antioch via Pittsburg/Bay Point
Preceding station	AC Transit	Following station
14th Street toward San Leandro BART	Tempo	Terminus
Location

19th Street Oakland station (signed as 19th St/Oakland) is an underground Bay Area Rapid Transit (BART) station located under Broadway between 17th Street and 20th Street in the Uptown District of Oakland, California. It is a timed transfer point between northbound trains to Richmond and to Antioch. The station has three underground levels, with tracks on the second and third levels. It is served by the Red Line, Orange Line, and Yellow Line, as well as by AC Transit buses on the surface at the Uptown Transit Center.

The station opened in 1972 as part of the first section of BART. In 1980–1986, the KE Track project added the third track to the station. Changes during the 2010s included public art at one entrance, a new canopy at another entrance, and opening of a bike station. A 2019–2023 modernization project included a new elevator and reopened public restrooms. Tempo bus rapid transit service began in 2020.

== Station layout ==
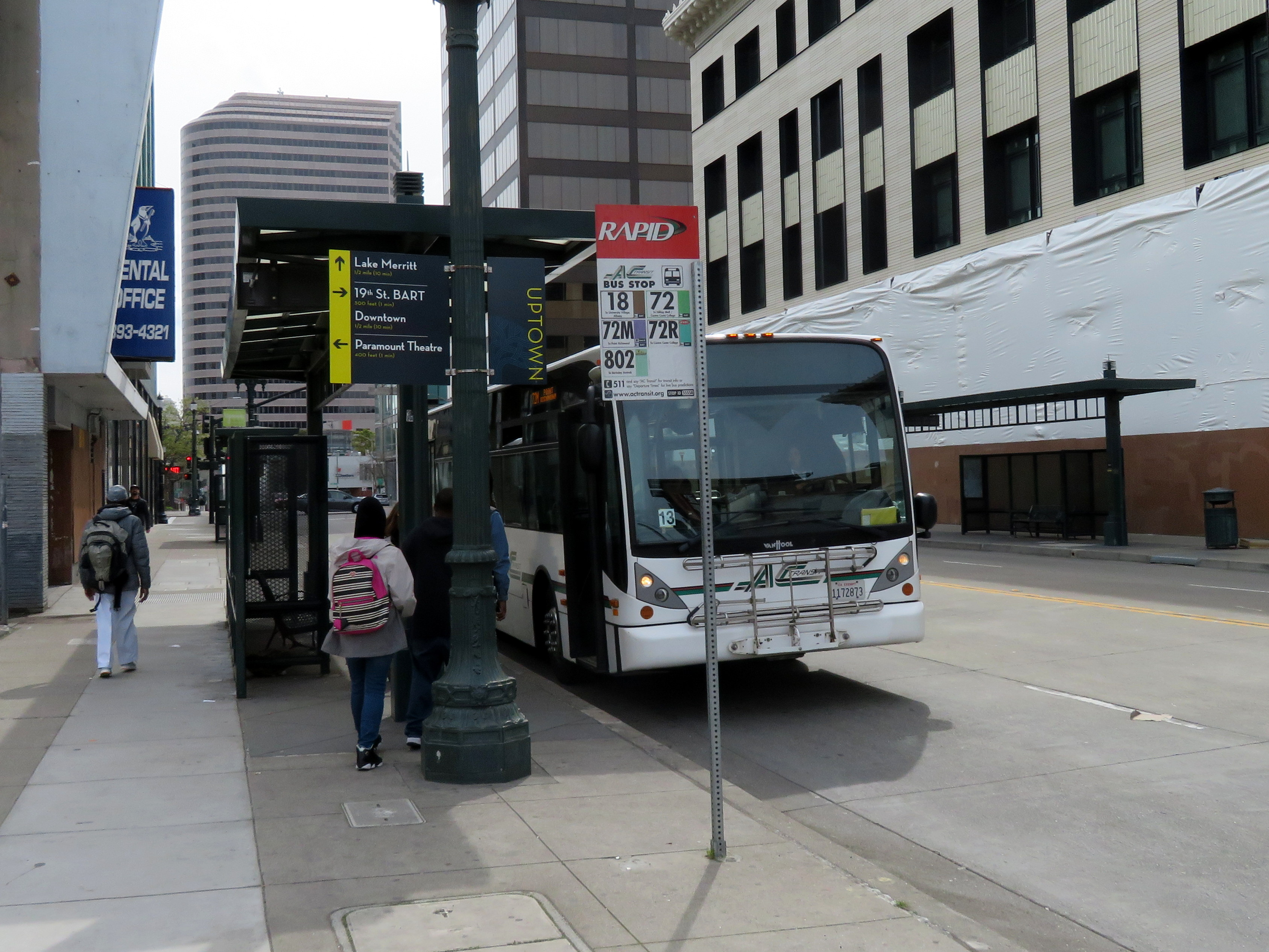
AC Transit bus at Uptown Transit Center

The station has three underground levels. The first level is a concourse with ticket machines and faregates. An island platform and two main tracks (C1 and CX) for northbound trains (bound for Richmond and Antioch) are on the second level. A side platform with one track (C2) for southbound trains (bound for Berryessa or San Francisco) is on the third level. The station has blue brickwork, contrasting with the red of nearby 12th Street Oakland City Center station.

The station has six public entrances: two at 20th Street, two at 19th Street, and two at 17th Street (one in an alley connecting to Telegraph Avenue). A surface elevator is located near 17th Street on the east side of Broadway; platform elevators are located at both ends of the station. There is a direct entrance from the mezzanine level to the 1970 Broadway building, as well as a disused entrance to 1955 Broadway. A 130-space valet parking bike station is located in a storefront at 19th Street, across Broadway from a station entrance.

The surface streets around 19th Street Oakland station are a major transfer point for AC Transit buses. The Uptown Transit Center, located on 20th Street west of Broadway, consists of six large shelters built in September 2006 to improve the ease of transfers. A number of routes stop on 20th Street shelters and/or on Broadway at the station:

- Transbay: NL
- Local: 6, 12, 18, 51A, 72, 72L, 72M, 88
- All-Nighter: 800, 802, 805, 851

Tempo route 1T service uses dedicated platforms on Broadway. The southbound platform is just south of 20th Street; the northbound (terminating) platform is between 17th Street and 19th Street.

== History ==
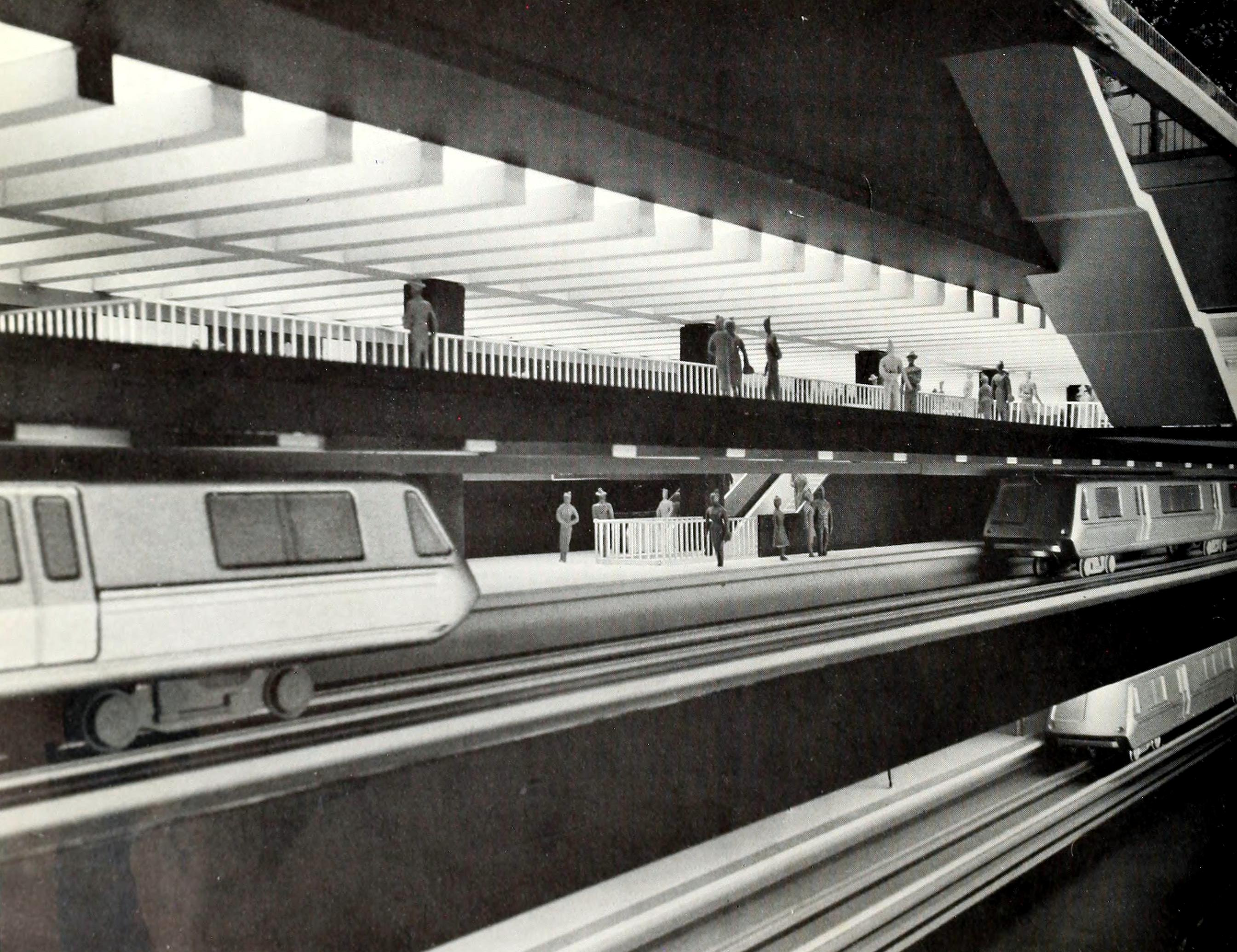
A 1960s model of the station

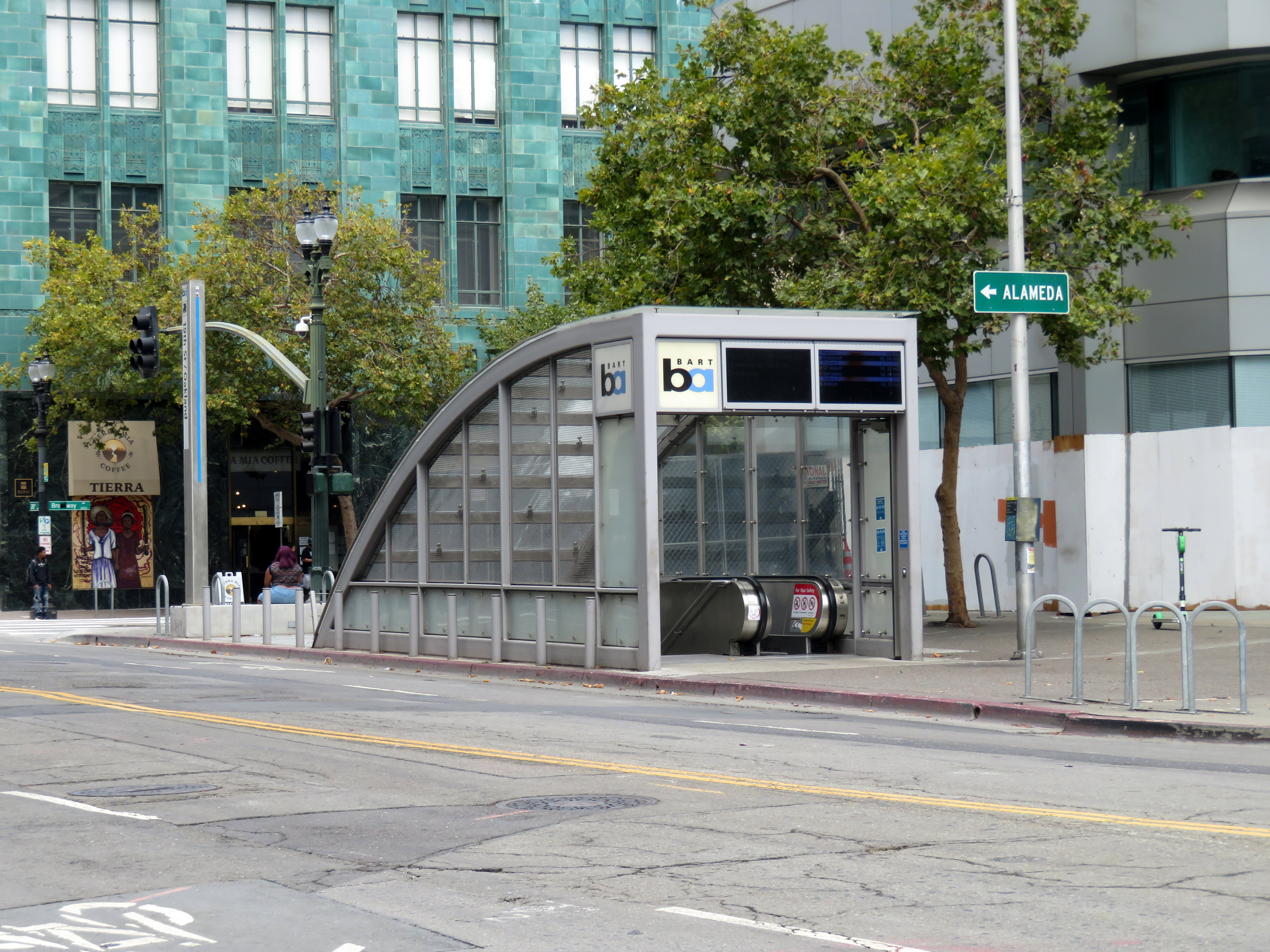
The 2015-built canopy at the 20th Street entrance

19th Street Oakland station, along with Oakland City Center/12th Street and Daly City stations, was designed by Gerard McCue and Associates. By August 1965, the city wanted to called the station "Oakland Downtown North", while BART preferred "Oakland-19". In October 1965, a BART committee recommended "19th Street". The BART Board approved 19th Street Oakland as the name that December. The station opened on September 11, 1972, as part of the first section of BART to open; service was extended to Richmond the next year. Service to Concord was added on May 21, 1973, and extended to San Francisco through the Transbay Tube on September 16, 1974. Richmond–San Francisco service was added on April 19, 1976.

The station was initially built without an elevator between the mezzanine and street level because the city of Oakland refused to allow elevator kiosks on the sidewalks. In March 1972, BART reached an agreement with The Bank of Tokyo for an easement to build an elevator in the building the bank was constructing at 1750 Broadway. The bank building and elevator opened on April 30, 1973; a remote teller window at the mezzanine level opened soon afterwards.

The station initially had one side platform on each level, with one track on the east side of each platform. The KE Track project, begun in 1980 and completed on March 17, 1986, converted the upper platform to an island platform with a new west track (Track CX). The new track was originally used for peak hour service (southbound towards San Francisco in the morning, and northbound in the evening).

Schedule changes on June 22, 1992, introduced timed cross-platform transfers between Richmond–Fremont line (now the Orange Line) and Concord–Daly City line (now the Yellow Line) trains. Oakland City Center/12th Street was the transfer point for northbound trains, while MacArthur station was the transfer point for southbound trains. On September 13, 2010, the northbound transfer point was changed to 19th Street Oakland station.

The Telegraph Avenue entrance was closed from October 14, 2013, to September 30, 2014, for renovations by the City of Oakland. The work included the installation of a kinechromatic sculpture, Shifting Topographies, by Dan Corson. The artwork consists of topographic contour layers of high-density foam coated with a color-shifting paint, which changes hue based on the sun angle and viewing angle. The entrance was closed again from February 3 to March 6, 2015, for the installation of colored glass panels covering vent shafts adjacent to the entrance. Shifting Topographies was damaged by fire on March 8, 2020.

In 2013, BART began design of a prototype glass canopy for the station entrance on the northeast corner of 20th Street and Broadway. The canopy would protect the escalator from weather damage, improve lighting, and allow the escalator to be fully closed off when the station is not open. The BART board voted to construct the canopy in January 2014; it was completed in March 2015 and includes real-time train arrival information screens at street level. The canopy reduced escalator downtime by one-third, prompting the installation of similar canopies at downtown San Francisco stations beginning in 2017.

Construction of the Oakland–San Leandro East Bay Bus Rapid Transit line (later branded Tempo) began in August 2016. Original plans had called for the line to use surface stops on 20th Street at the Uptown Transit Center. However, with the Berkeley leg on Telegraph Avenue cancelled, the stops were instead built on Broadway. Tempo route 1T service began on August 9, 2020.

A bike station in a storefront at 19th Street opened in February 2015. By 2017, the station filled on most weekday mornings; construction of a larger station on BART-owned land at 21st Street was recommended. By August 2020, BART had obtained $1.17 million of the estimated $8–9 million cost of the 400-space bike station.

A 2014 study produced a conceptual design for modernization of the station. A $32.7 million contract for a renovation project was awarded in July 2019. The three separate paid areas were consolidated, a new platform elevator added to the north end of the station, and the 2001-closed public restrooms rebuilt and reopened. The consolidation placed the elevator to the platforms inside paid area. Several pieces of public art were added as part of the renovation.

Construction began on January 25, 2020. Several entrances were closed from April 13, 2020, to June 12, 2021, due to low ridership during the COVID-19 pandemic. The entrance at the northwest corner of 20th Street and Broadway closed on June 15, 2021, for about six months as part of construction work. The Telegraph Avenue entrance was closed prior to this. The remodeled restrooms opened on February 25, 2022. A ribbon-cutting ceremony for the completed project was held on January 21, 2023.
