= Lake Merritt station =

Rapid transit station in Oakland, California, US

Lake Merritt
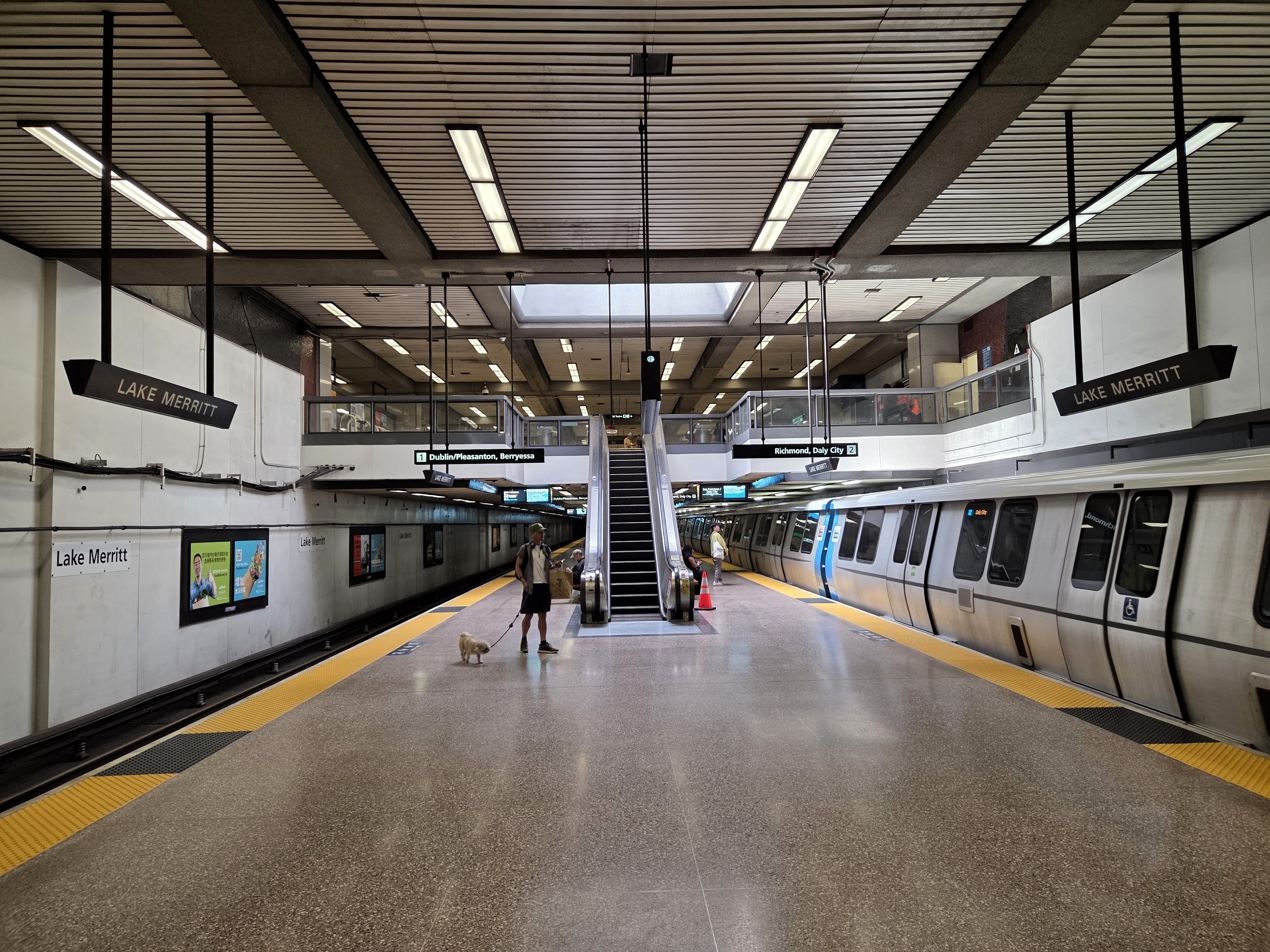
- A northbound train at Lake Merritt station in 2026

General information
- Location: 800 Madison Street; Oakland, California
- Coordinates: 37.79777°N 122.26659°W
- Line: BART A-Line
- Platforms: 1 island platform
- Tracks: 2
- Connections: AC Transit: 18, 62, 96; ACMC Highland Shuttle

Construction
- Structure type: Underground
- Parking: 207 spaces
- Cycle facilities: Racks, 84 lockers
- Accessible: Yes
- Architect: Yuill-Thornton, Warner & Levikov

Other information
- Station code: BART: LAKE

History
- Opened: September 11, 1972

Passengers
- 2025: 3,003 (weekday average)

Services
Preceding station	Bay Area Rapid Transit	Following station
West Oakland toward Daly City	Blue Line	Fruitvale toward Dublin/Pleasanton
West Oakland toward Daly City	Green Line	Fruitvale toward Berryessa
12th Street Oakland City Center toward Richmond	Orange Line	Fruitvale toward Berryessa
Location

Lake Merritt station is an underground Bay Area Rapid Transit (BART) station located east of Downtown Oakland near the eponymous Lake Merritt. The station is served by the Orange, Green, and Blue lines. It is the nearest BART station to Chinatown, Laney College, and Jack London Square station.

== Station layout ==
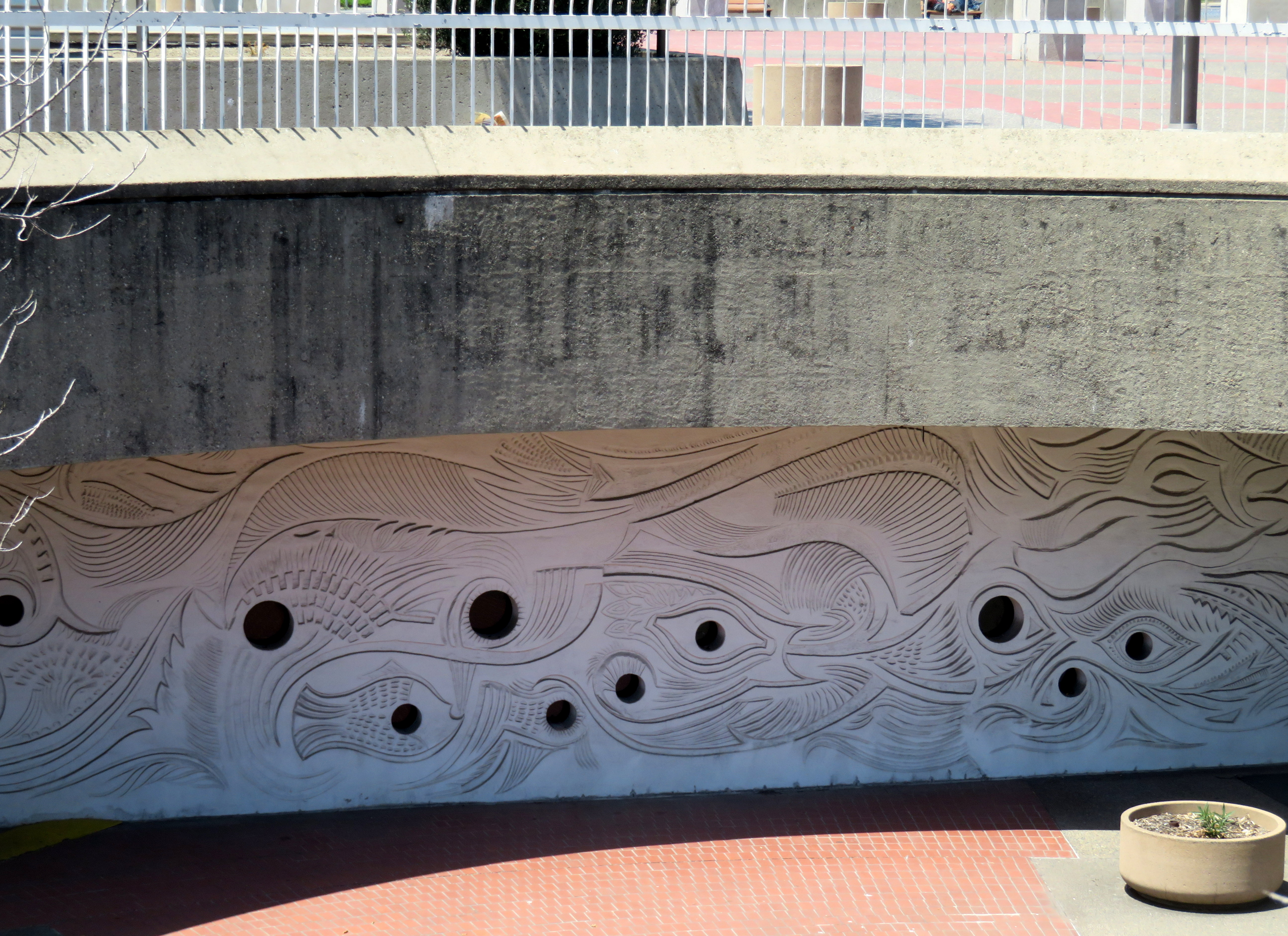
Artwork in the courtyard

The station has a single island platform located two levels below ground, with a fare mezzanine above it. The station has four entrances from Oak Street between 8th Street and 9th Street.

A largely-unused oval below-ground courtyard adjacent to the fare lobby includes reliefs of sea creatures and birds designed by William Mitchell. Now-closed portholes in the reliefs allowed the public to peer into the BART Operations Control Center. A fountain was originally located in the courtyard. Walls in the station feature tile work in red, black, and off-white by Alfonso Pardiñas.

== History ==
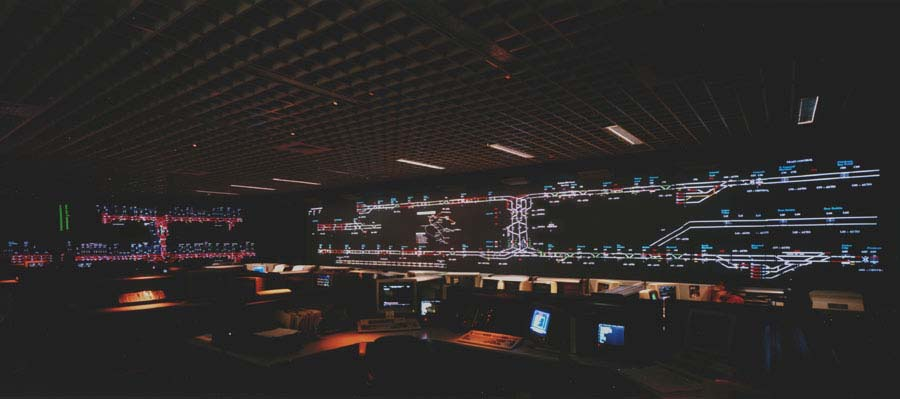
The BART Operations Control Center, located adjacent to the station

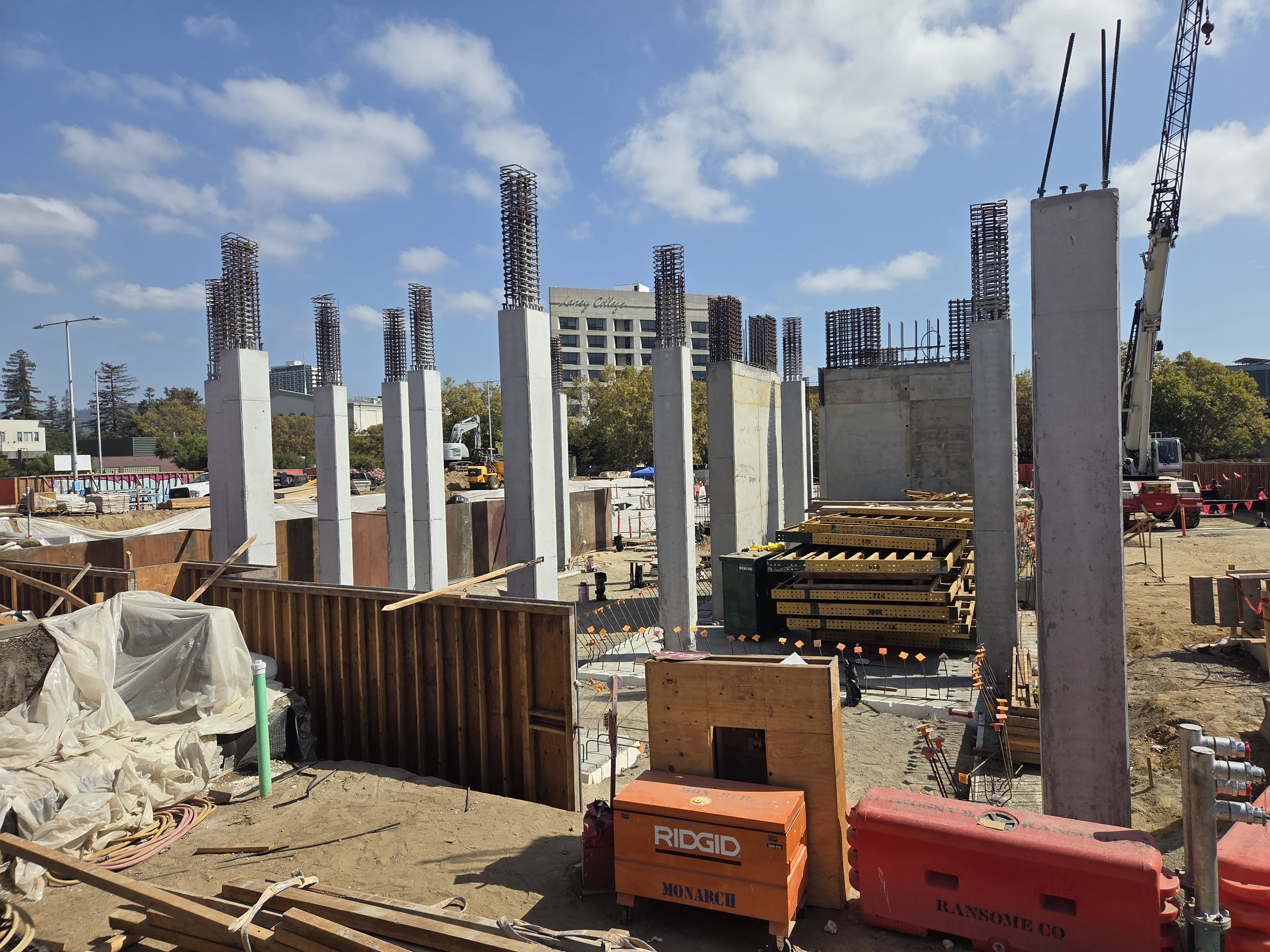
Development construction in September 2025

The construction of Lake Merritt station and the adjacent BART Administration Building leveled three blocks of Chinatown – one of several major displacements in the area, along with I-880, Laney College, and the Oakland Museum of California, that took place in the mid-20th century. By August 1965, the city of Oakland preferred the name "Peralta Center" for the station. However, a BART committee recommended "Lake Merritt" that October, which was approved in December.

The station opened on September 11, 1972 – part of the first section of BART to open. Due to a national strike that year by elevator constructors, elevator construction on the early stations was delayed. Lake Merritt was the only station on the initial segment with elevators available upon opening.

The BART Administration Building was located in a dedicated six-story office building constructed concurrently on top of the station. In 2003, due to potential risk of earthquake damage, the headquarters was moved away from the station to leased space in the Kaiser Center. The former Administration Building was dismantled in 2009–2010. Seismic retrofitting of the station took place in May–September 2009. Bathrooms at underground BART stations were closed after the September 11 attacks due to security concerns. The bathroom at Lake Meritt station reopened on June 28, 2022, after a renovation, with an attendant on duty during all operating hours.

In September 2018, the BART Board selected a developer for transit-oriented development on BART-owned land around the station. On September 8, 2022, the board approved plans for a 457-unit residential development to replace the station parking lot. The parking lot closed on September 16, 2024, to allow construction to begin. The first building will have 97 residential units; the second will have 360. Two additional buildings with 100 residential units and 500,000 square feet (46,000 m^{2}) of office space are planned in a future phase. They would use the parcel currently occupied by BART Police headquarters, which is planned to be relocated near the main BART offices in 2026. An additional phase would develop an isolated BART lot off 7th Street. As of 2024, BART indicates "significant market, local support, and/or implementation barriers" that must be overcome to allow that development; it would not begin until at least the mid-2030s.
