= MacArthur station (BART) =

Rapid transit station in San Francisco Bay Area

MacArthur
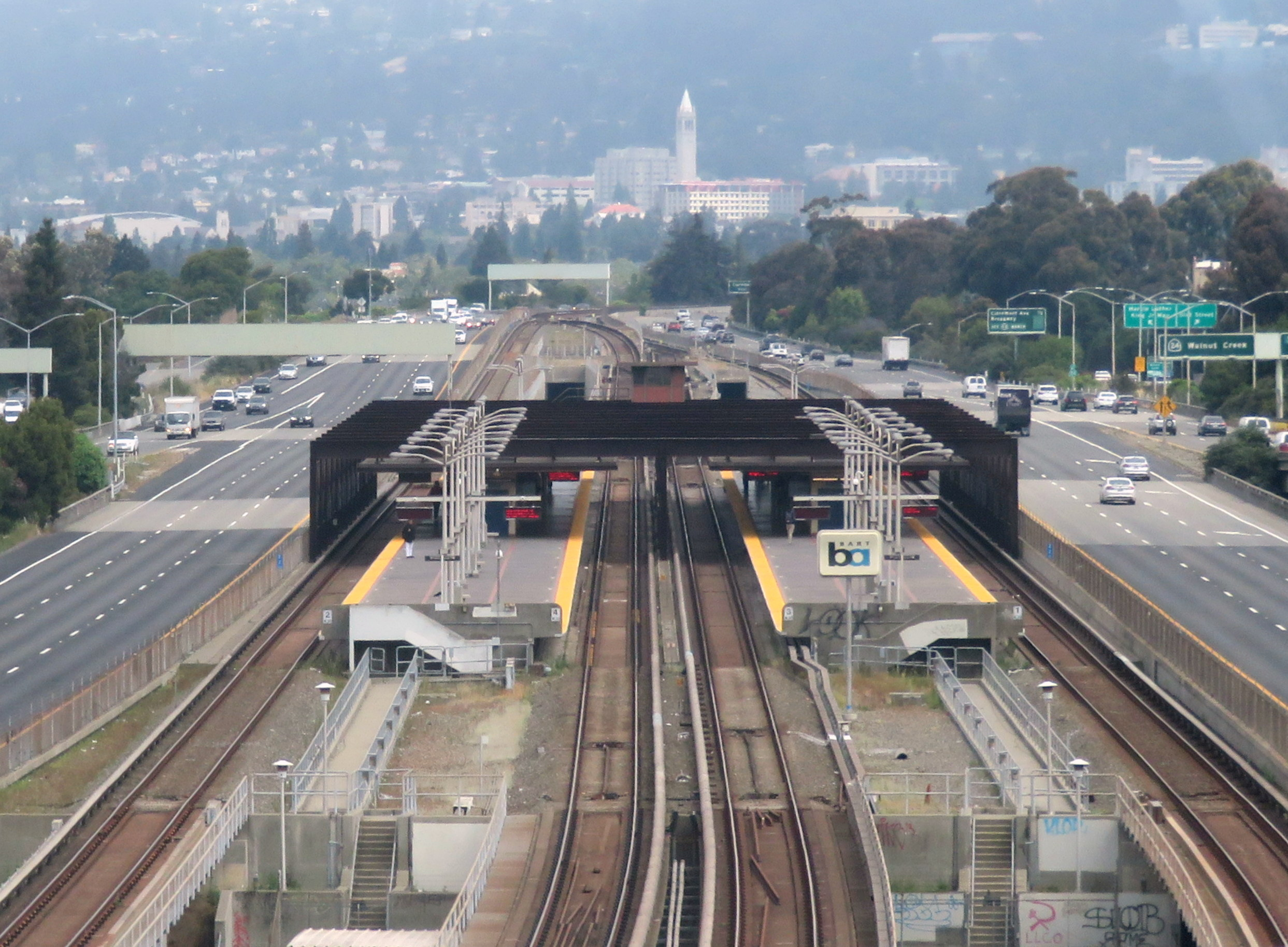
- MacArthur station viewed from the I-580/SR 24 interchange in 2019

General information
- Location: 555 40th Street (in SR 24 median); Oakland, California
- Coordinates: 37.8291°N 122.2671°W
- Owner: San Francisco Bay Area Rapid Transit District
- Line: BART K-Line
- Platforms: 2 island platforms
- Tracks: 4
- Connections: AC Transit; Alta Bates Summit Shuttles; Caltrans Bay Bridge Bicycle Shuttle; Emery Go-Round; Kaiser Shuttles

Construction
- Structure type: Elevated
- Parking: 602 spaces
- Cycle facilities: Racks, 40 lockers, bike station
- Accessible: Yes
- Architect: Maher & Martens

Other information
- Station code: BART: MCAR

History
- Opened: September 11, 1972

Passengers
- 2026: 4,843 (weekday average)

Services
Preceding station	Bay Area Rapid Transit	Following station
19th Street Oakland toward Berryessa	Orange Line	Ashby toward Richmond
19th Street Oakland toward Millbrae	Red Line	Ashby toward Richmond
19th Street Oakland toward SFO or Millbrae	Yellow Line	Rockridge toward Antioch via Pittsburg/Bay Point
Track layout
Location

MacArthur station is a Bay Area Rapid Transit (BART) station in the Temescal District of Oakland, California. It is located in the median of SR 24 just north of its interchange with I-580, perpendicular to 40th Street and MacArthur Boulevard. It is the largest station in the BART system, being the only one with four platform tracks. Service through MacArthur is timed for cross-platform transfers between the southbound lines that pass through the station. The surrounding neighborhood is mostly low-density residential, making MacArthur station primarily a commuting hub.

== History ==
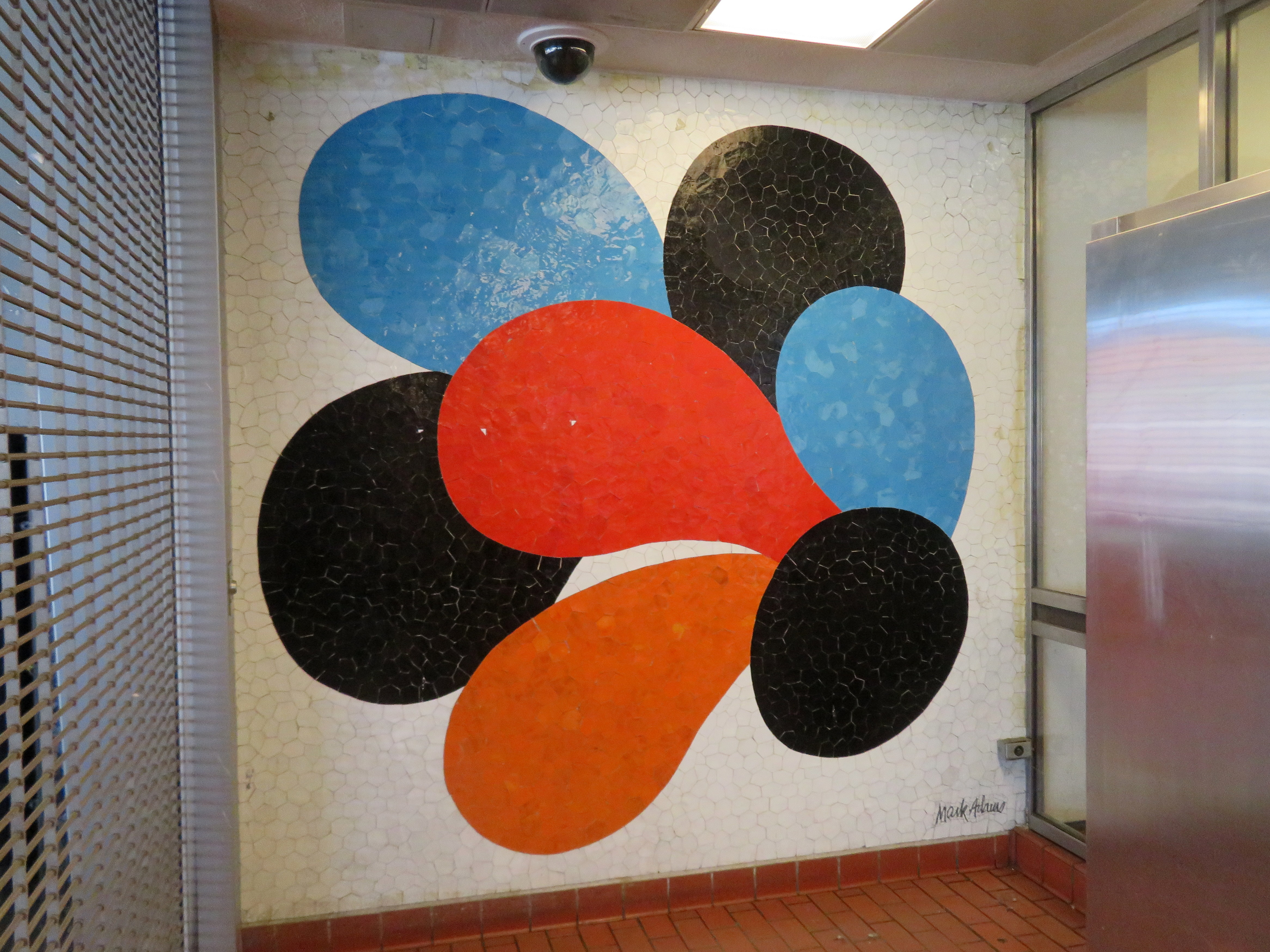
One of the tile mosaics at the station

By August 1965, the city of Oakland wanted to call the station "MacArthur", while BART preferred "Oakland North". A BART committee selected "MacArthur" in October 1965, rejecting a proposal for "Temescal". The BART Board approved the name in December 1965.

MacArthur station opened on September 11, 1972, as the northern terminus of the inaugural BART line (now the Orange Line) which ran to Fremont. Due to a national strike that year by elevator constructors, elevator construction on the early stations was delayed. Elevators at most of the initial stations, including MacArthur, were completed in the months following the opening. Service was extended north to Richmond on January 29, 1973. A second line between MacArthur and Concord (now the Yellow Line) opened on May 21, 1973; it was extended to San Francisco on September 16, 1974, when the Transbay Tube opened. Richmond–Daly City service via MacArthur (now the Red Line) began on April 19, 1976.

The station included several pieces of public art: an abstract mural by Mark Adams over a staircase (which Adams later replaced with two murals after the stairs were removed for an elevator in 2000), and tile mosaics by Adams and Alfonso Pardiñas in the fare lobby. On July 22, 2018, a man stabbed three women at the station, killing one of them. Sunday-only service to the station on the Dublin/Pleasanton line was operated from February 11, 2019 to February 10, 2020.

BART and the City of Oakland began planning in 1993 for transit-oriented development (TOD) to replace the surface parking lot east of the station. Construction of a 450-space BART parking garage at the southern end of the site began in mid-2011; it opened on September 15, 2014. A 90-unit residential building was constructed in 2013–2016, followed by a 385-unit residential complex with 33,000 square feet (3,100 m^{2}) of retail space constructed in 2015–2020. The latter project included a reconstruction of the plaza outside the station: planters were removed, a new concrete surface added, and a 200-space bike station was built. The work took place from June 2018 to August 2019. The final phase of TOD – a 24-story, 403-unit residential tower with 13,000 square feet (1,200 m^{2}) of retail space – was completed in early 2021. As of 2024, BART does not anticipate development on a smaller agency-owned parcel on the west side of SR 24 until the 2030s.

== Station layout ==
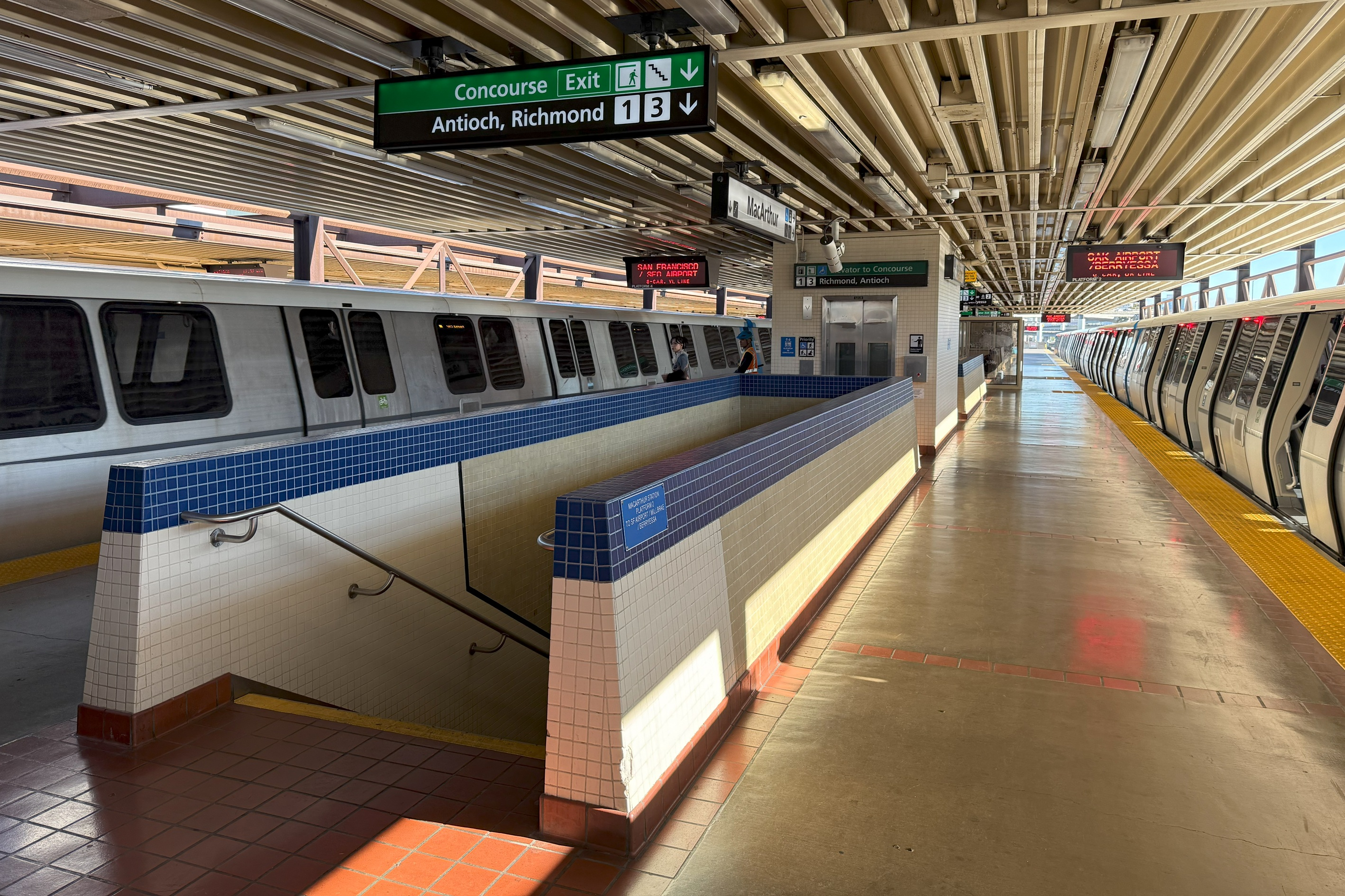
Southbound Yellow Line and Orange Line trains at the western platform

MacArthur station has two island platforms and four tracks, allowing cross-platform transfers between lines. Outer tracks 1 and 2 serve the Orange Line and Red Line lines; track 1 goes northbound toward Richmond, and track 2 goes southbound toward Berryessa/North San José and San Francisco. Inner tracks 3 and 4 serve the Yellow Line line; track 3 goes northbound toward Antioch, and track 4 goes southbound toward San Francisco. Connections between the lines are timed for southbound passengers. While a transfer is often possible between northbound services at MacArthur, 19th Street Oakland is the designated transfer point for northbound service. South of MacArthur, southbound trains converge onto a single track toward downtown Oakland; San Francisco-bound trains depart before Berryessa-bound trains.

The final Yellow and Orange line trains of the day in both directions have a "grand meet" at MacArthur, providing timed transfers in all directions. Unlike typical timed transfers, in which trains hold for about 30 seconds, trains wait longer during the grand meet to allow passengers to change platforms. If there are any delays, trains will wait to allow passengers to make their connections. The grand meet has been part of BART scheduling since the beginning of multi-line service.

MacArthur tends to be crowded in the morning because of the high volume of transfers between the two lines, with relatively few passengers exiting while many are boarding.

=== Bus connections ===
MacArthur station is served by several AC Transit routes: local route 57 on 40th Street, local route 18 on Martin Luther King Jr. Way west of the station, and local route 6 and All Nighter route 800 on Telegraph Avenue east of the station. Emery Go-Round buses serving Emeryville stop on 40th Street. Several shuttle routes stop on Walter Miles Way (also known as BART Access Road) east of the station entrance, including the Caltrans Bay Bridge Bike Shuttle, three Kaiser Shuttle routes, and four Alta Bates shuttle routes.
