= Orange Line (BART) =

Rapid transit line in the San Francisco Bay Area, California

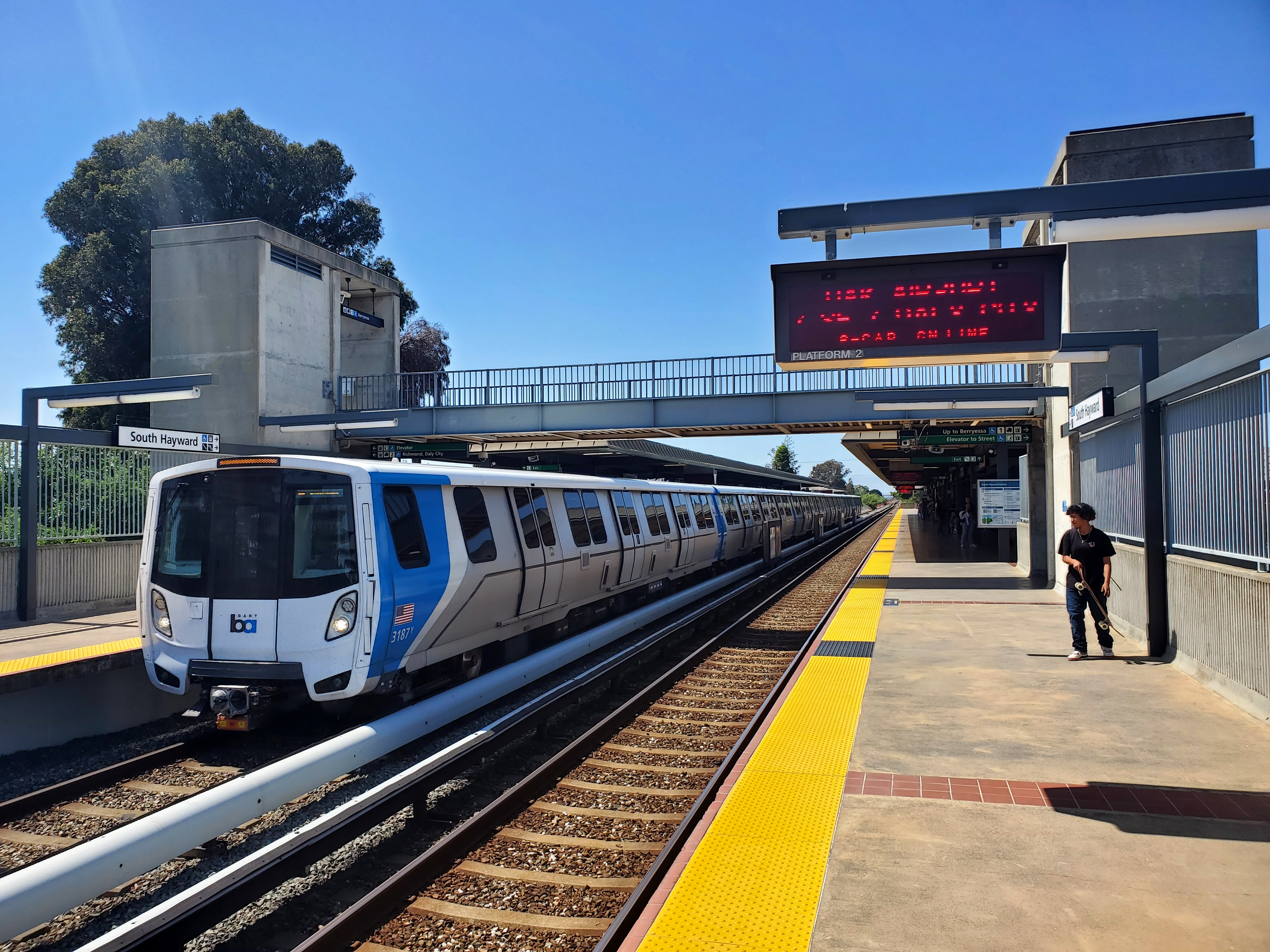
- Orange Line train at South Hayward station, 2024

Overview
- Owner: San Francisco Bay Area Rapid Transit District
- Locale: South Bay, East Bay
- Termini: Berryessa; Richmond
- Stations: 21

Service
- Type: Rapid transit
- System: Bay Area Rapid Transit

History
- Opened: September 11, 1972
- Last extension: June 13, 2020

Technical
- Line length: 51 mi (82 km)
- Track gauge: 5 ft 6 in (1,676 mm)
- Electrification: Third rail, 1 kV DC
- Operating speed: 70 mph (110 km/h)
Route map
Orange Line highlighted in orange

The Orange Line is a Bay Area Rapid Transit (BART) line in the San Francisco Bay Area that runs between Berryessa/North San José station and Richmond station. It has 21 stations in San Jose, Milpitas, Fremont, Union City, Hayward, San Leandro, Oakland, Berkeley, El Cerrito, and Richmond. It is the only one of the five primary BART services that does not run through the Transbay Tube to San Francisco; however, it shares tracks with the four other primary services in the East Bay.

== History ==
The Orange Line was the first BART line to open. Initial services between MacArthur and Fremont stations began on September 11, 1972, with full service extending to Richmond beginning on January 29, 1973.

The line would not see any major changes for another 45 years, until the start of the Silicon Valley BART extension. The first phase of the project extended the line to Warm Springs/South Fremont station in March 2017, the second phase added Berryessa/North San José and Milpitas stations in June 2020.

== Route ==
The Orange Line runs primarily north-south through the East Bay. It uses the R-Line between Richmond station and just north of MacArthur station, the K-Line between MacArthur and the Oakland Wye, the A-Line between the Wye and Fremont station, and the S-Line between Fremont and Berryessa/North San José station. Most sections are at-grade or elevated; the line runs through tunnels in downtown Berkeley, downtown Oakland, and under Lake Elizabeth.

=== Stations ===
Station	Jurisdiction	County	Opened	Rail connections
Richmond	Richmond	Contra Costa	January 29, 1973	BART: Amtrak: Capitol Corridor, Gold Runner, California Zephyr
El Cerrito del Norte	El Cerrito	Contra Costa	January 29, 1973	BART:
El Cerrito Plaza	El Cerrito	Contra Costa	January 29, 1973	BART:
North Berkeley	Berkeley	Alameda	January 29, 1973	BART:
Downtown Berkeley	Berkeley	Alameda	January 29, 1973	BART:
Ashby	Berkeley	Alameda	January 29, 1973	BART:
MacArthur	Oakland	Alameda	September 11, 1972	BART:
19th Street Oakland	Oakland	Alameda	September 11, 1972	BART:
12th Street Oakland City Center	Oakland	Alameda	September 11, 1972	BART:
Lake Merritt	Oakland	Alameda	September 11, 1972	BART:
Fruitvale	Oakland	Alameda	September 11, 1972	BART:
Coliseum	Oakland	Alameda	September 11, 1972	BART: Amtrak: Capitol Corridor
San Leandro	San Leandro	Alameda	September 11, 1972	BART:
Bay Fair	San Leandro	Alameda	September 11, 1972	BART:
Hayward	Hayward	Alameda	September 11, 1972	BART:
South Hayward	Hayward	Alameda	September 11, 1972	BART:
Union City	Union City	Alameda	September 11, 1972	BART:
Fremont	Fremont	Alameda	September 11, 1972	BART:
Warm Springs/South Fremont	Fremont	Alameda	March 25, 2017	BART:
Milpitas	Milpitas	Santa Clara	June 13, 2020	BART: VTA:
Berryessa/North San José	San Jose	Santa Clara	June 13, 2020	BART:
