= Berryessa/North San José station =

BART station in San Jose, California, United States

Berryessa North San José
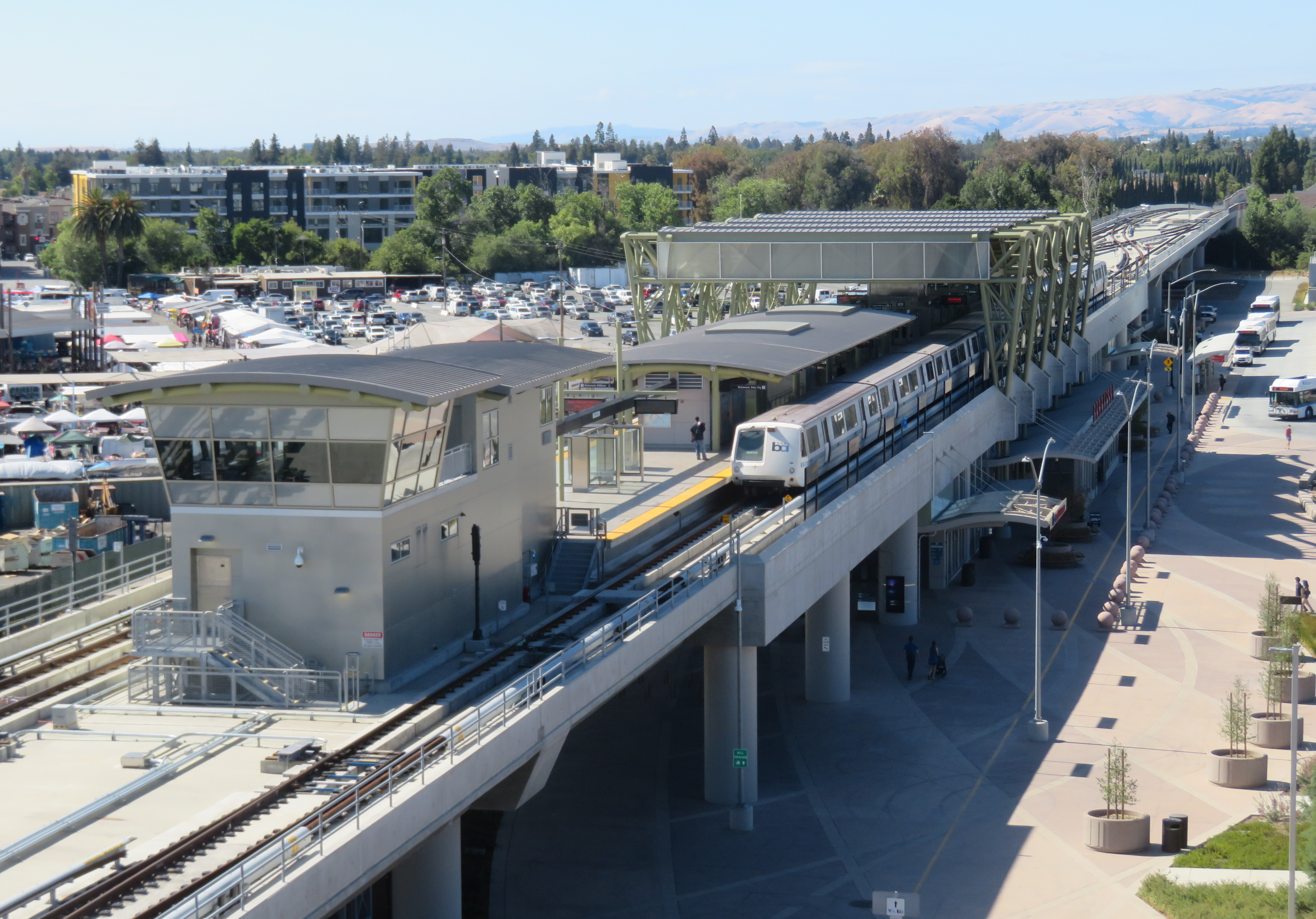
- The station on the first day of service in June 2020

General information
- Other names: Berryessa Transit Center, Berryessa
- Location: 925 Berryessa Station Way; San Jose, California
- Coordinates: 37.3683606°N 121.8746546°W
- Owner: Santa Clara Valley Transportation Authority
- Line: BART S-Line
- Platforms: 1 island platform
- Tracks: 2
- Connections: VTA Bus: 61, 70, 77, Rapid 500

Construction
- Structure type: Elevated
- Parking: 1,527 spaces
- Cycle facilities: Yes
- Accessible: Yes

Other information
- Station code: BART: BERY

History
- Opened: December 28, 2019 (bus service); June 13, 2020 (BART)

Passengers
- 2026: 2,019 (weekday average)

Services
Preceding station	Bay Area Rapid Transit	Following station
Milpitas toward Daly City	Green Line	Terminus
Milpitas toward Richmond	Orange Line	Terminus
Future service (2036)
Preceding station	Bay Area Rapid Transit	Following station
Milpitas toward Daly City	Green Line Silicon Valley extension	28th Street/Little Portugal toward Santa Clara
Milpitas toward Richmond	Orange Line Silicon Valley extension	28th Street/Little Portugal toward Santa Clara
Location

Berryessa/North San José station (also known as Berryessa station and Berryessa Transit Center) is an intermodal transit center located in the Berryessa district of San Jose, California, United States. The station is served by Bay Area Rapid Transit (BART) and Santa Clara Valley Transportation Authority (VTA) buses. The transit center opened for bus service on December 28, 2019, and subsequently for BART service on June 13, 2020. The station is the southern terminus of the Orange and Green lines.

The station was built and is owned by VTA, while BART operates train service with funding from VTA. The bus bays and parking garages are operated by VTA. It is the first BART station ever built in San Jose, and service will terminate here until the completion of the downtown San Jose subway (the last phase of the Silicon Valley BART extension).

== Station layout ==
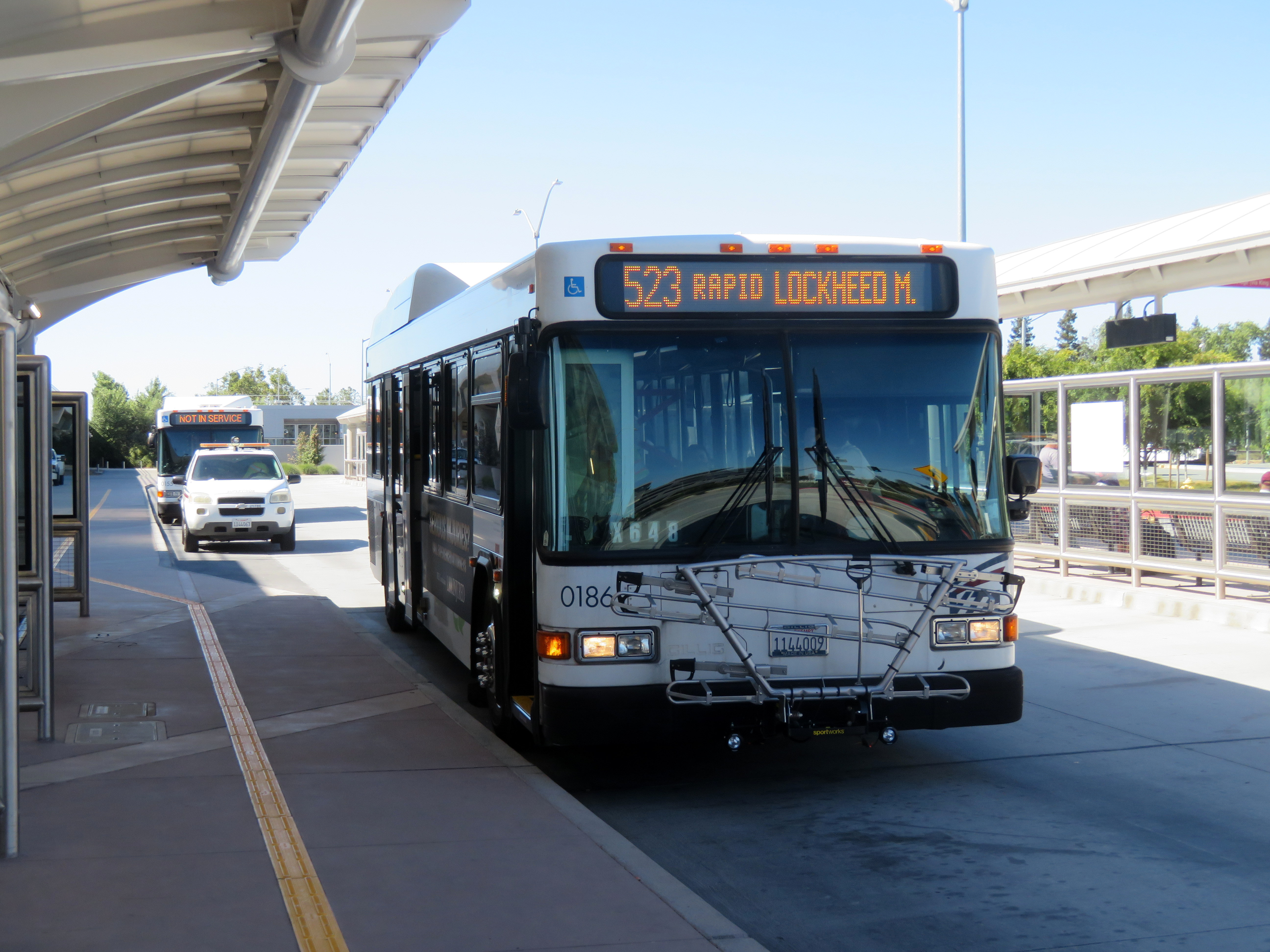
VTA route 523 bus at Berryessa

Berryessa/North San José station has a 30-by-700-foot (9.1 m × 213.4 m) elevated island platform, with a fare lobby under the center of the platform. An adjacent seven-story garage and surface lot have a combined 1,527 parking spaces, while a bike station is located under the north end of the platform. The site is adjacent to the San Jose Flea Market.

The Berryessa Transit Center, a two-lane bus transfer facility, is located adjacent to the north end of the station. It is served by VTA Bus routes 61, 70, 77, and Rapid 500. Rapid 500 provides limited-stop connections to Downtown San Jose and also serves San Jose Diridon station.

The station features a 15-foot-tall (4.6 m) cast bronze sculpture by Larry Kirkland, titled LIFE!, outside the main BART entrance. The sculpture depicts a wheel made of various items from daily life being rolled by a human figurine.

== History ==
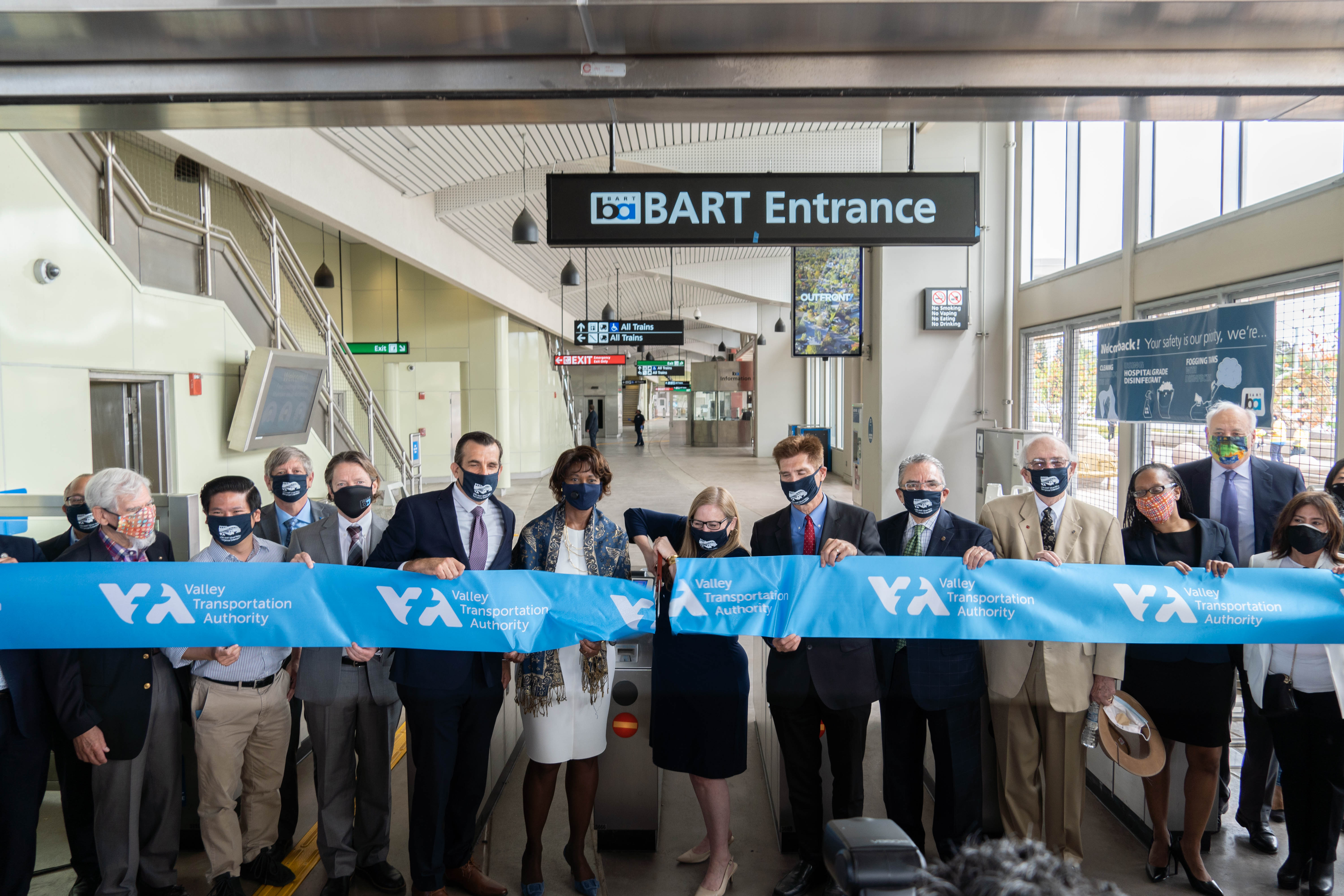
The station's ribbon-cutting ceremony on June 12, 2020

This station is the southern of the two stations built as part of an extension from Warm Springs/South Fremont. The extension, known as Phase I of the Silicon Valley BART extension, broke ground in 2012 with completion initially expected in 2016 but delayed several times. VTA received a $900 million grant for federal funding for the $2.3-billion Silicon Valley Extension in 2012. Additional funding was provided by Measure B, a half-cent sales tax passed by Santa Clara County voters in 2016; the Road Repair and Accountability Act, passed by the California Legislature in 2017; and $125 million from the Federal Transit Administration in 2019 under a fast-track funding program.

In 2017, at the request of the San Jose City Council, the station was renamed from Berryessa to "Berryessa/North San José" to "alert riders – commuters and tourists alike – that they have arrived in the Capital of the Silicon Valley".

On June 11, 2020, a group of Silicon Valley politicians proposed to have the station officially renamed as the "Ron Gonzales Berryessa Station" after Ron Gonzales, former mayor of San Jose, who began advocating for a Silicon Valley BART extension in 1989 while serving as a Santa Clara County Supervisor. BART station naming guidelines would likely discourage such a renaming.

An official ribbon cutting for the BART station was held on June 12, 2020. Berryessa/North San José and Milpitas stations opened for revenue service on June 13, 2020.
