= Wheels (bus service) =

Bus service in southeast Alameda County

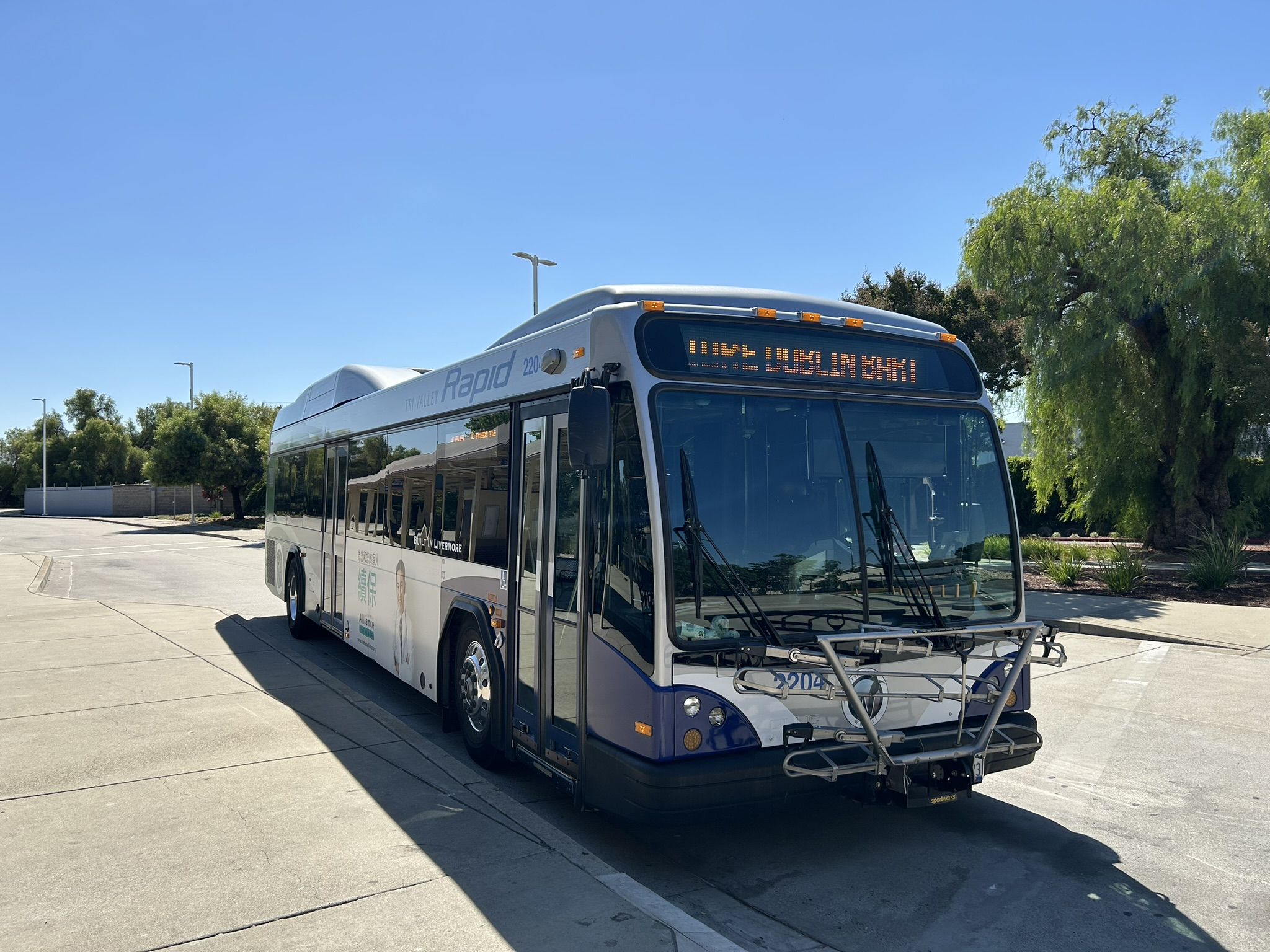
- Wheels bus at Livermore station in July 2024
- Parent: Livermore Amador Valley Transit Authority
- Founded: May 1985
- Headquarters: 1362 Rutan Court, Suite 100; Livermore, California
- Service area: Tri-Valley
- Service type: Bus service, paratransit
- Routes: 27
- Stops: ~500
- Destinations: Livermore, Dublin, Pleasanton
- Hubs: Dublin/Pleasanton station, Livermore Transit Center
- Fleet: 74 buses
- Daily ridership: 4,800 (weekdays, Q4 2025)
- Annual ridership: 1,344,900 (2025)
- Operator: MV Transportation
- Website: wheelsbus.com

Wheels is a public bus service in the Tri-Valley region (southeast Alameda County) of the San Francisco Bay Area in California, United States. It is operated by the Livermore Amador Valley Transit Authority (LAVTA). Wheels operates local and limited-stop service in Dublin, Pleasanton, and Livermore, with limited service into Contra Costa County along Interstate 680. The LAVTA was formed in 1985; service began in Dublin and Pleasanton in 1986. In 1987, it took over the 1978-opened Rideo service in Livermore. In 2025, the system had a ridership of 1,344,900, or about 4,800 per weekday as of the fourth quarter of 2025.

== Routes ==
As of March 2024, Wheels operates 15 regular routes. This includes two Rapid routes (10R and 30R) with limited stops and frequent all-day service, and three express routes (20X, 70X and 580X) with limited peak-hour service. Fifteen additional routes, numbered 501–504 and 601–611, operate a small number of trips to serve schools. The primary transfer hubs are at Dublin/Pleasanton station (served by BART) and Livermore Transit Center (served by ACE).

- 1 Gleason/Hacienda
- 2 East Dublin/Fallon Middle School
- 3 Stoneridge
- 4 Central Dublin
- 8 Hopyard
- 10R Pleasanton-Livermore
- 14 Pleasanton-Livermore
- 15 Springtown
- 18 Granada
- 20X Vasco
- 30R Dublin-Livermore
- 53 Stoneridge
- 54 Hacienda
- 70X Pleasant Hill
- 580X Airway

== History ==
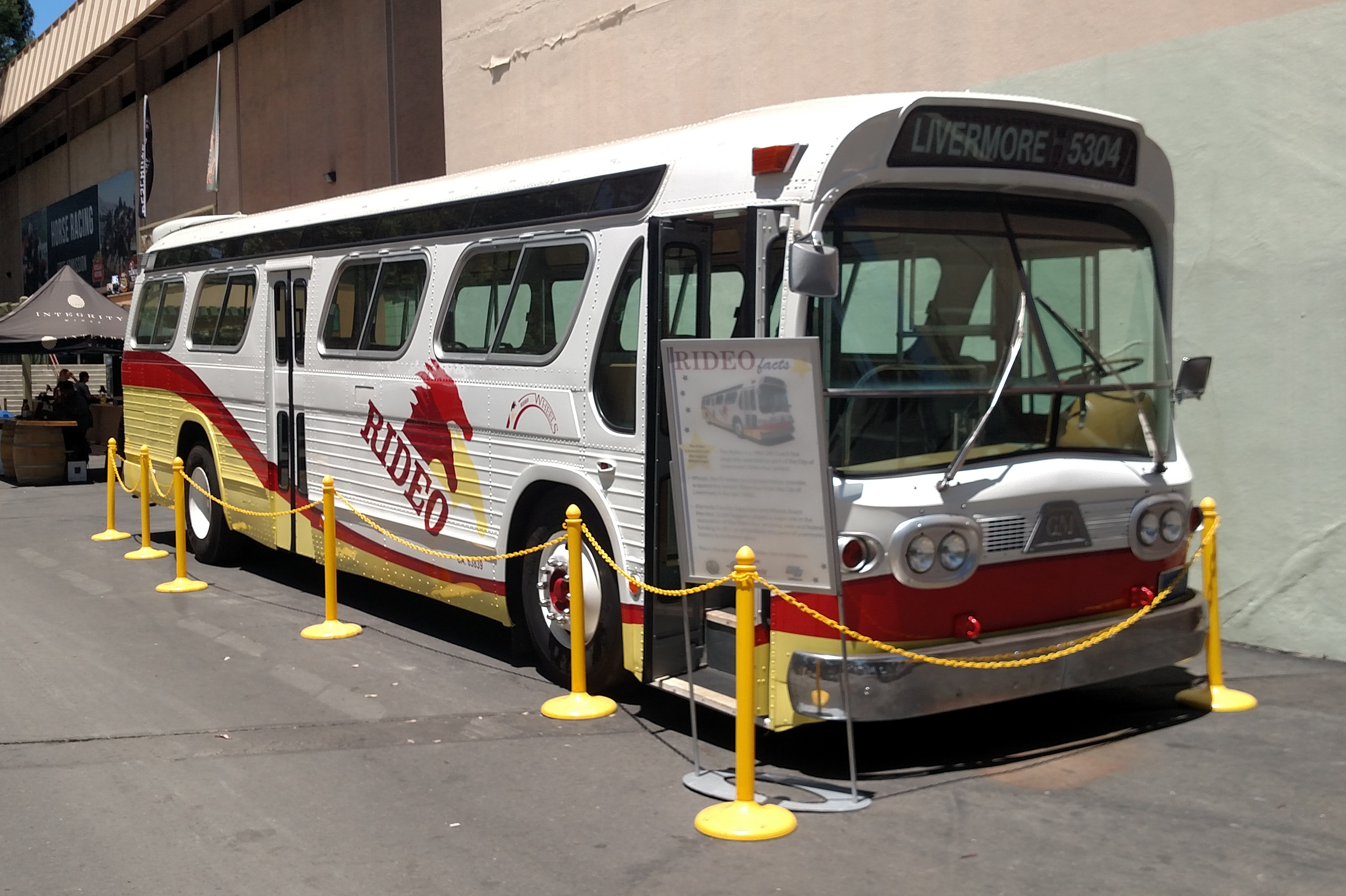
A preserved Rideo bus in 2019

Rideo local bus service in Livermore began on August 7, 1978. In 1984, Dublin and Pleasanton began planning a local bus system, which Livermore was initially apprehensive about joining. In May 1985, the three cities plus Alameda County formed the Livermore Amador Valley Transit Authority (LAVTA) as a joint powers authority. The Metropolitan Transportation Commission provided initial funding in September 1985. The new bus service, branded as "Wheels", began operating in Dublin and Pleasanton on July 1, 1986. It initially had nine buses operating on hourly headways, which ran on weekdays and Saturdays but not Sundays. Rideo was merged into Wheels in July 1987.

A new maintenance facility was opened in September 1991, serving the 34 buses delivered the previous year. Paratransit service began in January 1996. Wheels began connecting to regional rail service with the introduction of BART service to Dublin/Pleasanton station in 1997 and ACE service to Livermore in 1998. Route 70X service between Dublin/Pleasanton and Walnut Creek began in January 1999. Until June 27, 2009, Wheels operated All-Nighter route 810 between Bay Fair station and Livermore.

In 2004, the BART I-580 Corridor Transit Study found that a BART extension to Livermore would not be feasible. Instead, the report recommended a rapid bus network serving the Tri-Valley. Construction on the "Tri-Valley Rapid" project took place from November 2009 to December 2010. Service on route R, which ran between West Dublin/Pleasanton station and Lawrence Livermore National Laboratory via Dublin, began on January 24, 2011. The weekday-only route operated every 10 minutes at peak and 15 minutes off-peak. It included some bus rapid transit elements like wider stop spacing, signal priority, and queue jumps. On August 13, 2016, local route 10 was converted to Rapid route 10R. It ran between Dublin/Pleasanton station and Livermore via Pleasanton. Route R was rerouted via Las Positas College and renamed route 30R at that time. By 2019, the two Rapid routes represented half of Wheels ridership.
