= San Leandro station =

Rapid transit station in San Francisco Bay Area

San Leandro
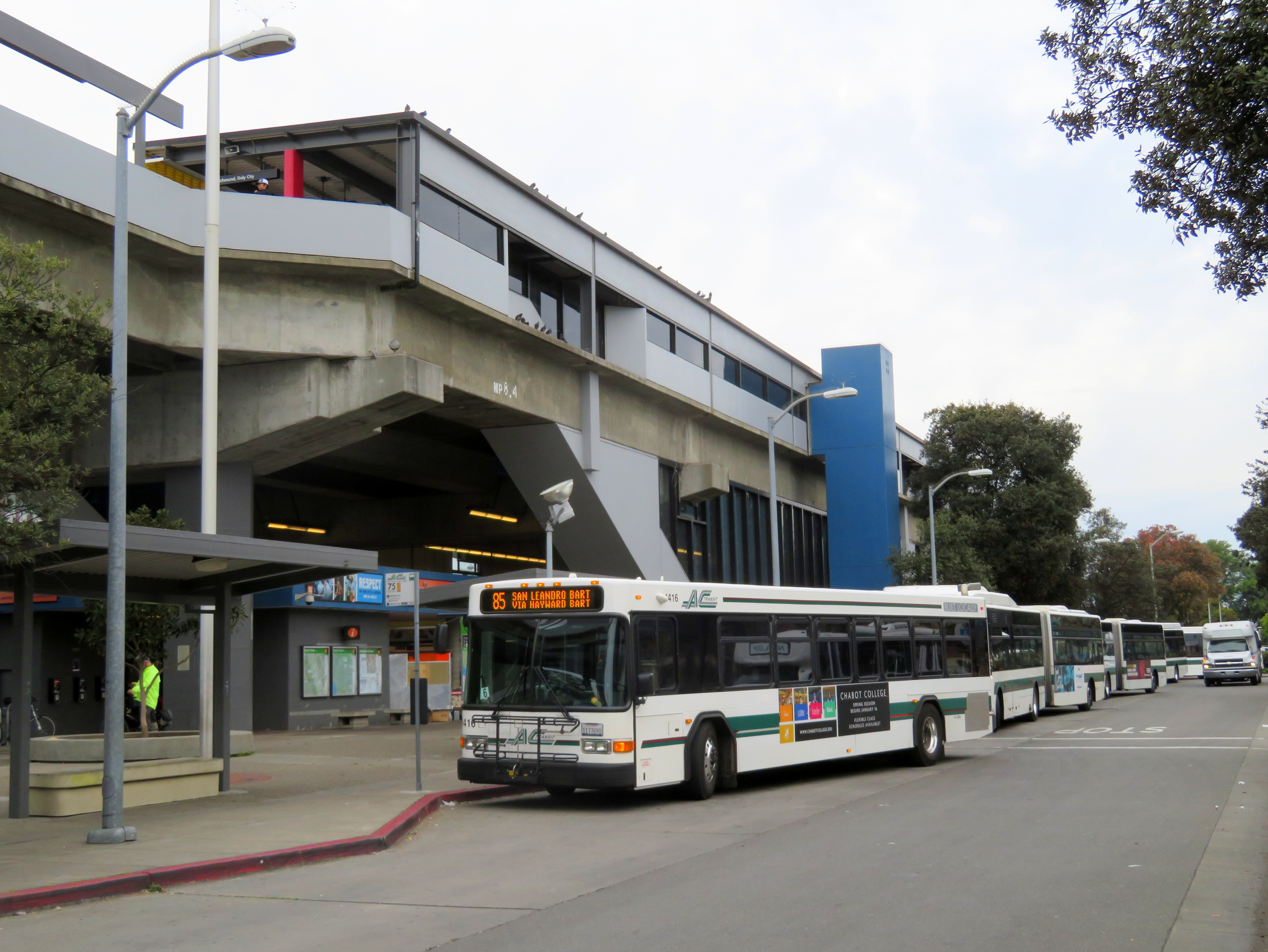
- San Leandro station and AC Transit buses in April 2018

General information
- Location: 1401 San Leandro Boulevard; San Leandro, California
- Coordinates: 37.72176°N 122.16068°W
- Line: BART A-Line
- Platforms: 2 side platforms
- Tracks: 2
- Connections: AC Transit: 1T, 9, 28, 34, 35, 801; LINKS: North Loop, South Loop; Kaiser Permanente Shuttle

Construction
- Structure type: Elevated
- Parking: 1,224 spaces
- Cycle facilities: 28 lockers
- Accessible: Yes
- Architect: Gwathmey, Sellier & Crosby; Joseph Esherick & Associates

Other information
- Station code: BART: SANL

History
- Opened: September 11, 1972

Passengers
- 2025: 3,441 (weekday average)

Services
Preceding station	Bay Area Rapid Transit	Following station
Coliseum toward Daly City	Blue Line	Bay Fair toward Dublin/Pleasanton
Coliseum toward Daly City	Green Line	Bay Fair toward Berryessa
Coliseum toward Richmond	Orange Line	Bay Fair toward Berryessa
Preceding station	AC Transit	Following station
Downtown San Leandro toward Uptown Transit Center	Tempo	Terminus
Location

San Leandro station is a Bay Area Rapid Transit (BART) station located off Davis Street (Route 61/122) in downtown San Leandro, California. The station has two elevated side platforms, with the faregates at ground level. The station is served by the Orange, Green, and Blue lines.

== History ==
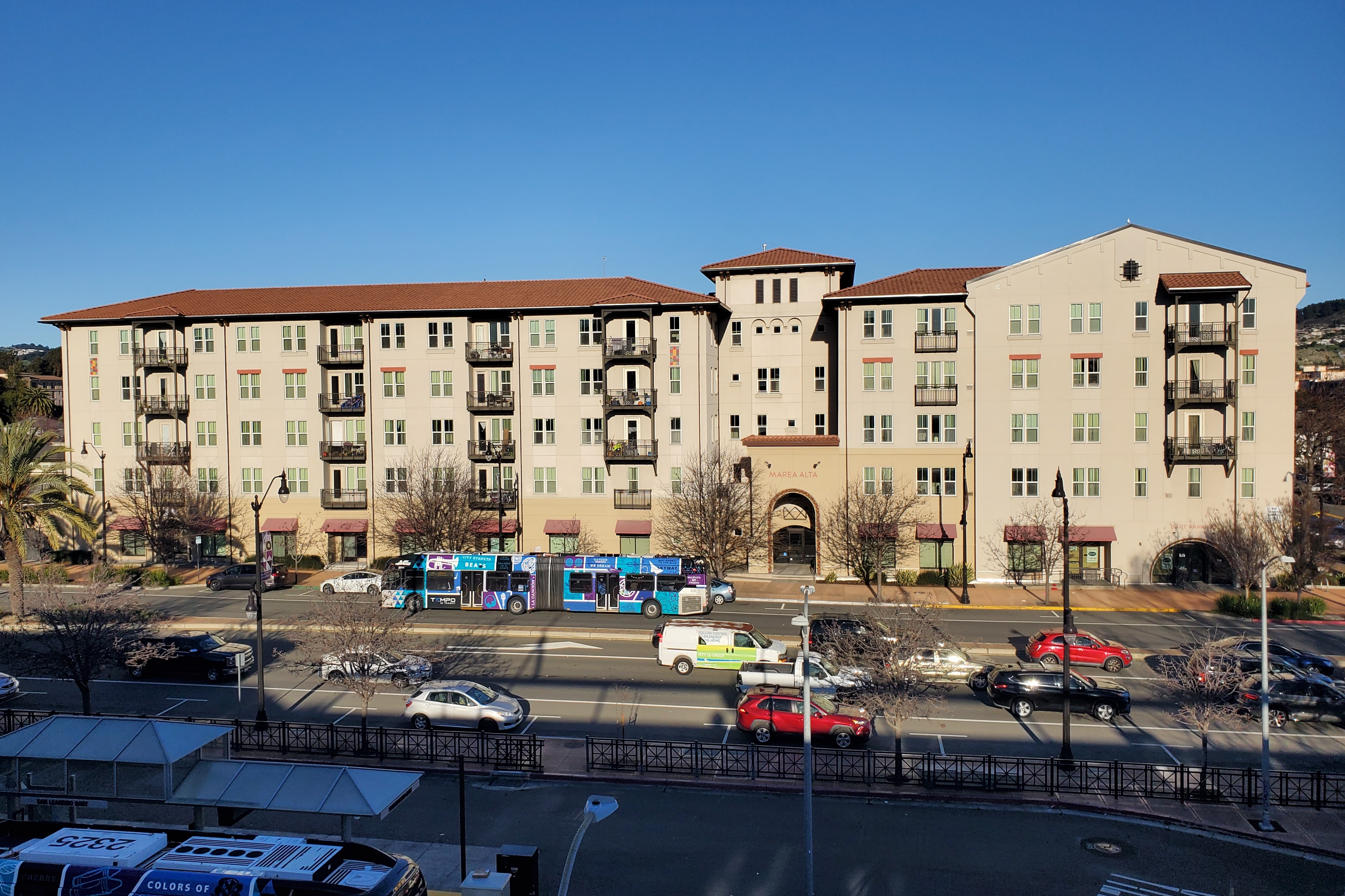
The 2010s development at the station

The BART Board approved the name "San Leandro" in December 1965. The station opened on September 11, 1972 – part of the first BART line. Due to a national strike that year by elevator constructors, elevator construction on the early stations was delayed. Elevators at most of the initial stations, including San Leandro, were completed in the months following the opening.

Construction of transit-oriented development (TOD) to replace one of the surface parking lots at the station began in late 2014. The project, which included 200 residential units and 6,000 square feet (560 m^{2}) of commercial space, was completed in two phases in 2017 and 2019. As of 2024, BART indicates "significant market, local support, and/or implementation barriers" that must be overcome to allow additional TOD on the remaining parking lots at the station. Such development would not begin until at least the mid-2030s.

On the morning of May 20, 2025, a fire at San Leandro station damaged train control equipment and traction power cables, shutting down service from Lake Merritt station south. Service resumed south of Bay Fair that evening, and between Bay Fair and Lake Merritt the following morning, though Green Line service remained suspended.

== Bus connections ==
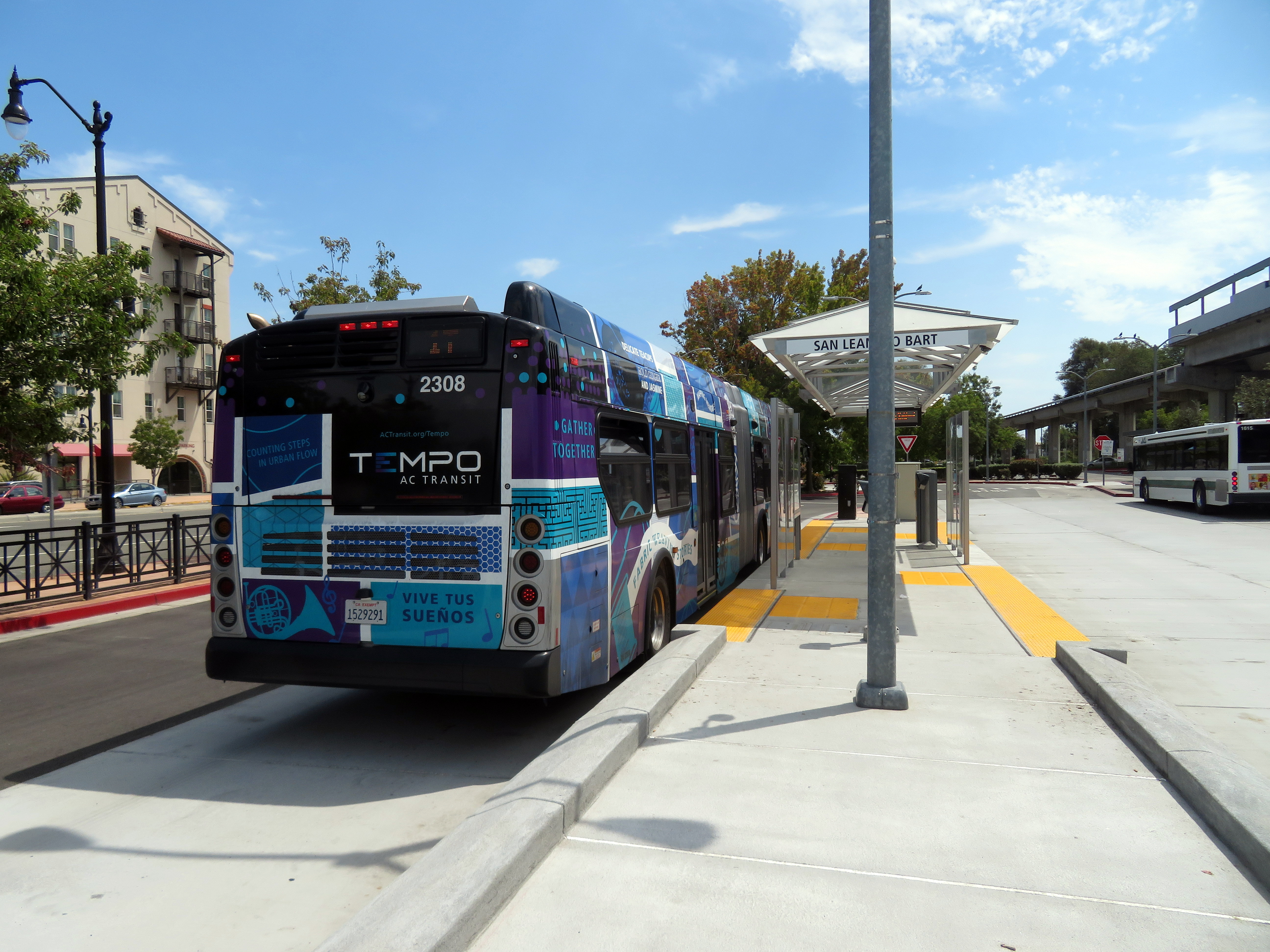
Tempo bus at San Leandro station in 2020

Like most BART stations, San Leandro station is served by AC Transit local buses, municipal circulators, and medical shuttles:

- AC Transit: 1T, 9, 28, 34, 35, 801
- San Leandro LINKS: North Loop, South Loop
- Kaiser Permanente: San Leandro Medical Center shuttle

A busway is located on the east side of the station. A five-month project to renovate the busway for Tempo bus rapid transit service began in August 2019.

== See also ==
- List of Bay Area Rapid Transit stations
