= Oakland Coliseum station =

Rail station complex in Oakland, California, US

Coliseum
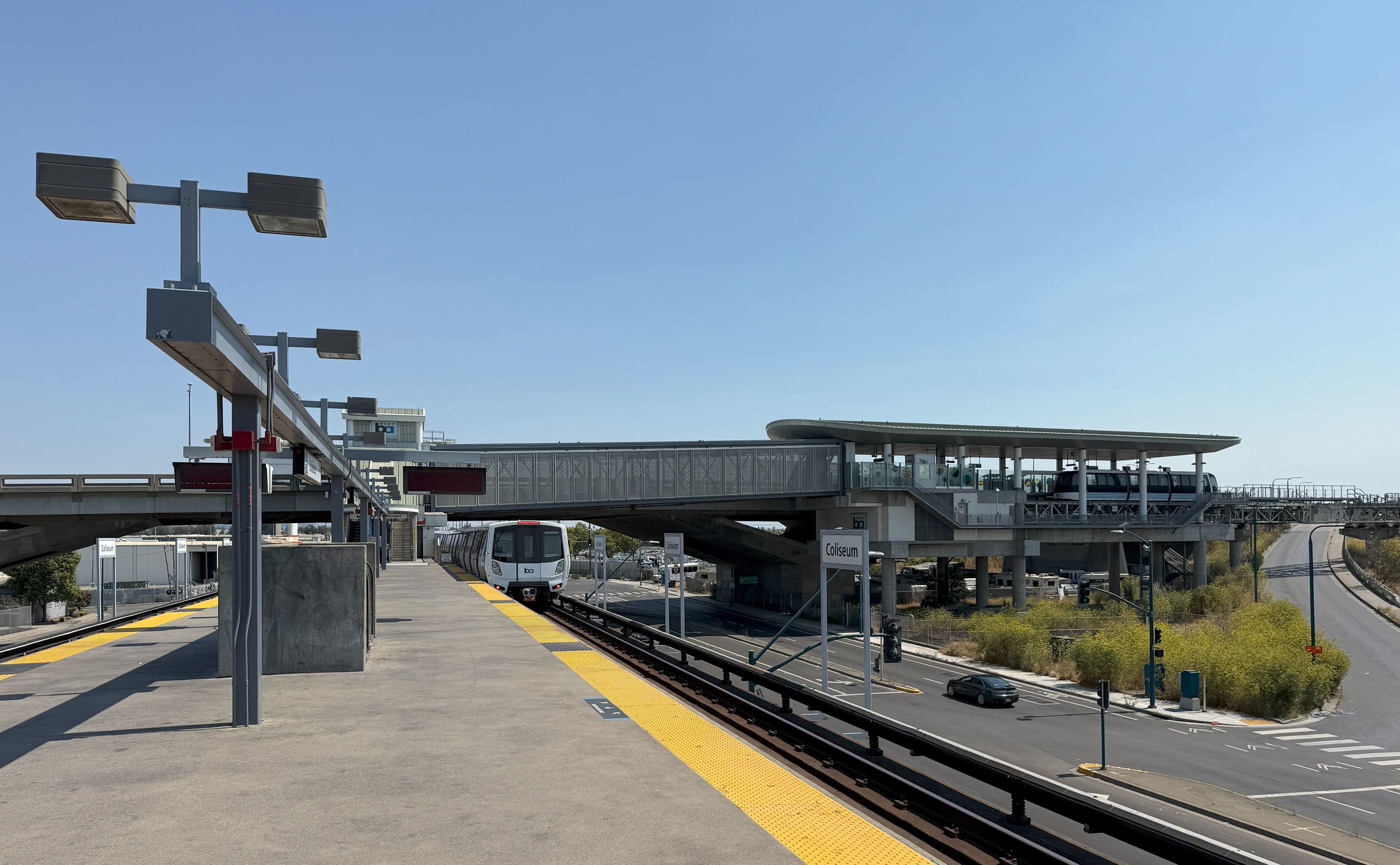
- BART and Oakland Airport Connector platforms, 2025

General information
- Location: 700 73rd Avenue (Amtrak); 7200 San Leandro Street (BART); Oakland, California; United States
- Coordinates: 37.75243°N 122.19814°W (Amtrak); 37.75370°N 122.19685°W (BART)
- Owner: Bay Area Rapid Transit, City of Oakland, Union Pacific Railroad
- Lines: UP Niles Subdivision (Amtrak station); BART A-Line; BART H-Line
- Platforms: 1 side platform (Amtrak); 1 island platform (BART); 1 side platform (Oakland Airport Connector)
- Tracks: 3 (Amtrak); 2 (BART); 1 (Oakland Airport Connector)
- Bus stands: 6
- Connections: AC Transit: 45, 46L, 73, 90, 98, 646, 657, 805; Alameda County East Oakland Shuttle; Harbor Bay Business Park Shuttle

Construction
- Parking: 35 spaces (Amtrak); 847 spaces (BART)
- Cycle facilities: 18 lockers and racks
- Accessible: Yes
- Architect: Neil Smith, Reynolds & Chamberlain (BART)

Other information
- Station code: BART: COLS; Amtrak: OAC

History
- Opened: September 11, 1972 (BART); June 6, 2005 (Amtrak)
- Rebuilt: November 22, 2014 (Airport connector opened)
- Former names: Coliseum (1972–1977); Coliseum/Oakland Airport (1977–2014)

Passengers
- 2025: 2,675 (weekday average) (BART)
- FY 2025: 24,284 annually (Amtrak)
Services
Preceding station	Amtrak	Following station
Hayward toward San Jose	Capitol Corridor	Oakland–Jack London Square toward Auburn
Coast Starlight does not stop here
Preceding station	Bay Area Rapid Transit	Following station
Fruitvale toward Daly City	Blue Line	San Leandro toward Dublin/Pleasanton
Fruitvale toward Daly City	Green Line	San Leandro toward Berryessa
Fruitvale toward Richmond	Orange Line	San Leandro toward Berryessa
Oakland International Airport Terminus	Oakland Airport Connector	Terminus
Track layout
Key
Location

The station complex of Amtrak's Oakland Coliseum station and Bay Area Rapid Transit (BART)'s Coliseum station is located in the East Oakland area of Oakland, California, United States. The two stations, located about 600 feet (180 m) apart, are connected to each other and to the Oakland Coliseum/Oakland Arena sports complex with an accessible pedestrian bridge. The BART station is served by the Orange, Green, and Blue lines; the Amtrak station is served by the Capitol Corridor service.

The BART station opened in 1972, serving the six-year-old Oakland Coliseum and surrounding neighborhood. The Amtrak platform was added in 2005, making it one of two transfer points between BART and Amtrak. In 2014, the complex became the terminus of the Oakland Airport Connector, providing a rail connection to Oakland San Francisco Bay Airport. The station also serves as a transfer point for AC Transit buses and business park shuttles.

== Station layout ==
=== BART station ===
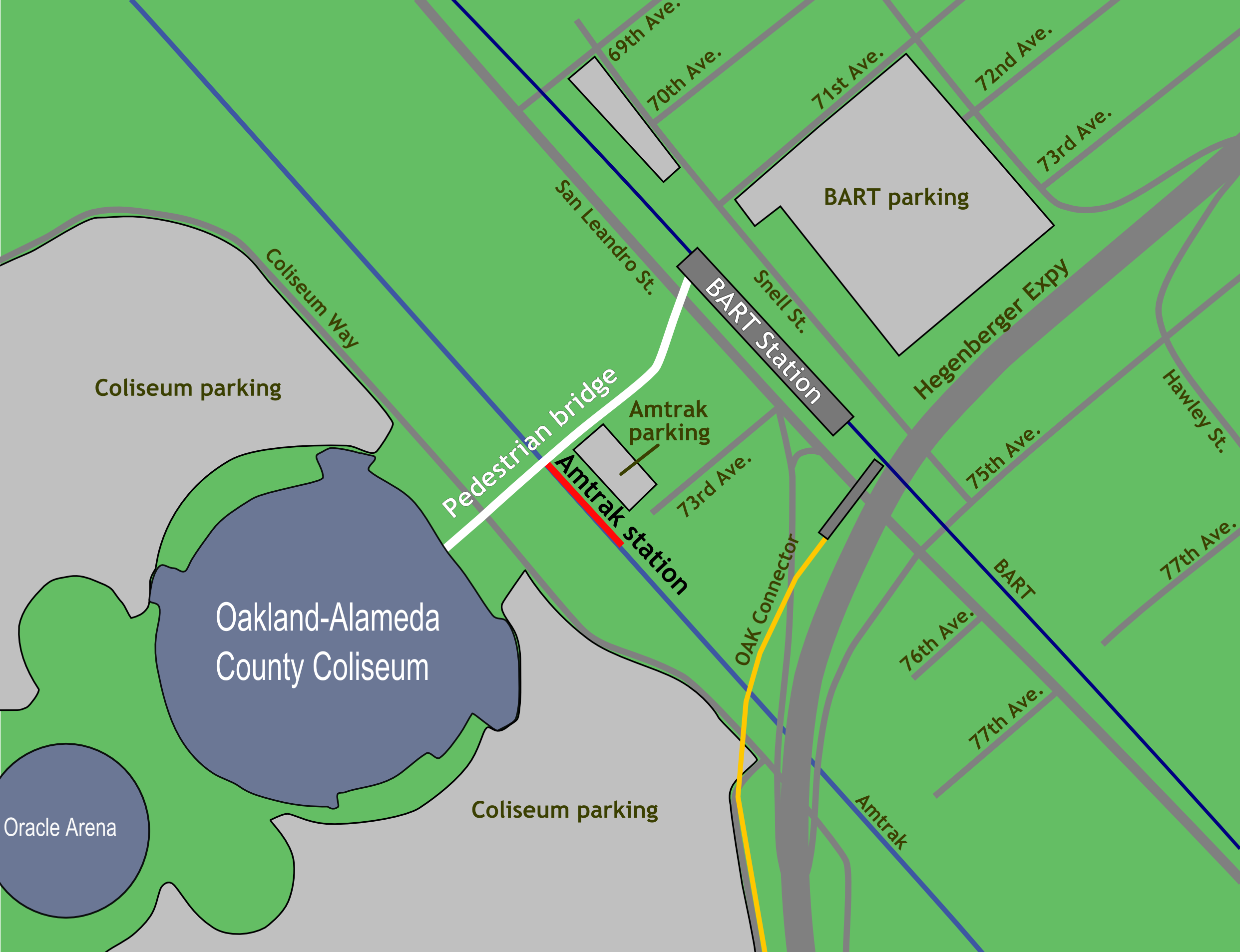
Map of the station complex and surrounding area (see detailed diagram)

The BART station is an elevated three-level structure. Fare control and concessions are located on the ground level, east of San Leandro Street, underneath the northern end of the platform. Conventional BART trains serve an island platform on the elevated second level. The grade-level Union Pacific Railroad (UP) Oakland Subdivision runs parallel to BART on the east side of the station, separating it from the adjacent Coliseum neighborhood. An accessible pedestrian underpass tunnel with a stairlift runs underneath the Union Pacific right-of-way and connects the fare control area with the parking area and Snell Street. A taxi stand is located along the western side of San Leandro Street just north of 71st Avenue, with a secondary taxi loading zone also located along the eastern side of Snell Street near the bicycle locker area. A 950-foot (290 m) pedestrian bridge between the BART station and the Coliseum sports complex crosses over San Leandro Street and the UP Niles Subdivision tracks.

The Beige Line station is located on the third level of the Oakland Coliseum station complex. It has one track serving one side platform. It has no direct non-emergency street access and can only be reached from the main BART platform. Unlike conventional BART stations, platform screen doors provide a barrier between the platform and the guideway of the driverless system. The fare for the line is charged at Coliseum station for travel in both directions. The walls of the platform area feature an artwork titled A-Round Oakland by Gordon Huether. The $300,000 artwork consists of around 50 colorful dichroic glass circles ranging from 18–36 inches (460–910 mm) in diameter.

=== Amtrak station ===
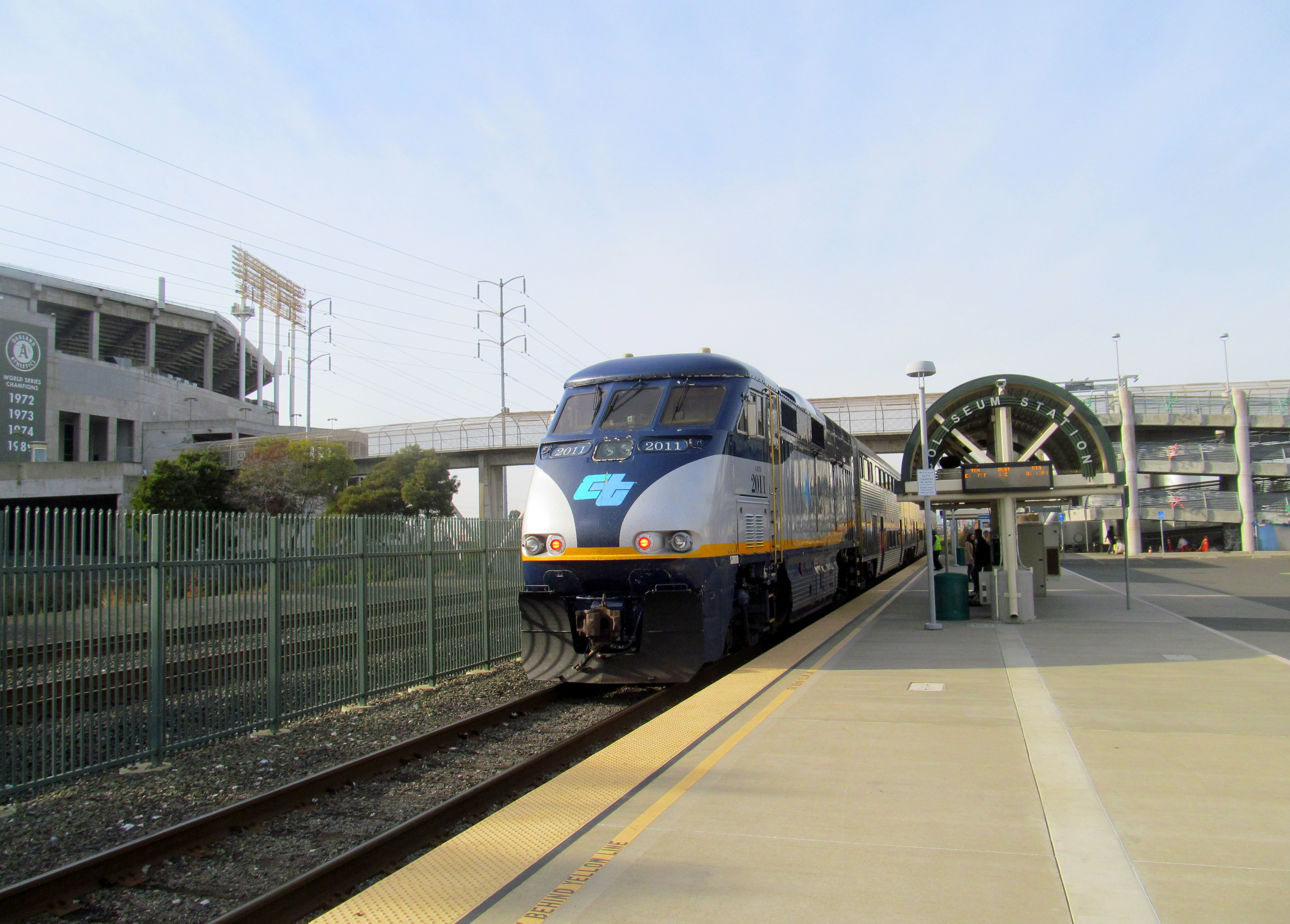
A Capitol Corridor train at Oakland Coliseum in November 2017

The Amtrak station is an unstaffed grade-level station located at the western end of the 73rd Avenue cul-de-sac. The station has few amenities other than benches sheltered by open-air canopies. A QuikTrak ticket machine that was previously located at the station was removed due to vandalism issues. The UP Niles Subdivision has three tracks at the station — two mainline tracks used by Union Pacific freight trains (and the Coast Starlight), and a siding track with a single side platform on the northeast side serving Capitol Corridor trains. Oakland Coliseum is primarily served by through trains between Sacramento and San Jose, but also functions as a terminal for some Capitol Corridor service traveling to/from Sacramento. An accessible ramp structure connects the platform to the pedestrian bridge. An artwork entitled Bottom of the Ninth, created by Horace Washington, is located on the ramp structure. It consists of 13 colored metal figures.

=== Bus service ===
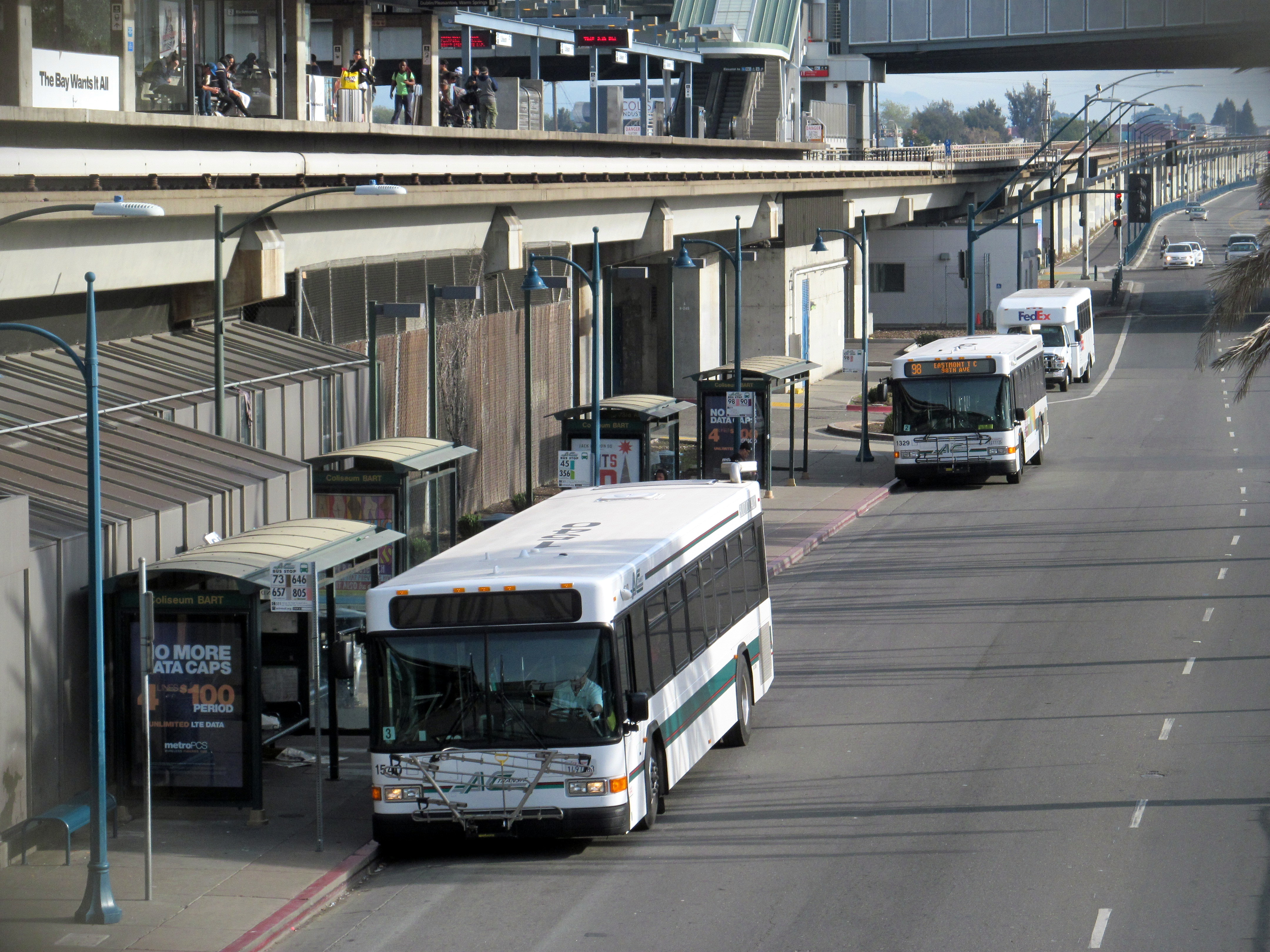
AC Transit buses at the station in 2017

Coliseum station is one of the main bus-rail interchanges for East Oakland (along with Fruitvale station) and is served 24/7 by various bus services. It is served by eight AC Transit bus routes, which stop on both sides of San Leandro Street:

- Local routes 45, 73, 90, and 98
- All Nighter route 805
- Limited-stop route 46L
- School routes 646 and 657

In addition, several fare-free local shuttle routes stop at the BART passenger loading zone on the southeastern corner of San Leandro Street and 71st Avenue. These include the Alameda County East Oakland Shuttle, which connects the station with county offices at Eastmont Town Center, Edgewater Drive, and Enterprise Way, as well as shuttle buses serving the nearby Harbor Bay Business Park.

== History ==
=== BART ===
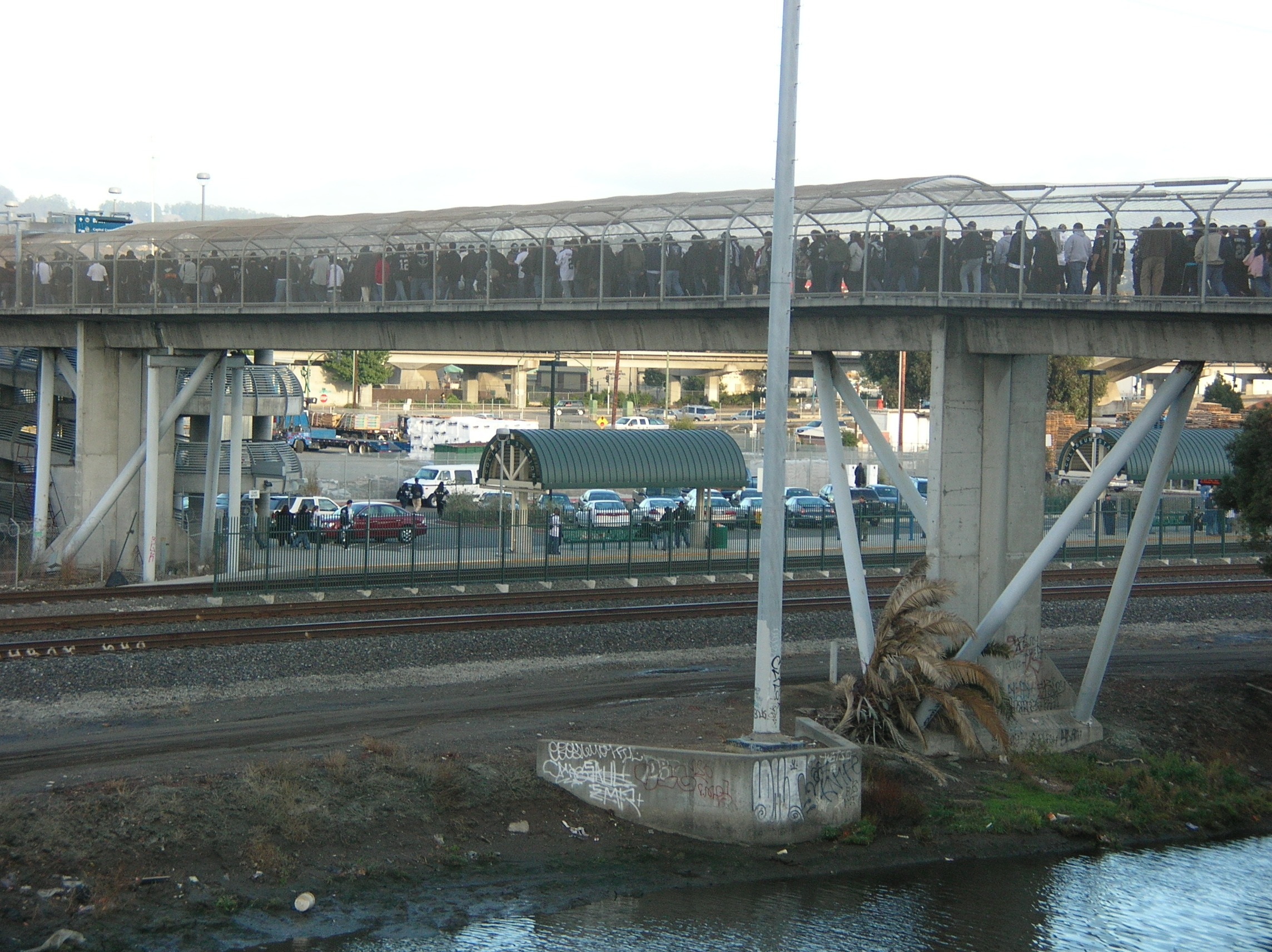
The 1974-completed footbridge

Original plans in 1960 for the BART system called for a station at 77th Avenue. Around 1963, the planned station was relocated slightly north to 73rd Avenue to better serve the Oakland–Alameda County Coliseum/Coliseum Arena sports complex, which opened in 1966. By August 1965, the city's preferred name for the station was "Coliseum–73rd Ave". In October 1965, a BART committee suggested the simpler Coliseum, which was approved that December. By 1965, BART and Alameda County disagreed on who was responsible for providing access between the station and the sports complex. A footbridge connecting the two was planned by 1967, though financing had not been arranged.

BART awarded a $1.13 million contract in June 1968 for construction of the station. While funding was not yet available for the walkway, the station design was futureproofed to permit its later addition. BART agreed in September 1971 to contribute funds towards a footbridge; the Coliseum management similarly agreed that November. Design work began in mid-1972. BART would contribute $125,000 of the expected $1.5 million cost of the bridge; the Coliseum would add $375,000 and the federal government $1 million. The project also included an elevator between the fare lobby and platform, which was not included in the initial station construction. The station opened as part of the first segment of the BART system (MacArthur–Fremont) on September 11, 1972.

Construction of the elevator began in February 1973. The BART Board approved the footbridge plans and advertised the project for bidding in May 1973. By mid-1974, construction was 80% complete. The footbridge initially opened on October 5, 1974 for the American League playoffs and 1974 World Series. However, it was closed on October 18, after the conclusion of the World Series, due to excessive swaying. BART approved funding for design work to strengthen the bridge in November 1974, and issued a construction contract in July 1975 to add additional bracing.

The footbridge reopened in October 1975 — just in time for the single American League Championship Series game played at the Coliseum on October 7. In January 1976, an arbitration panel ordered the firm of Skidmore, Owings & Merrill, which had designed the footbridge, to pay $44,131 of the $64,000 cost to strengthen the bridge. BART paid the remainder. AirBART bus service connecting the station with Oakland International Airport began on July 1, 1977. The station was renamed Coliseum/Oakland Airport to reflect the new airport connection. Around 1978, the footbridge was retrofitted with higher fencing because Coliseum attendees had been throwing objects onto businesses below.

=== Amtrak ===
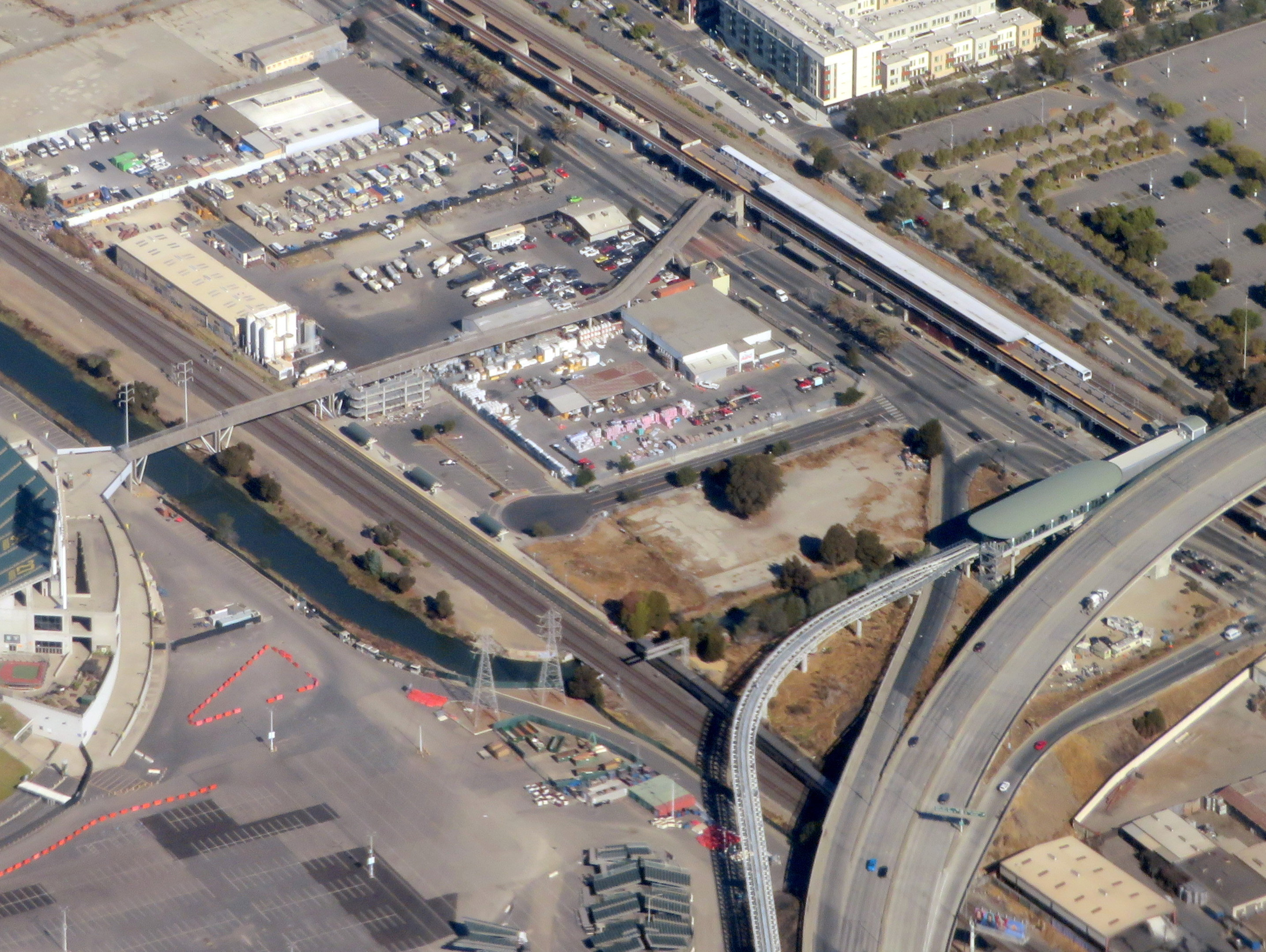
Aerial view of the station complex

The Southern Pacific Railroad (SP) opened a station at Fitchburg (near 77th Avenue) on September 13, 1891, to serve a new housing development there. It was served by local trains, including Oakland–Hayward local trains added in 1895. A freight station was present at Kohler (near 66th Avenue) by 1899. During the 1900s, Fitchburg was primarily a flag stop on local trains running between Oakland and Niles, San Jose, or Livermore; Kohler was only used for freight. On October 11, 1909, the SP opened its Stonehurst Branch, which split from the SP mainline at Elmhurst. The SP operated peak-hour Oakland–Stonehurst local trains; flag stops at Kohler and Fitchburg were among the intermediate stops. Other local trains continued to serve Fitchburg, but ceased stopping there between 1912 and 1914. On August 28, 1921, Stonehurst service was reduced to one daily round trip, with Kohler and Fitchburg closed. Other passenger services continued to use the mainline until 1960, but did not stop at Kohler or Fitchburg.

Amtrak took over most remaining intercity passenger service, including SP trains, in 1971. The long-distance Coast Starlight began using the SP line between Oakland and San Jose. It served only the main downtown stops in Oakland: 16th Street station until 1994, then Oakland–Jack London Square station from 1995 on. Capitols (later Capitol Corridor) service began in 1991; Oakland Coliseum was among the stations proposed in 1990 for the new service. In July 1994, the California Transportation Commission withdrew $2.1 million that it had previously allocated to the Oakland Coliseum station project. The commission cited increasing costs and disputes between Caltrans and the SP (which was taken over by the Union Pacific Railroad in 1997). For the 1999–2001 seasons, Amtrak operated Thruway buses between Jack London Square and the Coliseum for Oakland Raiders home games.

In March 2002, the California Transportation Commission approved over $4 million in funds for an Oakland Coliseum station. Other funding came from the Oakland Redevelopment Agency, Caltrans, the Capitol Corridor Joint Powers Authority, and the Alameda County Congestion Management Agency. The station became part of a $88 million construction package, announced in September 2002, to increase Capitol Corridor frequency between Oakland and San Jose. It was constructed on land formerly used for railroad purposes and auto scrap yards, necessitating decontamination before construction could begin. Construction of the station began in September 2003, with completion then estimated in spring 2004. Oakland Coliseum station ultimately opened on June 6, 2005, at a cost of $6.6 million. It included an accessible connection to the footbridge, allowing a grade separated transfer between the Capitol Corridor and BART. A $2.5 million reconstruction of the platform for accessibility took place in 2021.

=== Oakland Airport Connector ===
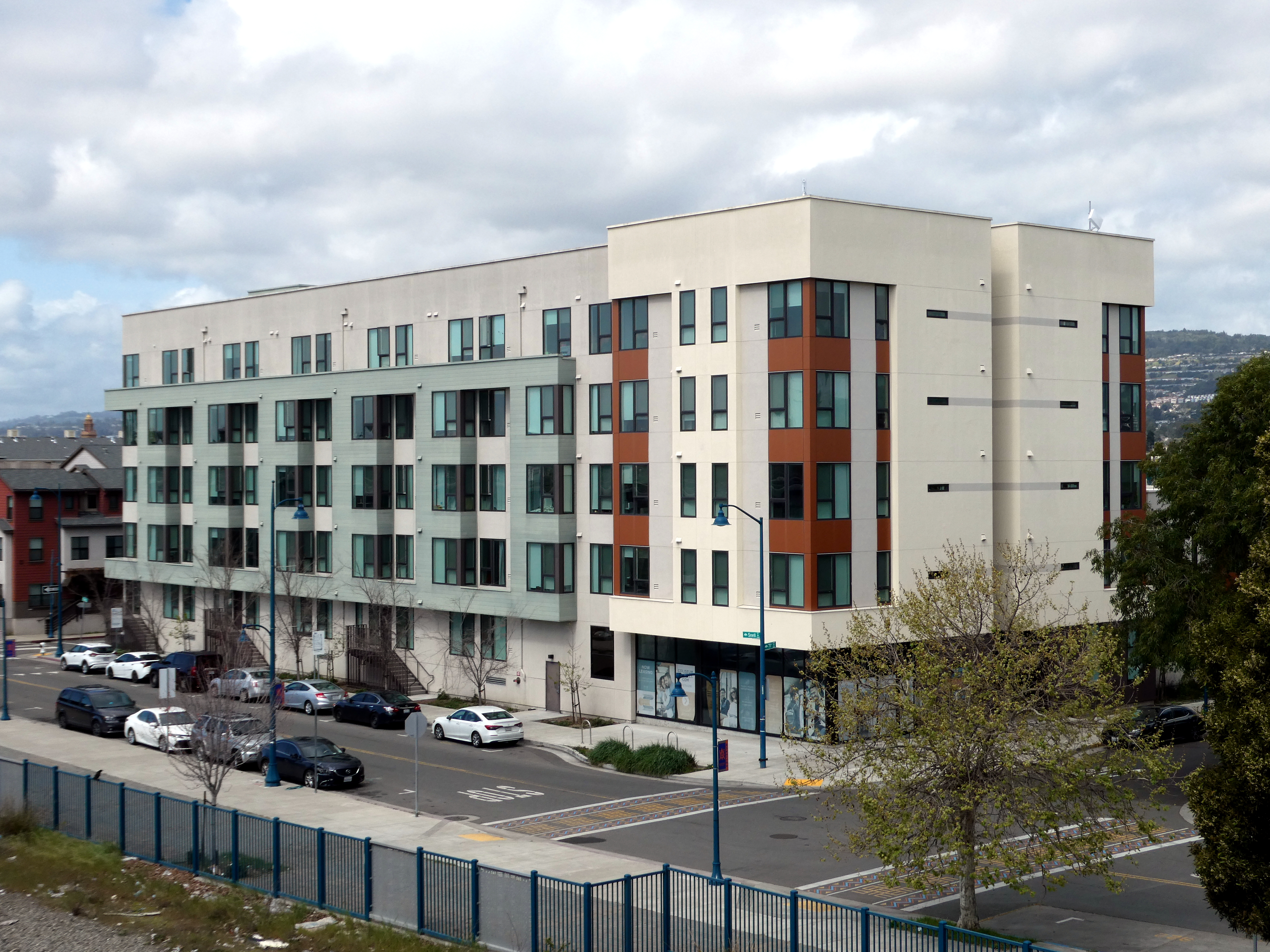
The Coliseum Connections building in 2025

BART considered plans for a rail link to Oakland International Airport as early as 1970, including a bi-directional loop off the main line, but no significant progress was made until the early 1990s. In 2009, the Oakland City Council approved the construction of the Oakland Airport Connector, a 3.2-mile (5.1 km) automated guideway transit line. Construction on the line began in October 2010; it was renamed the Coliseum-Oakland International Airport line by BART. The line's Coliseum station opened on November 21, 2014, along with the rest of the line. AirBART bus service between the station and the airport was discontinued. The name of the conventional BART station was changed back to Coliseum, allowing the terminus station at the airport to be named as Oakland International Airport station.

In the early 2000s, planning began for transit-oriented development (TOD) to replace a station parking lot. The Coliseum Connections project, a modular structure with 110 mixed-income units on a 1.3-acre (0.53 ha) site, was constructed from November 2017 to April 4, 2019. The developers of the project lease the site from BART. As of 2024, BART anticipates soliciting a developer between 2029 and 2033 for a second phase of TOD. In August 2020, a mural by seven Oakland Unified School District students was completed in the pedestrian tunnel.

Thirteen BART stations, including Coliseum, did not originally have faregates for passengers using the elevator. In 2020, BART started a project to add faregates to elevators at these stations. The new faregate in the BART lobby at Coliseum was installed in August 2020. BART installed second-generation fare gates for the Oakland Airport Connector from September 15–20, 2024, and for the main station from October 27 to November 1. The wheelchair lifts in the pedestrian tunnel were removed from service in 2024. As of December 2024, replacements are expected to be completed in May 2025.
