= List of Bay Area Rapid Transit stations =

Bay Area Rapid Transit (BART) is a heavy rail rapid transit system in the San Francisco Bay Area in California, United States. With average weekday ridership around 213,000 passengers in August 2026, BART is the seventh busiest rapid transit system in the United States. BART is administered by the Bay Area Rapid Transit District, a special district government agency formed by Alameda, Contra Costa, and San Francisco counties.

BART has 50 stations: 19 on the surface, 15 elevated, and 16 underground (i.e. subway). 22 stations are in Alameda County, 12 are in Contra Costa, and 8 are in San Francisco. 6 stations are in San Mateo County and 2 are in Santa Clara County; those counties are not part of the BART special district, but contribute to operations funding. As of August 2026, Montgomery Street has the highest ridership and Oakland International Airport has the lowest. Every day before 9 pm, BART trains run on five principal routes; four are transbay routes connecting San Francisco to Oakland and various destinations in the East Bay, while the Orange Line runs exclusively in the East Bay. The Green and Red lines do not run after 9 pm, but all stations remain accessible by transfers via other routes.

BART's first route between Fremont and MacArthur, the Orange Line, opened in September 1972; it was extended to Richmond in January 1973. Service began between Concord and MacArthur on the Yellow Line in May 1973, and between Montgomery Street and Daly City in November 1973. The original system was completed in September 1974 when the underwater Transbay Tube and West Oakland opened. BART's three routes then were the Orange, Yellow, and Green lines. Embarcadero opened as an infill station in 1976, and direct Richmond–Daly City service began operating that year.

The Yellow Line was extended to North Concord/Martinez in 1995, and to Colma and Pittsburg/Bay Point in 1996. BART's fifth route, the Blue Line, began service with a new branch to Dublin/Pleasanton in 1997. The San Mateo County line was extended south from Colma to San Francisco International Airport and Millbrae in 2003. A second infill station, West Dublin/Pleasanton, opened in 2011. The automated guideway transit (AGT) Oakland Airport Connector opened in 2014 to serve Oakland International Airport. BART service was extended south from Fremont to Warm Springs/South Fremont in 2017, then to Berryessa/North San José in 2020. A diesel multiple unit feeder service, eBART, opened from Pittsburg/Bay Point to Antioch in 2018. Several additional stations, including a subway through San Jose to Santa Clara, are planned or proposed.

== Services ==
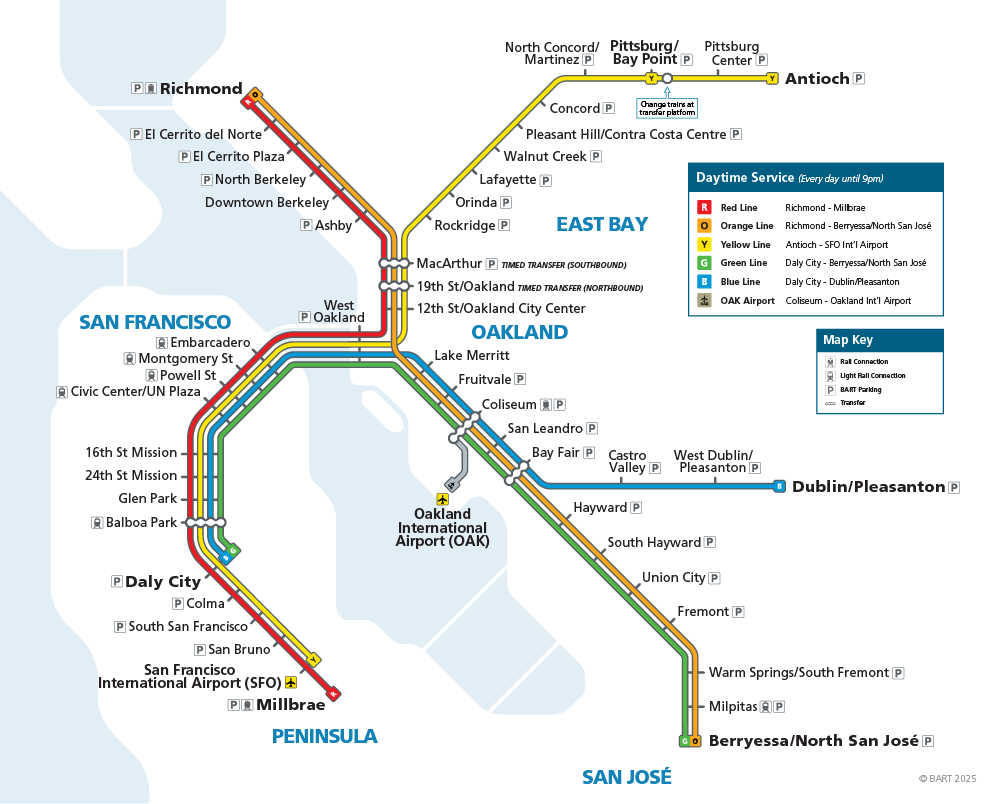
BART daytime service map

BART operates five named and interlined heavy rail services plus one separate automated guideway line. All of the heavy rail services run through Oakland, and all but the Orange Line run through the Transbay Tube to San Francisco. All five services run until 9 pm; only three services operate evenings after 9 pm, as well as some Sundays during maintenance work. All stations are served during all service hours. The eastern segment of the Yellow Line, between Antioch and the transfer platform east of Pittsburg/Bay Point, uses different rolling stock and is separated from the rest of the line.

Unlike most other rapid transit and rail systems around the world, BART lines were not primarily referred to by shorthand designations or their color names (although the colors used on maps have been constant since 1980). The services were mainly identified on maps, schedules, and station signage by the names of their termini. However, the new fleet displays line colors more prominently, and BART has begun to use color names in press releases and GTFS data. In 2022, BART formally announced on Twitter they were using colors on the line map and officially.

	Route name	First service	Termini		Service times
Orange Line (BART)	Orange Line	September 11, 1972	Berryessa	Richmond	Operates during all service hours.
Yellow Line (BART)	Yellow Line	May 21, 1973	San Francisco International Airport or Millbrae (after 9pm)	Antioch	Operates during all service hours. Daytime service terminates at SFO, while evening (after 9 pm) service terminates at Millbrae.
Green Line (BART)	Green Line	November 16, 1974	Daly City	Berryessa	No evening (after 9 pm) service.
Red Line (BART)	Red Line	April 19, 1976	Millbrae	Richmond	No evening (after 9 pm) service.
Blue Line (BART)	Blue Line	May 10, 1997	Daly City	Dublin/Pleasanton	Operates during all service hours.
	Oakland Airport Connector	November 22, 2014	Oakland International Airport	Coliseum	Operates during all service hours.

== Stations ==
BART has 50 passenger stations, of which 47 are high-platform rapid transit stations. Oakland International Airport is served by the Oakland Airport Connector, which uses cable-hauled automated guideway transit (AGT) rolling stock; Coliseum has separate platforms for rapid transit trains and AGT trains. Antioch and Pittsburg Center have low platforms for use with the diesel multiple unit (DMU) trains used on that section of the line. A transfer platform east of Pittsburg/Bay Point, which does not have street access and is not designated as a unique station, provides cross-platform transfers between the rapid transit and DMU sections of the line.

Seven stations are designated as transfer points between services; timed cross-platform transfers are available between the Orange and Yellow lines at MacArthur (southbound) and 19th Street Oakland (northbound). Nine stations are the terminal of one or more services; Coliseum is also a transfer station. Ten stations have connections available to other rail services – Amtrak, Caltrain, Muni Metro, and VTA light rail. All stations are served during all operating hours.

^	Transfer stations within the BART system
^†	Transfer stations that are also line termini
†	Line termini
Transfer to other system	Stations with connections to other rail systems

Station	Image	Line(s)	Connections	Location	Opened	Ridership	Parking spaces
12th Street Oakland City Center	A Richmond-bound train at 12th Street Oakland City Center station, 2018	Orange Line; Red Line; Yellow Line	Tempo	Oakland	September 11, 1972	6,103	0
16th Street Mission	The platform at 16th Street Mission station, 2017	Blue Line; Green Line; Red Line; Yellow Line	—N/a	San Francisco	November 5, 1973	6,741	0
19th Street Oakland ^	The upper platform at 19th Street Oakland station, 2018	Orange Line; Red Line; Yellow Line	Tempo	Oakland	September 11, 1972	6,035	0
24th Street Mission	The platform at 24th Street Mission station, 2019	Blue Line; Green Line; Red Line; Yellow Line	—N/a	San Francisco	November 5, 1973	6,501	0
Antioch †	Antioch station on the first day of eBART service, May 2018	Yellow Line †	—N/a	Antioch	May 26, 2018	2,033	1,012
Ashby	The Ashby station platform viewed from the mezzanine level, 2018	Orange Line; Red Line	—N/a	Berkeley	January 29, 1973	2,506	715
Balboa Park ^	A southbound train at Balboa Park station, 2019	Blue Line; Green Line; Red Line; Yellow Line	Muni Metro:	San Francisco	November 5, 1973	4,948	0
Bay Fair ^	A San Francisco/Daly City-bound train at Bay Fair station, 2017	Blue Line; Green Line; Orange Line	—N/a	San Leandro	September 11, 1972	3,019	1,641
Downtown Berkeley	The mezzanine level of Downtown Berkeley station, 2018	Orange Line; Red Line	—N/a	Berkeley	January 29, 1973	7,302	0
Berryessa †	Berryessa/North San José station viewed from the parking garage on the first day of service, June 2020	Green Line †; Orange Line †	—N/a	San José	June 13, 2020	2,019	1,527
Castro Valley	An eastbound train at Castro Valley station, 2018	Blue Line	—N/a	Castro Valley	May 10, 1997	1,500	1,123
Civic Center/UN Plaza	A train at Civic Center/UN Plaza station, 2018	Blue Line; Green Line; Red Line; Yellow Line	Muni Metro: (at surface stops)	San Francisco	November 5, 1973	12,339	0
Coliseum †	The platforms at Coliseum station, 2017	Oakland Airport Connector †; Blue Line; Green Line; Orange Line	Amtrak: Capitol Corridor	Oakland	September 11, 1972	2,912	847
Colma	A southbound train at Colma station, 2018	Red Line; Yellow Line	—N/a	Colma	February 24, 1996	1,940	2,238
Concord	A northbound train leaving Concord station, 2020	Yellow Line	—N/a	Concord	May 21, 1973	3,100	2,367
Daly City †	Daly City station viewed from the footbridge at the north end of the platforms, 2018	Blue Line †; Green Line †; Red Line; Yellow Line	—N/a	Daly City	November 5, 1973	5,626	2,068
Dublin/Pleasanton †	Dublin/Pleasanton station viewed from the parking garage, 2018	Blue Line †	—N/a	Dublin/Pleasanton	May 10, 1997	3,913	2,927
El Cerrito del Norte	Side view of El Cerrito del Norte station, March 2021	Orange Line; Red Line	—N/a	El Cerrito	January 29, 1973	4,334	2,198
El Cerrito Plaza	The platforms at El Cerrito Plaza station, 2017	Orange Line; Red Line	—N/a	El Cerrito	January 29, 1973	2,416	761
Embarcadero	A train at Embarcadero station, 2018	Blue Line; Green Line; Red Line; Yellow Line	Muni Metro: (at surface stops)	San Francisco	May 27, 1976	20,629	0
Fremont	A southbound train at Fremont station, 2017	Green Line; Orange Line	—N/a	Fremont	September 11, 1972	2,568	2,030
Fruitvale	Buses and a train at Fruitvale station, 2018	Blue Line; Green Line; Orange Line	—N/a	Oakland	September 11, 1972	4,484	1,268
Glen Park	The platform level of Glen Park station, 2018	Blue Line; Green Line; Red Line; Yellow Line	Muni Metro: (at San Jose/Glen Park)	San Francisco	November 5, 1973	3,778	53
Hayward	Hayward station and adjacent freight tracks, 2018	Green Line; Orange Line	—N/a	Hayward	September 11, 1972	2,632	1,473
Lafayette	An eastbound train at Lafayette station, 2018	Yellow Line	—N/a	Lafayette	May 21, 1973	2,181	1,629
Lake Merritt	A train at Lake Merritt station, 2019	Blue Line; Green Line; Orange Line	—N/a	Oakland	September 11, 1972	3,217	207
MacArthur ^	MacArthur station, 2019	Orange Line; Red Line; Yellow Line	—N/a	Oakland	September 11, 1972	4,843	602
Millbrae †	Trains at Millbrae station, 2018	Red Line; Yellow Line †	Caltrain	Millbrae	June 22, 2003	2,518	2,900
Milpitas	A northbound train at Milpitas station on the first day of service, June 2020	Green Line; Orange Line	VTA light rail:	Milpitas	June 13, 2020	1,861	1,631
Montgomery Street	A train at Montgomery station, 2017	Blue Line; Green Line; Red Line; Yellow Line	Muni Metro: (at surface stops)	San Francisco	November 5, 1973	16,808	0
North Berkeley	The circular headhouse of North Berkeley station, 2018	Orange Line; Red Line	—N/a	Berkeley	January 29, 1973	2,252	822
North Concord/Martinez	A southbound train at North Concord/Martinez station, 2018	Yellow Line	—N/a	Concord	December 16, 1995	842	1,977
Oakland International Airport †	The exterior of Oakland International Airport station, 2018	Oakland Airport Connector †	OAK	Oakland	November 22, 2014	592	0
Orinda	Two trains at Orinda station, 2018	Yellow Line	—N/a	Orinda	May 21, 1973	1,728	1,406
Pittsburg/Bay Point †	A train at Pittsburg/Bay Point station, 2018	Yellow Line	—N/a	Pittsburg	December 7, 1996	2,674	1,992
Pittsburg Center	A train at Pittsburg Center station, 2018	Yellow Line	—N/a	Pittsburg	May 26, 2018	511	262
Pleasant Hill/Contra Costa Centre	Pleasant Hill station, 2018	Yellow Line	—N/a	Walnut Creek	May 21, 1973	3,140	3,011
Powell Street	A train at Powell Street station, 2019	Blue Line; Green Line; Red Line; Yellow Line	Muni Metro: (at surface stops) (at Union Square/Market Street)	San Francisco	November 5, 1973	14,197	0
Richmond †	The main entrance to Richmond station	Orange Line †; Red Line †	Amtrak: California Zephyr, Capitol Corridor, Gold Runner	Richmond	January 29, 1973	2,923	624
Rockridge	A train at Rockridge station, 2019	Yellow Line	—N/a	Oakland	May 21, 1973	3,442	903
San Bruno	The platform at San Bruno station, 2015	Red Line; Yellow Line	—N/a	San Bruno	June 22, 2003	1,837	1,083
San Francisco International Airport †	A train at San Francisco International Airport station, 2020	Yellow Line †; Red Line †	SFO; AirTrain	San Mateo County	June 22, 2003	6,449	0
San Leandro	A train at San Leandro station, 2018	Blue Line; Green Line; Orange Line	Tempo	San Leandro	September 11, 1972	3,914	1,224
South Hayward	The platforms at South Hayward station, 2018	Green Line; Orange Line	—N/a	Hayward	September 11, 1972	1,733	1,207
South San Francisco	The platform at South San Francisco station, 2018	Red Line; Yellow Line	—N/a	South San Francisco	June 22, 2003	1,720	3,500
Union City	The platforms at Union City station, 2017	Green Line; Orange Line	—N/a	Union City	September 11, 1972	2,351	1,197
Walnut Creek	A view of Walnut Creek station from the south garage, 2019	Yellow Line	—N/a	Walnut Creek	May 21, 1973	3,554	2,089
Warm Springs/South Fremont	A train at Warm Springs/South Fremont station, 2017	Green Line; Orange Line	—N/a	Fremont	March 25, 2017	1,622	2,082
West Dublin/Pleasanton	The platform at West Dublin/Pleasanton station, 2011	Blue Line	—N/a	Dublin/Pleasanton	February 19, 2011	1,623	1,190
West Oakland	A train at West Oakland station, 2018	Blue Line; Green Line; Red Line; Yellow Line	—N/a	Oakland	September 16, 1974	4,806	156

== Future stations ==
Map of the Silicon Valley extension

The four-station Phase II of the Silicon Valley BART extension will add underground stations at 28th Street/Little Portugal, Downtown San José, and Diridon in San José, plus the surface-level Santa Clara station; it is planned to open in 2036. An infill station on the Warm Springs extension at Irvington is planned to open in 2031. Two additional infill stations–the surface-level Calaveras on the Silicon Valley extension and the elevated Doolittle on the Oakland Airport Connector–are proposed but not yet funded or scheduled. Several of these future stations connect with other rail services in the South Bay region, including Altamont Corridor Express, which does not yet have a connection with BART.

Station	Line(s)	Connections	Location	Planned opening
Irvington	Green Line; Orange Line	—N/a	Fremont	2031
28th Street/Little Portugal	Green Line; Orange Line	—N/a	San José	2036
Downtown San José	Green Line; Orange Line	VTA light rail: (at Santa Clara)	San José	2036
Diridon	Green Line; Orange Line	Amtrak: Coast Starlight, Capitol Corridor; Caltrain; Altamont Corridor Express; VTA light rail: California High-Speed Rail	San José	2036
Santa Clara †	Green Line †; Orange Line †	Amtrak: Capitol Corridor; Caltrain; Altamont Corridor Express	Santa Clara	2036
Doolittle	Oakland Airport Connector	—N/a	Oakland	
Calaveras	Green Line; Orange Line	—N/a	Milpitas	
