= Bay Fair station =

Metro station in San Leandro, California, US

Bay Fair
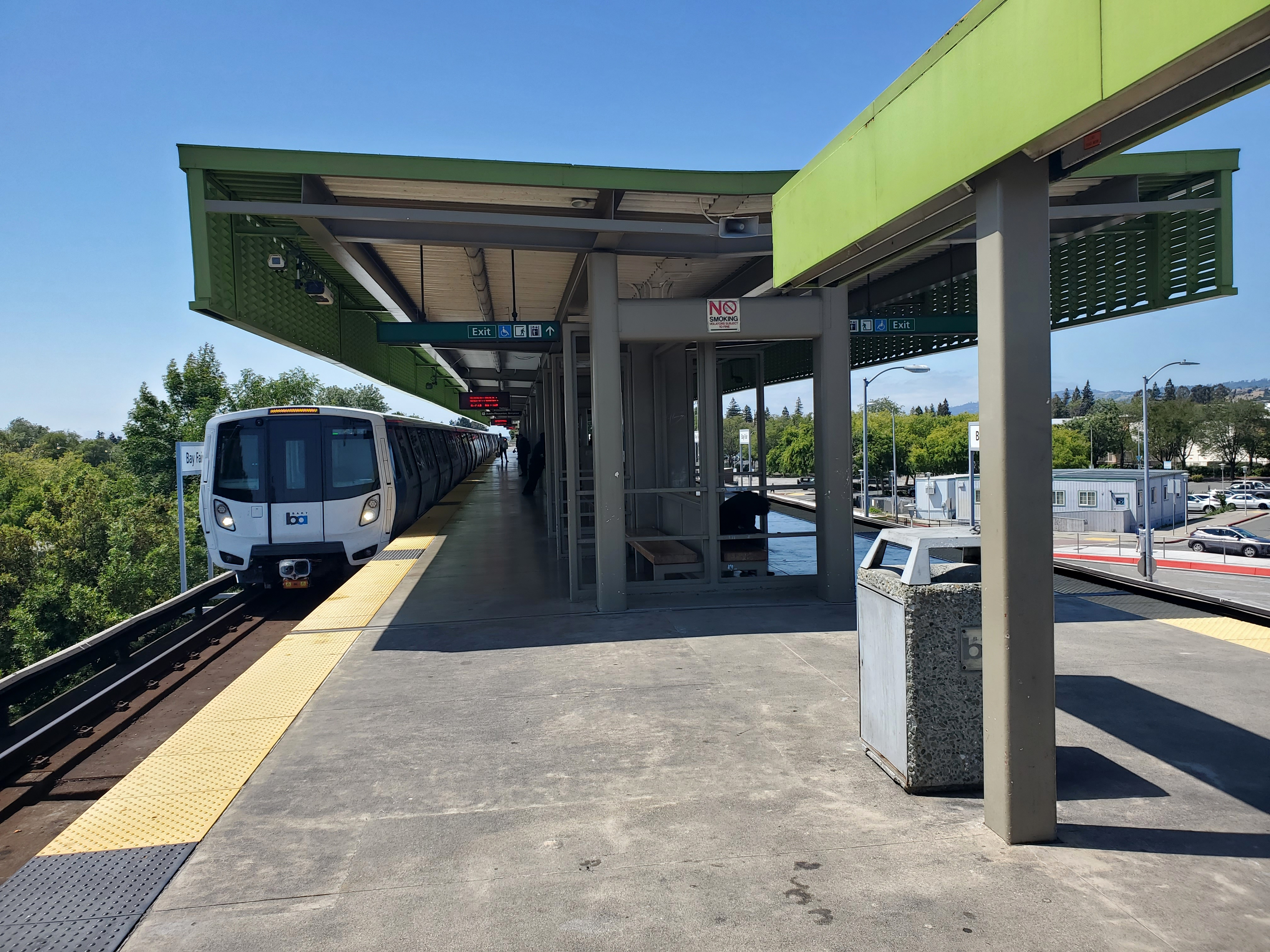
- A southbound train at Bay Fair station in 2024

General information
- Location: 15242 Hesperian Boulevard; San Leandro, California
- Coordinates: 37.697°N 122.1265°W
- Owner: San Francisco Bay Area Rapid Transit District
- Line: BART A-Line
- Platforms: 1 island platform
- Tracks: 2
- Connections: AC Transit: 9, 28, 35, 40, 93, 97, 706, 801

Construction
- Structure type: Elevated
- Parking: 1,641 spaces
- Cycle facilities: Racks, 40 lockers
- Accessible: Yes
- Architect: Gwathmey, Sellier & Crosby; Joseph Esherick & Associates

Other information
- Station code: BART: BAYF

History
- Opened: September 11, 1972

Passengers
- 2025: 2,794 (weekday average)

Services
Preceding station	Bay Area Rapid Transit	Following station
San Leandro toward Daly City	Blue Line	Castro Valley toward Dublin/Pleasanton
San Leandro toward Daly City	Green Line	Hayward toward Berryessa
San Leandro toward Richmond	Orange Line	Hayward toward Berryessa
Location

Bay Fair station is a Bay Area Rapid Transit (BART) station located adjacent to the Bayfair Center mall in San Leandro, California. The station is served by the Orange, Green, and Blue lines. Service through the station is timed for cross-platform transfers between the Blue and Orange lines.

Bay Fair station has a single elevated island platform serving the line's two tracks. A pedestrian tunnel under the Union Pacific Railroad Oakland Subdivision tracks connects the fare lobby to parking areas south of the station. An AC Transit bus transfer area and additional parking are located on the north side of the station.

== History ==
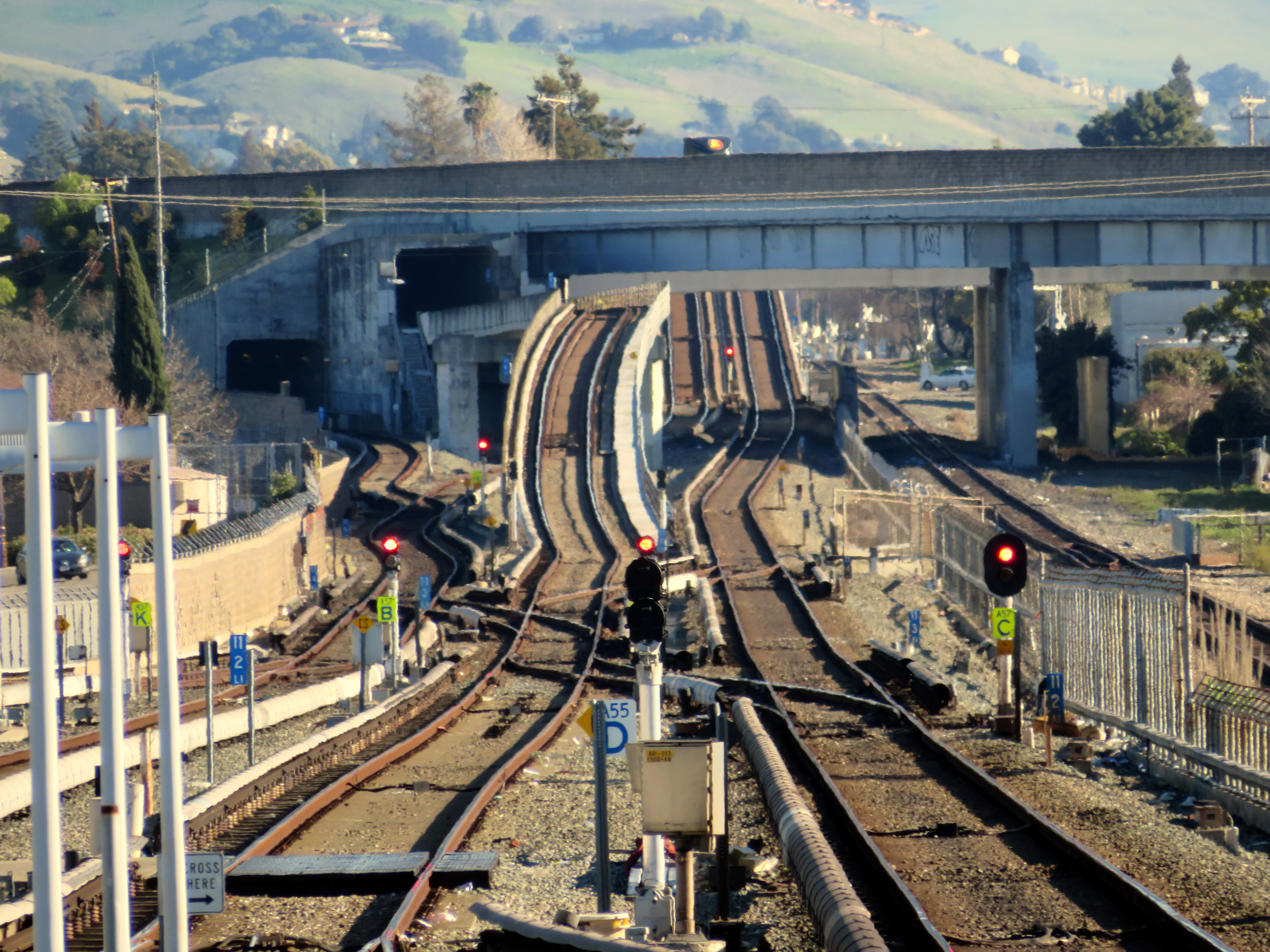
The 1997-built junction south of Bay Fair

The BART Board approved the name "Bay Fair" in December 1965. The station opened on September 11, 1972, as part of the initial BART operating segment. Due to a national strike that year by elevator constructors, elevator construction on the early stations was delayed. Elevators at most of the initial stations, including Bay Fair, were completed in the months following the opening. It became a transfer station on May 10, 1997, with the opening of the branch to Dublin/Pleasanton; a flying junction was built south of the station.

Thirteen BART stations, including Bay Fair, did not originally have faregates for passengers using the elevator. In 2020, BART started a project to add faregates to elevators at these stations. The new faregate on the platform at Bay Fair was installed in July 2021. On August 10, 2026, BART adjusted train schedules to allow cross-platform transfers between the Blue and Orange lines at Bay Fair, enabling trips between the Tri-Valley and the San Jose area.

As of 2024, BART anticipates soliciting a developer by 2028 for transit-oriented development to replace surface parking lots at the station.
