= Castro Valley station =

Rapid transit station in San Francisco Bay Area

Castro Valley
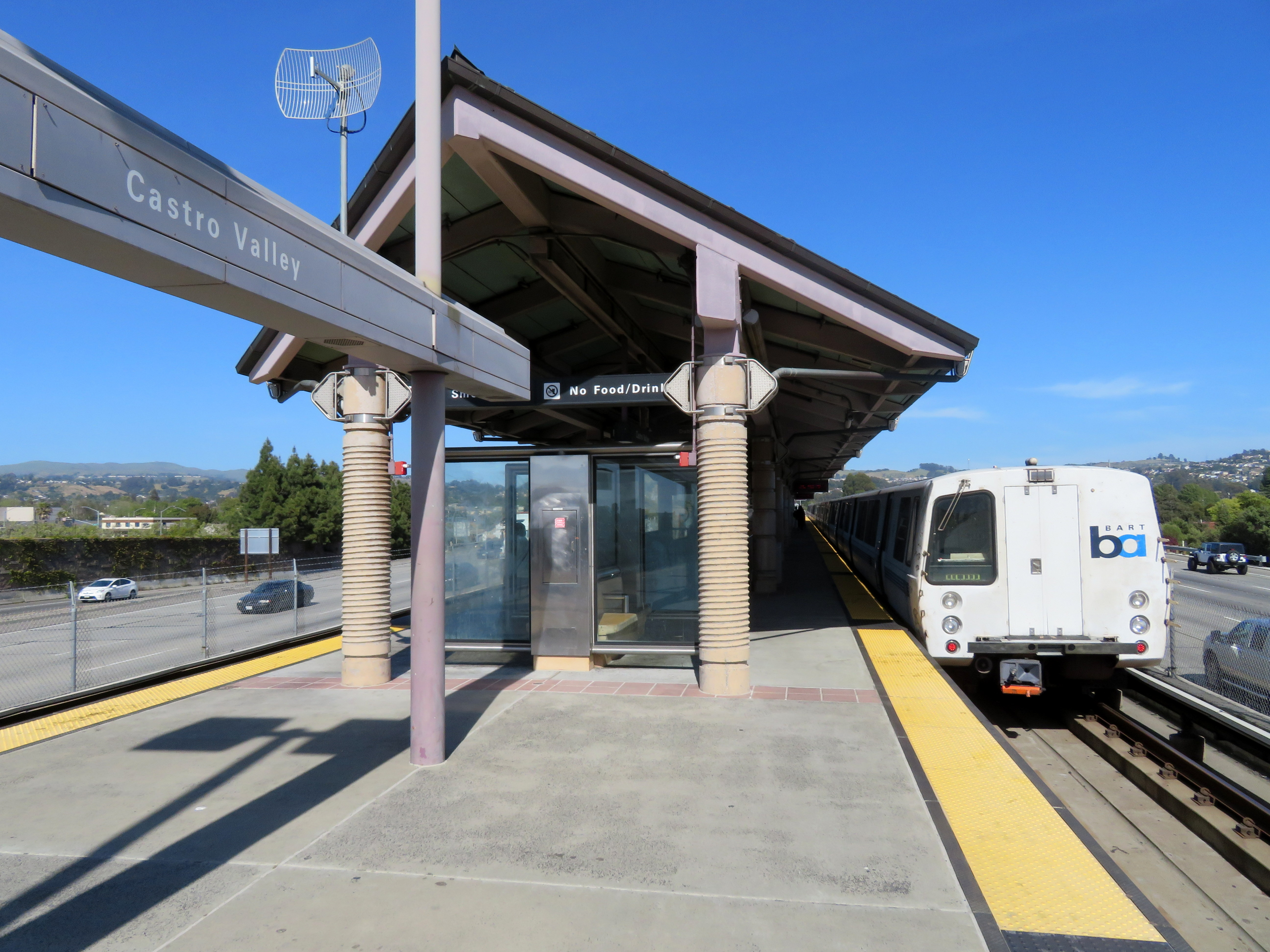
- An eastbound train at Castro Valley station in 2018

General information
- Location: 3301 Norbridge Drive; Castro Valley, California
- Coordinates: 37°41′27″N 122°04′32″W
- Line: BART L-Line
- Platforms: 1 island platform
- Tracks: 2
- Connections: AC Transit: 28, 93; Cal State East Bay shuttle

Construction
- Structure type: Embankment
- Parking: 1,123 spaces
- Cycle facilities: Racks, 32 BikeLink lockers, 20 lockers
- Accessible: Yes
- Architect: Group 4 ICF Kaiser Engineers

Other information
- Station code: BART: CAST

History
- Opened: May 10, 1997

Passengers
- 2025: 1,331 (weekday average)

Services
Preceding station	Bay Area Rapid Transit	Following station
Bay Fair toward Daly City	Blue Line	West Dublin/Pleasanton toward Dublin/Pleasanton
Location

Castro Valley station is a Bay Area Rapid Transit (BART) station located in the center median of Interstate 580 in Castro Valley, California. The entrance plaza, parking lots, and bus transfer area are located on the north side of the highway; a tunnel under the westbound lanes connects the entrance to the fare lobby, which is located under the island platform. The station is served by the Blue Line.

A 96-unit transit-oriented apartment complex was built on the northwest corner of the station site in 1993 while the station was under construction. The project included the restoration of a historic Victorian house. The station opened on May 10, 1997, as part of the extension to Dublin/Pleasanton station. It was the eastern terminus of AC Transit route M, which provided transbay service to Hillsdale over the San Mateo–Hayward Bridge, from March 2003 to March 2010. As of 2024, BART indicates "significant market, local support, and/or implementation barriers" that must be overcome to allow development on the surface parking lots at the station. Such development would not begin until at least the mid-2030s.
