= West Dublin/Pleasanton station =

Rapid transit station in San Francisco Bay Area

West Dublin/ Pleasanton
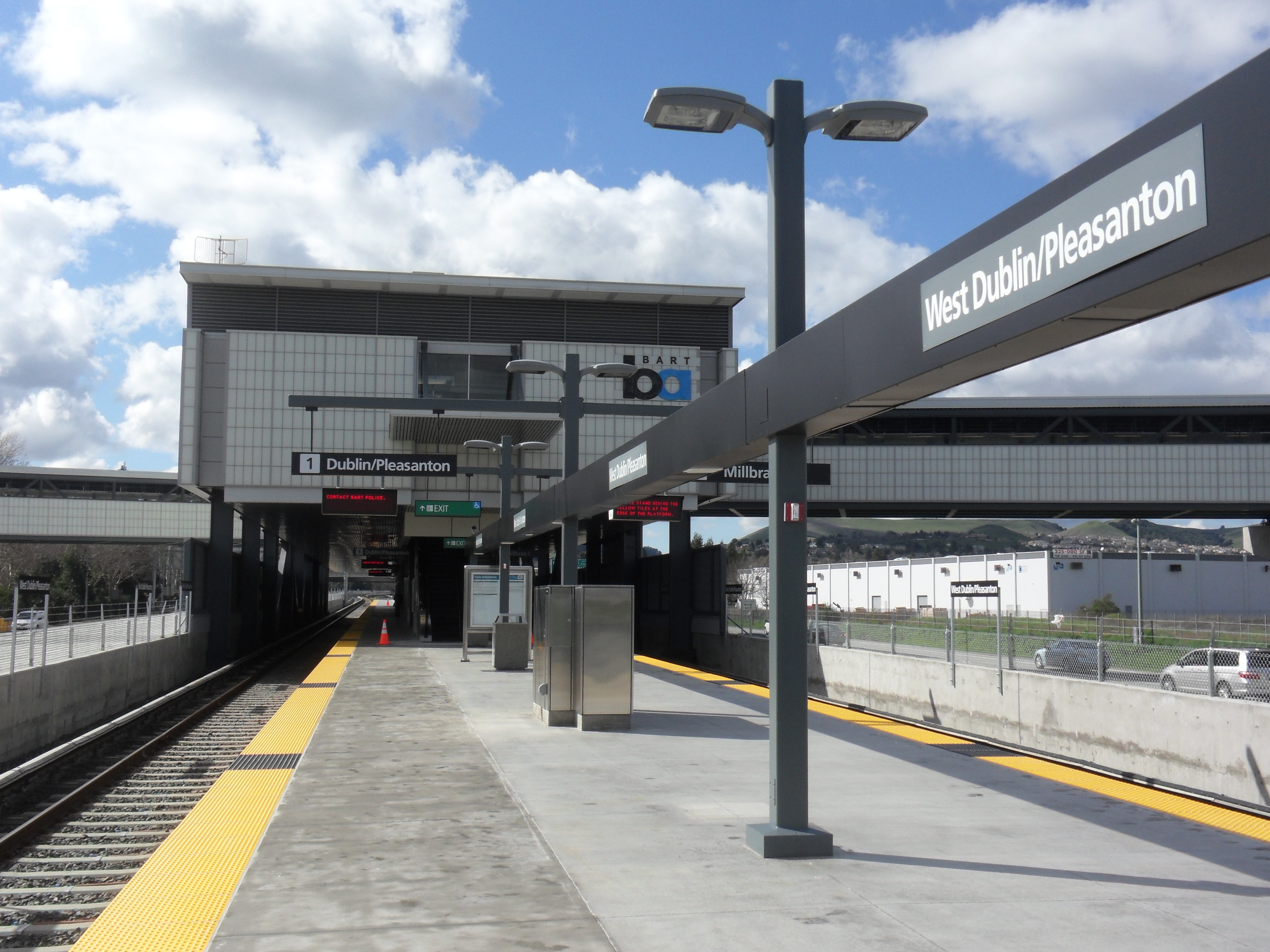
- The station on the second day of service in 2011

General information
- Location: 6501 Golden Gate Drive; Dublin, California
- Coordinates: 37.699726°N 121.928273°W
- Line: BART L-Line
- Platforms: 1 island platform
- Connections: Wheels: 3, 4, 30R, 53, 70X

Construction
- Structure type: At grade
- Parking: 1,190 spaces
- Accessible: Yes

Other information
- Station code: BART: WDUB

History
- Opened: February 19, 2011

Passengers
- 2025: 1,303 (weekday average)

Services
Preceding station	Bay Area Rapid Transit	Following station
Castro Valley toward Daly City	Blue Line	Dublin/Pleasanton Terminus
Location

West Dublin/Pleasanton station is a Bay Area Rapid Transit (BART) station on the border of Dublin and Pleasanton, California, located in the median of I-580. The station is served by the Blue Line. It has a single island platform between the highway travel lanes with a fare mezzanine above. Pedestrian bridges on both sides of the station connect it to a pair of parking garages and surrounding development. It opened as an infill station on February 19, 2011 — fourteen years after the rest of the Dublin/Pleasanton extension.

== History ==
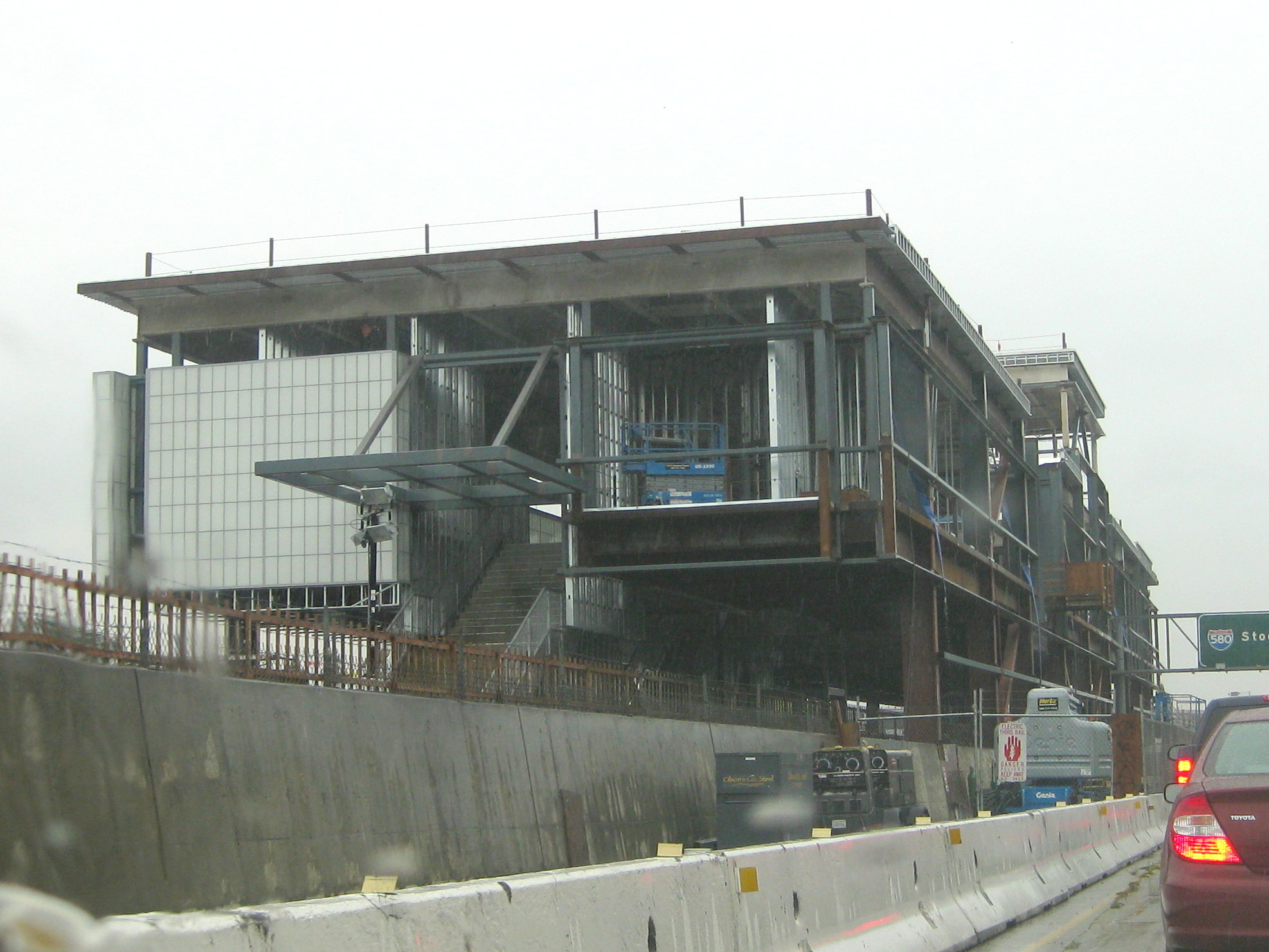
Station construction in May 2009

Original plans in the late 1980s called for a station in West Dublin, with an East Dublin station near the Hacienda Business Park to be added later; however, by the early 1990s the order was reversed, and only Dublin/Pleasanton station opened in 1997. BART began negotiating in April 1998 with LaSalle Partners to construct the West Dublin/Pleasanton station with private funding, and an agreement was signed the next year.

Groundbreaking for the station was held on September 29, 2006. The station was originally scheduled to be completed in 2009, but it was delayed due to structural issues with the pedestrian bridges. The $106 million station, which was funded largely by private money and by proceeds of planned transit-oriented development (TOD) on adjacent BART-owned property, opened on February 19, 2011.

The first phase of the TOD, a 309-unit residential building, opened in 2013 on the Dublin (north) side of the station. The second phase, a 410,000-square-foot (38,000 m^{2}) office building on the Pleasanton (south) side, was completed in 2019. As of 2024, a third phase with 300 residential units on the Dublin side is planned.

== Bus connections ==
Dublin/Pleasanton station is the primary bus terminal for the region; West Dublin/Pleasanton is only served by six Wheels routes. Routes 3, 4 and 30R stop at the north parking garage; routes 3, 70X and 53 stop on Stoneridge Mall Road near the south parking garage.
