= All Nighter (bus service) =

San Francisco Bay Area late night bus service

All-Nighter, with black and yellow owl and moon crescent mascot.

The All Nighter is a night bus service network in the San Francisco Bay Area, California. Portions of the service shadow the rapid transit and commuter rail services of BART and Caltrain, which are the major rail services between San Francisco, the East Bay, the Peninsula, and San Jose. Neither BART nor Caltrain operate owl service due to overnight track maintenance; the All Nighter network helps fill in this service gap. The slogan is, "Now transit stays up as late as you do!"

== History ==
The service launched initially in December 2005, and fully launched on March 19, 2006. BART performs overnight maintenance on its tracks, which requires the agency to shut down third rail power. Since there are no redundant BART lines, service is discontinued during maintenance hours. BART and Caltrain riders who previously faced uncoordinated substitute bus transit service after midnight can now take advantage of the coordinated All Nighter bus service.

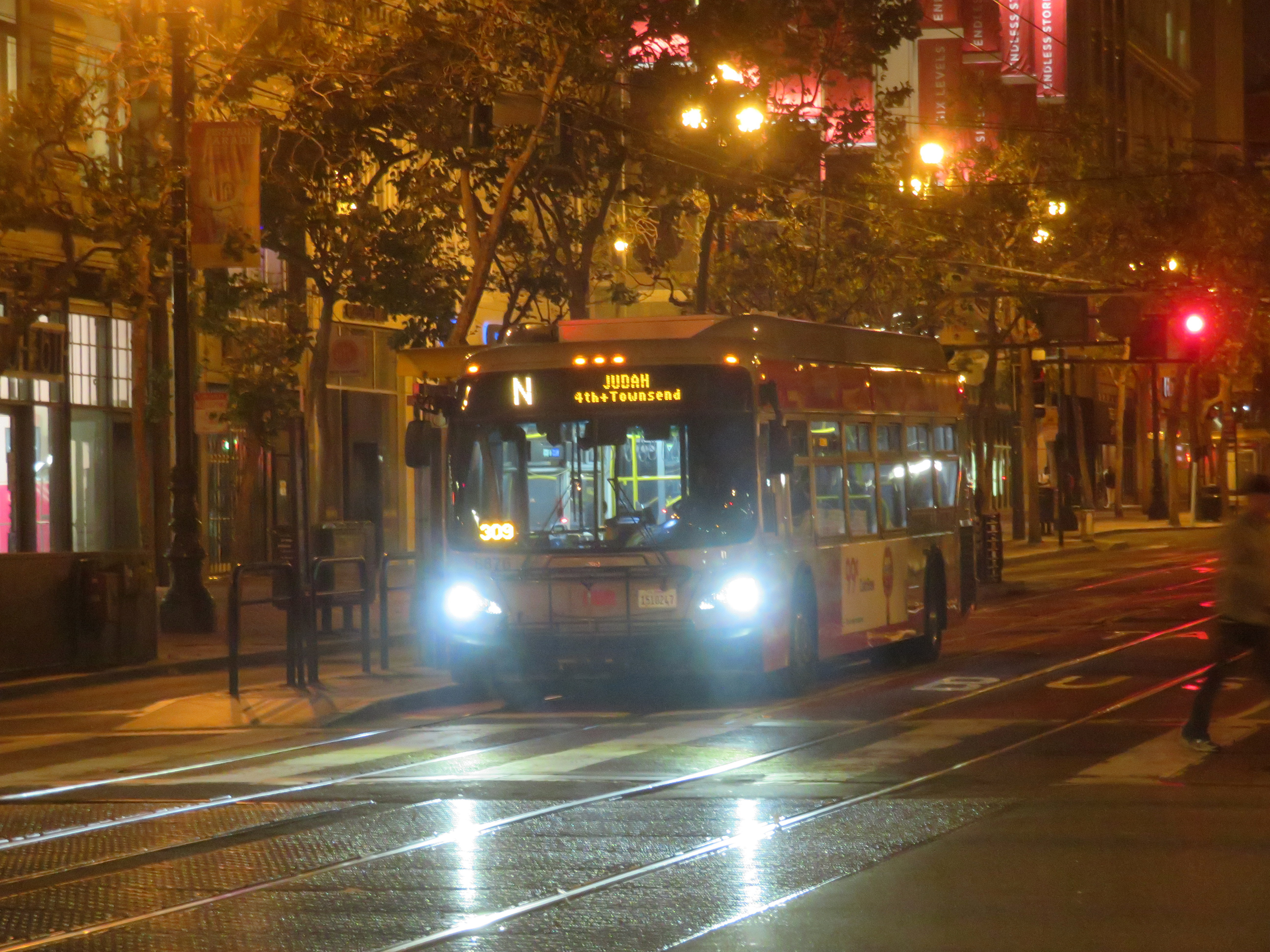
N-Judah Owl Muni bus at Market and Fifth (August 2018)

The service is operated by AC Transit, Muni, and SamTrans. The agencies have a network of timed transfers, and half-hourly weekend service was implemented between downtown San Francisco and several BART stations along the Richmond and Fremont lines. More frequent weekend service was later implemented as the Late Night Bus Pilot Program, funded by BART's operating budget, after a 2011 study concluded that shifting BART hours to stay open later but also start service later on weekends would adversely impact low-income and minority workers who rely on BART for their commute.

AC Transit Route 800 operates along Market Street in San Francisco; this is the first AC Transit route to operate anywhere within San Francisco beyond the Transbay Terminal. On weekends, Route 800 was extended to 24th and Mission for a few years, but the Mission Street stops have been discontinued.

The service is funded by Regional Measure 2 (RM2), which voters approved in 2004. The measure increased tolls by $1 on state-owned bridges in the Bay Area.

=== Before the AllNighter ===
Overnight transit service throughout the Bay Area predated the All Nighter initiative. Overnight service has consistently operated within San Francisco, but service outside of San Francisco has been inconsistent, rising and falling with the financial fortunes of the various transit agencies.

- AC Transit's long-standing overnight service was completely withdrawn in 1996, restored in 1999, and expanded in later years.
- SamTrans introduced overnight service to SFO in 2001 and maintained it with a subsidy from the airport starting in 2003.
- VTA introduced overnight service on Route 22 and the light rail network, but later withdrew overnight light rail service due to financial difficulties.
- Golden Gate Transit, which had long offered an essentially 24-hour service on Route 80 to Santa Rosa, reduced the span of service in 2003.

24-hour service was one of the issues considered in the Metropolitan Transportation Commission's 2001 Lifeline Network study, which detailed the transportation needs of economically disadvantaged individuals.

=== Discontinued routes ===
The All Nighter service initially included County Connection Route 820, which operated between downtown Oakland and central Contra Costa County. This route was discontinued effective December 28, 2008 due to budgetary problems and low ridership. Route 820 operated between downtown Oakland and Concord BART.

WHEELS Route 810 was another initial service offering which operated between Bay Fair BART in San Leandro and Livermore via Dublin/Pleasanton BART. Route 810 was discontinued effective June 27, 2009 due to budgetary problems and low ridership.

Additional service from Bay Fair BART to Castro Valley BART via AC Transit Route 880 was discontinued effective March 28, 2010 due to that agency's budgetary problems. Route 880 operated between Bay Fair BART and Castro Valley BART.

Weekend service to Pittsburg/Bay Point BART via AC Transit Line 822 was introduced as a one-year pilot program in December 2014; it was discontinued one year later effective December 20, 2015 due to low ridership. Line 822 operated weekends from San Francisco to Pittsburg/Bay Point BART via Oakland, Pleasant Hill BART and Walnut Creek BART.

VTA Route 22, which runs between Palo Alto and San Jose's Eastridge Center, carries approximately 20% of all VTA bus riders. Until spring 2020 it ran 24 hours a day, earning the nickname "Hotel 22" for the homeless that formed the majority of riders for the overnight runs. In January 2019, VTA proposed cutting service on Route 22 between 1 a.m. and 4 a.m. to help close a budget deficit. In April, the agency recommended continuing overnight service, but working with other agencies to redirect homeless riders to shelters. The overnight service was eliminated early in the COVID-19 pandemic and never fully restored.

=== Late Night Transportation Working Group ===
In April 2014, Supervisor Scott Wiener formed the Late Night Transportation Working Group to study options for improved public transportation in and around San Francisco. In September, the Working Group announced that BART would test more frequent service for AC Transit route 800, cutting headways from 30 to 20 minutes, and introduce service from San Francisco to Pittsburg/Bay Point BART via a new AC Transit route 822.

== Service area ==
Service in Contra Costa and Alameda counties (including Alameda, Berkeley, Fremont, Hayward, Oakland, Richmond and San Leandro) is provided by AC Transit. AC Transit also operates Transbay service to and from San Francisco over the San Francisco–Oakland Bay Bridge.

Service in San Francisco is provided by the San Francisco Municipal Railway. Service on the rest of the Peninsula is provided by SamTrans in San Mateo County with connections to San Francisco and Palo Alto. Service in the South Bay is provided by the VTA in Santa Clara County between Palo Alto and San Jose.

All Nighter service generally operates daily between midnight and 5 a.m. AC Transit's Transbay service operates until 6 a.m. on Saturdays and 8 a.m. on Sundays and designated holidays to correspond with the times BART is not operating.

=== Transfer points ===
The All Nighter network has two primary pulse transfer points where routes are coordinated to meet and provide direct transfers between agencies.

- The primary transfer point in San Francisco is at Market Street and Van Ness Avenue, where Muni, AC Transit, and SamTrans meet. Timed transfers are available between Muni's L Owl and 90 San Bruno Owl lines, AC Transit route 800, and SamTrans route 397. Muni's N Owl line stops there as well, but without any timed transfers to other All Nighter buses.
- The primary transfer point in downtown Oakland is at Broadway and 14th Street, where various AC Transit routes meet. Timed transfers are available between AC Transit routes 800, 801, 802, 805, 840, and 851.

Secondary timed transfer points are located at seven different locations in San Francisco. The transfer point between SamTrans and VTA is near the Palo Alto Transit Center, which connects SamTrans route 397 with VTA route 22; the routes are not coordinated.

=== Service gaps ===
The All-Nighter network operates primarily in dense areas centered on Oakland and San Francisco. No overnight service is provided to several parts of the Bay Area:

- Marin and Sonoma counties in the Golden Gate Transit service area (limited late night/early morning service is offered on GGT routes 30 and 101)
- Eastern Contra Costa County in the Tri-Delta Transit and County Connection service areas
- Western San Mateo County in the SamTrans service area
- Solano County in the SolTrans service area.
- Southern Alameda County and northern Santa Clara County between Fremont and San Jose

Among the major bridges crossing the Bay, only the San Francisco Bay Bridge has All Nighter service, connecting San Francisco and Oakland.

== Routes ==
The All Nighter network officially consists of 20+ bus routes.

BART shadow service is provided by AC Transit routes 800 (between San Francisco and Richmond) and 801 (between San Leandro and Fremont) in the East Bay, Muni route 14 in San Francisco (between Embarcadero and Daly City), and SamTrans route ECR OWL on the Peninsula (between Daly City and San Francisco International Airport). Caltrain shadow service is provided by SamTrans route 397 (between San Francisco and Palo Alto, including stops at SFO) and previously by VTA route 22 (between Palo Alto and San Jose).

All Nighter service to San Francisco International Airport is provided by both SamTrans route ECR OWL (operating to Daly City, where it connects with Muni) and SamTrans route 397. Service to Oakland International Airport is provided by AC Transit route 805.

Route	Communities served
Muni — San Francisco
L Taraval Owl	Downtown, Civic Center, Castro, Twin Peaks, Forest Hill, West Portal, Parkside, Ocean Beach
N Judah Owl	South of Market, South Beach, Downtown, Civic Center, Duboce Triangle, Haight, Inner Sunset, Outer Sunset, Ocean Beach
5 Fulton	Civic Center, Fillmore, NoPa, Inner Richmond, Outer Richmond, Ocean Beach
14 Mission (Note: Emulates BART.) (Note: Runs close to BART from Embarcadero to Daly City.)	South of Market, Mission District, Bernal Heights, Excelsior, Daly City
22 Fillmore	Marina, Cow Hollow, Pacific Heights, Fillmore, Mission District, Potrero Hill, Dogpatch
24 Divisadero	Castro, Noe Valley, Bernal Heights
25 Treasure Island	Transbay Terminal, Treasure Island
38 Geary	Transbay Terminal, Downtown, Union Square, Tenderloin, Western Addition, Japantown, Laurel Heights, Inner Richmond, Outer Richmond
44 O'Shaughnessy	Bayview, Bernal Heights, Diamond Heights, Excelsior, Glen Park, Golden Gate Park, Inner Richmond, Inner Sunset, Outer Mission, Presidio, Presidio Heights, Twin Peaks, West of Twin Peaks
48 Quintara/24th Street	Dogpatch, Potrero Hill, Mission East, Southeast Mission, West Mission, Juri Commons, Fair Oaks, Central Noe Valley, Upper Noe
90 San Bruno Owl (Note: Combination of the 9 San Bruno and 47 Van Ness daytime bus lines.)	Marina, Civic Center, South of Market, Mission District, Portola, Visitacion Valley
91 3rd Street/19th Avenue Owl (Note: Emulates Caltrain.) (Note: Combination of the K Ingleside, T Third, 8 Bayshore, 28 19th Avenue and 30 Stockton daytime bus and rail lines.)	Parkmerced, Parkside, Sunset, Richmond, Marina, Fisherman's Wharf, North Beach, Chinatown, Downtown, SoMa, Dogpatch, Bayview, Visitacion Valley, Excelsior, Ingleside, St. Francis Wood, West Portal
AC Transit — East Bay
1T (Note: Parallels BART service between 19th St/Oakland and San Leandro) (International – E 14th)	Oakland, San Leandro
800 (Note: Parallels BART service to Richmond. Combination of portions of the F, 6, 51B, and 72M daytime bus lines.) (Richmond – Oakland – Transbay)	San Francisco, Oakland, Berkeley, Albany, El Cerrito, Richmond
801 (Note: Parallels BART service to Fremont. Combination of portions of the 9 and 211 daytime bus lines.) (E 14th – Mission)	San Leandro, Ashland, Cherryland, Hayward, Union City, Fremont
802 (Note: Serves a portion of the 72/72M daytime bus line.) (San Pablo)	Oakland, Emeryville, Berkeley, Berkeley Amtrak
805 (Note: Combination of portions of the NL, 12, 57, and 73 daytime bus lines.) (MacArthur – Airport)	Oakland, Oakland International Airport
840 (Note: Serves a portion of the 40 daytime bus line.) (Foothill – Eastmont)	Oakland
851 (Note: Combination of portions of the 51A and 51B daytime bus lines.) (College – Broadway)	Berkeley, Oakland, Alameda
SamTrans — Peninsula
397 OWL (Note: Combination of portions of the ECR, 281, 292, and 296 daytime bus lines.) (Note: Supplemented by 296 OWL between Redwood City and Palo Alto.)	San Francisco, Brisbane, South San Francisco, San Francisco International Airport, Millbrae, Burlingame, San Mateo, Belmont, San Carlos, Redwood City, Atherton, Menlo Park, East Palo Alto, Palo Alto
ECR OWL (Note: Runs close to BART between Daly City and San Francisco International Airport.)	Daly City, Colma, South San Francisco, San Bruno, San Francisco International Airport

=== Initial list of routes ===
The initial service providers for the All Nighter service in 2006 were AC Transit, Muni, SamTrans, County Connection, and Wheels. Most headways were 60 minutes, with the exception of Muni (30 minutes except 45 minutes on the 25-Treasure Island) and AC Transit (30 minutes on weekend routes 800 and 801).

Route	Communities served
AC Transit — East Bay
800	San Francisco—Richmond via Oakland, Berkeley, Albany, El Cerrito
801	Oakland—Fremont via San Leandro, Hayward, Union City, Fremont
802	Oakland—Berkeley via Emeryville
805	Oakland—Oakland International Airport
840	Oakland—Eastmont
851	Alameda—Berkeley via Oakland
Muni — San Francisco
L Taraval Owl	Downtown, Civic Center, Castro, Twin Peaks, Forest Hill, West Portal, Parkside, Ocean Beach
N Judah Owl	South of Market, South Beach, Downtown, Civic Center, Duboce Triangle, Haight, Inner Sunset, Outer Sunset, Ocean Beach
5 Fulton	Civic Center, Fillmore, NoPa, Inner Richmond, Outer Richmond, Ocean Beach
14 Mission	South of Market, Mission District, Bernal Heights, Excelsior, Daly City
22 Fillmore	Marina, Cow Hollow, Pacific Heights, Fillmore, Mission District, Potrero Hill, Dogpatch
24 Divisadero	Castro, Noe Valley, Bernal Heights
25 Treasure Island	Transbay Terminal, Treasure Island
38 Geary	Transbay Terminal, Downtown, Union Square, Tenderloin, Western Addition, Japantown, Laurel Heights, Inner Richmond, Outer Richmond
90 San Bruno Owl	Marina, Civic Center, South of Market, Mission District, Portola, Visitacion Valley
91 3rd Street/19th Avenue Owl	Parkmerced, Parkside, Sunset, Richmond, Marina, Fisherman's Wharf, North Beach, Chinatown, Downtown, SoMa, Dogpatch, Bayview, Visitacion Valley, Excelsior, Ingleside, St. Francis Wood, West Portal
SamTrans — Peninsula
397	San Francisco—Palo Alto via Brisbane, South San Francisco, San Francisco International Airport, Millbrae, Burlingame, San Mateo, Belmont, San Carlos, Redwood City, Atherton, Menlo Park, East Palo Alto
County Connection — Contra Costa County
820	Oakland—Concord via Orinda, Lafayette, Walnut Creek, Pleasant Hill
Wheels — Alameda County
810	San Leandro—Livermore via Bay Fair, Dublin, Pleasanton
