= Blue Line (BART) =

Rapid transit line in the San Francisco Bay Area

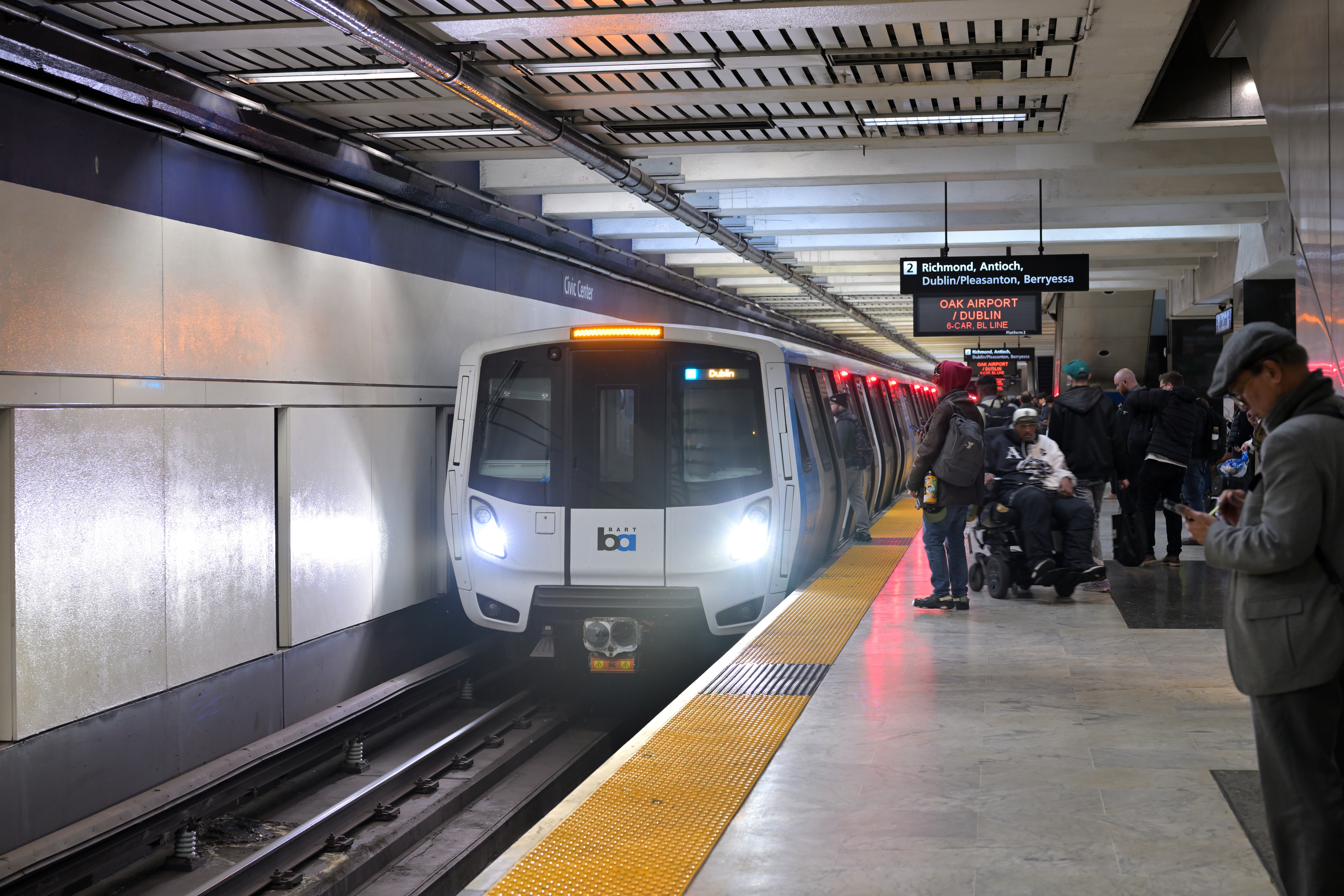
- Pleasanton-bound train at Civic Center station in January 2026

Overview
- Owner: San Francisco Bay Area Rapid Transit District
- Locale: Tri-Valley, East Bay, San Francisco Peninsula
- Termini: Dublin/Pleasanton; Daly City
- Stations: 18

Service
- Type: Rapid transit
- System: Bay Area Rapid Transit

History
- Opened: May 10, 1997

Technical
- Line length: 35.7 mi (57.5 km)
- Track gauge: 5 ft 6 in (1,676 mm)
- Electrification: Third rail, 1 kV DC
- Operating speed: 70 mph (110 km/h)
Route map
Blue Line highlighted in blue

The Blue Line is a Bay Area Rapid Transit (BART) line in the San Francisco Bay Area that runs between Dublin/Pleasanton station and Daly City station. It has 18 stations in Dublin, Pleasanton, Castro Valley, San Leandro, Oakland, San Francisco, and Daly City.

The Blue Line shares much of its track with other BART services. The eastern segment which is unique to it is located in the median of Interstate 580, as are its three unique stations of Castro Valley, West Dublin/Pleasanton, and Dublin/Pleasanton.

== History ==
Of BART's five primary rapid transit services, the Blue Line was the most recent to open. Service began when the Dublin/Pleasanton extension opened on May 10, 1997. The West Dublin/Pleasanton infill station was added to the line on February 19, 2011.

=== SFO/Millbrae extension service ===
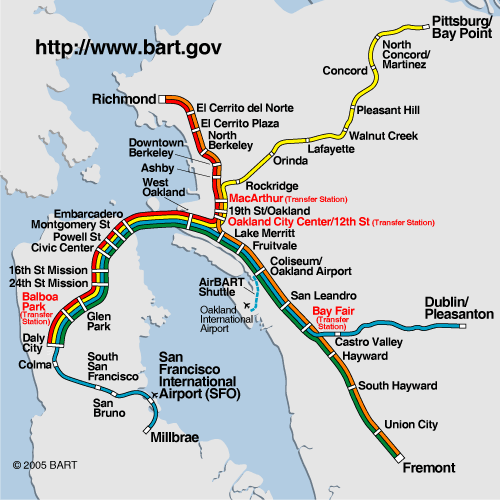
September 2005 BART map showing only the Dublin/Pleasanton line operating south of Daly City

When the SFO/Millbrae extension opened on June 22, 2003, BART extended the Blue Line to SFO. BART truncated the Blue Line back to Daly City and rerouted the Yellow Line to San Francisco International Airport in its place on February 9, 2004. San Mateo County is not a member of the San Francisco Bay Area Rapid Transit District, so SamTrans funded the county's BART service. When the extension's lower-than-expected ridership caused SamTrans to accrue deficits, BART agreed to SamTrans' request to operate only this line south of Daly City effective September 12, 2005.

SamTrans and BART reached an agreement in February 2007 in which SamTrans would transfer control and financial responsibility of the SFO/Millbrae extension to BART, in return for BART receiving additional fixed funding from SamTrans and other sources. BART has since again increased service south of Daly City, but this line now terminates at Daly City.

Blue Line's south-of-Daly City service
Date of change	Service pattern
June 22, 2003	Daly City–SFO
February 9, 2004	none
September 12, 2005	Daly City–SFO/Millbrae
January 1, 2008	Daly City–Millbrae (evenings/weekends)
September 14, 2009	none

=== 2019–2022 changes ===
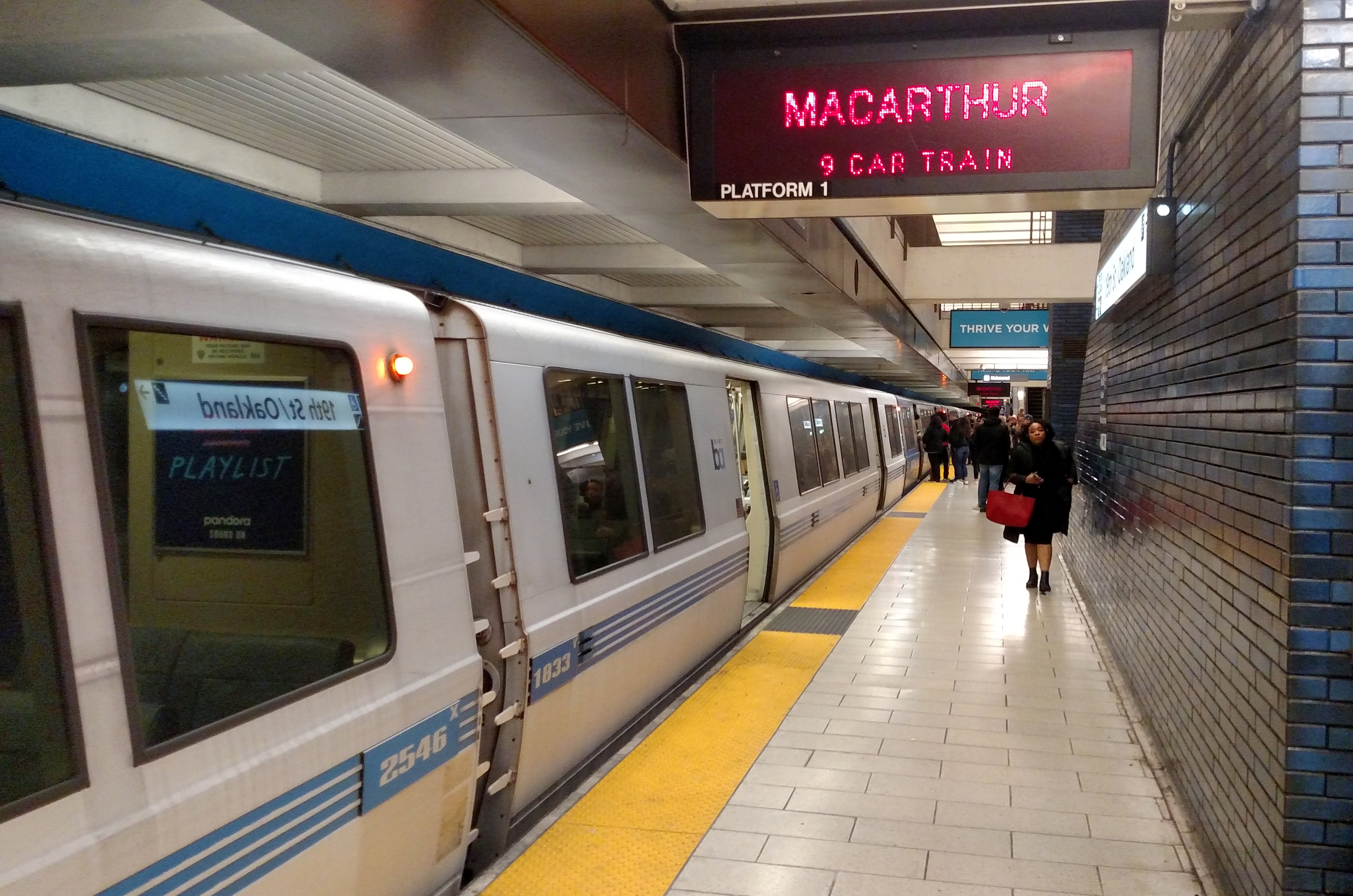
MacArthur-bound train at 19th Street Oakland in February 2019

On February 11, 2019, the Blue Line began operating between MacArthur station and Dublin/Pleasanton station on Sundays. The change was to allow single-tracking in the Market Street subway during electrical work, with only the Yellow Line running through the Transbay Tube to serve San Francisco.

Sunday service to San Francisco and Daly City resumed on February 16, 2020. From February 16, 2020, to September 13, 2020, and again from March 22, 2021, to August 1, 2021, trains terminated at Montgomery station during single-tracking work. From September 14, 2020, to March 21, 2021, and again from August 2, 2021, onwards, trains terminate at 24th Street Mission during single-tracking work.

== Stations ==
Station	Jurisdiction	County	Opened	Rail connections
Dublin/Pleasanton	Dublin / Pleasanton	Alameda	May 10, 1997	
West Dublin/Pleasanton	Dublin / Pleasanton	Alameda	February 19, 2011	
Castro Valley	Castro Valley	Alameda	May 10, 1997	
Bay Fair	San Leandro	Alameda	September 11, 1972	BART:
San Leandro	San Leandro	Alameda	September 11, 1972	BART:
Coliseum	Oakland	Alameda	September 11, 1972	BART: Amtrak: Capitol Corridor
Fruitvale	Oakland	Alameda	September 11, 1972	BART:
Lake Merritt	Oakland	Alameda	September 11, 1972	BART:
West Oakland	Oakland	Alameda	September 16, 1974	BART:
Embarcadero	San Francisco		May 27, 1976	BART: Muni: Cable Cars
Montgomery Street	San Francisco		November 5, 1973	BART: Muni:
Powell Street	San Francisco		November 5, 1973	BART: Muni: Cable Cars
Civic Center/UN Plaza	San Francisco		November 5, 1973	BART: Muni:
16th Street Mission	San Francisco		November 5, 1973	BART:
24th Street Mission	San Francisco		November 5, 1973	BART:
Glen Park	San Francisco		November 5, 1973	BART: Muni:
Balboa Park	San Francisco		November 5, 1973	BART: Muni:
Daly City	Daly City	San Mateo	November 5, 1973	BART:
