= Dublin/Pleasanton station =

Rapid transit station in Pleasanton, California, US

Dublin/Pleasanton
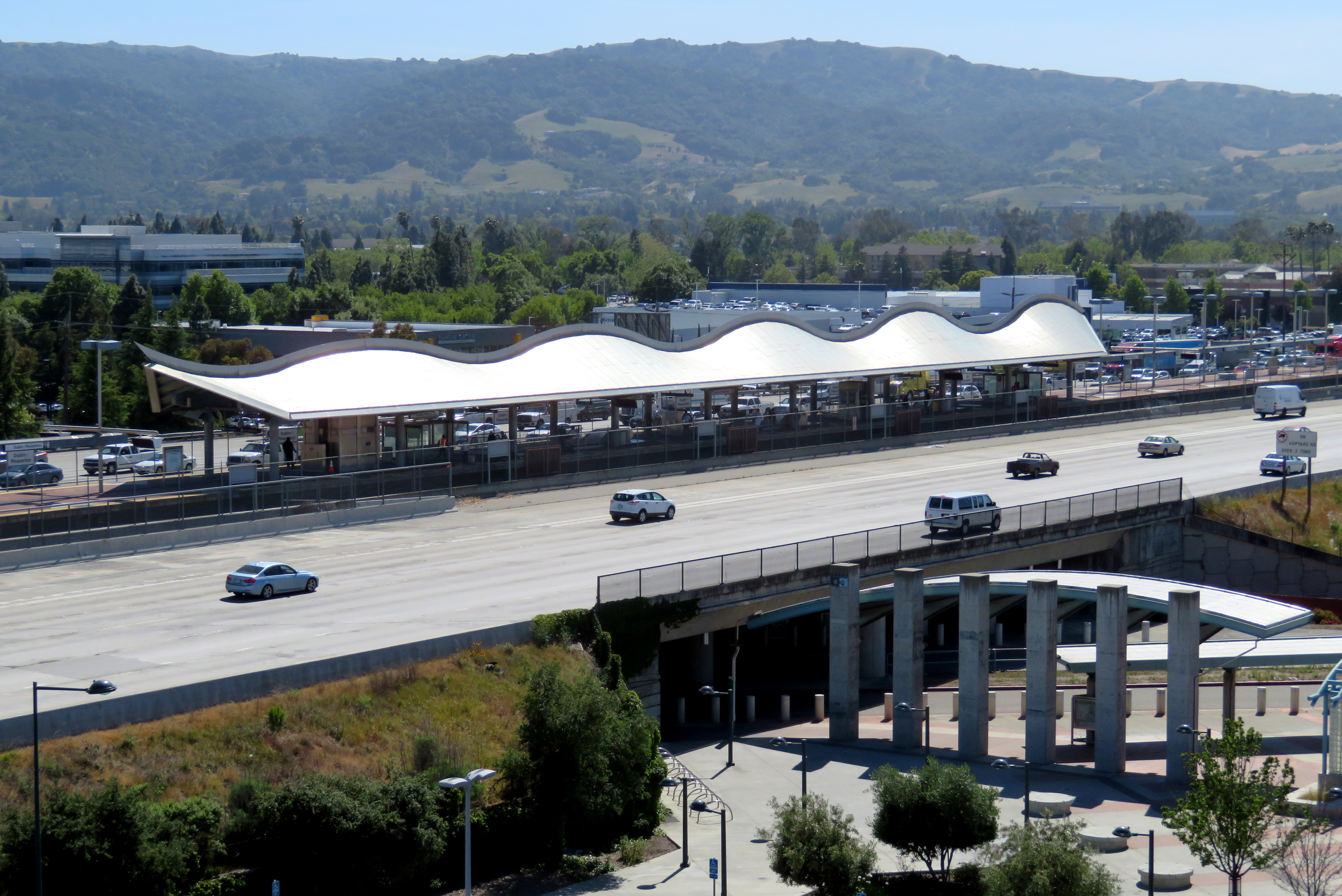
- Dublin/Pleasanton station viewed from the parking garage in 2018

General information
- Location: 5801 Owens Drive; Pleasanton, California
- Coordinates: 37.701663°N 121.899232°W
- Owner: San Francisco Bay Area Rapid Transit District
- Line: BART L-Line
- Platforms: 1 island platform
- Tracks: 2
- Connections: Amtrak Thruway; County Connection: 35, 335, 97X; San Joaquin Regional Transit District: 150; Stanislaus Regional Transit Authority: BART Commuter routes; Wheels: 1, 2, 3, 4, 8, 10R, 14, 20X, 30R, 54, 70X, 580X

Construction
- Structure type: Elevated
- Parking: 2,927 spaces
- Cycle facilities: 24 lockers
- Accessible: Yes
- Architect: Stone, Marraccini & Patterson

Other information
- Station code: BART: DUBL; Amtrak: DBP

History
- Opened: May 10, 1997

Passengers
- 2025: 3,223 (weekday average)

Services
Preceding station	Bay Area Rapid Transit	Following station
West Dublin/Pleasanton toward Daly City	Blue Line	Terminus
Planned services
Preceding station	Valley Link	Following station
Terminus	Initial Operating Phase	Isabel toward Mountain House Community or Vasco Road
Location

Dublin/Pleasanton station is a Bay Area Rapid Transit (BART) station on the border of Dublin and Pleasanton, California. It is the eastern terminus of the Blue Line. It is also a major bus terminal served by six providers.

The station consists of an island platform located in the center median of the elevated Interstate 580. A fare lobby is located under the platform; a pedestrian and vehicle underpass connects the station to bus bays, parking lots, a parking garage, and surrounding development. The Iron Horse Regional Trail connects to both the north and south sides of the station.

== History ==
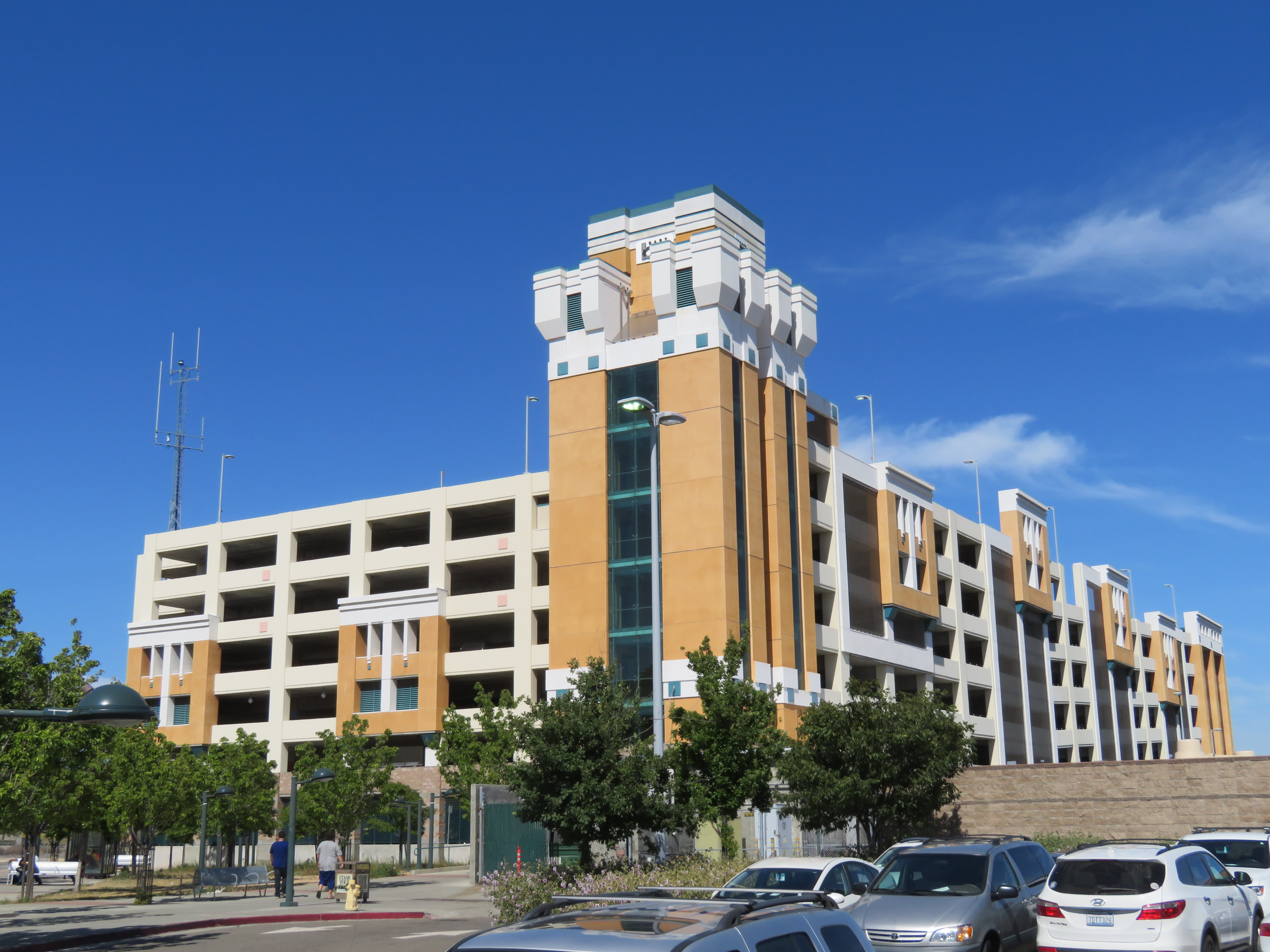
The 2008-opened parking garage

Original plans in the late 1980s called for a station in West Dublin, with an East Dublin station near the Hacienda Business Park to be added later; however, by the early 1990s the order was reversed. The station was initially called East Dublin/Pleasanton during planning to differentiate it from the then-planned West Dublin/Pleasanton station (which ultimately opened in 2011). The BART board changed the name to Dublin/Pleasanton on March 28, 1996. Service at the station began on May 10, 1997. Wheels bus service used the "East Dublin/Pleasanton" name until 2025.

The station design features a "wave" design motif, most notably in the titanium canopy roof over the passenger platform, which has a silhouette of five curves intended to both echo the shape of the nearby hills in Dublin and "represent the sound waves generated by BART's electric propulsion." Installation of second-generation faregates at the BART station took place in December 2024.

An adjacent transit-oriented development (TOD) on the Dublin side of the station with 240 residential units finished initial construction in 2006. The development included a 1,513-space BART parking garage, which opened on May 23, 2008. According to its architects, the "external design treatments ... draw the eye away from the height and size", but the San Francisco Chronicle's urban design critic John King dismissed the result as "cartoonishly clumsy." As of 2024, BART anticipates soliciting a developer between 2029 and 2033 for a second phase of TOD on the Pleasanton (south) side of the station, while additional TOD on the Dublin side would not begin until at least the mid-2030s.

The construction of a second 665-space garage, promised by BART in 2002, proved controversial. A $37.1 million design was brought forward in February 2017; local officials were in favor of the garage – noting that existing parking was full by 7:45am on weekdays – but the BART Board rejected it because of cost concerns and a 2016 BART policy to prioritize non-auto access to stations. The Board instead approved a $17.2 million "hybrid" model that included restriping existing parking, improving bus service and Iron Horse Regional Trail connections, and installation of an automated parking system. In May 2018, local officials announced plans for a $30 million garage entirely on city-owned land and not subject to BART approval. The project will use $20 million in state funds awarded to the Livermore Amador Valley Transit Authority plus $10 million in local funds. A groundbreaking was held in October 2018. However, construction was delayed by the COVID-19 pandemic, and bidding did not take place until late 2021. Construction began in November 2022. The garage opened in June 2024.

The Tri-Valley-San Joaquin Valley Regional Rail Authority plans to construct a rail line, Valley Link, running east from the station to serve Livermore and San Joaquin County.

== Bus connections ==
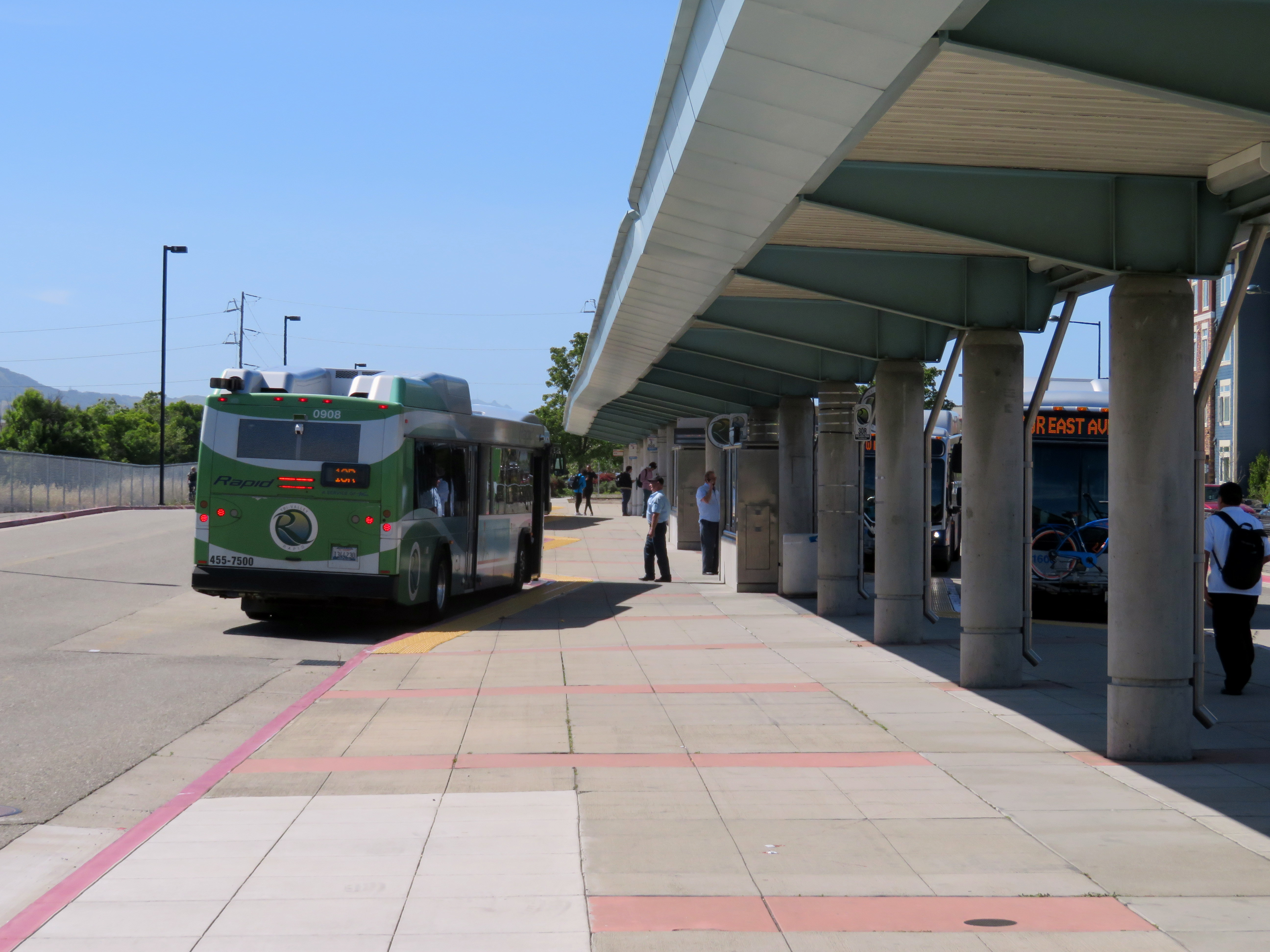
WHEELS buses at the station in 2018

As the terminus of a BART line, Dublin/Pleasanton station serves as a local and intercity bus hub. A 10-bay bus plaza is located on the north side of the station; several more bus bays are located on the south side of the station. Two local bus providers use these bays for a number of routes that run in the Tri-Valley:

- County Connection: 35, 335, 97X
- Wheels: 1, 2, 3, 4, 8, 10R, 14, 20X, 30R, 54, 70X, 580X

Because I-580 is the primary highway from the Bay Area to the Central Valley, the station is the western terminus for several lengthy commuter-based routes from Central Valley cities. Those three routes, plus several daily Amtrak Thruway bus trips connecting with the Gold Runner train route, stop next to the parking garage north of the station.

- San Joaquin Regional Transit District: Route 150 (serving Tracy, Lathrop, and Stockton)
- Stanislaus Regional Transit Authority: BART Commuter – Turlock/Patterson, BART Commuter – Modesto

Tri-Delta Transit ran a Delta Express route from Antioch to West Dublin/Pleasanton station via Brentwood and Dublin/Pleasanton station from August 18, 2003, to February 24, 2012.
