= Campus Bay, Richmond, California =

Campus Bay is an 87-acre (350,000 m^{2}) property in the city of Richmond, California located off Interstate 580 (California), and situated between the San Francisco Bay, the Richmond Annex, and Point Isabel neighborhoods. The area receives its name from its proximity to the UC Berkeley Richmond Field Station.

== History ==
The property's history goes back more than 100 years when it became home to a succession of chemical manufacturing companies, most notably Stauffer Chemical Company and, lastly, Zeneca, Inc. Manufacturing operations ceased in 1997 and an environmental cleanup was initiated under the oversight of the San Francisco Bay Regional Water Quality Control Board (RWQCB).

== Contamination and cleanup ==
In late 2002, Cherokee Simeon Venture I, LLC (CSV) acquired the property from Zeneca and continued the cleanup work. In 2005, regulatory oversight of the Campus Bay investigation and cleanup was transferred to the California Department of Toxic Substances Control (DTSC). The cleanup of the site, which is ongoing, is being conducted in cooperation with the community, DTSC, and the property owner. Following the cleanup, the site could be redeveloped for a variety of uses, including residential, retail, commercial and recreational. Campus Bay is located within a City of Richmond redevelopment district.

In 2007, remediation work was completed on the portion of the property known as East Stege Marsh. In 2008, DTSC approved the Lots 1 and 2 Remedial Investigation (RI), an analysis of environmental conditions for a 26-acre (110,000 m^{2}) portion of the property.

The site may have radioactive waste.

== Transportation ==
The area is directly accessible by Bear Transit route RFS which connects the area with UC Village, El Cerrito Plaza BART, and downtown Berkeley BART and UC Berkeley
