= Berkeley station (Southern Pacific Railroad) =

Berkeley
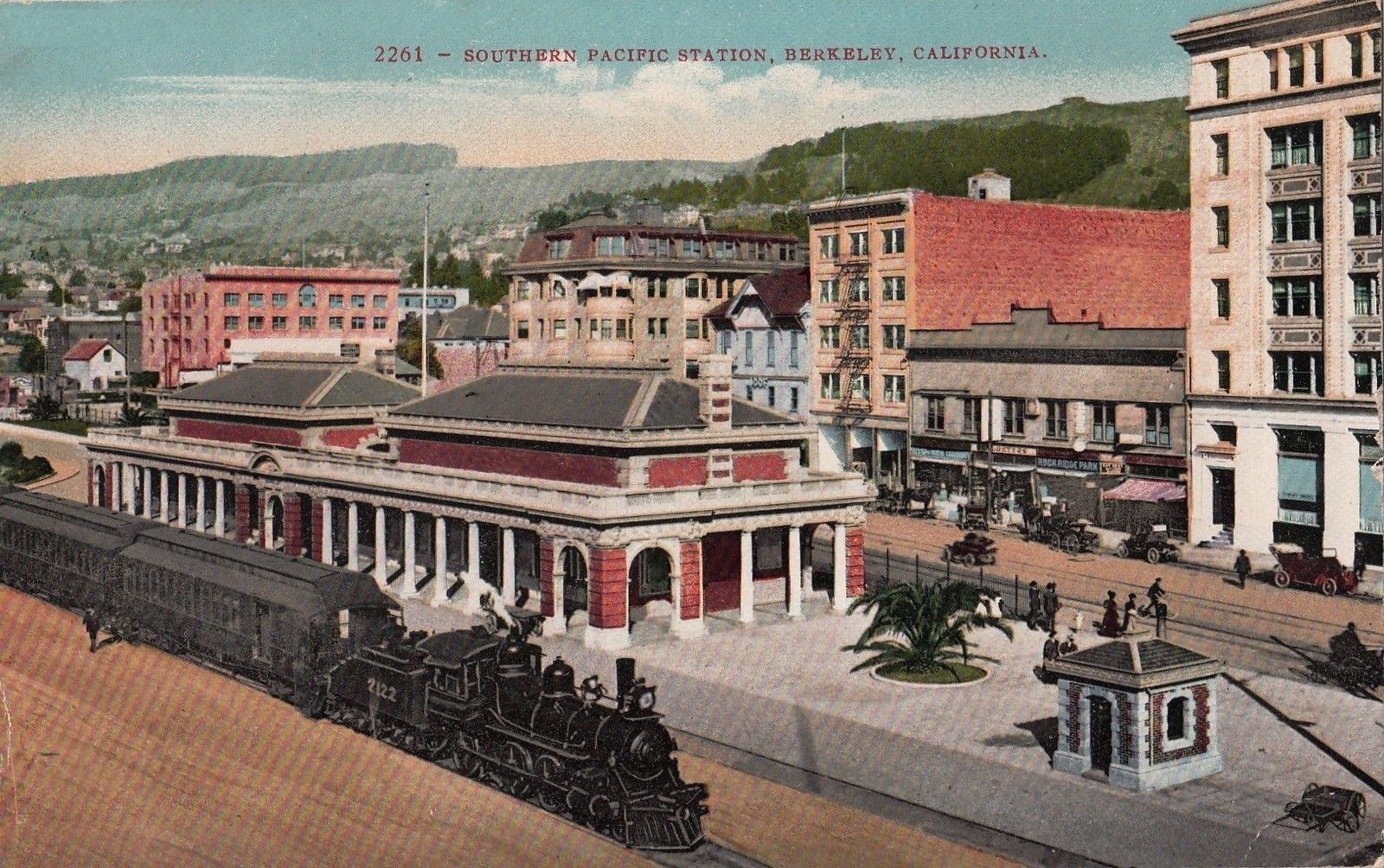
- The station c. 1908–1915

General information
- Location: Shattuck Avenue; Berkeley, California
- Coordinates: 37.87119°N 122.268°W
- Line: Berkeley Branch Railroad

History
- Opened: 1876
- Closed: 1938
- Rebuilt: 1892; 1906–1908
- Electrified: 1911

Services
Preceding station	Southern Pacific Railroad	Following station
Dwight toward Transbay Terminal	Berkeley Branch	Berryman's toward Thousand Oaks
Preceding station	Key System	Following station
Dwight toward Transbay Terminal	F	Virginia toward Solano & The Alameda
Interurban Electric Railway
1911–1941
Location

Berkeley Station was the name of the principal railroad station in Berkeley, California from 1878 to 1911. It was located in what is now downtown Berkeley, on Shattuck Avenue between University Avenue and Center Street. The tract is today occupied by Shattuck Square and Berkeley Square. The name continued in use after 1911 although the station was no longer the main rail depot for Berkeley.

== History ==
Berkeley Station began as the "Berkeley Terminus" of the Central Pacific Railroad's Berkeley Branch Railroad, established in 1876, two years before Berkeley was incorporated. The first train ran to Oakland Pier on August 16. In 1878, the railroad was extended northward several blocks, so the "terminus" was renamed Berkeley Station. In 1885, the Central Pacific's operation of the Berkeley Branch was turned over to its affiliate, the Southern Pacific. In 1911, the Berkeley line was electrified and became part of the subsidiary East Bay Electric Lines.

From 1876 to about 1892, Berkeley Station included a small wooden depot located close to Center and Shattuck. About 1892, the first depot was replaced by a slightly larger wood depot. In 1906, construction began on a much larger brick and stone depot designed by the SP's architect Daniel J. Patterson which opened in 1908. This new depot consisted of two main buildings linked by a small enclosed courtyard. The north building was used as a baggage facility while the south building included the ticket office and waiting room. The original design which included a fountain was scaled back somewhat due to the costs incurred by the railroad as a result of the San Francisco earthquake of 1906. Although it was never disclosed formally by the railroad, the local newspapers reported that the new depot was part of a larger plan to re-route all mainline passenger trains through downtown Berkeley while extending the Berkeley Branch tracks northward from Berkeley along or through the Berkeley Hills where they would re-join the existing mainline. This possibility was not welcomed by the community. Key System's Berkeley Line began running here starting in 1903.

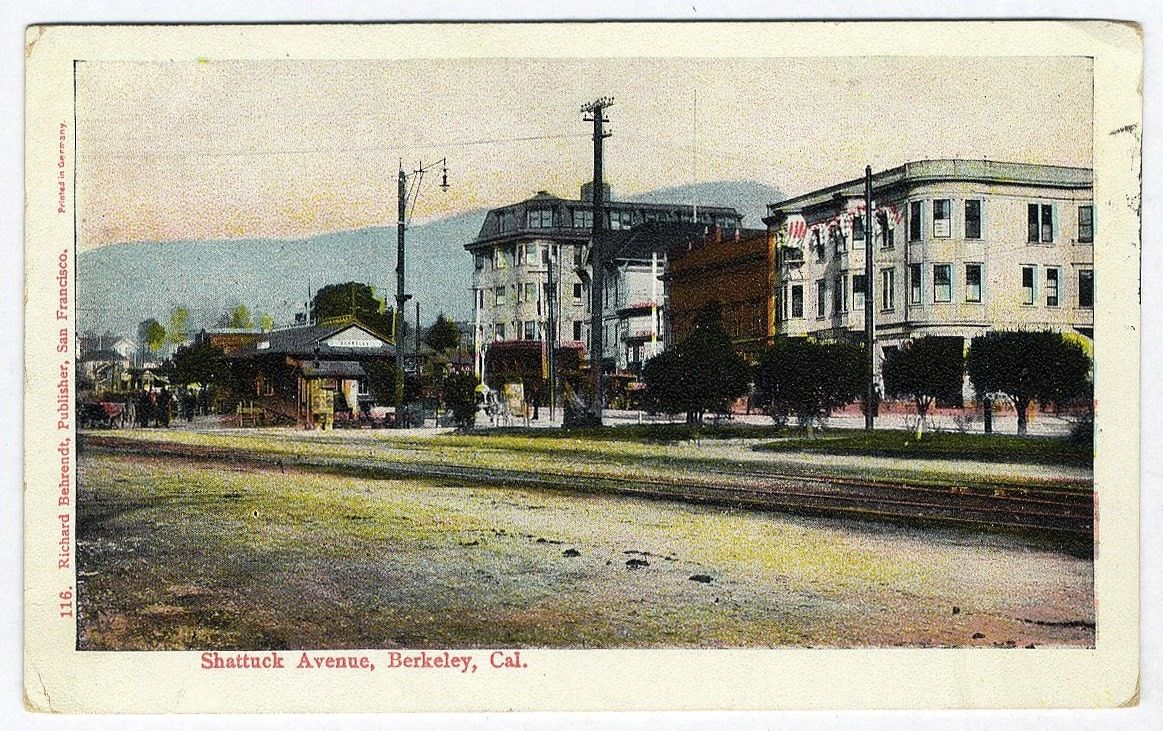
The second wooden structure serving as station building, c. 1907

In 1911, at the urging of the community backed up by a ruling by the California State Railroad Commission, the Southern Pacific replaced its small wooden depot at Delaware Street in West Berkeley which, although it lay along the existing mainline, was too small, and most mainline trains did not observe it as a scheduled stop. The new West Berkeley Station was constructed one block south of the Delaware depot at Third and University, and was as large as Berkeley Station. The Southern Pacific scheduled it as a regular stop for its mainline trains, and thus, Berkeley Station lost its primacy. It continued as a regular railroad depot, but was incorporated into the Southern Pacific's electric commuter system, the East Bay Electric Lines. When the opening of the rail line on the new San Francisco–Oakland Bay Bridge was imminent in the late 1930s, the Southern Pacific successfully petitioned the Railroad Commission to close and demolish the depot at Berkeley Station, arguing that since the downtown trains would no longer connect with the mainline at the 16th Street Station (the bridge line bypassed it), such a large station was unnecessary. The depot was demolished in August 1938, its function replaced by a small ticket office in a commercial building which rose in its place.

In 1972, the name "Berkeley Station" was revived as the name of the BART stop in downtown Berkeley, but was changed to "Downtown Berkeley" in the 1990s. The Amtrak stop adjacent to the old West Berkeley depot at Third and University is currently called "Berkeley Station".

== See also ==
- Berkeley station (Atchison, Topeka and Santa Fe Railway)
