= Haas Pavilion =

Arena in Berkeley, California

Walter A. Haas, Jr. Pavilion
- Pete Newell Court
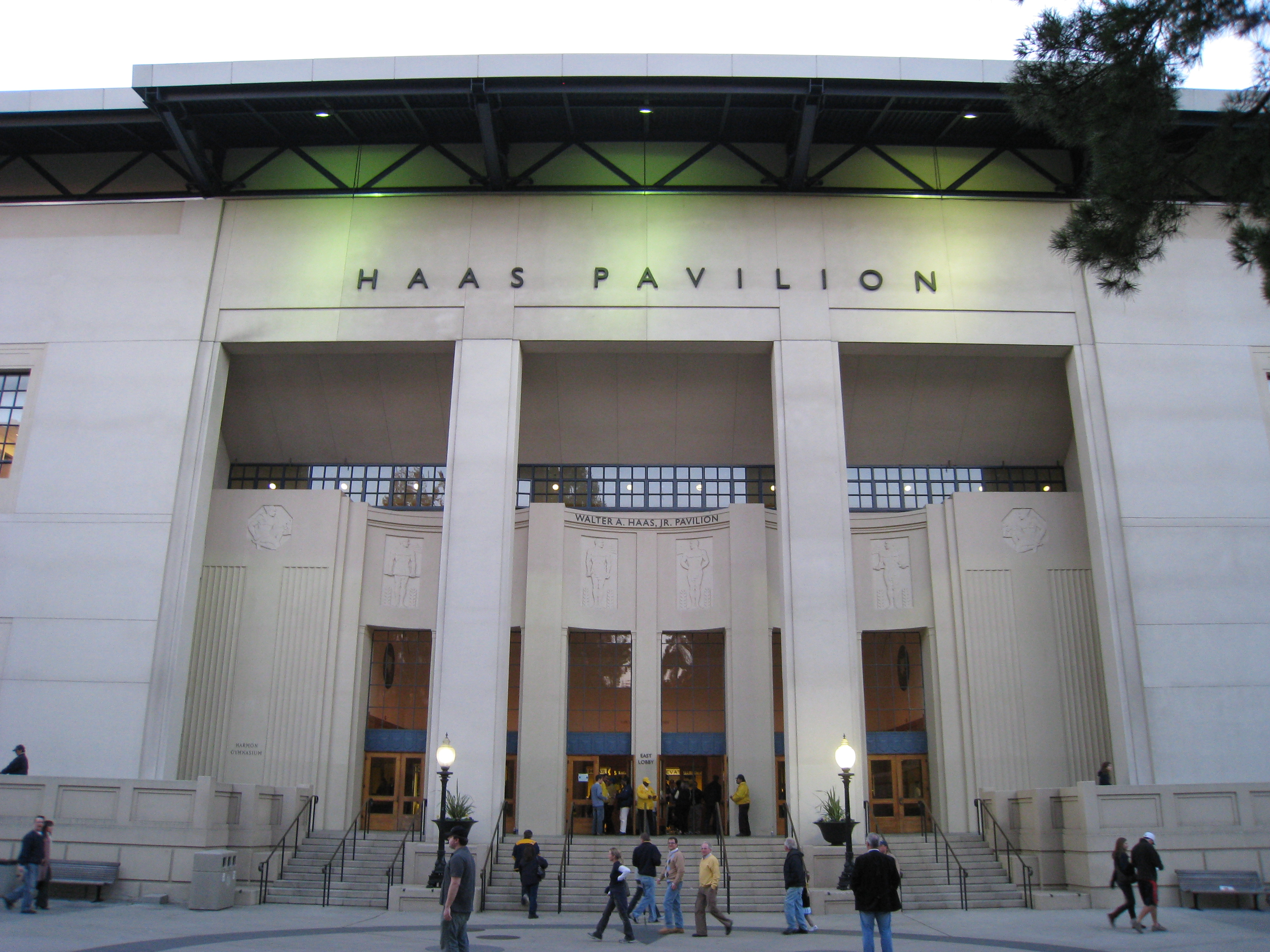
- East entrance in 2008

- Location in the Berkeley/Oakland area Location in California Location in the United States
- Former names: Men's Gym (1933–1959); Harmon Gym (1959–1997)
- Location: 14 Frank Schlessinger Way; Berkeley, California, U.S.
- Coordinates: 37.8694°N 122.262°W
- Owner: University of California, Berkeley
- Operator: University of California, Berkeley
- Capacity: 11,858 (2015–present); 11,877 (2003–2015); 11,892 (2002–2003); 12,300 (1999–2002); 6,578 (1988–1997); 6,660 (1981–1988); 7,200 (1933–1981)
- Public transit: Downtown Berkeley

Construction
- Groundbreaking: November 1931
- Opened: January 13, 1933; 93 years ago
- Renovated: 1997–1999
- Cost: $727,500 (original) ($18.1 million in 2025) $57.5 million (renovation) ($111 million in 2025)
- Architects: George W. Kelham (Original) Ellerbe Becket (Renovation)
- General contractors: Schuler & McDonald

Tenant
- California Golden Bears (NCAA) (1933–1997, 1999–present)

Walter A. Haas, Jr. Pavilion is an indoor arena on the campus of the University of California, Berkeley. It is the home venue of the Golden Bears men's and women's basketball, women's volleyball, and men's and women's gymnastics teams. The arena is located in the middle of the main sports complex, overlooking Evans Diamond (baseball) and Edwards Stadium (track/soccer).

== History ==
The arena was originally opened 93 years ago in 1933 as the Gymnasium for Men or Men's Gym; it was renamed Harmon Gym in 1959, after Oakland financier A.K.P. Harmon, who donated the funds to build Cal's first indoor athletic facility in 1879. When Lou Campanelli arrived in Berkeley in 1985, he tried to change Harmon's name to Harmon Arena, but it never caught on.

One change Campanelli made that stuck, however, was renaming the playing surface Pete Newell Court in 1987 in honor of head coach Pete Newell, who led Cal to the national championship in 1959. The floor had been known as simply "Room 100" since Harmon opened.

=== Renovation ===
Proposals for replacing the old gym were bandied about from the 1970s onward, but sentiment was strongly in favor of rebuilding it instead. As a result, the arena was heavily renovated from 1997 to 1999 after a donation of about $11 million from Walter A. Haas, Jr. of Levi Strauss & Co., building a new seating bowl within the existing walls.

The new facility retains the intimate atmosphere of its predecessor, while having almost two times the seating capacity at 11,858 (originally 12,300 and later 11,877). In particular, there are no soundproofing devices. The arena contains The Bench, a courtside section that holds approximately 900 student fans. The amount of student seating doubled from the old arena, up to 2,600 from 1,300. It also holds the Pacific-10 Women's Basketball attendance record of 10,525 people, set during a game against rival Stanford University on February 23, 2008.

The renovation, which cost $57.5 million, began after the final home game in March 1997 and was finished for the start of the 1999 season. During the construction, the basketball teams played at both the Kaiser Convention Center and the Oakland Arena in Oakland.

== Notable games ==
On December 22, 2018, the 14th ranked California Bears Women's basketball team faced the number 1 ranked University of Connecticut Huskies Women's basketball team. The Connecticut women's basketball team prevailed 76-66 at Haas Pavilion. The game set attendance records at Haas Pavilion with over 10,000 fans in attendance.

The 2009 men's basketball game between Cal and arch rival Stanford on February 14 was part of a special celebration commemorating the 100th season of Golden Bear basketball, as well as a recognition of the 50th anniversary of Cal's national title in 1959.

On February 28, 2009, ESPN's College Gameday made its first appearance in Berkeley broadcasting live from inside Haas Pavilion for the men's basketball game against the #18 UCLA Bruins. Cal lost despite a large turnout.

On January 21, 2009, Comcast Sportsnet Bay Area's Chronicle Live filmed their show inside Haas for the men's basketball game against Oregon, which Cal would win. Chronicle Live Host Greg Papa also called the play-by-play for the game which was televised on Comcast Sportsnet California.

== Retired jerseys ==
- # 13 - Colleen Galloway (1978–80) Retired February 17, 1981
- # 11 - Kevin Johnson (1984–87) Retired October 22, 1992
- # 4 - Alfred Grigsby (1992–97) Retired March 8, 1997
- # 5 - Jason Kidd (1992–94) Retired February 14, 2004
- # 40 - Darrall Imhoff (1958–60) Retired February 14, 2009
- # 11 - Carli Lloyd (2007-10) Retired October 3, 2025

== See also ==
- List of NCAA Division I basketball arenas
