= El Cerrito del Norte station =

Rapid transit station in San Francisco Bay Area

El Cerrito del Norte
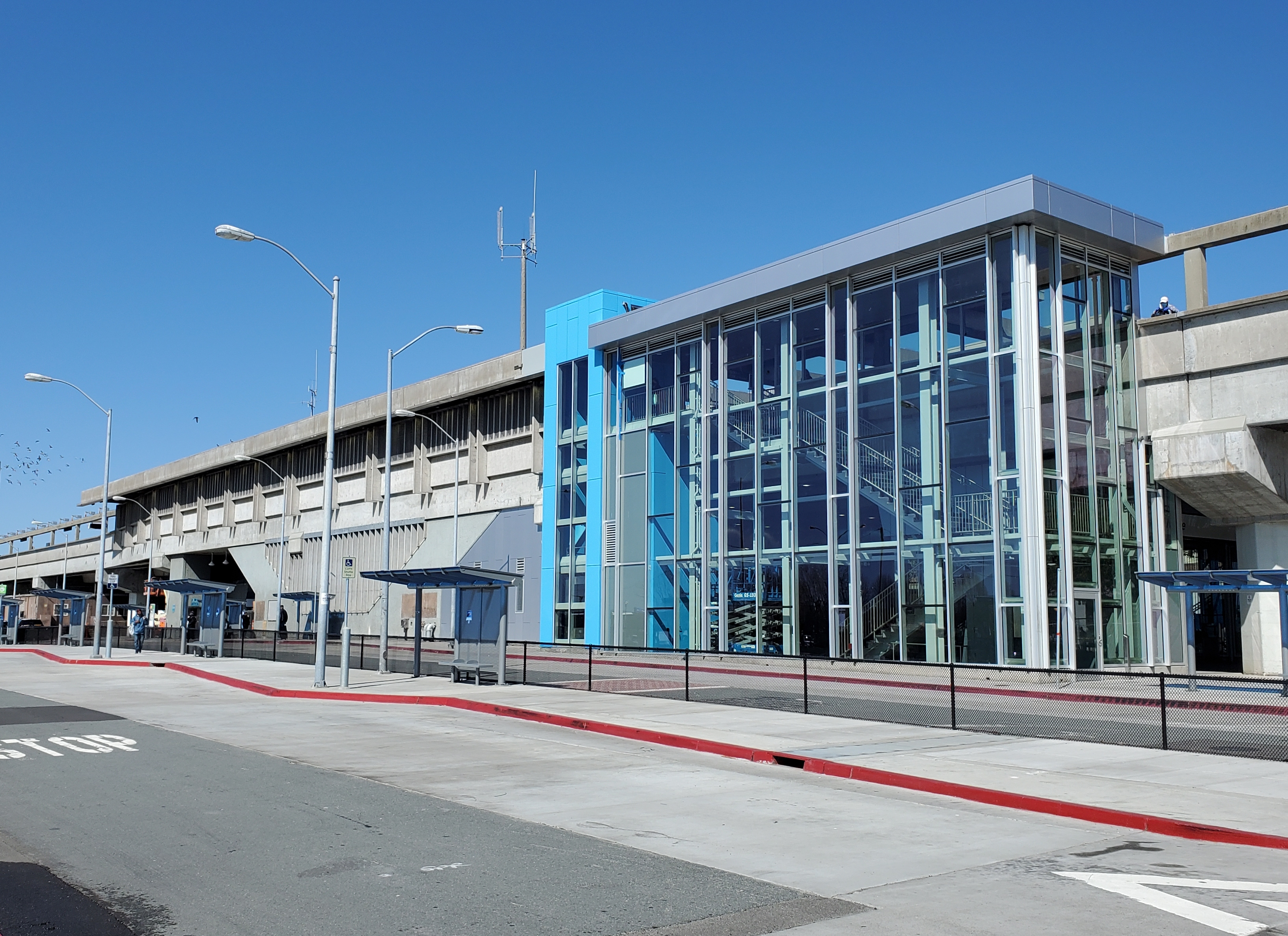
- El Cerrito del Norte station in March 2021

General information
- Location: 6400 Cutting Boulevard; El Cerrito, California
- Coordinates: 37.925183°N 122.316939°W
- Line: BART R-Line
- Platforms: 2 side platforms
- Tracks: 2
- Connections: AC Transit; Golden Gate Transit; SolTrans; VINE; WestCAT

Construction
- Structure type: Elevated
- Parking: 2,198 spaces
- Cycle facilities: 28 lockers
- Accessible: Yes
- Architect: DeMars & Wells
- Architectural style: Brutalist

Other information
- Station code: BART: DELN

History
- Opened: January 29, 1973
- Rebuilt: 2017–March 29, 2021

Passengers
- 2025: 3,901 (weekday average)

Services
Preceding station	Bay Area Rapid Transit	Following station
El Cerrito Plaza toward Berryessa	Orange Line	Richmond Terminus
El Cerrito Plaza toward Millbrae	Red Line	Richmond Terminus
Track layout
Location

El Cerrito del Norte station (Spanish for "The Little Hill of the North") is a Bay Area Rapid Transit (BART) station located on Cutting Boulevard in northern El Cerrito, California. The station is served by the Orange and Red lines. Located near San Pablo Avenue and Interstate 80, it serves as a regional transit hub for local AC Transit bus services, and for commuter feeder services from Solano, Napa, and Marin Counties in the North Bay plus western Contra Costa County. Opened in 1973, the station was renovated in 2017–2021 to add additional elevators, stairs, and lobby space.

The station features large parking areas throughout, including surface parking and a four-story parking garage on the east side. There are also reserved bicycle lockers and open air racks available. There is a kiss and ride and taxi zone on the east side of the station. The Ohlone Greenway runs through the station area.

== History ==
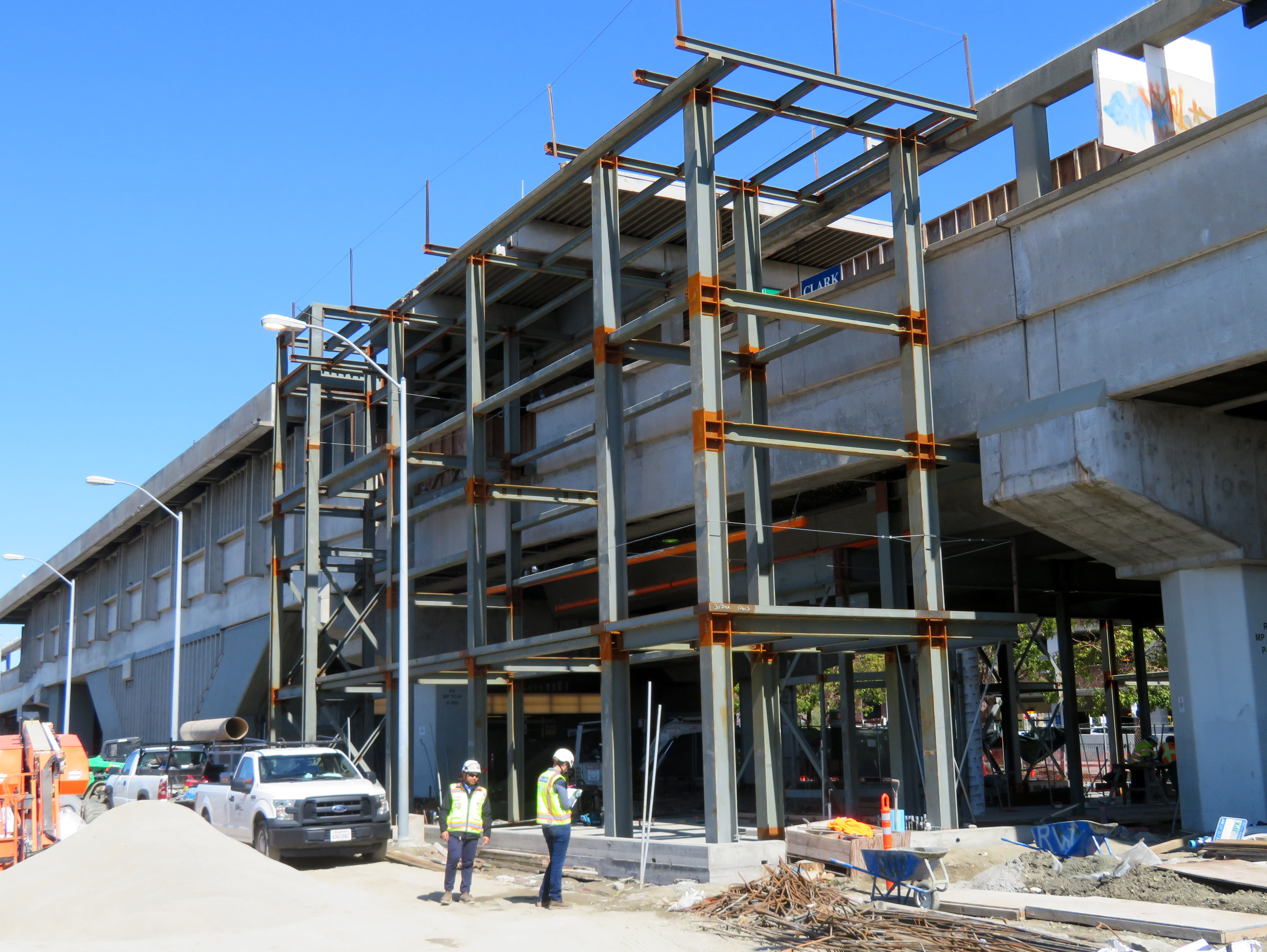
Steelwork for new elevators and stairs seen in March 2019

The BART Board approved the name "El Cerrito del Norte" in December 1965. El Cerrito del Norte station opened on January 29, 1973 when service began between MacArthur station and Richmond station. As with El Cerrito Plaza station, the escalator walls feature tile mosaics by Alfonso Pardiñas. Seismic retrofitting of the parking garage took place in 2010.

A 2004 study recommending expanding the station paid area, platforms, and vertical logistics (more stairs and elevators within the paid area) to allow more passengers to use the station and decrease dwelling times during congested alighting times. Conceptual plans for modernization of the two El Cerrito stations were released in December 2013. By 2017 the station had more than 9,000 passengers boarding per weekday, exceeding its design capacity. BART awarded the construction contract for the $33.9 million station expansion that February, with an expected completion in May 2019.

The expanded paid area, new elevators and stairs, and updated bus boarding area were completed in February 2021. The second phase of the renovation, which included new restrooms and a new busway, was completed on March 29, 2021. It also included the installation of El Cerrito Homes, two porcelain tile murals by artist Kyungmi Shin.

BART developed a station improvement plan in 2004 to create a transit village in the surrounding area. The city of El Cerrito is additionally planning and searching for funds to develop the area around the station as a transit oriented development (TOD) similar to other transit villages, with the reservation that the development must be appropriately scaled. An apartment complex to be built on a former parking area was approved in 2017. As of 2024, BART anticipates soliciting developer proposals by 2028.

== Bus connections ==
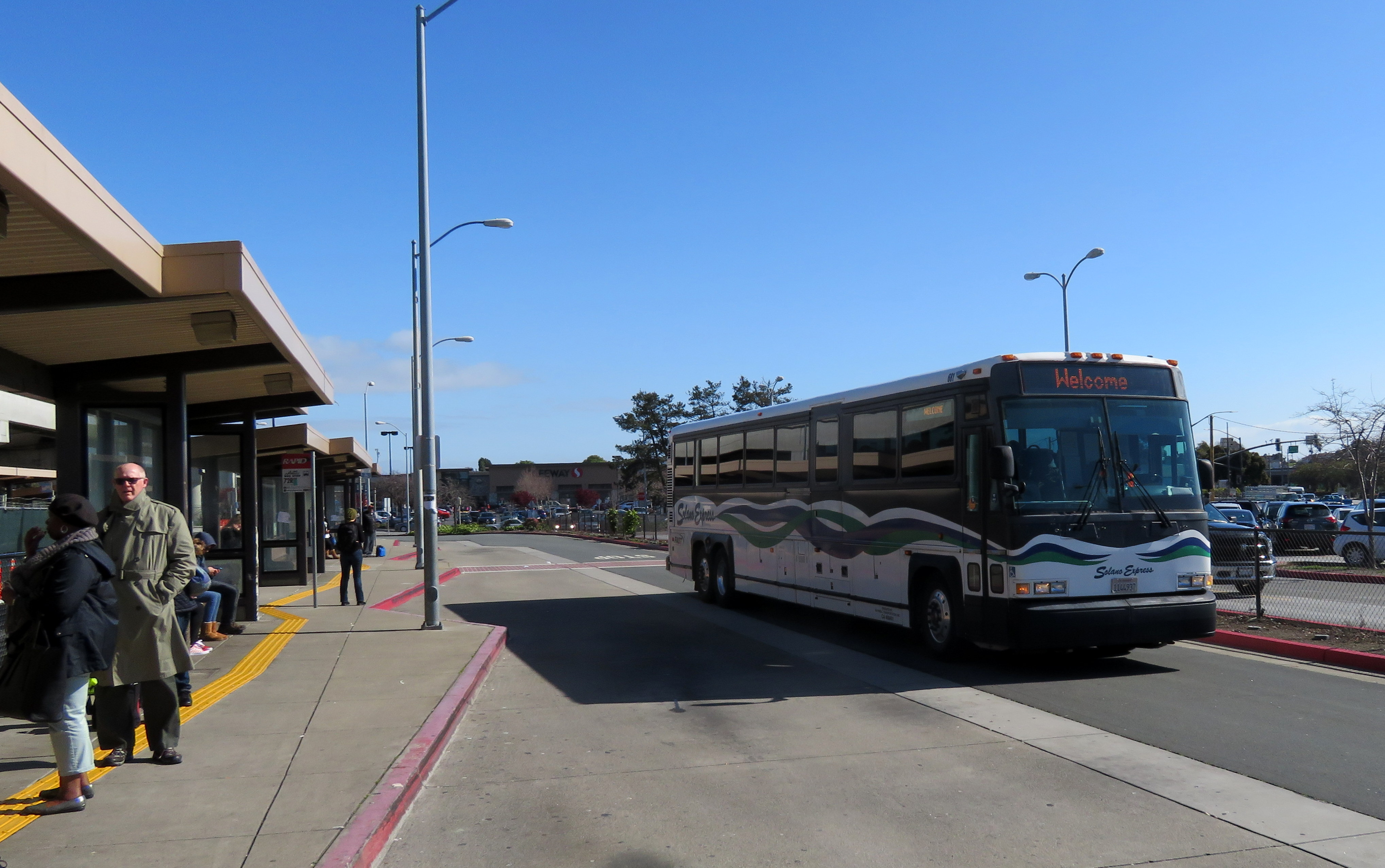
SolanoExpress bus at the station

El Cerrito del Norte station serves as the primary northern bus terminal for the Richmond branch due to its proximity to I-80 (compared to the Richmond BART station). A two-lane busway on the west side of the station, plus additional stops on San Pablo Avenue and on the east side of the station, as are used by five public transit agencies. AC Transit provides both local and express service, while the other agencies provide commuter-oriented express service from western Contra Costa County, Marin County, Napa County, and Solano County.

- AC Transit: 7, 72, 72L, 72M, 70, 76, 667, 800, L
- Golden Gate Transit: 580, 580X, 704
- Napa VINE: 29
- SolanoExpress (SolTrans): Red Line, Green Line
- WestCAT: JL, JPX, JR, JX

Flixbus intercity bus service and a California Department of Public Health employee shuttle also serve the station.
