= El Cerrito Plaza station =

Rapid transit station in El Cerrito, California, US

El Cerrito Plaza
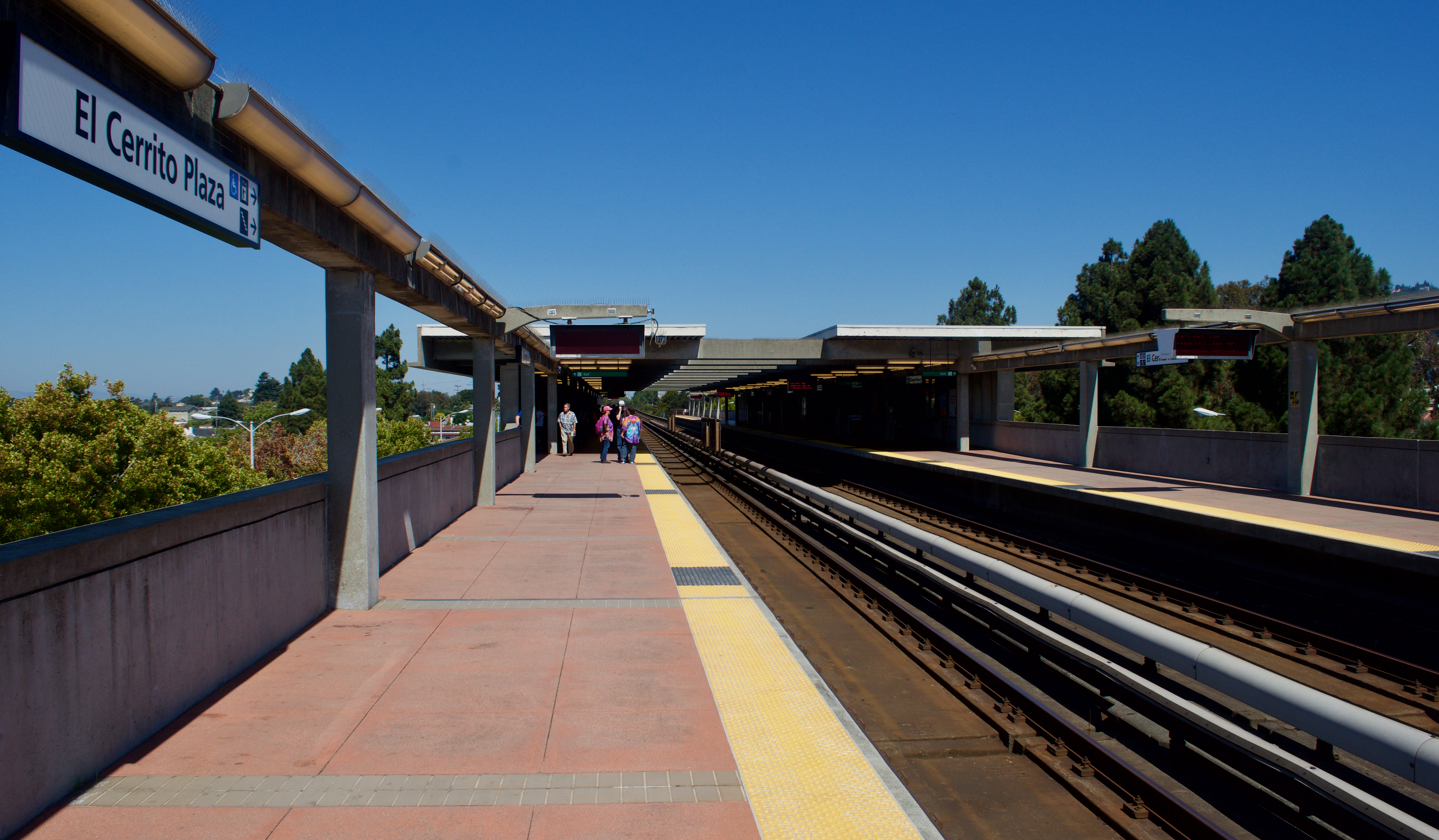
- Platforms at El Cerrito Plaza station in 2017

General information
- Location: 6699 Fairmount Avenue; El Cerrito, California
- Coordinates: 37.902694°N 122.298968°W
- Owner: Bay Area Rapid Transit
- Line: BART R-Line
- Platforms: 2 side platforms
- Tracks: 2
- Connections: AC Transit: 27, 71, 72, 72M, 667, 668, 675, 684, G Bear Transit: RFS

Construction
- Structure type: Elevated
- Parking: 761 spaces
- Cycle facilities: 30 lockers
- Accessible: Yes
- Architect: DeMars & Wells

Other information
- Station code: BART: PLZA

History
- Opened: January 29, 1973

Passengers
- 2025: 2,268 (weekday average)

Services
| Preceding station | Bay Area Rapid Transit | Following station |
|---|---|---|
| North Berkeley toward Berryessa | Orange Line | El Cerrito del Norte toward Richmond |
| North Berkeley toward Millbrae | Red Line | El Cerrito del Norte toward Richmond |
Location

El Cerrito Plaza station is a Bay Area Rapid Transit (BART) station in El Cerrito, California, located adjacent to the El Cerrito Plaza shopping center. It primarily serves southern El Cerrito, northern Albany, and Kensington, along with nearby portions of Berkeley and Richmond. Nearly identical in form to El Cerrito del Norte station, El Cerrito Plaza station has two side platforms serving the line's two elevated tracks, with a fare lobby underneath. The Ohlone Greenway runs through the station area. The station is served by the Orange and Red lines.

== History ==
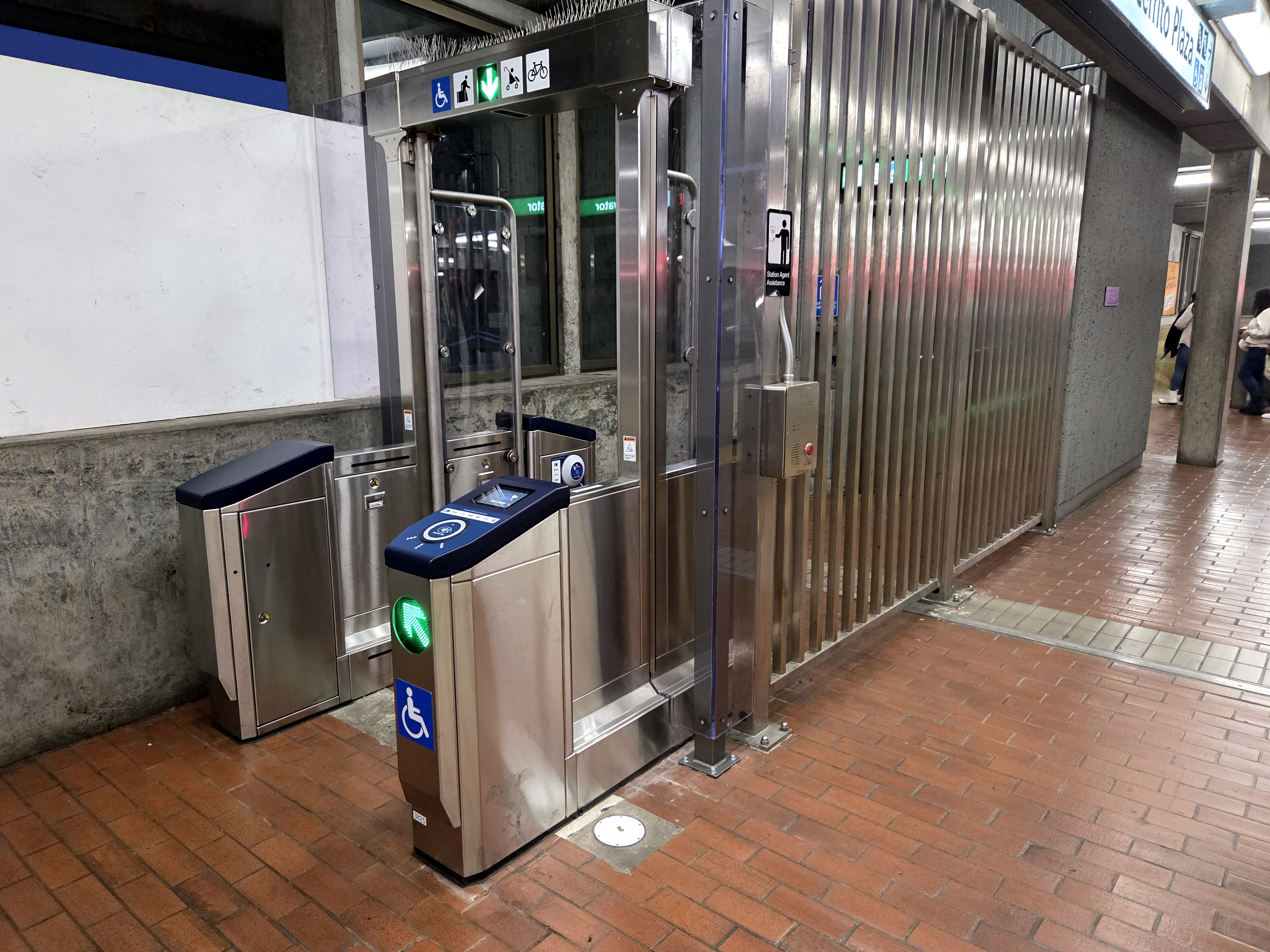
One of the 2022-installed elevator faregates

The BART Board approved the name "El Cerrito Plaza" in December 1965. The station opened on January 29, 1973. As with El Cerrito del Norte station, the escalator walls feature tile mosaics by Alfonso Pardiñas. UC Berkeley music professor Jorge Liderman committed suicide at the station on February 3, 2008. Conceptual plans for modernization of the two El Cerrito stations were released in December 2013. Thirteen BART stations, including El Cerrito Plaza, did not originally have faregates for passengers using the elevator. In 2020, BART started a project to add faregates to elevators at these stations. Two new faregates at El Cerrito Plaza were installed in May 2022.

In 2018, BART and the city of El Cerrito signed a memorandum of understanding to begin planning for transit-oriented development to replace surface parking lots at the station. A developer was chosen in November 2020. A total of six buildings with about 750 residential units are planned. Per BART policy to limit parking replacement at urban stations, BART parking will be reduced from 761 spaces to 145 spaces. The first building was approved by the city in 2023. The north parking lot will close in November 2025 for construction of the first building. Construction of all buildings is expected to take about four years.

== Bus connections ==
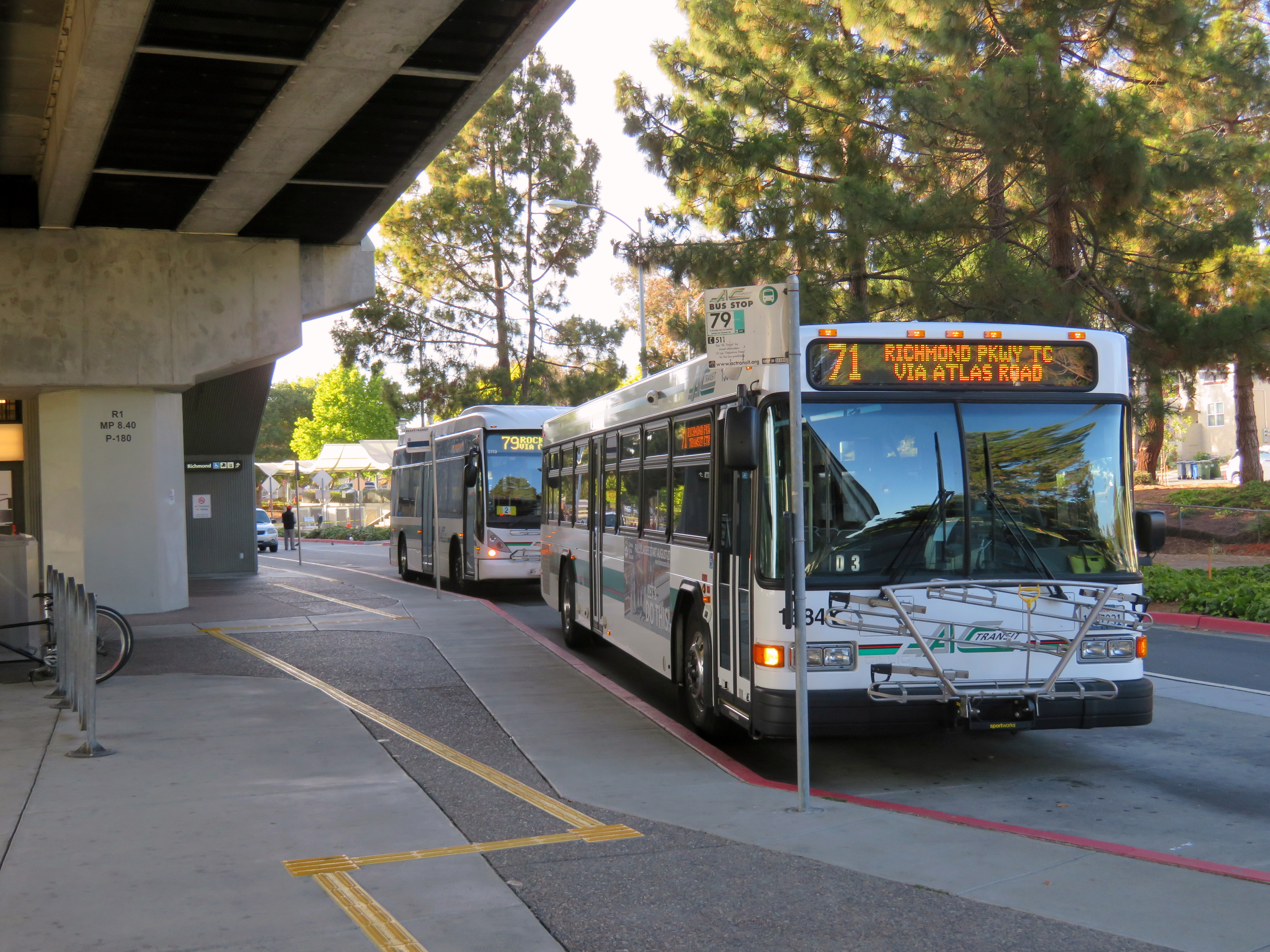
AC Transit buses at the station

Busways on both sides of the station serve a number of AC Transit bus routes:

- Local: 27, 71, 72, 72M
- Transbay: G
- School: 667, 668, 675, 684

The busways are also used by the Bear Transit RFS route. Several other AC Transit routes — including route 72L, Transbay routes L and LC, and All Nighter route 800 — run on San Pablo Avenue 0.25 miles (0.40 km) to the west.
