= Oakland Female Seminary =

Defunct private girls school in California, USA

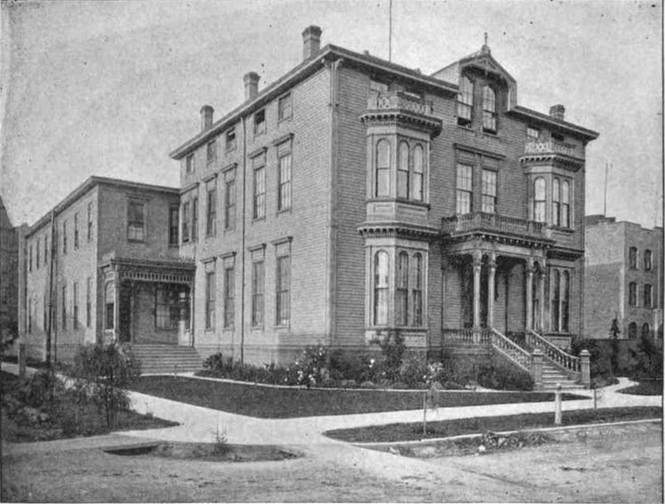

Location
- 528 Eleventh Street; Oakland, California; United States

Information
- Funding type: Private school
- Established: November 8, 1858
- Founder: Millicent Kittredge Blake
- Gender: Girls

Oakland Female Seminary (also Oakland Seminary for Young Ladies) was a private girls' school located in the U.S. state of California. Situated at 528 Eleventh Street in Oakland, it contained 57 rooms. Founded on November 8, 1858, by Millicent Kittredge Blake, it was the first girls' school established west of the Mississippi River. Carrie Stevens Walter was the valedictorian of the first graduating class.
