= Millicent Kittredge Blake =

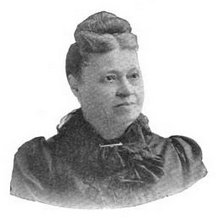
Millicent Kittredge Blake

Millicent Kittredge Blake (alternate spelling, Meliscent; née Millicent Kittredge; January 11, 1822 – November 27, 1907) was a pioneer educator of Oakland, California. She founded the Oakland Female Seminary (a.k.a. Oakland Seminary for Young Ladies; Blake Seminary) on November 8, 1858. It was the first girls school established to the west of the Mississippi River.

== Biography ==
Her birthplace was Essex, New York, upon historic Lake Champlain. She is a descendant on the maternal side, of Cotton Mather, and of those physicians who bear the name of Kittredge. She married George Mansfield Blake, mayor of Oakland, and business partner of her brother, Francis Kittredge Shattuck.

She studied and became a teacher. After a successful management of private schools in her native State, she came to Oakland in 1852, and as soon as its growth warranted the venture, her seminary for young ladies was opened. Although discouraged by friends, who considered success impossible in so new a country, Blake kept steadily on, and eventually succeeded in establishing her school. For half a century, Blake was a big factor in the educational work of the county, not only in her work of founding and maintaining the seminary, but also in the work of founding and building up the University of California, and other western institutions of education. Her husband gave to the state the first ten acres which formed part of the campus of the university.

She died at her home in Blake Seminary, Oakland, November 27, 1907.
