= Downtown Berkeley station =

Metro station in Berkeley, California, US

Downtown Berkeley
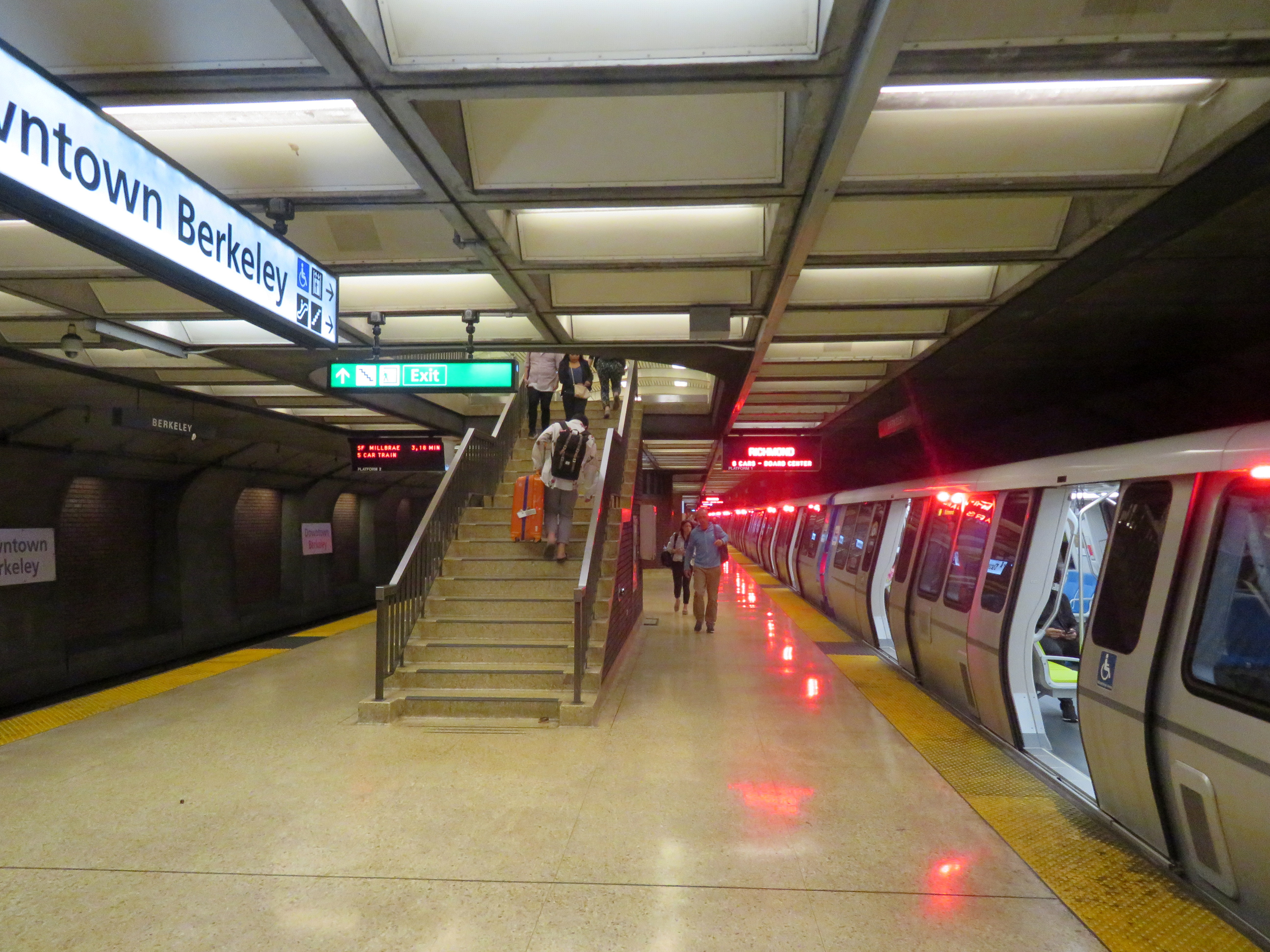
- Richmond-bound train at Downtown Berkeley in June 2019

General information
- Location: 2160 Shattuck Avenue; Berkeley, California
- Coordinates: 37.869799°N 122.268197°W
- Line: BART R-Line
- Platforms: 1 island platform
- Tracks: 2
- Connections: AC Transit: 6, 7, 18, 22, 27, 51B, 52, 65, 67, 88, 800, 851, F, FS; Bear Transit: C, H, P, R, RFS

Construction
- Structure type: Underground
- Cycle facilities: Station
- Accessible: Yes
- Architect: Maher & Martens

Other information
- Station code: BART: DBRK

History
- Opened: January 29, 1973
- Rebuilt: 2016–2018
- Former names: Berkeley (1973–1996)

Passengers
- 2025: 7,129 (weekday average)

Services
Preceding station	Bay Area Rapid Transit	Following station
Ashby toward Berryessa	Orange Line	North Berkeley toward Richmond
Ashby toward Millbrae	Red Line	North Berkeley toward Richmond
Location

Downtown Berkeley station is an underground Bay Area Rapid Transit (BART) station in the Downtown Berkeley section of Berkeley, California. It is served by the Orange and Red lines.

== Station layout ==
Like most underground BART stations, Downtown Berkeley has two levels: a mezzanine containing the faregates and an island platform with two tracks. Access to the station is provided by five street-level entrances on Shattuck Avenue, with two at Addison Street and Allston Way each and one at the southwest corner of Shattuck Avenue and Center Street.

== History ==
=== Southern Pacific ===
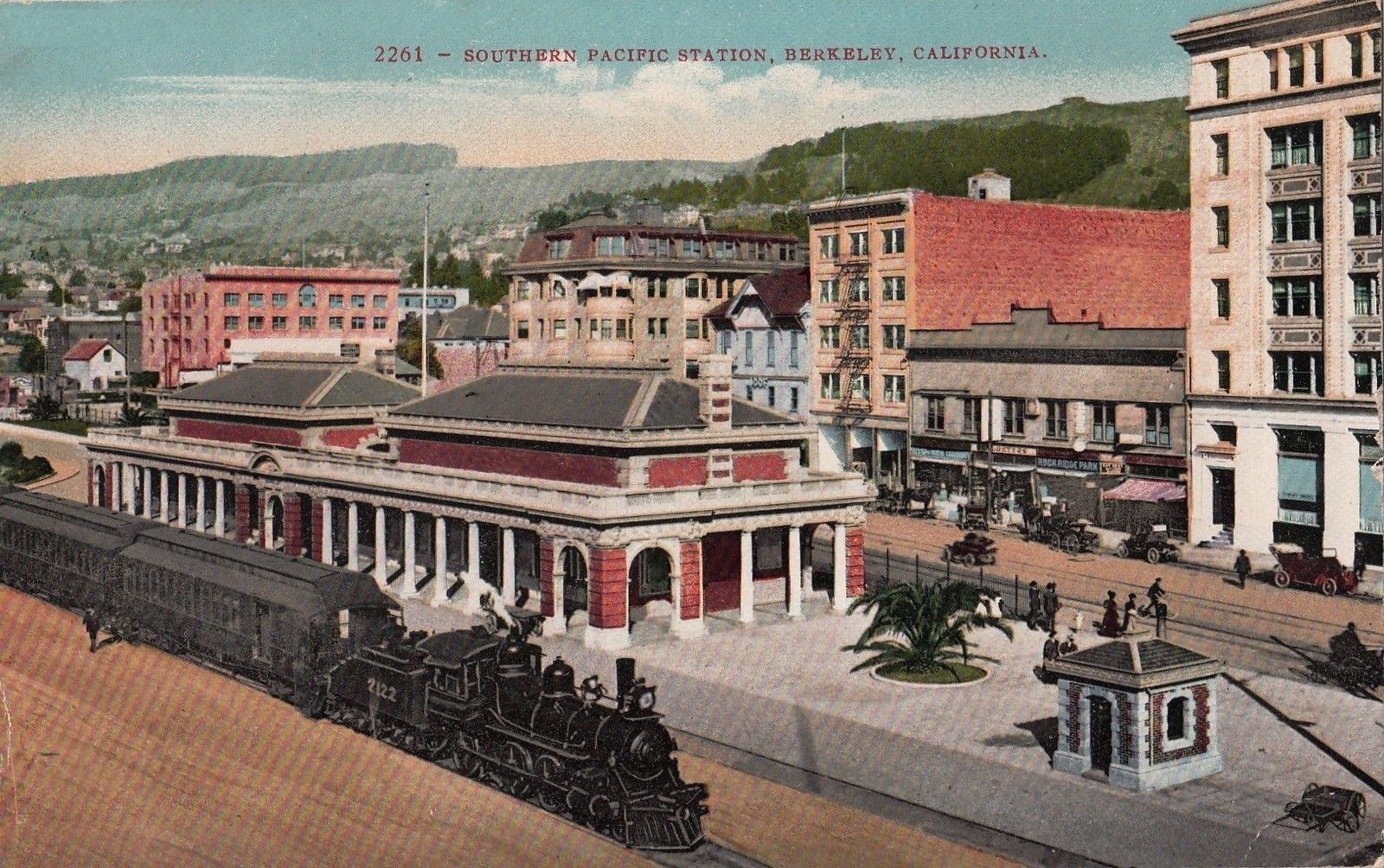
Postcard view of the 1908-built station

The Central Pacific Railroad opened its Berkeley Branch Railroad to the intersection of Shattuck and University Avenues on August 16, 1876. Early civic leader Francis K. Shattuck donated land for the railroad and its depot, and subsidized the initial construction. Berkeley was the terminus of the line until 1878, when it was extended northwest along Shattuck. The Central Pacific was leased by the Southern Pacific Railroad (SP) in 1885, then transferred to its Northern Railway subsidiary in 1888. The first Berkeley station was a small wooden building at the northwest corner of Center Street and Shattuck; it was replaced in the 1890s by a slightly larger by still modest station.

On October 26, 1903, the Key System began electric commuter rail operation from Berkeley to the San Francisco ferries – a direct threat to the SP's steam-hauled trains – on a line that paralleled the SP tracks on Shattuck. Around that time, Cal president Benjamin Ide Wheeler and other prominent Berkeley academics lobbied SP president E. H. Harriman for an improved train station to complement John Galen Howard's emerging architectural style for the nearby University of California, Berkeley. Finally, the devastating 1906 earthquake and subsequent rebuilding "served as a powerful incentive to expedite the project".

Surveying work began in June 1906; that September, SP management announced their intentions to convert their suburban lines to a frequent electric service to compete with the Key System. The new station, an elegant red brick structure with buff terracotta trim, red tile roof, and a colonnade, opened on April 9, 1908. It was officially designed by SP architect Daniel J. Patterson in a similar style to Émile Bénard's original plans for the university, though the high quality of its design and circumstantial evidence led some historians to believe it was actually designed by Howard. The SP lines were fully electrified in 1911.

=== BART ===
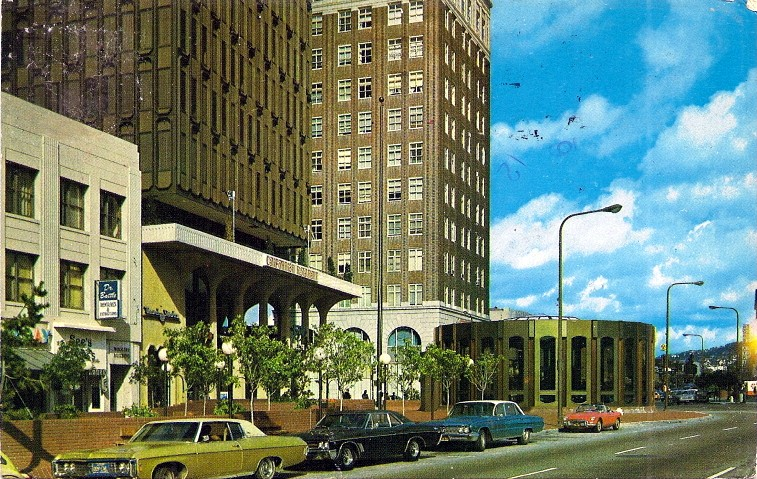
Entrance to the Berkeley BART station (bottom right) as seen shortly after the station opened in 1973

The BART Board approved the name "Berkeley" in December 1965. The station opened on January 29, 1973, as part of the extension from MacArthur to Richmond. The station was designed by Maher & Martens of San Francisco in collaboration with Parsons Brinckerhoff, Tudor Construction, and Bechtel. The main entrance was topped by an 24-sided rotunda featuring artwork of the UC Botanical Garden.

In May 1996, the BART board voted to the name of the station from "Berkeley" to "Downtown Berkeley". The name change was at the request of the Berkeley City Council with the aim of distinguishing it from the two other stations in Berkeley.

==== Headhouse reconstruction ====
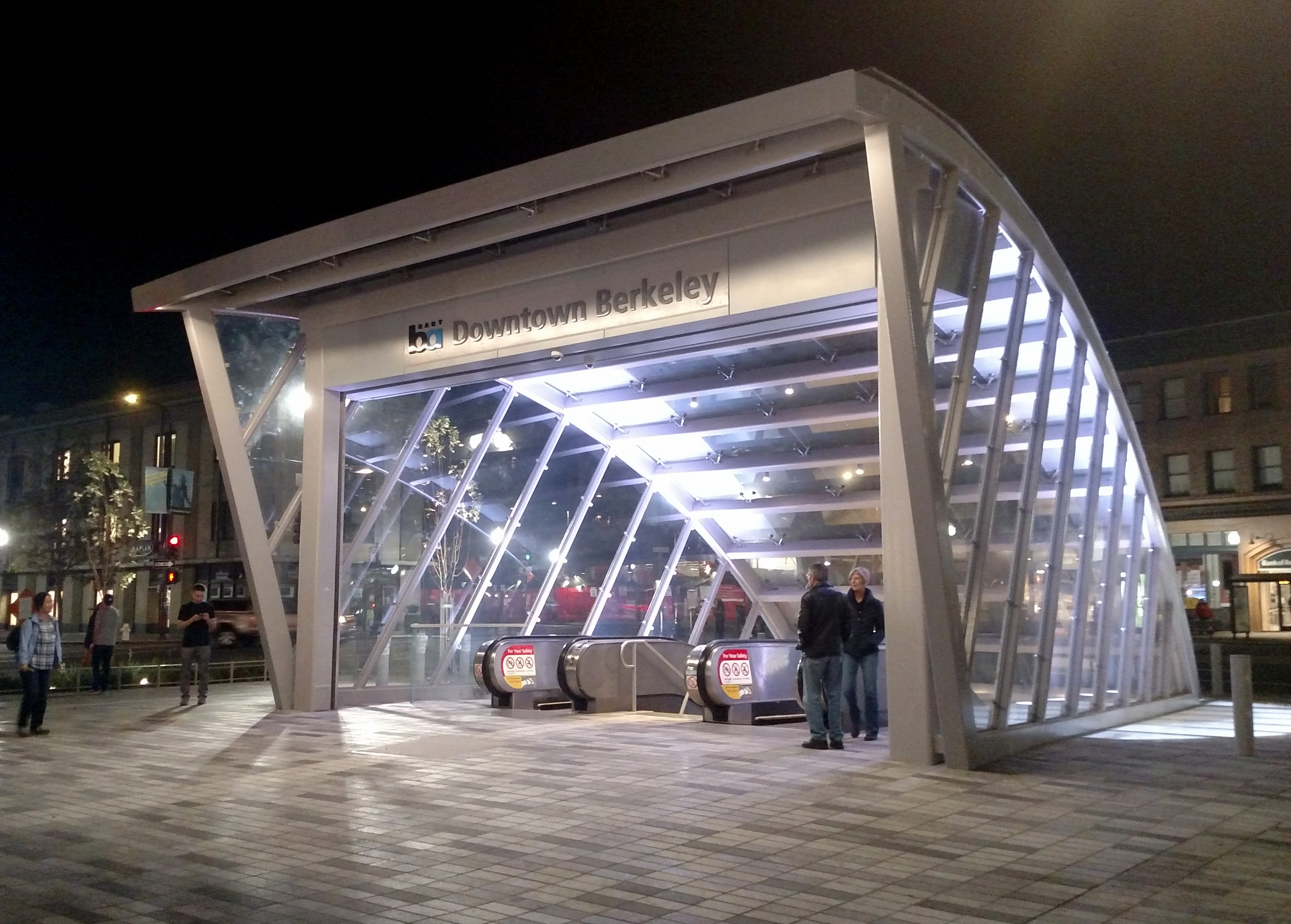
New main entrance to the station

A station and plaza renovation project began construction on August 29, 2016 and opened to the public on October 19, 2018. The new plaza includes new lighting, landscaping, drainage, paving, and bus shelters in the overground plaza of the station. The old main rotunda entrance has been removed and was replaced by a glass entrance structure similar to those in Downtown Oakland. The $11.2 million project is funded primarily by BART, with additional funding from the City of Berkeley, Metropolitan Transportation Commission, and Alameda County. A further project to renovate the underground station interior is in the planning stages.

The entrances on the southern end of the station were closed from April 13, 2020, to June 12, 2021, due to low ridership during the COVID-19 pandemic. Bathrooms at underground BART stations were closed after the September 11 attacks due to security concerns. The bathroom at Downtown Berkeley station reopened on June 30, 2023, after a renovation, with an attendant on duty during all operating hours.
