= Bear Transit =

Bus service operated by University of California, Berkeley

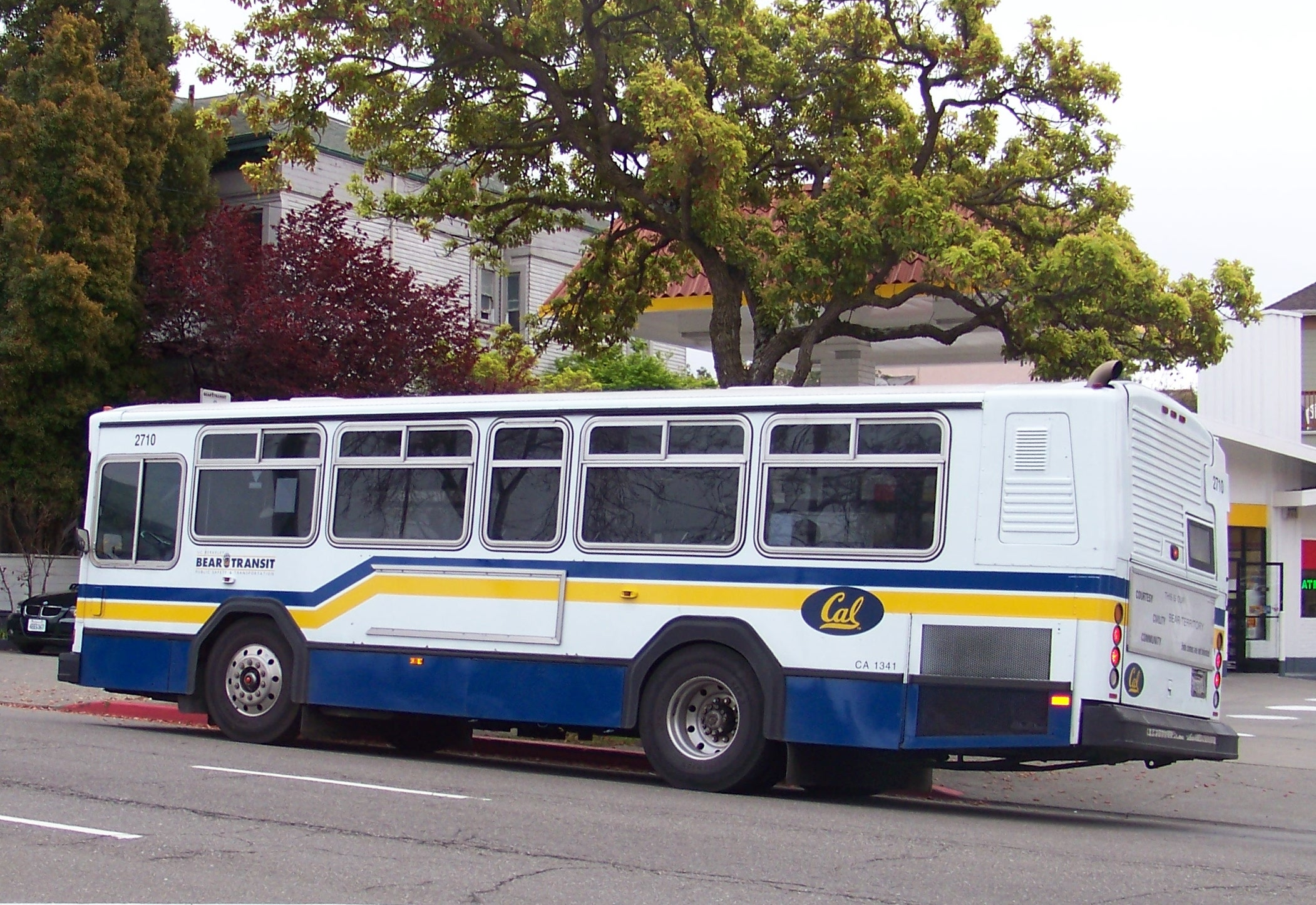
- Locale: Berkeley, CA
- Service area: University of California, Berkeley, Campus Bay, Richmond, California
- Service type: Shuttle bus service
- Routes: Daytime: 4, Nighttime: 2
- Hubs: Downtown Berkeley BART, Hearst Mining Circle
- Fleet: Cutaway Buses
- Operator: Parking & Transportation of UC Berkeley

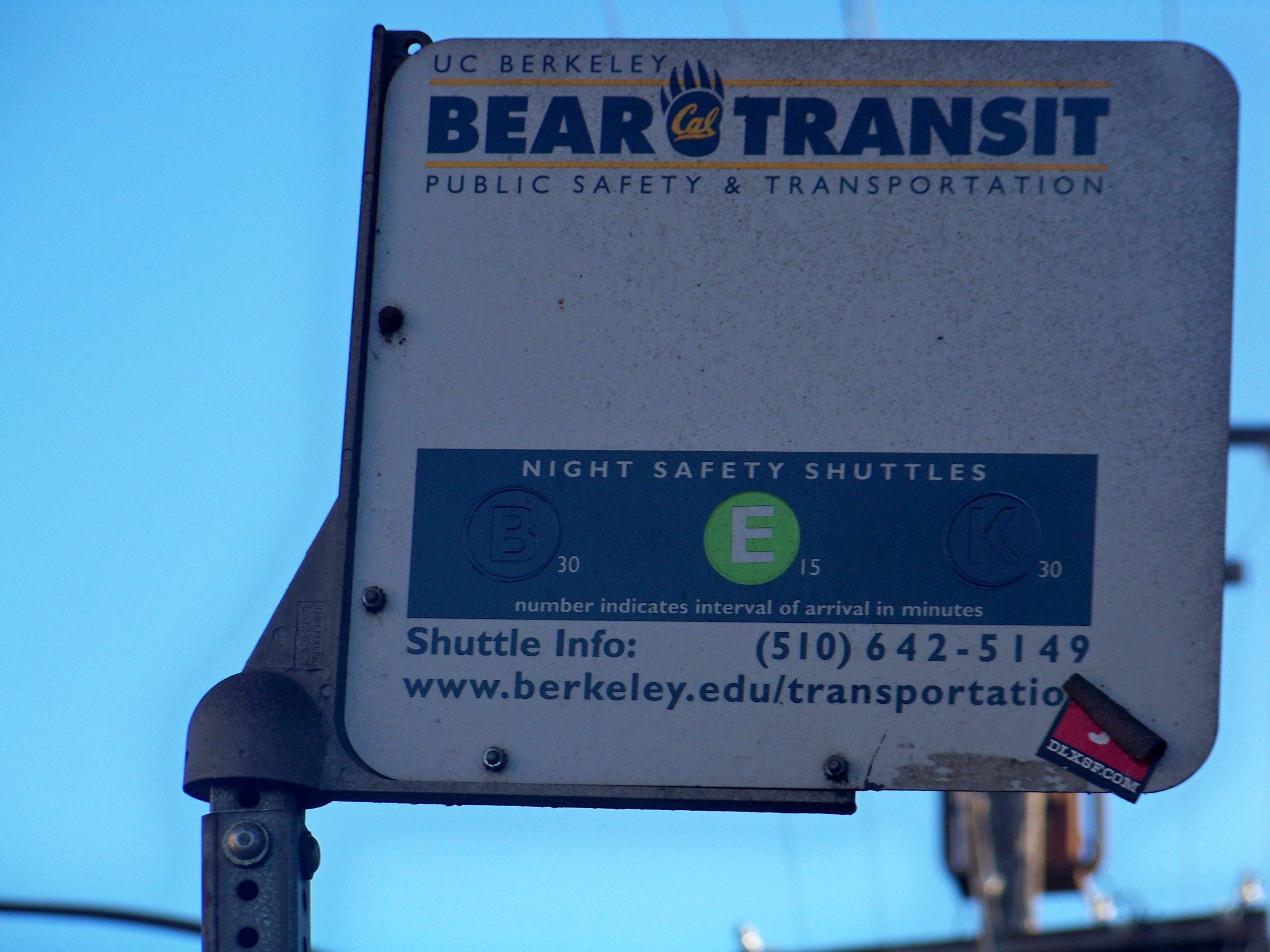

Bear Transit is the bus service operated by the Department of Parking and Transportation of the University of California, Berkeley. Its fleet includes a combination of shuttle vans and passenger buses (22', 35', and 40' cutaway buses), provided by MV Transit.

Prior to 2017, all of its passenger buses formerly owned by AC Transit. In the early 2000s the passenger buses used were refurbished by AC Transit.

Bear Transit connects various areas of the university, including student housing, the main campus, the Hill area, Downtown Berkeley (including Berkeley BART), and distant locations such as Lawrence Hall of Science in the East Bay Hills and the Clark Kerr Campus south of the main campus.

== Routes and services ==
Daytime (Operates weekdays only)

- Perimeter (P Line, operates clockwise, from Downtown Berkeley - uphill on Hearst, downhill on Bancroft)
- Reverse Perimeter (R Line, operates counterclockwise - uphill on Channing, downhill on Hearst)
- Hill (H Line, connects the main campus, Botanical Gardens, and Lawrence Hall of Science)
- Central Campus via Hearst (C Line, operates peak hours only - uphill on Hearst, downhill on University Drive)

Nighttime (Operates seven days a week)

- Night Safety North (N Line) - Operates Clockwise from BART
- Night Safety North (S Line) - Operates Counterclockwise from BART

Pandemic related changes

In 2020, due to the pandemic, low ridership and high operating costs, service to the Richmond Field Station (RFS), a research facility also owned by the University, located in Richmond, was eliminated.

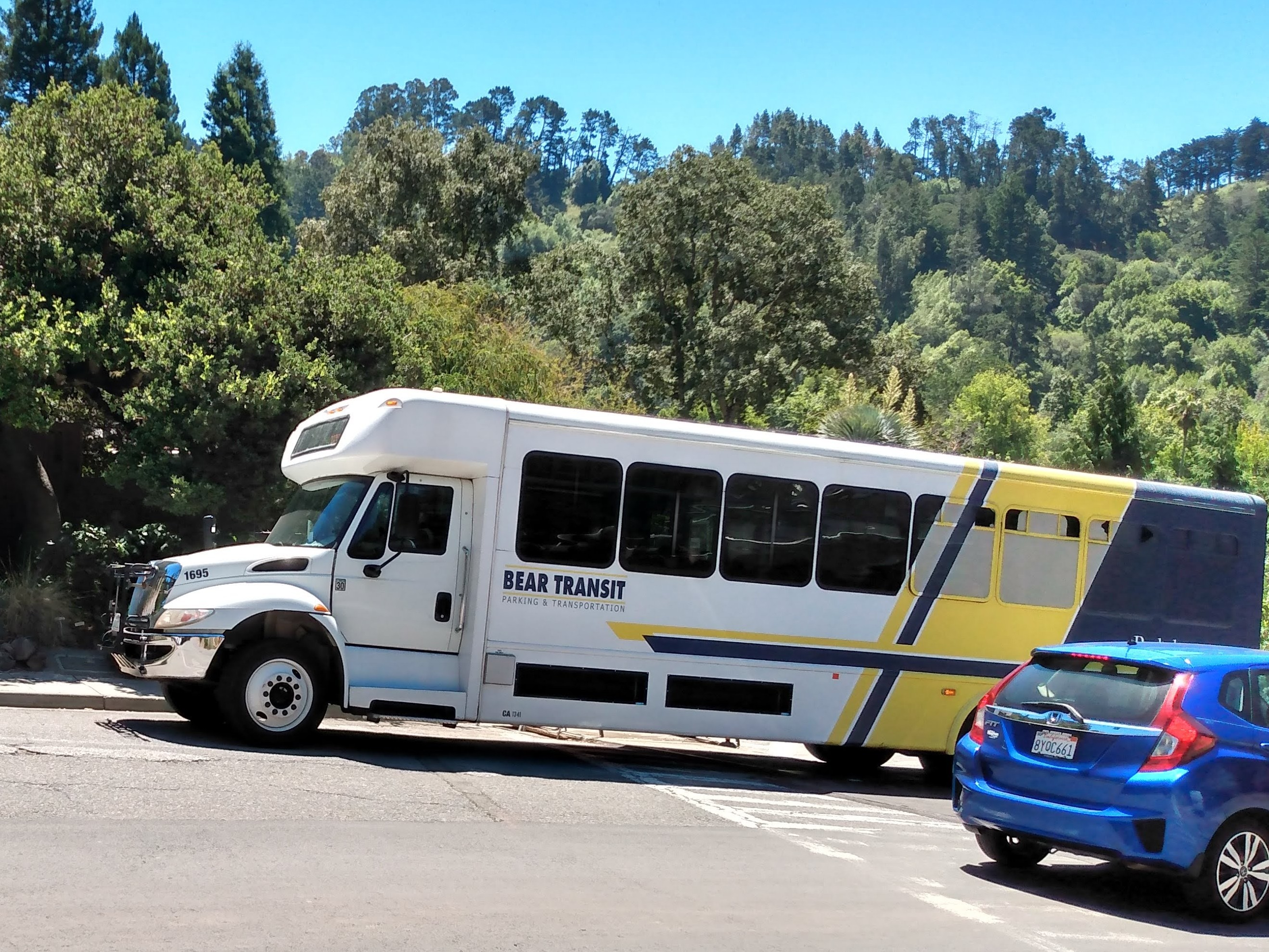
Bear Transit bus in front of the UC Botanical Garden in 2023.

In 2020, due to the pandemic, Campus Shared Services, an employee-only shuttle which served North Berkeley BART and an offsite facility in the 4th Street District of Berkeley, was suspended.

Also in 2020, the Associated Students of the University of California (ASUC, the student body), voted to add the Reverse Perimeter route. This route, unlike its clockwise companion, the Perimeter Line, provides staggered 15 minute departures from the Berkeley BART Station during the day (P-Line leaving at :00 and :30 after the hour; R-Line leaving :15 and :45 after).

On all Cal football home games, game day shuttles carry students and visitors to the California Memorial Stadium two hours before and one hour after games start. Return service after the games, though, is limited.

== See also ==
- Unitrans — transit system serving University of California, Davis
