= Shattuck Hotel =

Historic building in Berkeley, California, U.S.

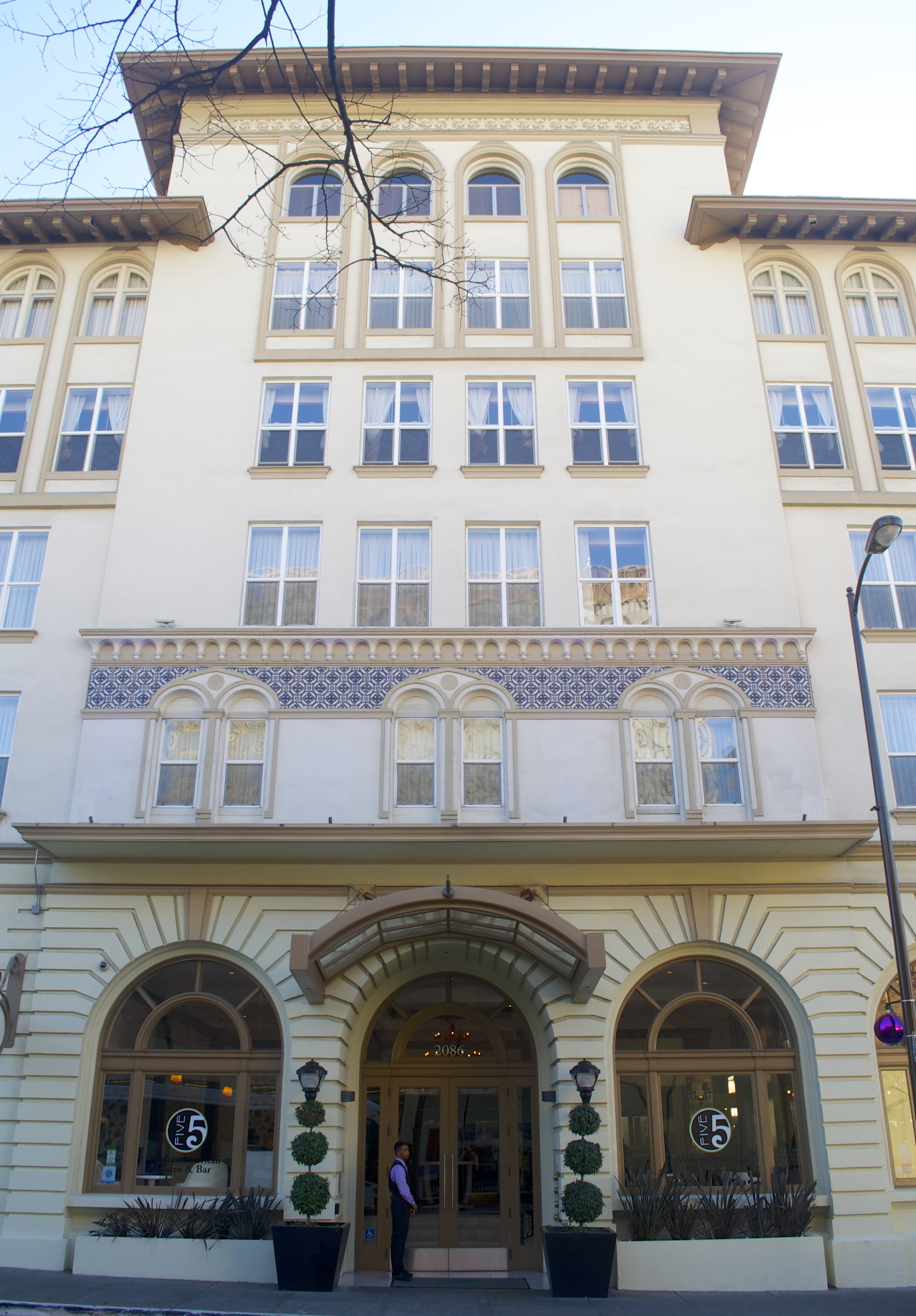
- Interactive map of the Shattuck Hotel area

General information
- Architectural style: Mission Revival
- Location: 2086 Allston Way, Berkeley, California, USA
- Coordinates: 37°52′09.1″N 122°16′06.5″W
- Opened: December 1910; 115 years ago

Technical details
- Material: Reinforced steel and concrete

Design and construction
- Architect: Benjamin McDougall

Other information
- Number of rooms: 180
- Number of suites: 19

Website
- hotelshattuckplaza.com

Shattuck Hotel is a historic building located on the corner of Shattuck Avenue and Allston Way in Downtown Berkeley. Opened in December 1910, the building is located near the site of the Victorian estate of gold seeker and builder Francis K. Shattuck. It has been a City of Berkeley landmark since 1987. The building is primarily a hotel that has been operated under names including Hotel Whitecotton and Hotel Shattuck Plaza, and its first floor annex was the longtime site of the J.F. Hink and Son Department Store.

== Architectural style ==
Construction on the site began in 1909. Built by architect Benjamin McDougall, who is also credited with creating the Berkeley YMCA building, the building was built in the Mission Revival Style that is apparent in its square corner turrets and arched windows. The building was made from reinforced steel and concrete and when built, was purported to be fireproof. Furnishings were supplied by the W. & J. Sloane of San Francisco.

In 1914, an annex was added to the hotel to accommodate the crowds expected for the 1915 Panama Pacific International Exposition in San Francisco. In 1926 a covered arcade was built on the ground floor of the annex. The construction tripled the size of the original six-story building, adding 120 rooms for a total of 300. Commercial space on the ground floor of the annex was occupied by the J.F. Hink and Son Department Store for over seventy years.

== Ownership ==
Building development was initiated by Francis K. Shattuck's widow, Rosa Shattuck. After the death of Rosa Shattuck in 1908, the Shattuck estate was deeded to her niece, Rosa Livingstone Woolsey. In 1910 W.E. Woolsey, Rosa Livingstone's husband, was cited as the hotel's owner with Noah W. Gray as its manager.

From 1918 to 1942, the hotel was operated as the Hotel Whitecotton Hotel in honor of its then-owner, William Whitecotton. In 1926, Whitecotton leased the hotel to Whitecotton Realty Company which reorganized in 1934 into the Shattuck Properties Corporations. Levi Strauss Realty Co., bought the hotel from the Shattuck Properties Corporation in 1941 and leased it to Durant Hotel owners Wallace and Joan Miller. In 1942, the Millers reverted the hotel's name to Shattuck Hotel and moved the entrance from Shattuck Avenue to Allston Way.

In 2007, the hotel was purchased by BPR Properties, renovated, and renamed Hotel Shattuck Plaza.
