= Carrie Stevens Walter =

American educator and poet

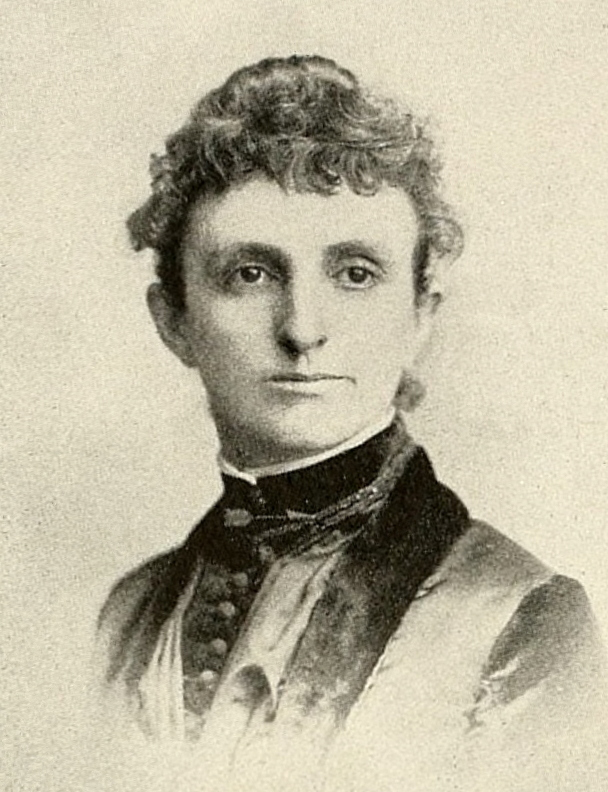
"A Woman of the Century"

Carrie Stevens Walter (April 27, 1846 – April 26, 1907) was an American educator and poet who was a co-founder of the Sempervirens Club, a California environmental organization. She was heavily involved in the purchase of the Santa Cruz Big Basin by the State. She first visited the Big Basin as one of a sizable party. Her second trip was made to Santa Cruz, Pescadero, and La Honda, California. Both trips were written up in an instructive way. Her expenses and that of her party on that trip were paid by a few residents of Santa Cruz. Beyond expenses, she received no compensation.

== Early life and education ==
Carrie Stevens was born in Savannah, Missouri, the oldest of six children. She moved to the Pacific coast with her parents ten years later and lived in California thereafter. She inherited poetic talent from her father, Josiah E. Stevens, and showed early leaning toward literary pursuits. She was educated at the Oakland Female Seminary and was valedictorian of the first graduating class of that institution. Some of her poems had already found their way into leading periodicals of the West Coast.

== Career ==
Walter made her home in Santa Clara County. She was a teacher for two decades before turning her attention to literature. In 1886, her book An Idyl of Santa Barbara was published. She also wrote newspaper and magazine articles, advertisements, commercials, short stories, and serials. She served as city editor of the Morning Times. Her poems, which were collected under the title, Rose Ashes, were widely read.

In the late 19th century, California's ancient redwood forests were being logged heavily. A group including Stanford University President David Starr Jordan determined to protect the remaining redwoods, and at their initial meeting, Walter was appointed to a committee tasked with surveying the extent of the problem. This group became the Sempervirens Club, and one result of their lobbying efforts was California Redwood Park, later renamed Big Basin Redwoods State Park.

Walter was a member of the Pacific Coast Women's Press Association, and a charter member of the San Jose Woman's Club. She was a close friend of Bret Harte and Ina Coolbrith.

== Death ==
Walter died April 26, 1907, in San Jose, California, after being ill two weeks with pneumonia. Three children survived her.

== Selected works ==
- An Idyl of Santa Barbara (1886)
- The Early California Missions (1890)
- Rose-ashes, and Other Poems (1890)
- Souvenir of Leland Stanford Jr. University (1893)
- Hotel Vendome, San Jose, California (1894), about Hotel Vendome
- In California's Garden: Santa Clara Valley (1897)
- Santa Clara Valley (1897)
- Santa Clara County, California (1904)
