= Daniel J. Patterson =

American architect

Daniel James Patterson (often referred to simply as D.J. Patterson) was an American architect around the turn of the 20th century. Much of his work was done for the Southern Pacific Railroad.

Patterson was born in Jefferson County, New York in 1857, the second of six children born to Tomkins and Susan Patterson. His father was a carpenter by trade. He grew up in Minnesota and received his college training at the University of Minnesota. After college, he moved to Seattle, Washington, to work as a draftsman for Willis Ritchie. His most notable designs during this time in the Pacific Northwest included the Old Capitol Building in Olympia, and the courthouses in Spokane, Whatcom, and Port Townsend. He also designed a number of public school buildings.

In 1889, Patterson moved to San Francisco to establish a practice there. His work caught the attention of the Southern Pacific Railroad (SP), which had its headquarters in San Francisco. They had him design a number of their stations and other facilities, many of which survive. Among these were the San Antonio Station, Berkeley Station (1906), the Salt Lake City Union Station, the Tucson Station, and the Willits depot. He was also the architect for the Union Station (1911) in Seattle, Washington. He designed three of the SP's hospitals, in San Francisco, El Paso, and Houston, as well as many of the railroad's industrial structures, such as electrical sub-stations and the Alameda Shops.

Although most of his work in San Francisco was done for the SP railroad, Patterson maintained his practice on behalf of other clients. One of these was himself. He designed his own home which still stands on Divisadero Street. He also designed a large 4-story house for Jeremiah and Elizabeth Burke in Berkeley, California. The house has been preserved as the landmarked Burke House which has served for many years as the home of the Judah L. Magnes Museum, a museum of Jewish history in the American west.

== Gallery ==
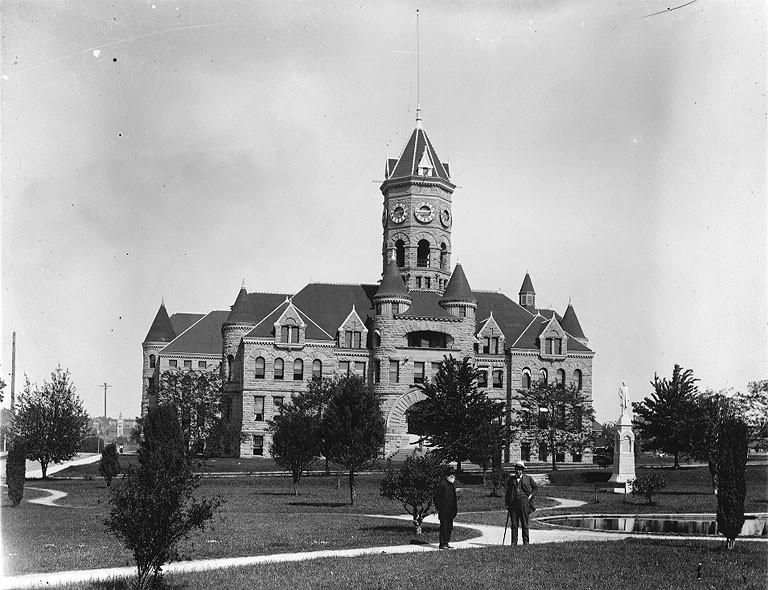
Old State Capitol Building, Olympia, Washington

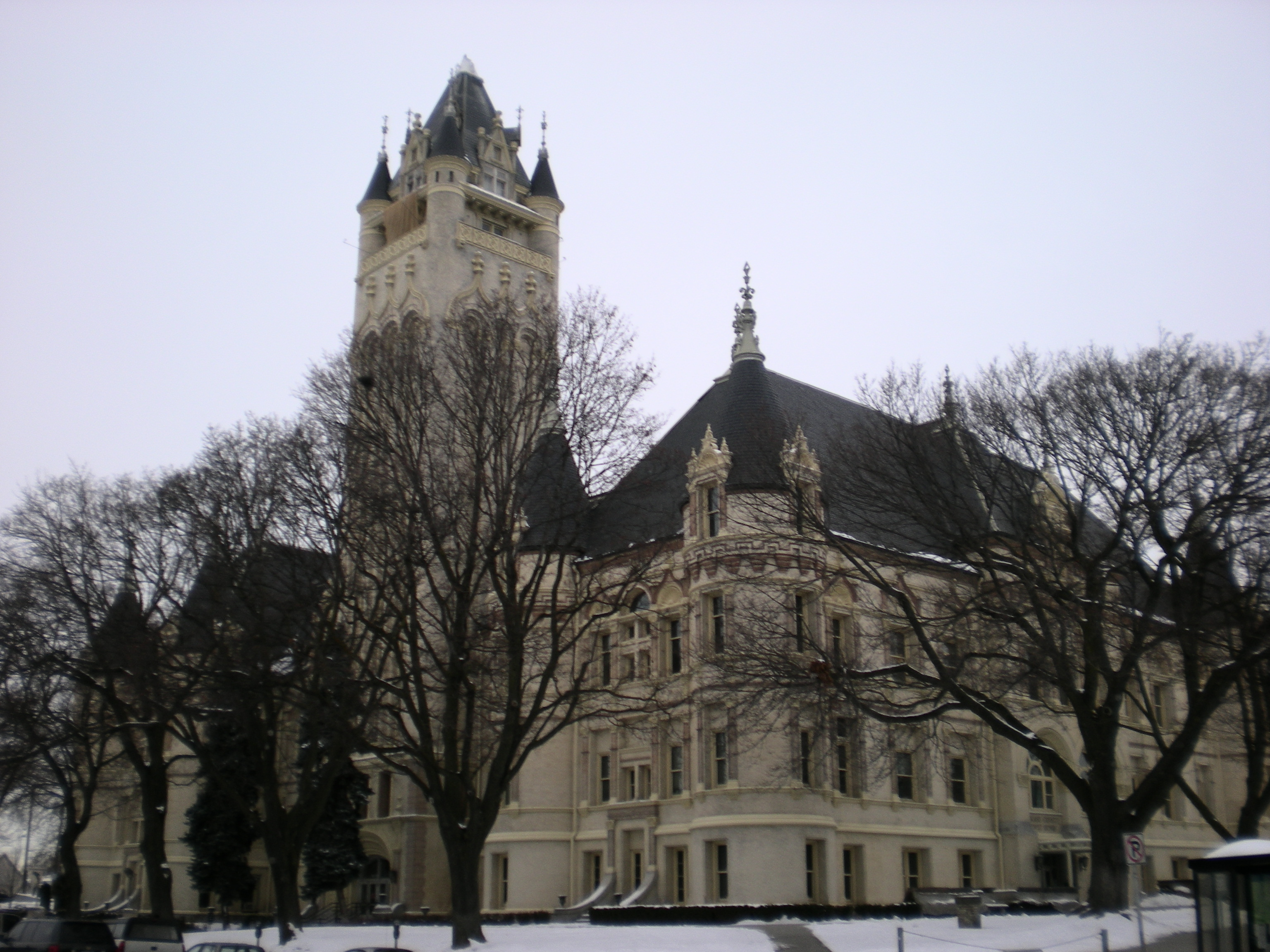
Spokane County Courthouse, Washington

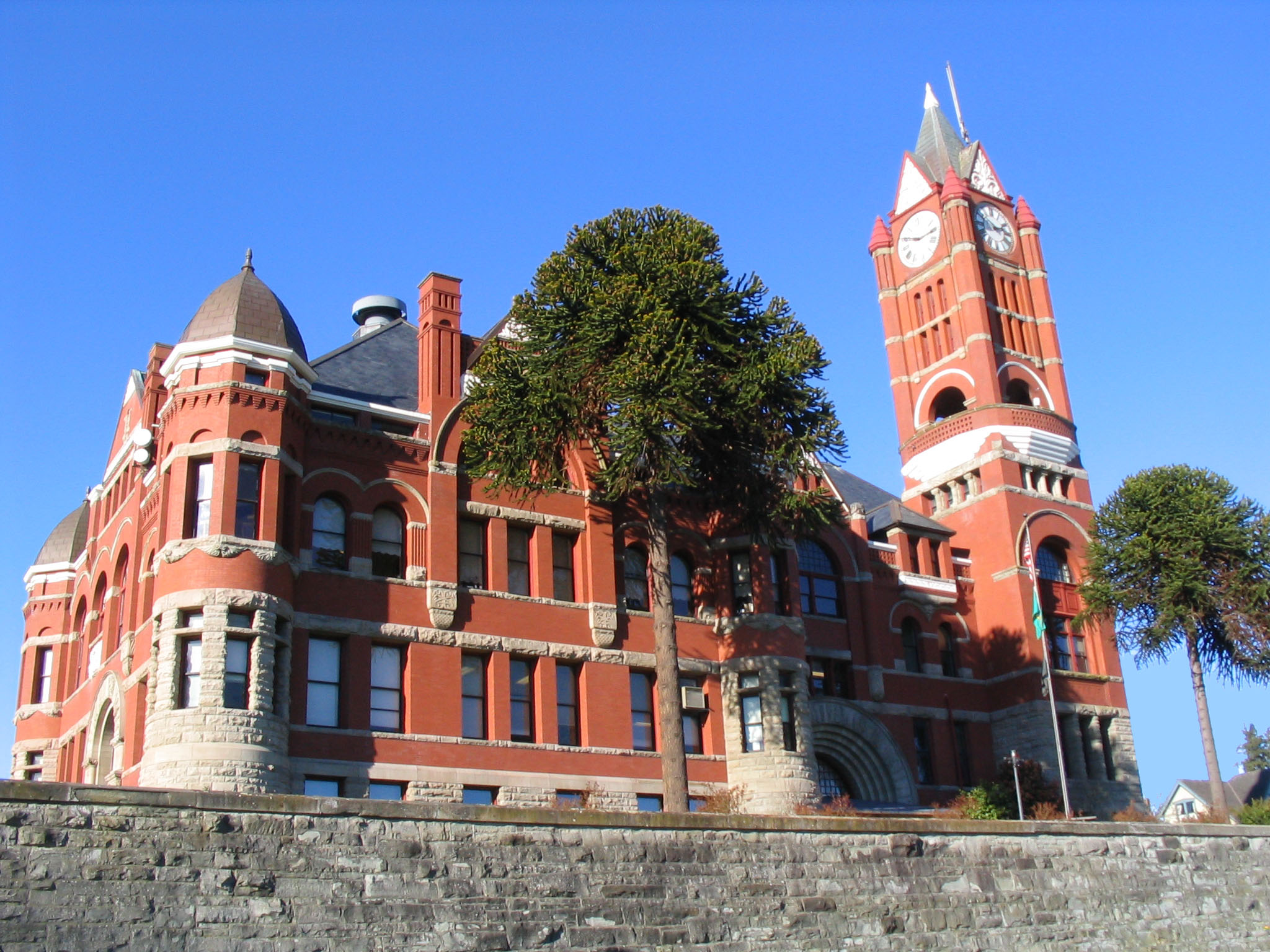
Jefferson County Courthouse, Port Townsend, Washington

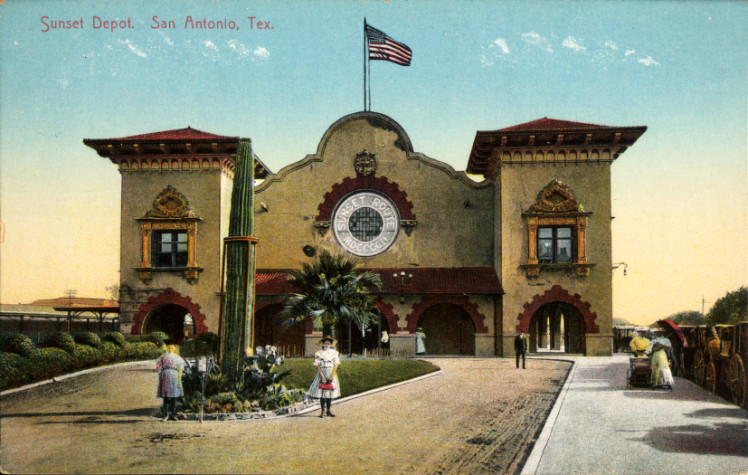
Sunset Depot, Southern Pacific Railroad, San Antonio, Texas

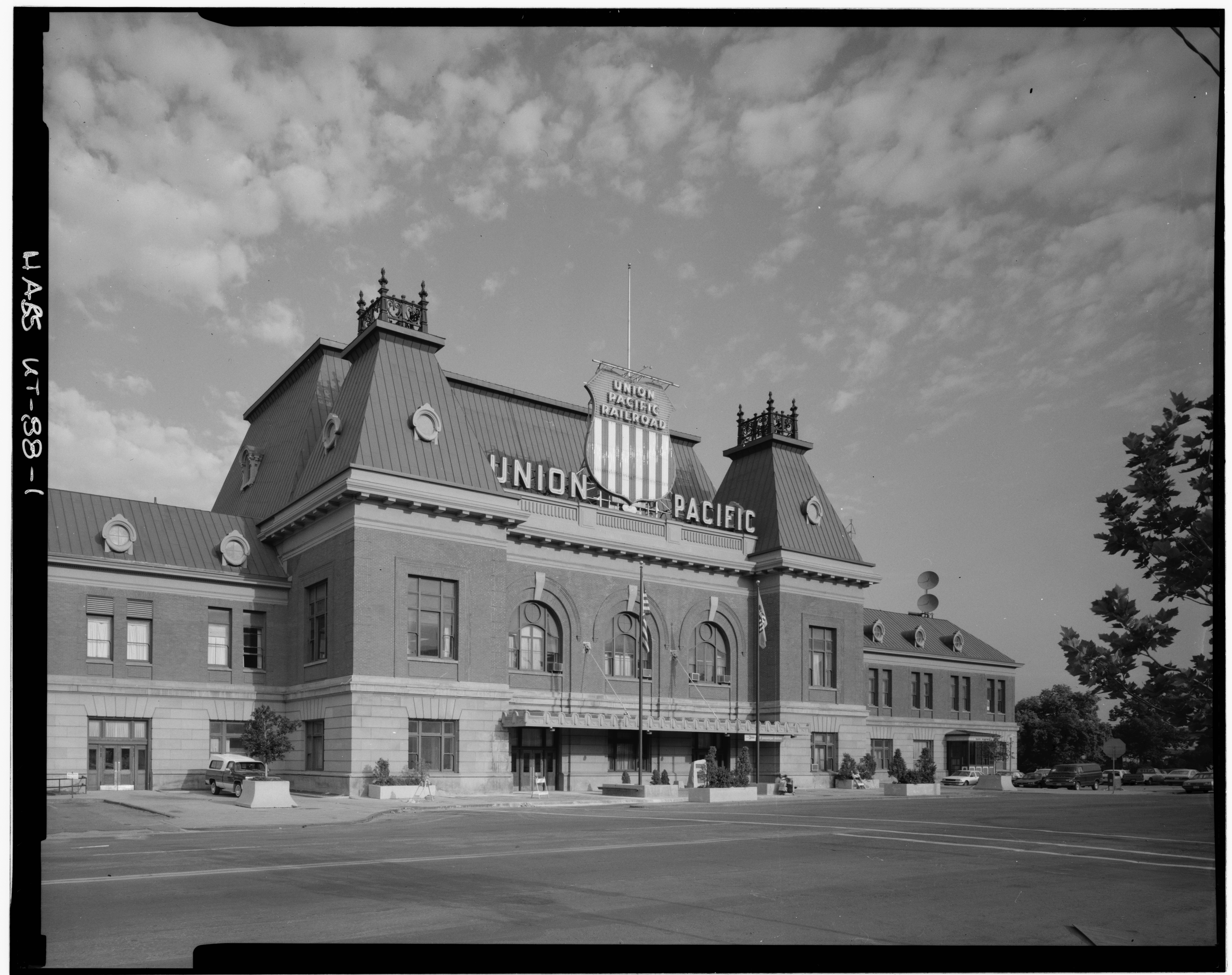
Union Station, Salt Lake City, Utah

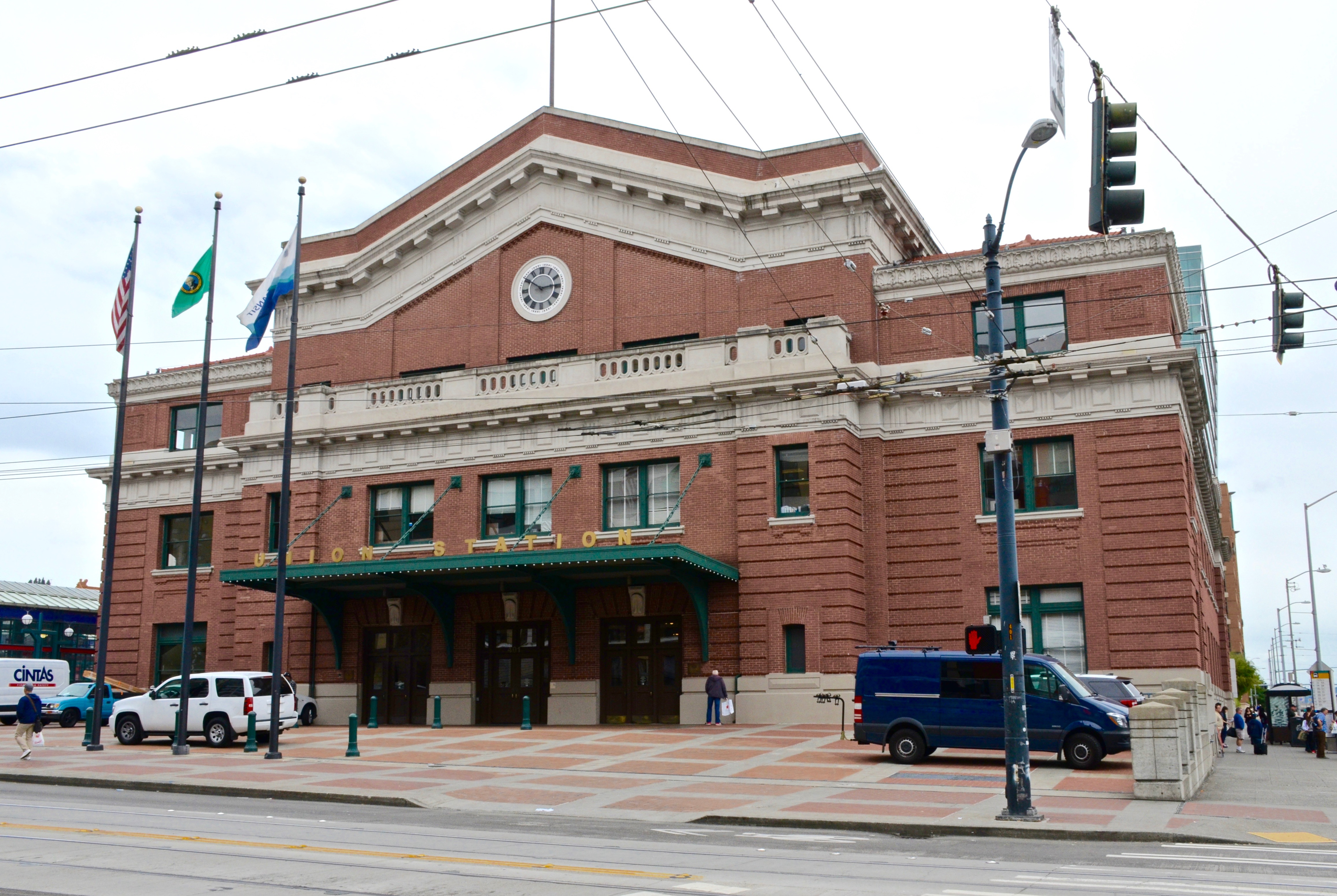
Union Station, Seattle, Washington

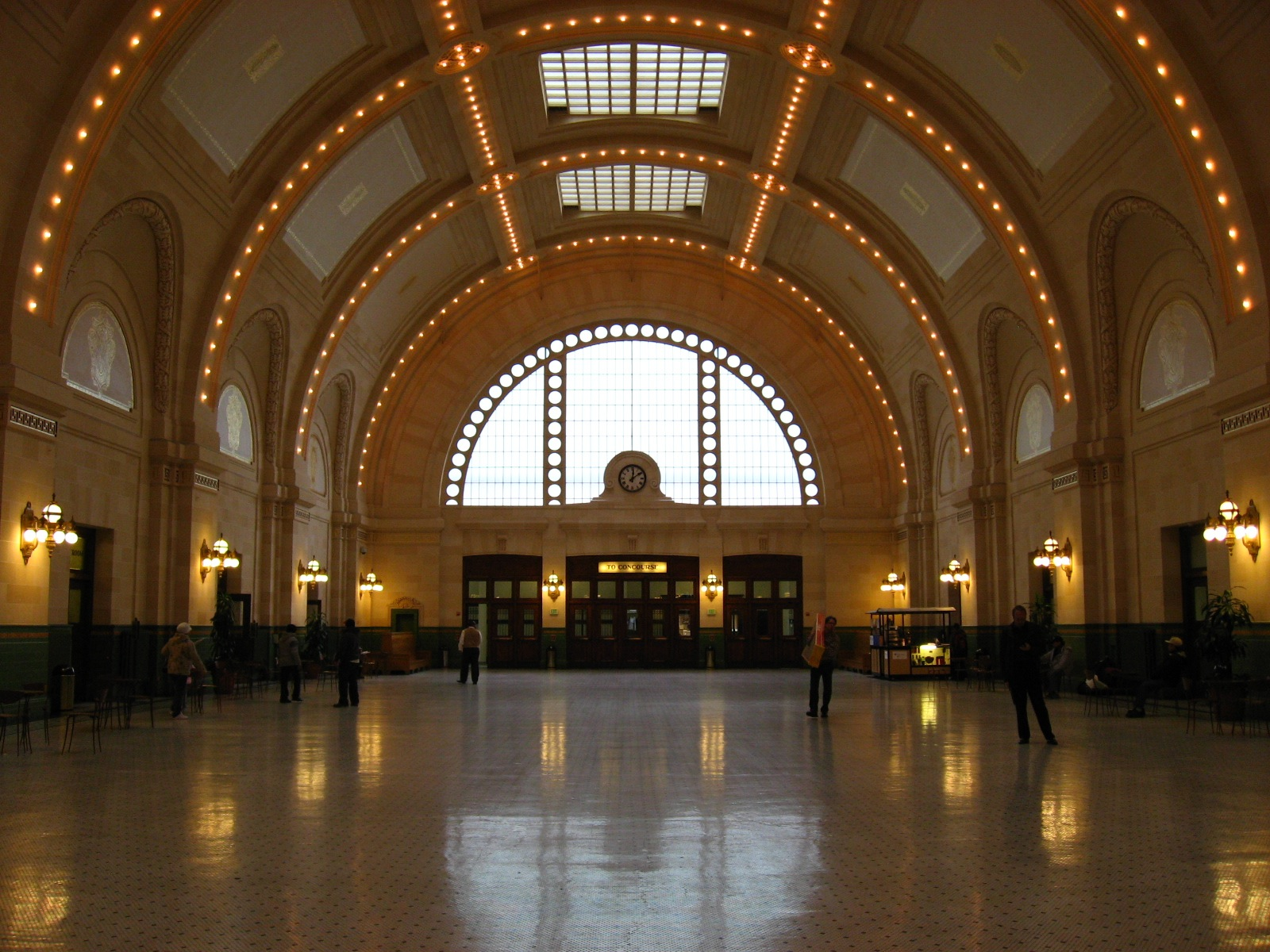
Union Station interior, Seattle, Washington
