= North Berkeley station =

Metro station in Berkeley, California, US

North Berkeley
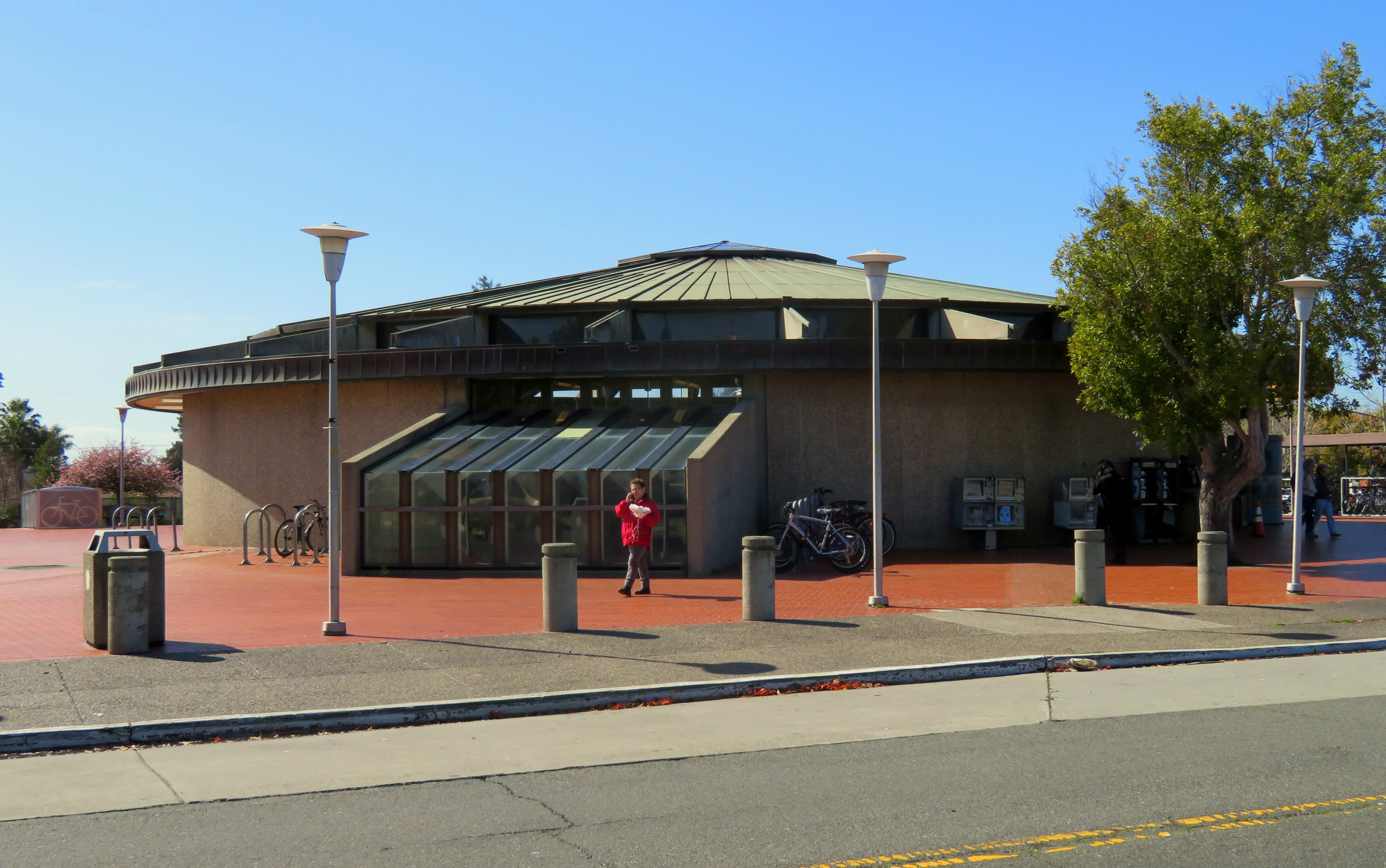
- The circular headhouse of North Berkeley station

General information
- Location: 1750 Sacramento Street; Berkeley, California
- Coordinates: 37°52′26″N 122°16′57″W
- Line: BART R-Line
- Platforms: 1 island platform
- Tracks: 2
- Connections: AC Transit: FS, J, 51B, 52, 88, 604, 688, 800; Golden Gate Fields Shuttle

Construction
- Structure type: Underground
- Parking: 822 spaces
- Cycle facilities: 58 lockers
- Accessible: Yes
- Architect: Kitchen & Hunt

Other information
- Station code: BART: NBRK

History
- Opened: January 29, 1973

Passengers
- 2025: 2,006 (weekday average)

Services
Preceding station	Bay Area Rapid Transit	Following station
Downtown Berkeley toward Berryessa	Orange Line	El Cerrito Plaza toward Richmond
Downtown Berkeley toward Millbrae	Red Line	El Cerrito Plaza toward Richmond
Location

North Berkeley station is an underground Bay Area Rapid Transit (BART) station located in the North Berkeley neighborhood of Berkeley, California. It is bounded by Virginia Street, Sacramento Street, Delaware Street, and Acton Street in a residential area north of University Avenue. The main station entrance sits within a circular building at the center of a parking lot, while an elevator between the surface and the platform is located at the parking lot's Sacramento Street edge. The station is served by the Orange and Red lines.

== History ==
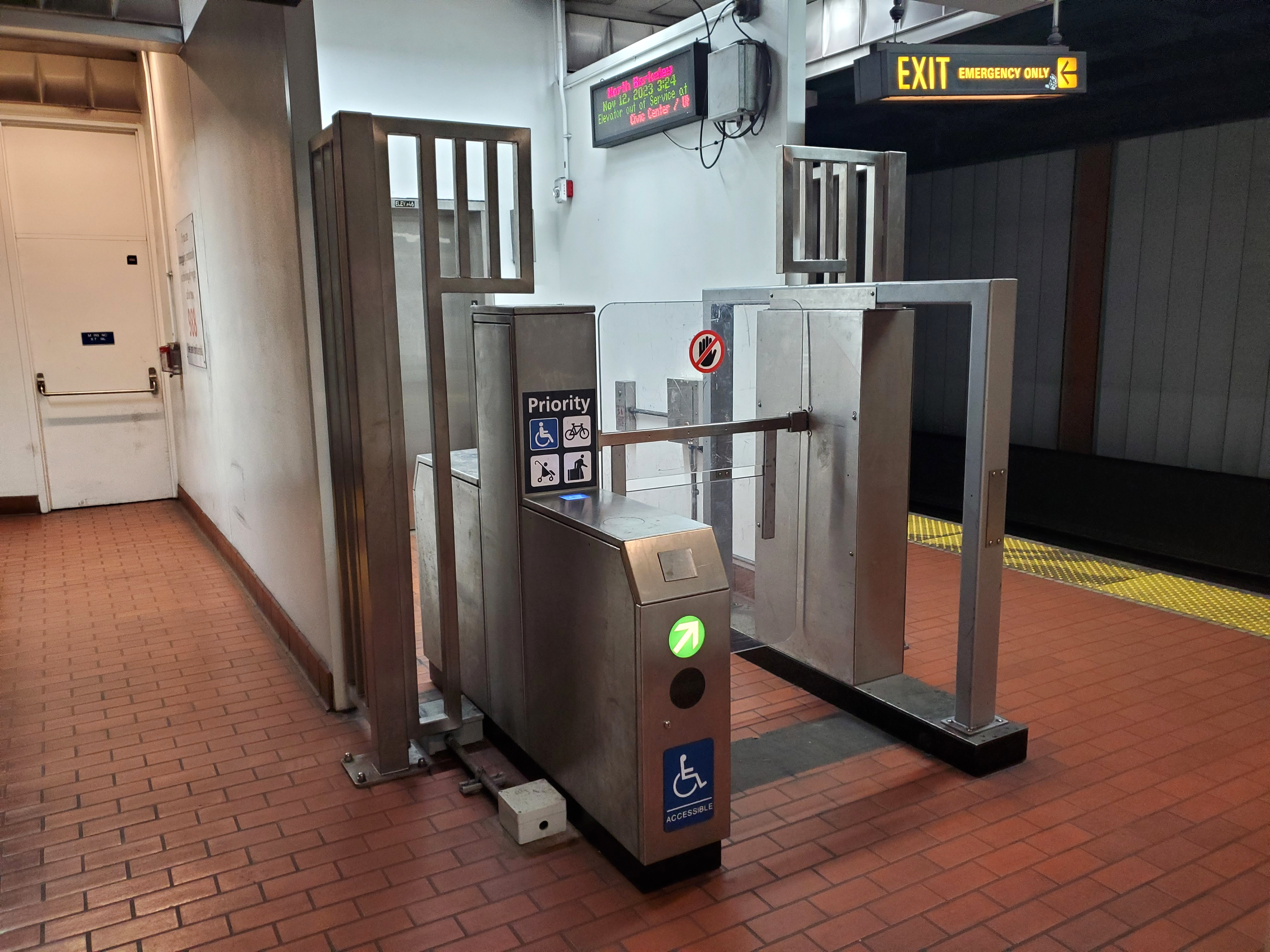
The 2022-installed elevator faregate

The site was originally an open area across which the Key System constructed its Westbrae streetcar line, subsequently given the letter designation "G". The tracks ran diagonally across the property in virtually the same alignment as today's underground BART tracks. Homes began to be constructed along the periphery of the site, and after the G-Westbrae line was closed in 1941, filled in most of the rest of it. All of these were demolished in the 1960s to make way for construction of the North Berkeley station. Early proposals included replacing the demolished homes with apartment buildings, but these did not come to fruition. Instead, the area around the station became a parking lot. The BART Board approved the name "North Berkeley" in December 1965. Service at the station began on January 29, 1973.

Pursuant to a law passed by the state of California in 2018, the City of Berkeley and BART plan to replace the surface parking lots with transit-oriented housing. The station site is only partially suited for housing due to the presence of the tracks and station box diagonally underneath. The Berkeley City Council approved a memorandum of understanding with BART in December 2019.

BART selected a development team of three affordable housing nonprofits and a private developer in 2022. Plans call for about 750 housing units, a childcare center, 6,500 square feet (600 m^{2}) of retail space, a bike station, and public space with an extension of the Ohlone Greenway over the station box. While most of the parking spaces would be replaced by the development, up to 120 BART parking spaces would be added in a garage, and 80 spaces in auxiliary lots north of Virginia Street will not be modified. As of May 2024, construction is not expected to begin before mid-2025. The state awarded $25 million in October 2024 for the construction of two plazas plus bike and pedestrian modifications.

Thirteen BART stations, including North Berkeley, did not originally have faregates for passengers using the elevator. In 2020, BART started a project to add faregates to elevators at these stations. The new faregate on the platform at North Berkeley was installed in October 2022.
