= Berkeley Branch Railroad =

Former railway line in California

Overview
- Locale: East Bay
- Dates of operation: 1876–1888
- Successor: Southern Pacific Railroad

Technical
- Track gauge: 4 ft 8 1/2 in (1,435 mm) standard gauge

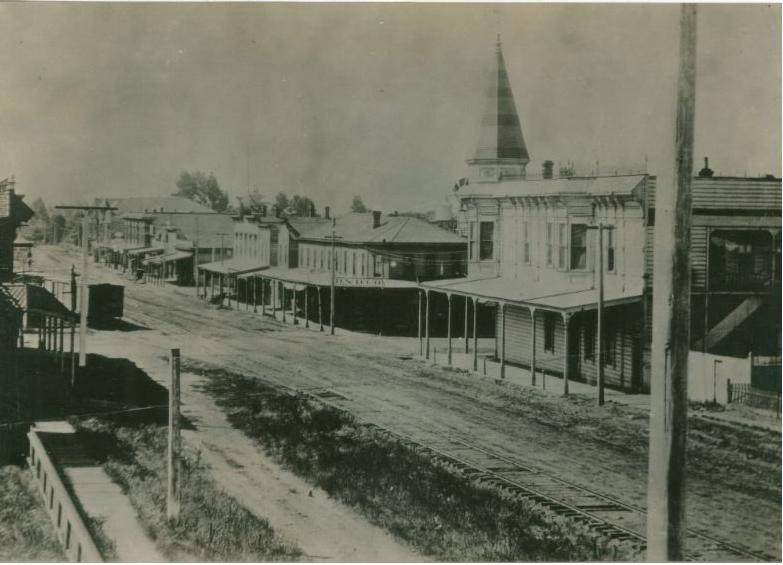
Shattuck Avenue in Berkeley, c. 1893. Tracks run down the unpaved street with a boxcar left of frame.

The Berkeley Branch Railroad was a 3.84-mile (6.18 km) long branch line of the Central Pacific Railroad (CPRR) from a junction in what later became Emeryville called "Shellmound" to what soon became downtown Berkeley, adjacent to the new University of California campus.

== History ==
The line opened on August 16, 1876. The initial terminal point was at Shattuck and University Avenues in Berkeley (designated "Berkeley Terminus"). In 1878, the line was extended north along Shattuck to Vine ("Berryman's Station") with the original terminus then becoming Berkeley Station. The line connected at Shellmound with trains headed to the Oakland Pier and ferries to San Francisco. Beginning on January 22, 1882, Berkeley Branch trains proceeded directly to the pier.

The line was constructed in no small part because of heavy lobbying by prominent local citizens like Francis K. Shattuck and people connected with the University of California.

The Berkeley Branch Railroad was used under lease by the Central Pacific until 1885, when it was leased by the CPRR's affiliate, the Southern Pacific Railroad (SP). In 1888, the SP consolidated the Berkeley Branch Railroad into its subsidiary, the Northern Railway.

Although the corporate Berkeley Branch ceased to exist at that time, its trackage continued to be called the "Berkeley branch line". In 1911, the line was electrified for commuter service, becoming a part of the SP's East Bay Electric Lines. When SP ceased running its electric commuter trains in July 1941, the trackage up to Ward Street and Shattuck Avenue remained in use for freight and was referred to as the "Berkeley Lead". Until the early 1960s, the SP Ward Street Freight Depot was the Berkeley terminal point. Beyond Ward, the tracks were turned over to the Key System for its F Line commuter trains. The Key System had previously used its own tracks which ran parallel to the SP line down Adeline and Shattuck. (The Berkeley Branch tracks had always run along the west side of Shattuck south of University Avenue.) The Key System had ceased operating past Alcatraz Avenue in 1930, and reestablishing F Line service to downtown Berkeley was a term of allowing the railroad to abandon the line.

== Route ==
The Berkeley Branch route began at Shellmound where it was connected to the main line of the CPRR and its successor, the SP. A switching tower existed there, the Shellmound Tower. The tracks then curved onto Stanford Avenue, then Adeline, then Shattuck into downtown Berkeley.

Part of the line corresponds to Bay Area Rapid Transit's route through Berkeley, on Shattuck and Adeline streets but rebuilt as a subway.

== Operations ==
Operations of locomotives on the Berkeley Branch prior to the re-engineering of tracks which accompanied electrification required running "tender-first" in one direction, as the Berkeley Branch was a single-track line having no way to turn the engines at the end of the line.
