= Francis K. Shattuck =

American politician

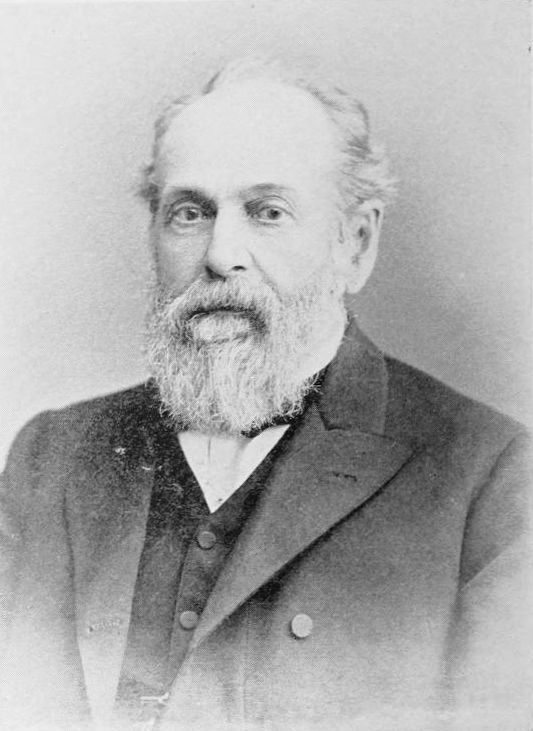

Mayor of Oakland
- In office March 7, 1859 – March 7, 1860

Personal details
- Born: March 6, 1824 Crown Point, New York
- Died: September 9, 1898 (aged 74)
- Resting place: Mountain View Cemetery (Oakland, California)
- Spouse: Rosa Maria Morse
- Parents: Weston Shattuck (father); Betsy Mather (mother)
- Relatives: Millicent K. Blake; Elizabeth Havens; Mary A. Shattuck; Eliza L. Lee

Francis Kittredge Shattuck (March 6, 1824 – September 9, 1898) was the most prominent civic leader in the early history of Berkeley, California, and played an important role in the creation and government of Alameda County as well. He also served as the fifth mayor of the city of Oakland in 1859, and represented the 4th District in the California State Assembly from 1860-61. He also represented Oakland Township for many years on the Board of Supervisors of Alameda County, starting in 1857. He was elected to the board of trustees of the Town of Berkeley in 1884. He was instrumental in founding the First Congregational Church of Oakland.

== Biography ==
Shattuck was born in Crown Point, Essex County in northern New York state. His mother was Betsy Mather, a descendant of Increase Mather who was the president of Harvard from 1685 to 1701. His father Weston Shattuck, a native of Massachusetts, was a farmer who died when Francis was 12. Francis earned a teaching certificate by age 18 and was a schoolteacher for four years. He then moved to a small town in Vermont and worked as a store clerk, until he heard of the discovery of gold in California. He and a friend, George Blake, by then also his brother-in-law, took off for California.

In 1852, Shattuck and Blake, and two partners they met in the gold fields, William Hillegass and James Leonard, claimed four adjoining 160-acre (0.65 km^{2}) strips of land in the area that became the central part of Berkeley. (See Kellersberger's Map)

Shattuck was instrumental in getting the Central Pacific Railroad to construct a branch line into Berkeley in 1876, which connected the community and University of California with the main line and the railroad's ferry to San Francisco.

Shattuck died after he was knocked down by a man exiting from a train that Shattuck was trying to board on Shattuck Avenue. He was buried with his wife Rosa M. Shattuck, his sisters, and their husbands George Blake, Henry H. Havens and Benjamin F. Lee at the Mountain View Cemetery in Oakland.

== Legacy ==
Shattuck had four sisters, Millicent K. Blake, Elizabeth Havens, Mary A. Shattuck, and Eliza L. Lee. Millicent married Shattuck's original partner, George Blake. Shattuck, though married (wife: Rosa Maria Morse, b. 6/12/1834, d. 9/12/1908), died childless. His estate, including several Berkeley properties, went to his wife and to his nephew, John W. Havens, the son of his sister Elizabeth Helen Shattuck Havens.

The principal avenue in the city of Berkeley, Shattuck Avenue, is named for him, as is a smaller street, Kittredge. The Hotel Shattuck Plaza occupies the site of his original home.

Political offices
Preceded by Andrew Williams	Mayor of Oakland, California; 1859—1860	Succeeded by J. P. M. Davis
