= AC Transit Route 72 =

Bus service in California

72

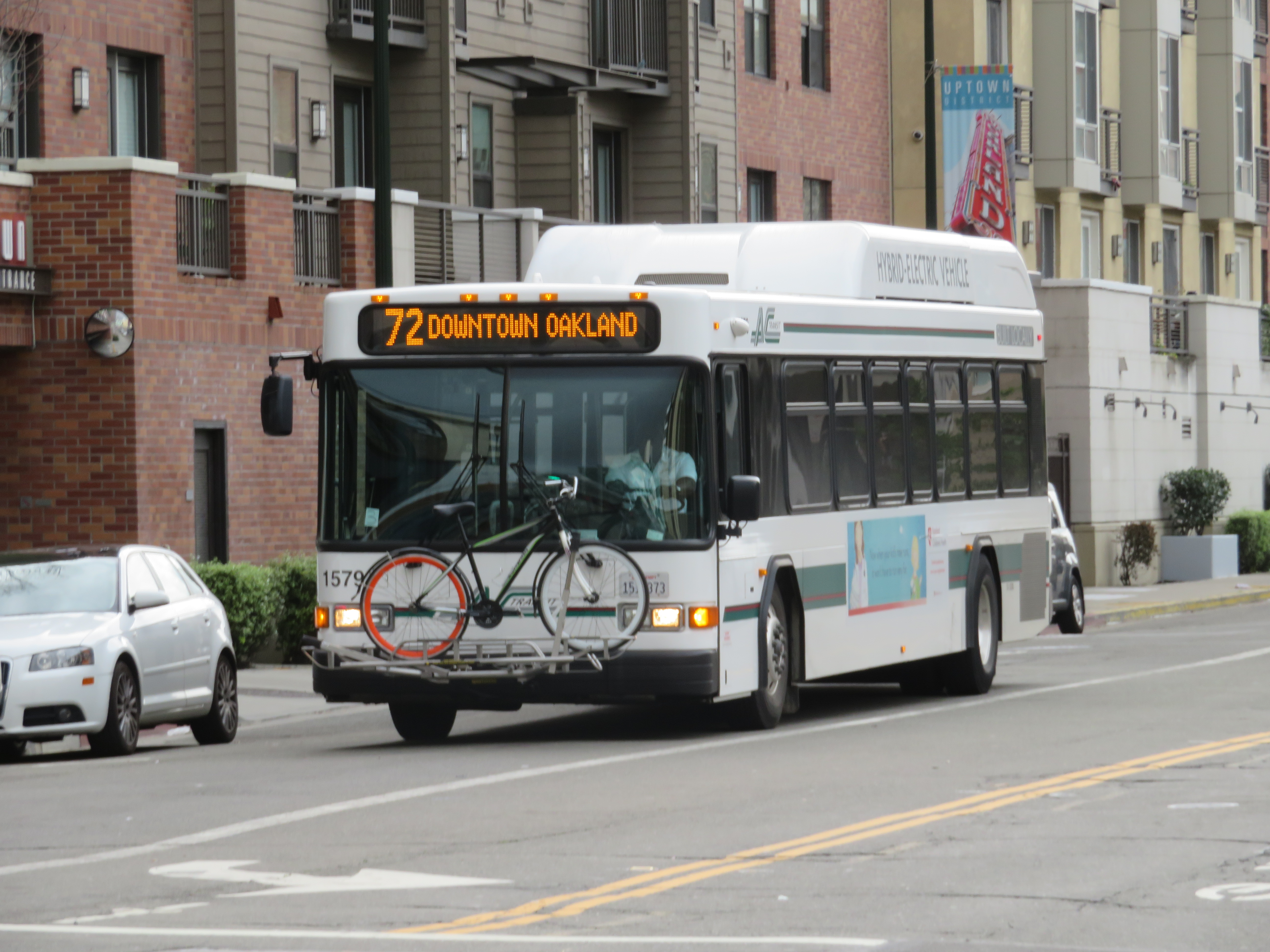

Overview
- Operator: Eastbay Motor Coach Lines (1933–); AC Transit (1960–)
- Began service: 1933

Route
- Locale: Oakland, Emeryville, Berkeley, Albany, El Cerrito, Richmond, El Sobrante, San Pablo
- Via: San Pablo Avenue
- Daily ridership: 2,692 (Fall 2022, 72); 2,583 (Fall 2022, 72M); 3,971 (Fall 2022, 72R)
- Map: 72, 72M, 72L

The 72 is a bus route in the East Bay operated by AC Transit. It serves the San Pablo Avenue corridor between Jack London Square in Oakland and Contra Costa College in San Pablo. The service is descendant from the original streetcar lines that ran along the street.

Transit services along San Pablo Avenue were previously provided by two streetcar systems. The Oakland Traction Company San Pablo Line served the street in Alameda County and the East Shore and Suburban Railway served the street in Contra Costa County with a transfer between the two at the county line. A one-seat ride was established with the introduction of buses along San Pablo Avenue on November 7, 1933. The 72 Line initially terminated at Sixth Street in Richmond and at Tenth Street in Oakland.

By 1973 and the start of Bay Area Rapid Transit services, the 72 ran as several branching lines off San Pablo with letter designations: 72B, 72C, 72M, and 72P.

On June 30, 2003, AC Transit inaugurated its first service with bus rapid transit features along the 72's route. Stops on the 72R are spaced roughly every 2/3 mile (1.1 km), with priority given at signals along the route. On August 10, 2025, as part of AC Transit Realign, the 72R was relabeled to the 72L and the 72 was truncated from Hilltop Mall to Contra Costa College.
