= Waldon, California =

- former Census-designated place (CDP)
- Location in Contra Costa County and the state of California
- Coordinates: 37°55′35″N 122°03′20″W
- Country: United States
- State: California
- County: Contra Costa

Area
  - Total: 0.66 sq mi (1.7 km^{2})
  - Land: 0.66 sq mi (1.7 km^{2})
  - Water: 0 sq mi (0 km^{2})
- Elevation: 92 ft (28 m)

Population (2000)
  - Total: 5,133
  - Density: 7,820/sq mi (3,019.4/km^{2})
- Time zone: UTC-8
- FIPS code: 06-83215
- GNIS feature ID: 1853420

Waldon is a former census-designated place (CDP) in Contra Costa County, California, United States. The population was 5,133 at the 2000 census. It is served by Pleasant Hill/Contra Costa Centre station on the Bay Area Rapid Transit (BART) Yellow Line, and by Interstate 680. The area has been undergoing a series of transit-oriented development projects under the auspices of the Contra Costa Centre Transit Village public/private partnership.

Waldon's territory has been assumed by Contra Costa Centre CDP for the 2010 census.

== Geography ==
According to the United States Census Bureau, the CDP had a total area of 0.7 square miles (1.8 km^{2}), all land. All addresses in Waldon were actually served as Walnut Creek, by the USPS.

== Demographics ==
Historical population
Census	Pop.	Note	%±
2000	5,133		—
U.S. Decennial Census; 1860–1870 1880-1890; 1900 1910 1920; 1930 1940 1950; 1960 1970 1980; 1990 2000 2010

Waldon first appeared as a census designated place in the 2000 U.S. census.

At the 2000 census there were 5,133 people, 3,086 households, and 1,018 families living in the CDP. The population density was 7,755.9 inhabitants per square mile (2,994.6/km^{2}). There were 3,263 housing units at an average density of 4,930.4 per square mile (1,903.6/km^{2}). The racial makeup of the CDP was 75.43% White, 2.05% Black or African American, 0.33% Native American, 15.72% Asian, 0.25% Pacific Islander, 2.24% from other races, and 3.97% from two or more races. 6.18% of the population were Hispanic or Latino of any race. Of the 3,086 households 10.4% had children under the age of 18 living with them, 26.5% were married couples living together, 4.6% had a female householder with no husband present, and 67.0% were non-families. 53.3% of households were one person and 10.5% were one person aged 65 or older. The average household size was 1.66 and the average family size was 2.49.

The age distribution was 9.5% under the age of 18, 8.7% from 18 to 24, 49.8% from 25 to 44, 18.9% from 45 to 64, and 13.1% 65 or older. The median age was 35 years. For every 100 females, there were 94.5 males. For every 100 females age 18 and over, there were 91.9 males.

The median household income was $58,552 and the median family income was $73,869. Males had a median income of $55,000 versus $45,878 for females. The per capita income for the CDP was $41,093. About 3.5% of families and 5.5% of the population were below the poverty line, including 1.3% of those under age 18 and 4.5% of those age 65 or over.
