= East Bay Stadium =

Proposed soccer stadium

- Location: East Bay, California
- Owner: Hall Sports Ventures
- Operator: Hall Sports Ventures
- Capacity: 15,000-18,000
- Surface: Grass

Tenant
- East Bay (USLC) (2021)

East Bay Stadium was the working title name for a planned 15,000-18,000 seat soccer stadium in the San Francisco Bay Area to have housed a proposed East Bay team in the USL Championship.

== Location proposals ==
=== Oakland ===
Site: 37.7537°N 122.2018°W Developer Mark Hall, principal owner of East Bay USL team, offered two proposals for the Oakland–Alameda County Coliseum complex. The first involved acquiring 44 acres (18 ha) and the Oracle Arena for $85 million with the rest of the parcel to be bought by the Oakland Athletics for the construction of their new stadium. The second involved acquiring the entire 135-acre (55 ha) parcel for $135 million should the Athletics decide to relocate. This proposal ended when Athletics purchased the entire site from Alameda County and entered exclusive negotiations to acquire the entirety of the city's portion of the site ownership.

=== Concord ===
Site: 37.9722°N 122.0317°W The Concord site consisted of vacant city land near the Concord BART station and would have also included housing, retail, hotels, and a convention center. The stadium project was canceled in May 2020. Later, the rights to the proposed East Bay team were sold to the ownership group of the Oakland Roots who used them to promote the Roots to USL Championship.
