= Walnut Creek station =

Rapid transit station in Walnut Creek, California, US

Walnut Creek
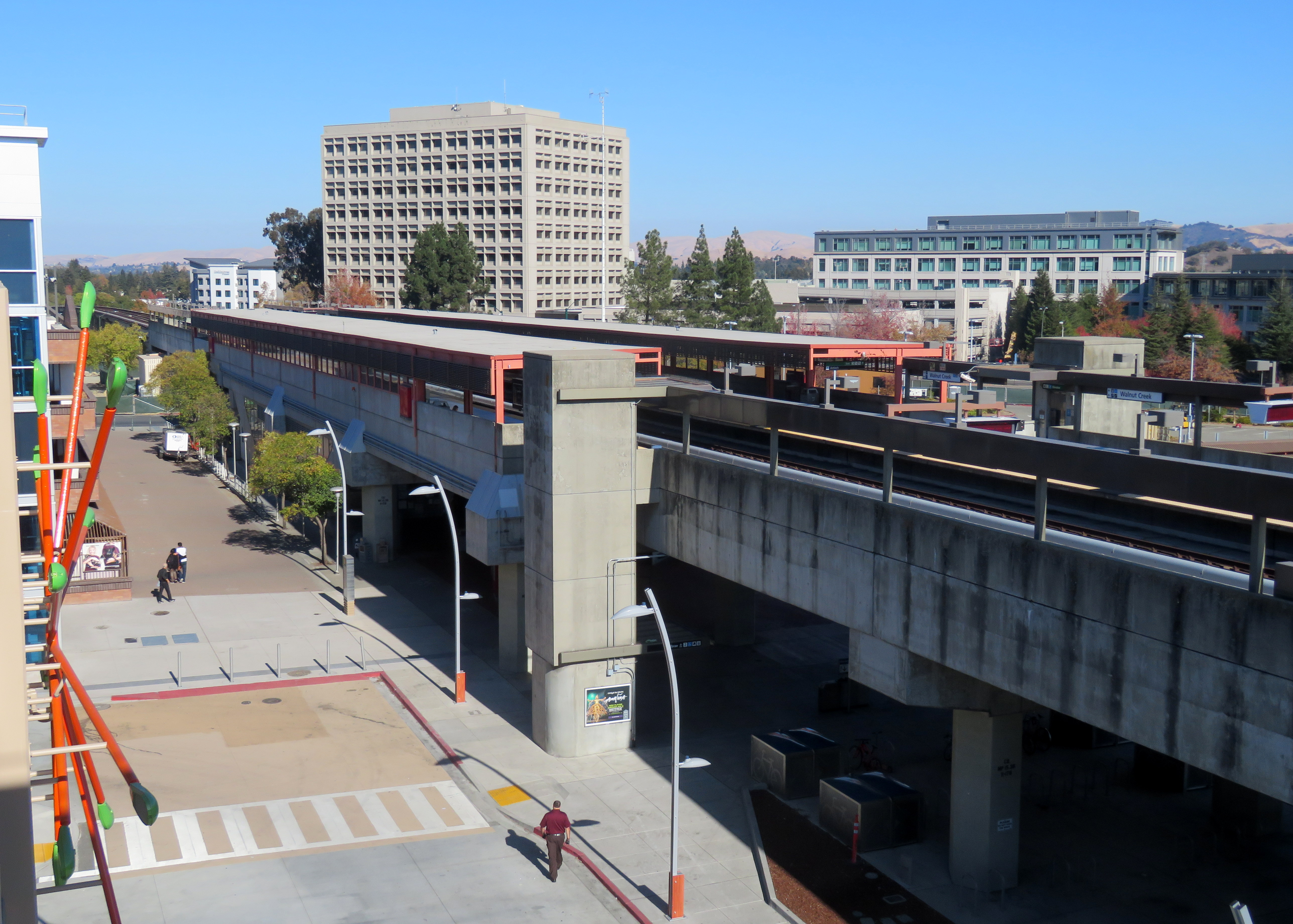
- Walnut Creek station in November 2019

General information
- Location: 200 Ygnacio Valley Road; Walnut Creek, California
- Coordinates: 37.905724°N 122.067332°W
- Owner: San Francisco Bay Area Rapid Transit District
- Line: BART C-Line
- Platforms: 2 side platforms
- Tracks: 2
- Connections: County Connection: 1, 4, 5, 9, 14, 21, 93X, 95X, 96X, 98X, 301, 311, 321, 601, 602; SolTrans: Blue, Yellow; WHEELS: 70X

Construction
- Structure type: Elevated
- Parking: 2,089 spaces
- Cycle facilities: 64 lockers
- Accessible: Yes
- Architect: Gwathmey, Sellier & Crosby; Joseph Esherick & Associates

Other information
- Station code: BART: WCRK

History
- Opened: May 21, 1973

Passengers
- 2025: 3,078 (weekday average)

Services
Preceding station	Bay Area Rapid Transit	Following station
Lafayette toward SFO or Millbrae	Yellow Line	Pleasant Hill/Contra Costa Centre toward Antioch via Pittsburg/Bay Point
Location

Walnut Creek station is an elevated Bay Area Rapid Transit (BART) station in Walnut Creek, California. It is served by the Yellow Line. The station is located north of downtown Walnut Creek, near Interstate 680, Ygnacio Valley Road, and North California Boulevard. The station opened on May 21, 1973, as part of an extension from MacArthur to Concord. It was built as a suburban park-and-ride stop but became a major transfer point and focus of transit-oriented development in central Contra Costa County. Its parking lots have been partly replaced by the Walnut Creek Transit Village, a phased mixed-use development.

== Station layout ==
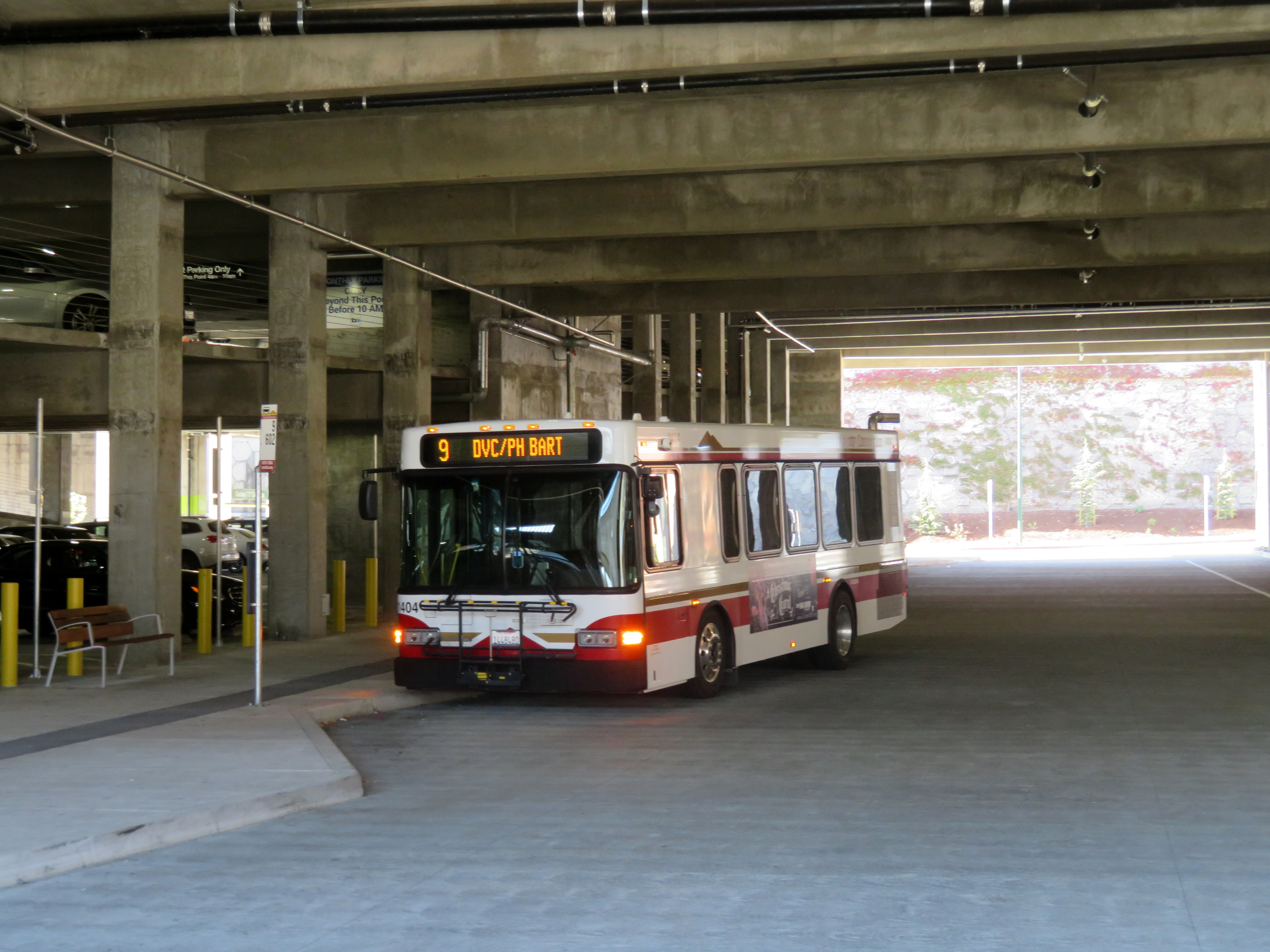
A County Connection bus at the station

The elevated BART tracks run approximately northeast–southwest through the station area. Two parking garages and a residential building are on the west side of the station; former parking lots planned for development are on the east side. Walnut Creek station has two side platforms serving the two tracks. The unpaid fare lobby is located under the center of the platforms. The paid lobby is to the north, with escalators and stairs to the platforms. Elevators to the platforms and bike storage are to the south.

Walnut Creek is a transfer point for a number of County Connection local and express routes:

- Weekday: 1, 4, 5, 9, 14, 21, 93X, 95X, 96X, 98X
- Weekend: 4, 301, 311, 321

The station is also served by several regional routes: the SolTrans Solano Express Yellow Line and Blue Line, and WHEELS route 70X. All buses stop in the busway inside the south garage.

== History ==
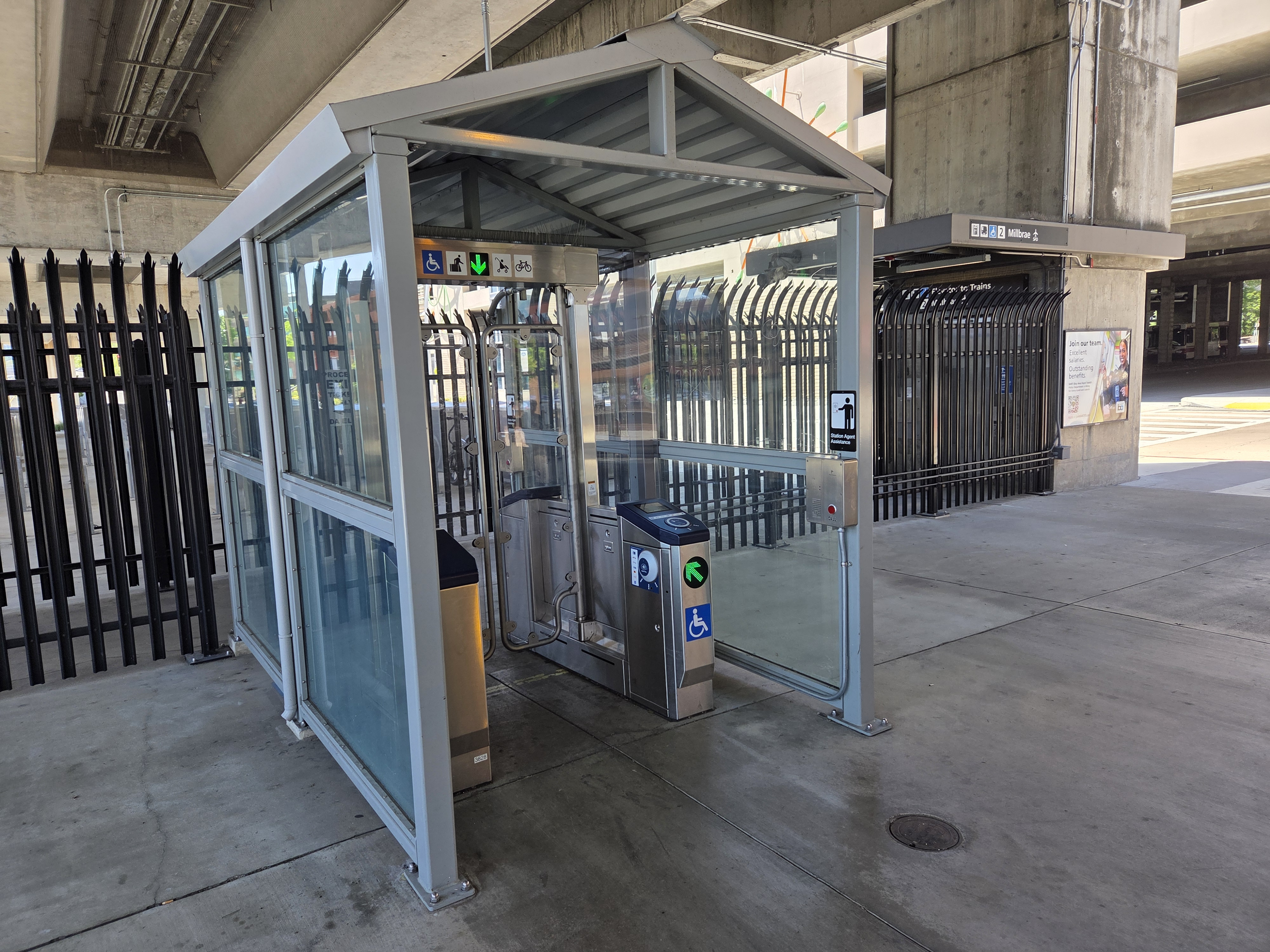
The 2022-installed elevator faregate

The BART Board approved the name "Walnut Creek" in December 1965. Walnut Creek station opened on May 21, 1973 as part of an extension from MacArthur to Concord. The station was designed by Gwathmey, Sellier & Crosby and Joseph Esherick & Associates. The city of Walnut Creek began operating a shuttle service between the station and the downtown area on December 12, 1974. It was taken over by the Central Contra Costa Transit Authority (County Connection) on July 1, 1980.

BART released a plan in 2004 that called for changes to the station and surrounding area. To accommodate increased ridership, a new south paid lobby was to be added, with new escalators and stairs to the platforms. The existing paid area would be enlarged with new elevators added, and the platforms would be widened. Seismic retrofitting of the parking garage took place in 2009–2010. BART released conceptual modernization plans, which largely followed the recommendations of the 2004 plan, in May 2019.

Thirteen BART stations, including Walnut Creek, did not originally have faregates for passengers using elevators. In 2020, BART started a project to add faregates to elevators at these stations. The new faregate at Walnut Creek was installed in September 2022.

=== Development ===
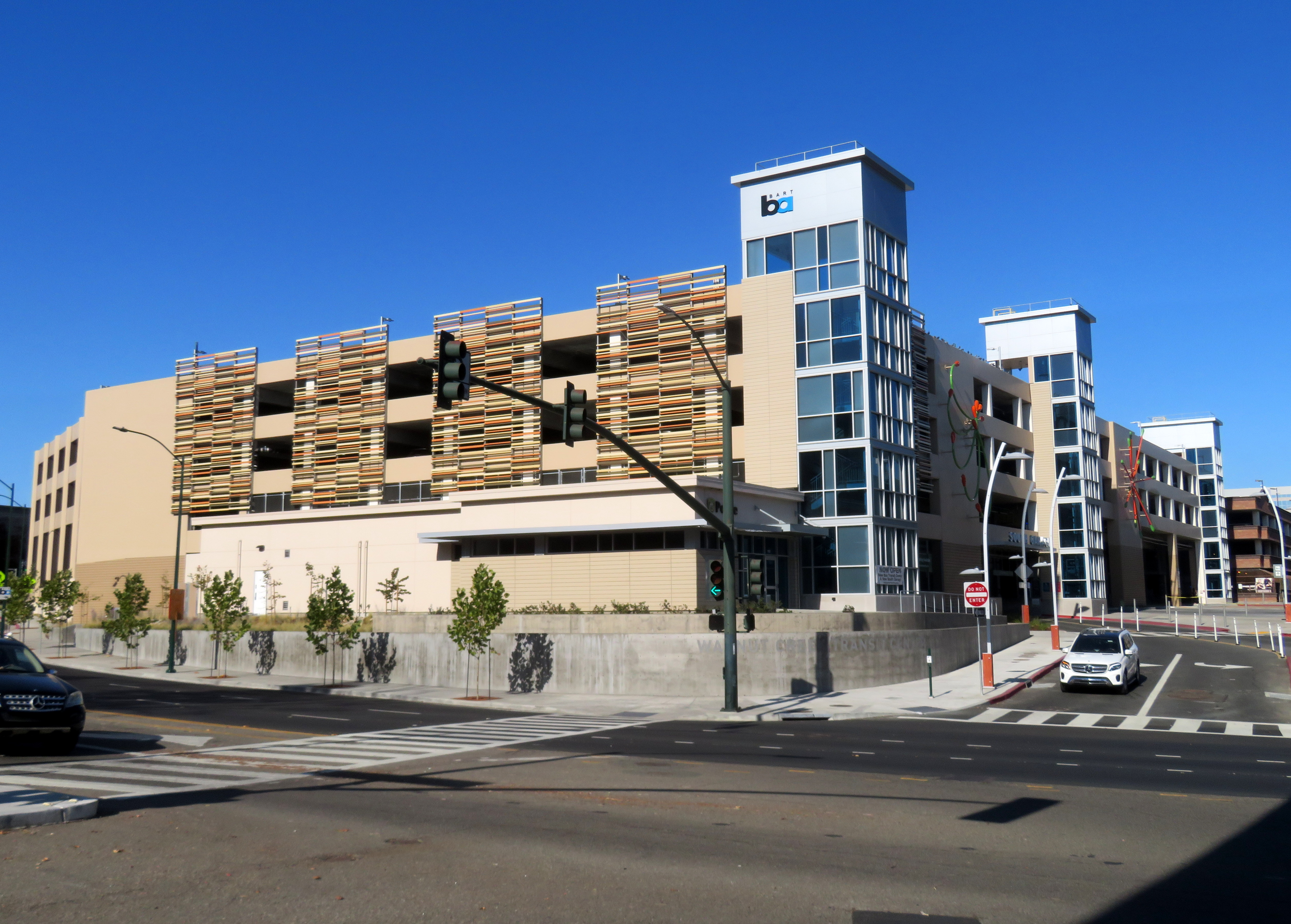
The completed south garage in 2019

Walnut Creek station was originally intended to serve the surrounding low-density suburban neighborhoods. The opening of the station prompted commercial and office developments in Walnut Creek, culminating in 1985 with the ten-story buildings of the "Golden Triangle" near the station. In March 1985, city voters passed a height restriction law to reduce the amount of development.

In 2000, BART began negotiations with a developer that sought to build a transit-oriented apartment complex on the station parking lots. The 2004 station plan proposed development of the parking lots with 440 residential units, 8,700 sq ft (810 m^{2}) of office space, 33,000 sq ft (3,100 m^{2}) of retail space, and 1,373 parking spaces. The developer first submitted plans to the city in 2005; the project was indefinitely delayed in 2009 due to the Great Recession. The plans were ultimately approved by the city in October 2012, with the parking garage to be the first portion built.

A parking lot on the west side of the station closed on February 3, 2018. The 900-space south parking garage was constructed in its place, which allowed other parking lots to be closed for the new development. The new garage, which includes a three-lane bus plaza, opened on March 29, 2019. The north and east parking lots closed at that time.

Construction of a 358-unit apartment building on the north lot took place from 2019 to 2023; development of the east lots is planned. The vehicle and pedestrian entrance from North California Boulevard was relocated to the north on November 10, 2022. When complete, the Walnut Creek Transit Village is planned to include the garage and bus terminal, about 596 housing units, 27,000 sq ft (2,500 m^{2}) of retail space, and a BART police facility.
