= SolTrans =

Transportation service in Solano County, California

Solano County Transit
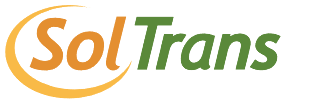

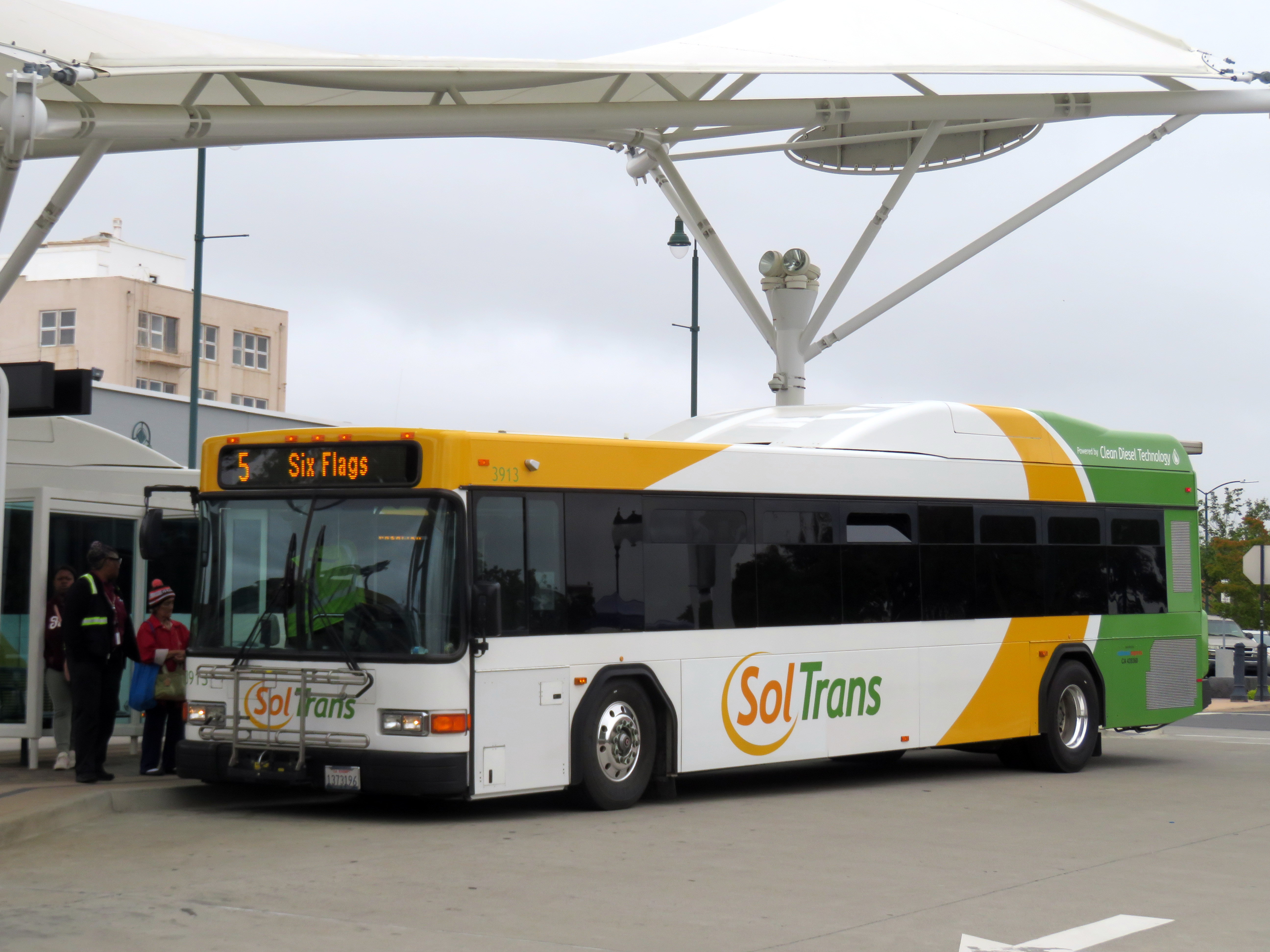
- SolTrans Route 5 at Vallejo Transit Center
- Founded: November 16, 2010
- Headquarters: Vallejo Station
- Locale: Vallejo, California; Benicia, California
- Service area: Solano County, California; Contra Costa County, California
- Service type: Bus service Paratransit
- Routes: 16
- Hubs: 1
- Stations: 3
- Daily ridership: 3,800 (weekdays, Q3 2025)
- Annual ridership: 2,031,200 (2024)
- Operator: Transdev
- Website: soltrans.org

SolTrans, officially Solano County Transit, is a joint powers authority that provides public transportation service to the southern Solano County cities of Vallejo and Benicia, California, United States. SolTrans was established in 2011 and is the result of a merger between Vallejo Transit and Benicia Breeze. In 2024, the system had a ridership of 2,031,200, or about 3,800 per weekday as of the third quarter of 2025.

== History ==
The origins of SolTrans go back to the early 20th century, when two independent bus companies served southern Solano County. These companies were eventually acquired by the cities of either of Vallejo or Benicia, before consolidating to become Solano County Transit.

=== Vallejo Transit ===
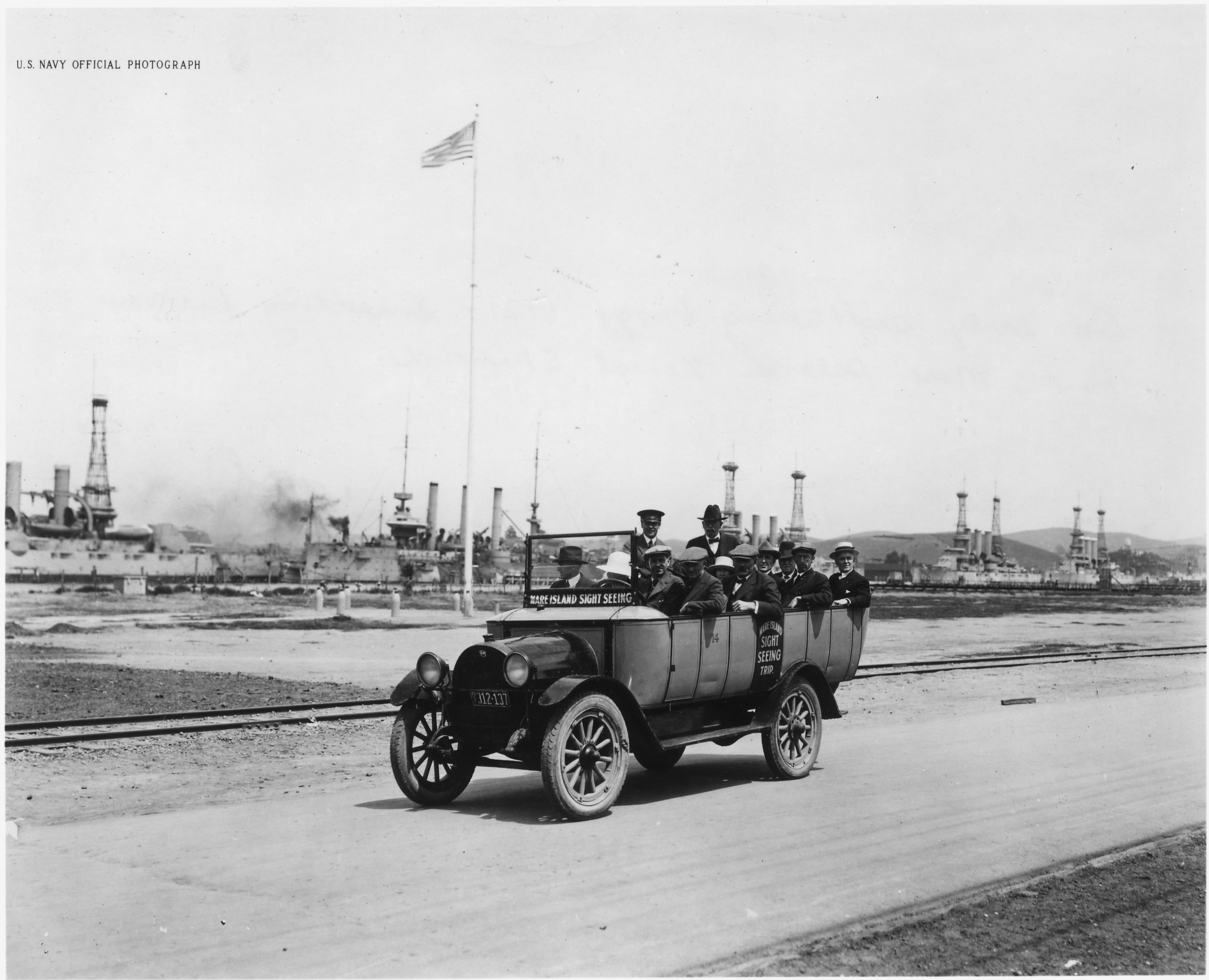
Vallejo Bus Company in the 1920s

The Vallejo Bus Company was founded by Hartley Lowell in 1919. In 1935, the company changed hands among a number of owners until 1949, when the City of Vallejo took control of it. However, the Vallejo City Council opted to close it in 1956 due to financial constraints. In response, community leaders led by Senator Luther Gibson created the Vallejo Citizens Transit Corporation (VCTC) in hopes of continuing services in Vallejo. The city subsequently transferred the fleet of 13 buses to VCTC, who branded it Vallejo Transit Lines on May 1.

=== Benicia Breeze ===
The Benicia-Vallejo Stage Line was founded in 1915 by Milo Passalacqua. It offered a route between Mare Island and Benicia, serving Vallejo's train stations and ferry docks. In 1982, the City of Benicia began operating Benicia Dial-a-Ride, a local demand responsive transit service. Service was expanded on July 1, 1986, to include a fixed route between Benicia and the Pleasant Hill BART station; this service was called the Benicia Bay Connection. The city also began subsidizing the Benicia-Vallejo Stage Line. On October 1, 1986, the Bay Connection and Stage Line were merged to become Benicia Transit. This new company was managed by Community Transit Services, which was eventually acquired by Laidlaw. In the 1990s, Benicia Transit added a number of additional routes, such as the Southampton Express (1991–2001) and as a few school tripper routes. It also purchase five used Gillig Phantoms for their main route and begin serving the Martinez Amtrak station between 1994 and 1997, before dedicating a route to it in 2005.

MV Transportation was awarded a contract to operate Benicia Transit in 2000, who would acquire controlling interest in VCTC five years later, transforming it into an MV subsidiary. In 2001, the Benicia Flyer route serving the Southampton hills operated for one year, before being discontinued due to low ridership and replaced with the Benicia Rocket, a route serving the Benicia Industrial Park. By October 2005, all named routes were converted into numbers, with the main Vallejo/Pleasant Hill eventually being Route 75; the Amtrak being Route 23, and school trippers being Routes 15 through 18.

In 2006, Benicia Transit was re-branded as Benicia Breeze, replacing its dial-a-ride service into deviated fixed routes and reducing its school tripper routes to two. Route 75 was eventually retired in favor of Vallejo Transit Route 78, which extended the route to Walnut Creek.

=== Merger ===
Discussions of merging the two transit agencies have occurred since 2005. However, it was not until 2009 that a merger was seriously considered. In August, the Benicia city council reluctantly agreed with representatives of the Solano Transit Authority (STA) to study the possibility of creating a new transit agency with Vallejo Transit, citing the declining ridership and revenue caused by the Great Recession. On November 16, 2010, both cities agreed to enter into a joint powers authority agreement with the STA, calling the new transit agency Solano County Transit (or SolTrans). The name was selected out of 15 others, as it opened the possibility of other transit agencies in the county to join the agreement.

In 2013, National Express Transit replaced MV as its operations contractor, followed by Transdev in July 2021.

== Services ==
SolTrans provides local and express bus service to the Solano County cities of Vallejo, Benicia, and Fairfield. It also provides express bus service to the Contra Costa County communities of El Cerrito, Pleasant Hill, and Walnut Creek, providing regional connections to BART. SolTrans also provides ADA complementary paratransit within Vallejo and Benicia and general public Dial a Ride within Benicia.

Ferry service from Vallejo to San Francisco, which was operated by Vallejo Transit, is now provided by San Francisco Bay Ferry, the public operating arm of the San Francisco Bay Area Water Emergency Transportation Authority (WETA).

=== SolanoExpress ===
SolanoExpress is a public transit network of regional express buses connecting Solano County, California to Contra Costa County (across the Carquinez Strait) and the Sacramento Valley. It is managed by the Solano Transportation Authority and operated by SolTrans. The Solano Transportation Authority is a joint powers authority established in 1990 by Solano County and the cities of Benicia, Dixon, Fairfield, Rio Vista, Suisun City, Vacaville, and Vallejo to serve as the congestion management agency for Solano County, as mandated by California law.

== Transit stations ==
SolTrans operates three transportation hubs in Vallejo.

=== Vallejo Transit Center ===
The Vallejo Transit Center serves as the headquarters and central transfer point for SolTrans. The City of Vallejo contracted with STV Incorporated to build the center. It has 12 bays for buses. It opened in 2011.

=== Curtola Park & Ride ===
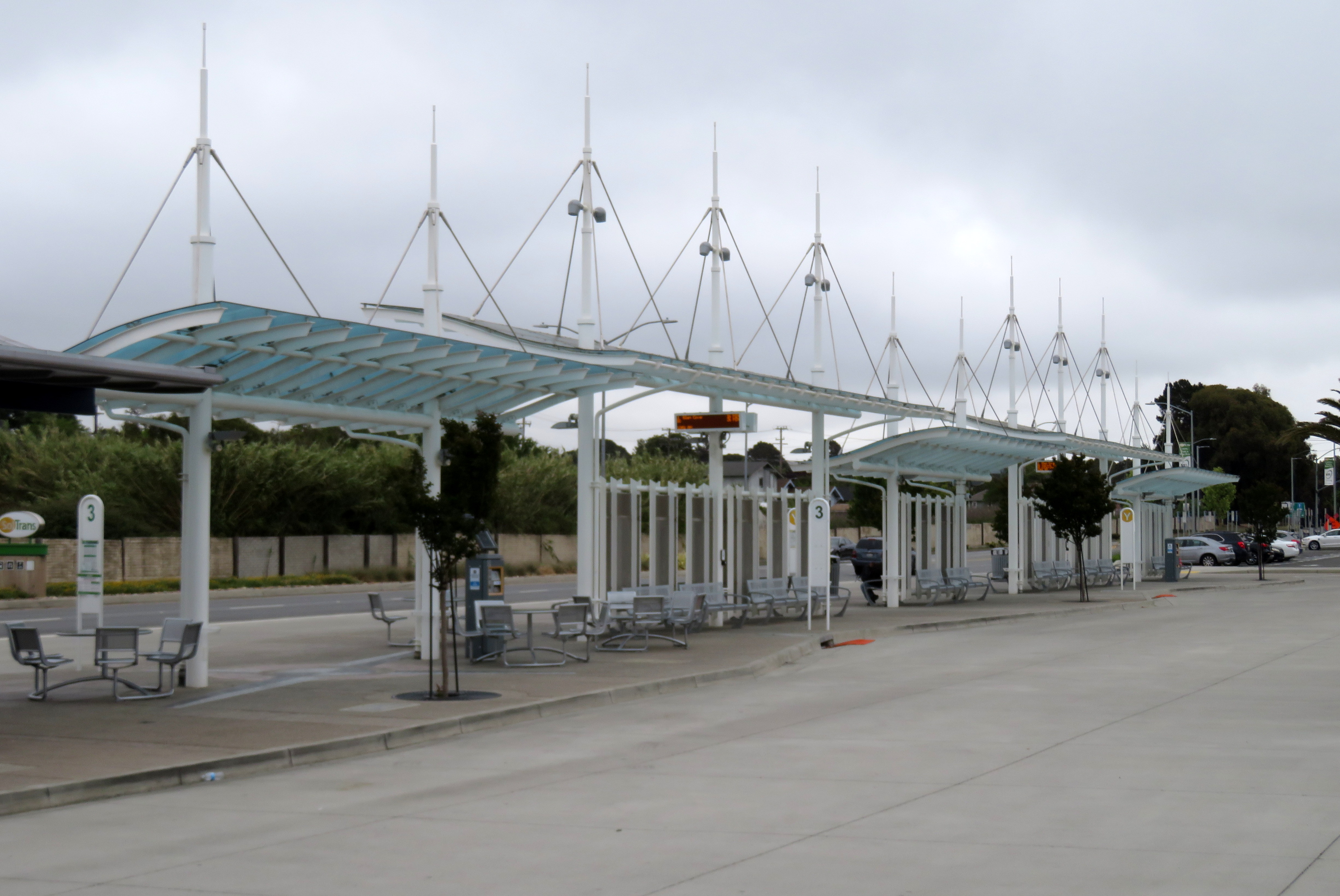
Curtola Park & Ride in May 2019

The Curtola Park & Ride, also known as Curtola, is a bus station in South Vallejo, California, United States. The facility serves as a bus hub for transportation on local, commuter, and long-distance bus services. It has 419 parking spaces.

In 2015 the bus station was upgraded for around $US10 million.

The station is served by SolTrans buses including local route 3 to the Glen Cove District. Line 78 provides intercity service to the Walnut Creek BART station, while route 80 connects it to the El Cerrito del Norte BART station.

There is a casual carpool and vanpool area here. There is also an operations and maintenance facility for SolTrans here.

=== Sereno Transit Center ===
The Sereno Transit Station is a bus station in North Vallejo.

== Routes ==
As of July 1, 2019, SolTrans operates 16 bus routes: nine local routes and three supplemental school routes operate within the Vallejo/Benicia area, and three routes provide intercity service.

Route	Destination	Service notes
1	Broadway	Daily service provided
2	Northeast	Monday through Saturday
3	South Vallejo	Monday through Saturday
4	Tuolumne	Monday through Saturday
5	Fairgrounds	Monday through Saturday
6	Tennessee	Monday through Saturday
7A clockwise / 7B counterclockwise		Daily service provided
8	Glen Cove	Monday through Saturday
15	Benicia Schools – Rose Dr	School days only
17	Benicia Schools – Hastings	School days only
38	Glen Cove – Jesse Bethel	School days only
R	Red Line: I-80 Express	Daily service provided
82	San Francisco Express	Limited weekday service
Y	Yellow Line: I-680 Express	Daily service provided

== Fleet and livery ==
SolTrans operates a mixed fleet of buses. When SolTrans was fully integrated in 2011, it introduced Gillig Low Floor hybrid buses for local bus service, while the intercity routes continue to use MCI D4500 buses. SolTrans continues to use a small number of Orion V buses previously used by Vallejo Transit. SolTrans also makes use of small cutaway buses from Starcraft Bus and ElDorado National for Paratransit and Dial-a-ride services. All buses are bicycle and wheelchair accessible.

In 2017, SolTrans introduced two new bus styles and accompanying updated paint scheme: an updated D4500 fueled by compressed natural gas (CNG); and the BYD K9M full-electric low-floor transit bus.
