= County Connection =

Public transit agency in Contra Costa County, California

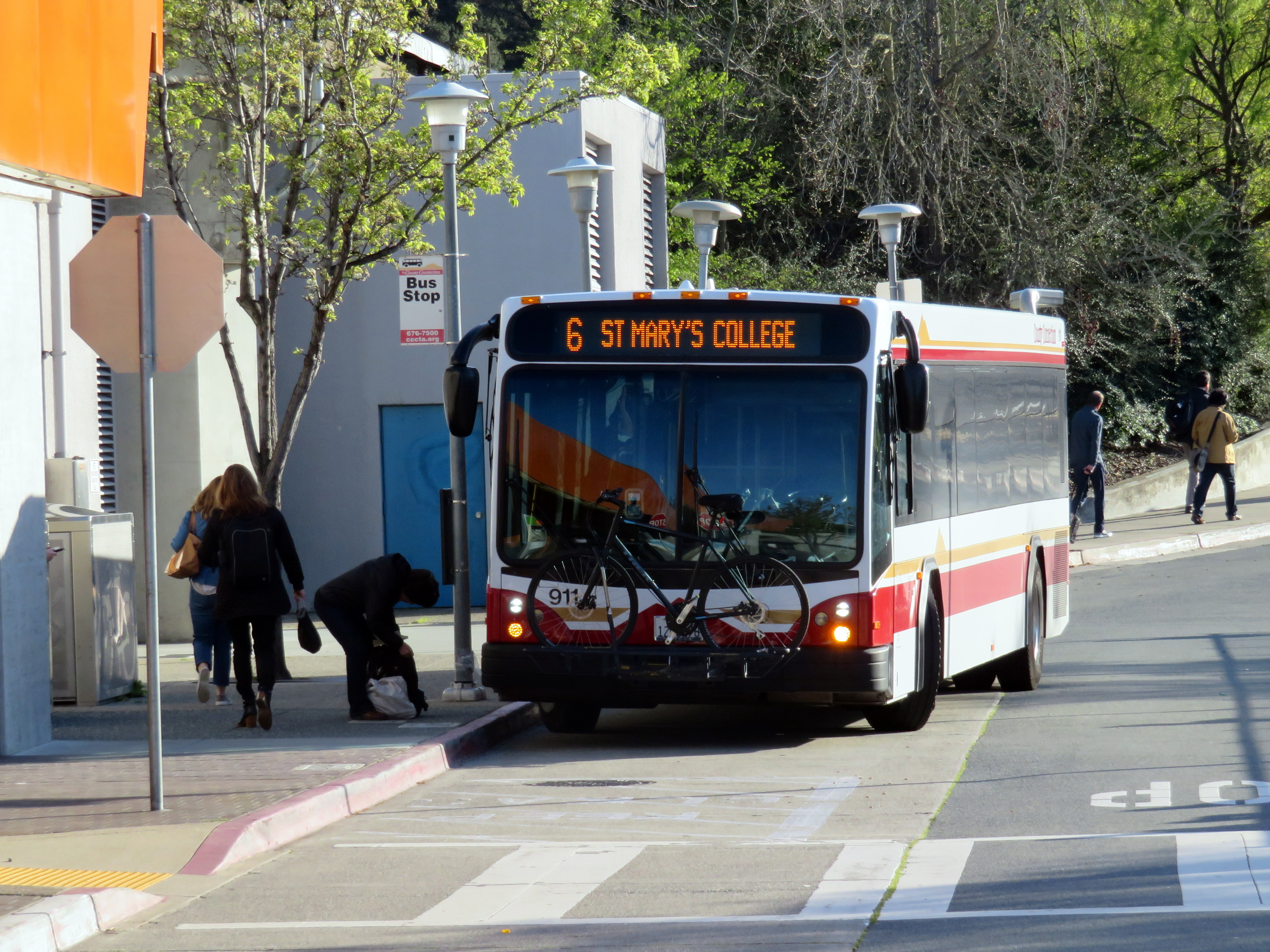
- County Connection bus at Orinda station in 2018
- Parent: Central Contra Costa Transit Authority
- Founded: 1980
- Headquarters: 2477 Arnold Industrial Way, Concord, California
- Locale: East Bay
- Service area: Central Contra Costa County
- Service type: bus service ADA paratransit
- Routes: 29 local 7 express 25 select service 1 local shuttle
- Stops: 1,000+
- Fleet: 125 heavy-duty transit buses 48 paratransit vans
- Daily ridership: 9,900 (weekdays, Q2 2026)
- Annual ridership: 2,875,400 (2025)
- Fuel type: ULSD
- Chief executive: William Churchill
- Website: cccta.org

The County Connection (officially, the Central Contra Costa Transit Authority, CCCTA) is a Concord-based public transit agency operating fixed-route bus and ADA paratransit (County Connection LINK) service in and around central Contra Costa County in the East Bay region of the San Francisco Bay Area. Contra Costa County has four major public bus transportation services, divided geographically: three mostly serve destinations within the county, covering western (WestCAT), central (County Connection), and eastern (Tri Delta Transit) regions, and one (AC Transit) serves Bayside cities along the western edges of Contra Costa and Alameda counties.

Established in 1980 as a joint powers authority, CCCTA assumed control of public bus service within central Contra Costa first begun by Oakland-based AC Transit as it expanded into suburban Contra Costa County in the mid-1970s (especially after the opening of BART). In 2025, the system had a ridership of 2,875,400, or about 9,900 per weekday as of the second quarter of 2026.

== History ==
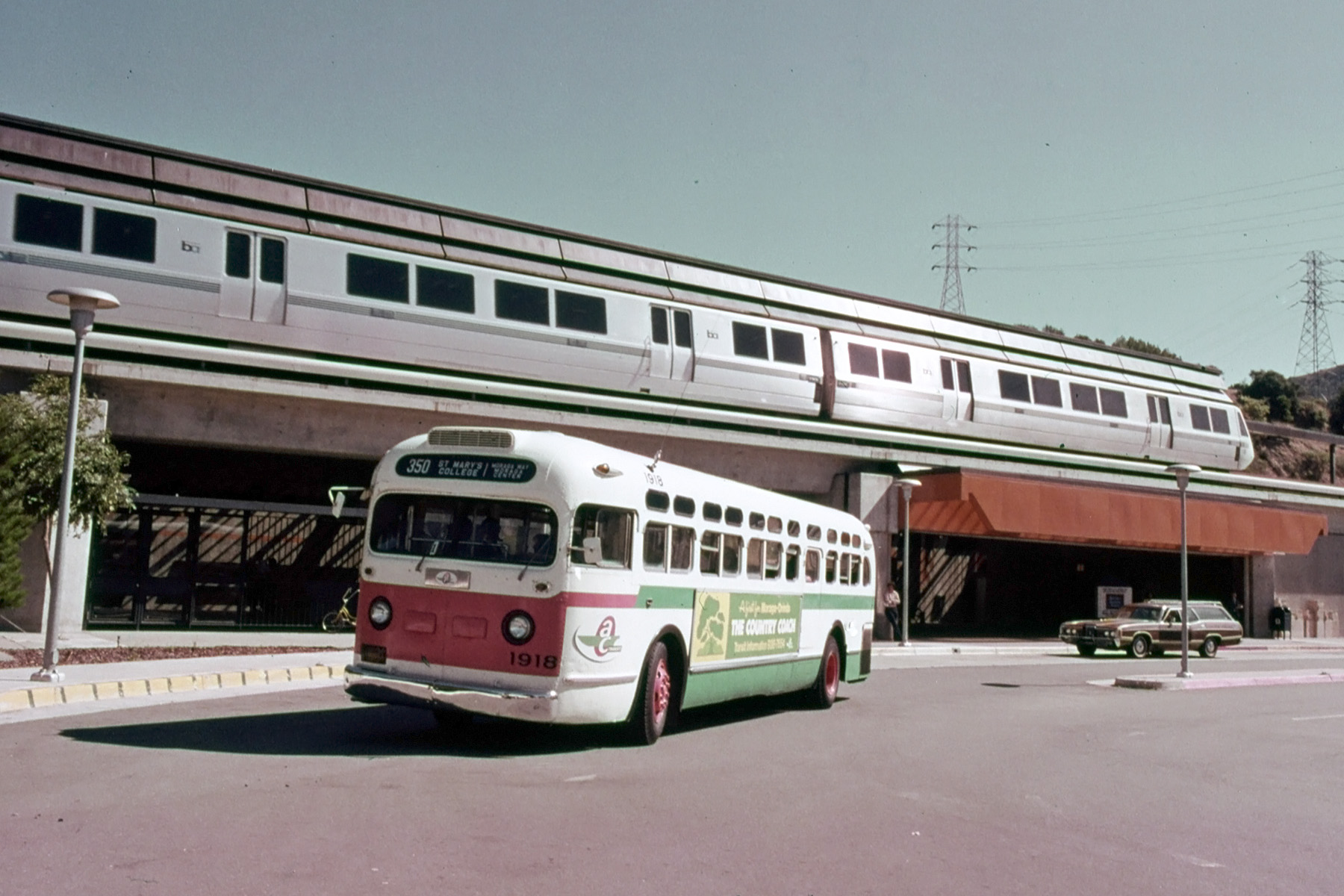
An AC Transit bus at Orinda station prior to the County Connection takeover

AC Transit began operating local bus service under contract in central Contra Costa County in the 1970s after the coming of BART. Service began in Concord on September 8, 1975; in Pleasant Hill on December 8, 1975; and in Moraga and Orinda on September 13, 1976. Walnut Creek began operating a downtown shuttle route connecting to BART in December 1974.

On March 27, 1980, the Central Contra Costa Transit Authority (CCCTA) was created by a joint powers agreement between the cities of Clayton, Concord, Lafayette, Martinez, Moraga, Pleasant Hill, and Walnut Creek, plus the County of Contra Costa. The agency took over operations of the Walnut Creek system on July 1, 1980; by 1982, it had seven routes and twelve minibuses. The CCCTA originally planned to take over the other services in its district from AC Transit in August 1981. However, slow delivery of the buses and heavy rains that slowed construction of a maintenance facility delayed this until 1982.

A Walnut Creek writer, Elizabeth Tenney, won a contest in early 1982 to create a slogan for the CCRTA system. Her slogan, "The County Connection", was adopted as the system branding. The CCCTA took over local bus service in its district from AC Transit on June 7, 1982, with a fleet of 30 new Gillig buses. (AC Transit continued to operate express bus service that functioned as feeder service for BART.) At that time, the Walnut Creek routes had 2,500 daily riders, while the routes taken over from AC Transit had 8,000 daily riders. Several routes were consolidated with the takeover, while a new Martinez–Concord–Clayton route was added.

County Connection took over the operations of three private paratransit providers in 1990 to form its paratransit service, branded as LINK. In 1994, the agency took over the BART express bus feeder service.

== Fares ==
Current standard single-ride fares are $2.50 with cash and $2.00 with a Clipper card. Fares are automatically capped at $3.75 a day with Clipper, however, a monthly pass can be purchased for $60. Clipper START users, youth (0-18), senior (65+), and disabled fares are half-off when paid with Clipper. Reduced fares when paid with cash are only offered to senior and disabled customers.

Transfer discounts are only offered when using a Clipper card. A single free transfer from bus-to-bus within two hours of initial boarding is given. This free transfer is also valid for a transfer to neighboring systems (SolTrans, Tri Delta Transit, WestCat, Wheels). BART-to-bus transfers give a $1.00 fare discount upon boarding ($0.50 for discounted fare holders). In addition, ACE passengers can ride the 92X for free with a valid ACE ticket. Amtrak passengers can also ride any County Connection bus for free with either a paper ticket for the date printed as well as the following day or with a valid digital transfer.

== Service ==
As of May 2020, the County Connection operates 25 weekday routes (three of which also operate on weekends), seven weekend-only routes, and 19 school tripper routes within central Contra Costa County. All routes, with the exception of some of the 600-numbered series select service trips, connect with regional train service, primarily BART, in addition to ACE in Pleasanton and Amtrak, including Amtrak California's Capitol Corridor and Gold Runner services in Martinez. Among its 30 weekday routes, the County Connection operates seven express routes (Routes 91X—98X). With support from the city of Walnut Creek, the County Connection also operates a free downtown circulator with trolley livery (Route 4) with service between Walnut Creek and Broadway Plaza.

The fleet consists of 121 accessible buses and 63 paratransit vans.

Bus service does not operate on New Year's Day, Memorial Day, Labor Day, Thanksgiving, and Christmas.

=== Route overview ===
==== Weekdays ====
Weekday service is provided on all routes except 300-numbered series routes, which operate only on weekends. 600-numbered series routes are select service trips convenient to area schools and operate on school days, with service timed to school bell times.

Route	Direction	Terminals		ACE, Amtrak, or BART Connection at	Notes/Weekend Route
Route	Direction	North/East Terminal	South/West Terminal	ACE, Amtrak, or BART Connection at	Notes/Weekend Route
1	North-South	Mitchell Dr Park & Ride	Rossmoor	Walnut Creek	Ride 301 on Weekends
4 The Free Ride	North-South	BART Walnut Creek	Broadway Plaza	Walnut Creek	Free, daily service between BART Walnut Creek and Broadway Plaza via downtown
5	North-South	BART Walnut Creek	Creekside Dr	Walnut Creek	
6	East-West	BART Lafayette	BART Orinda	Lafayette, Orinda	Also operates on weekends Operates 3 trips per day to Orinda Village and Community Center
7	East-West	BART Pleasant Hill		Pleasant Hill, Walnut Creek	Operates from 6am – 7pm
9	North-South	Diablo Valley College	BART Walnut Creek	Pleasant Hill, Walnut Creek	Also serves JFK University
10	East-West	Clayton – Clayton Library; 6 AM—8PM; Clayton Rd & Kirker Pass Rd; Before 6 AM and after 8 PM	BART Concord	Concord	Service via Clayton Rd; Ride 310 on Weekends
11	East-West	BART Concord	BART Pleasant Hill	Concord, Pleasant Hill Service via Meadow Ln and Oak Grove Rd (north of Treat Blvd); Ride 311 on Weekends	
14	North-South	BART Concord	BART Walnut Creek	Concord, Pleasant Hill, Walnut Creek	Service via Monument Blvd; Ride 311 and 314 on Weekends
15	East-West	BART Concord	BART Pleasant Hill	Concord, Pleasant Hill	Service via Treat Blvd; Ride 315 on Weekends
16	North-South	Amtrak Martinez; 5:40 AM—8:40 PM; Crescent Plaza & Crescent Dr; After 8:40 PM	BART Concord	Martinez (Amtrak), Concord	Service via Alhambra Ave, Crescent Plaza – Downtown Pleasant Hill, and Monument Blvd; Ride 314 and 316 on Weekends
17	North-South	BART North Concord	BART Concord	North Concord, Concord	
18	North-South	Amtrak Martinez	BART Pleasant Hill	Martinez (Amtrak), Pleasant Hill	Also serves Diablo Valley College; Ride 316 on Weekends
19	North-South	Amtrak Martinez	BART Concord	Martinez (Amtrak), Concord	Ride 316 on Weekends
20	East-West	BART Concord	Diablo Valley College	Concord	Also serves Sunvalley Mall; Ride 314 and 320 on Weekends
21	North-South	BART Walnut Creek	San Ramon Transit Center	Walnut Creek	Service via Danville Blvd; Ride 321 on Weekends
27	East-West	BART North Concord	Mason Circle	Martinez (Amtrak), North Concord	Also serves Diablo Valley College
28	East-West	Amtrak Martinez	BART Concord	Martinez (Amtrak), Concord	Also serves Diablo Valley College
35	North-South	San Ramon Transit Center	BART Dublin/Pleasanton	Dublin/Pleasanton	Service via Windemere Pkwy and East Branch Pkwy only during midday from 10:30 AM to 3:45 PM; Ride 335 on weekends
91X; Concord Commuter Express	Loop	BART Concord – Airport Plaza		Concord	Operates during AM and PM peak periods only
92X; ACE Express	North-South	Mitchell Dr Park & Ride	ACE Pleasanton	Pleasanton (ACE)	Operates during AM and PM peak periods only. Also serves Danville Park & Ride and San Ramon Transit Center
93X; Kirker Pass Express	East-West	BART Walnut Creek; AM terminal	Hillcrest (Antioch) Park & Ride; PM terminal	Walnut Creek	Operates westbound AM only, eastbound PM only (mornings to Walnut Creek, afternoons to Hillcrest Park & Ride)
95X; San Ramon Express	North-South	BART Walnut Creek	San Ramon Transit Center	Walnut Creek	Operates during AM and PM peak periods only. Also serves Danville Park & Ride
96X; Bishop Ranch Express, North	Loop	BART Walnut Creek – Bishop Ranch		Walnut Creek	Operates mainly during AM and PM peak periods only with three midday trips. Also serves San Ramon Transit Center
97X; Bishop Ranch Express, South	Loop	BART Dublin/Pleasanton – Bishop Ranch		Dublin/Pleasanton	Operates during AM and PM peak periods only. Also serves San Ramon Transit Center
98X; Martinez/Walnut Creek Express	North-South	Amtrak Martinez	BART Walnut Creek	Martinez (Amtrak), Walnut Creek	Route also serves Contra Costa Blvd & Viking Dr – Sunvalley Mall
99X; Martinez/North Concord Express	East-West	Amtrak Martinez	BART North Concord	Martinez (Amtrak), North Concord	Route serves Arnold Industrial Wy & Pacheco Transit Hub
Alamo Creek Shuttle	North-South	BART Walnut Creek	Alamo Creek	Walnut Creek	Operates 3 northbound trips and 2 southbound trips AM, 3 southbound trips and 2 northbound trips PM (last morning trip does not return to Alamo Creek, last afternoon trip does not return to BART). Operates using specially wrapped vehicles under County Connection Link
712	East-West	BART Pittsburg/Bay Point	BART 19th Street Oakland	Pleasant Hill	Early Bird Express route with limited early-morning trips
715	East-West	BART North Concord/Martinez	BART Lafayette	Concord, Pleasant Hill, Walnut Creek	Early Bird Express route with limited early-morning trips

==== Weekends ====
Service is provided on the following 11 routes:

Route	Direction	Terminals		ACE, Amtrak, or BART Connection at	Notes
Route	Direction	North/East Terminal	South/West Terminal	ACE, Amtrak, or BART Connection at	Notes
4 The Free Ride	North-South	BART Walnut Creek	Broadway Plaza	Walnut Creek	Free, daily service between BART Walnut Creek and Broadway Plaza via downtown
6	East-West	BART Lafayette	BART Orinda	Lafayette, Orinda	Also operates on weekdays
250; Gael Rail Shuttle	North-South	BART Lafayette	Saint Mary's College	Lafayette	Operates PM trips only Thursday—Sunday
301	North-South	John Muir Medical Center, Walnut Creek Campus	Rossmoor	Walnut Creek	
310	East-West	Clayton Rd & Kirker Pass Road	Concord Bart	Concord	
311	East-West	BART Concord	BART Walnut Creek	Concord, Pleasant Hill, Walnut Creek	
314	East-West	Concord BART	Diablo Valley College	Concord	Service via Contra Costa Blvd, Monument Blvd, and Clayton Rd
315	East-West	Clayton Rd & Bel Air Dr	BART Concord	Concord	
316	North-South	Alhambra Ave & Walnut Ave	BART Pleasant Hill	Martinez (Amtrak), Pleasant Hill	Also serves Diablo Valley College
320	East-West	BART Concord	Diablo Valley College	Concord	Service via Diamond Blvd
321	North-South	BART Walnut Creek	San Ramon Transit Center	Walnut Creek	
335	North-South	San Ramon Transit Center	BART Dublin/Pleasanton	Dublin	
