= Yellow Line (BART) =

Rapid transit line in the San Francisco Bay Area

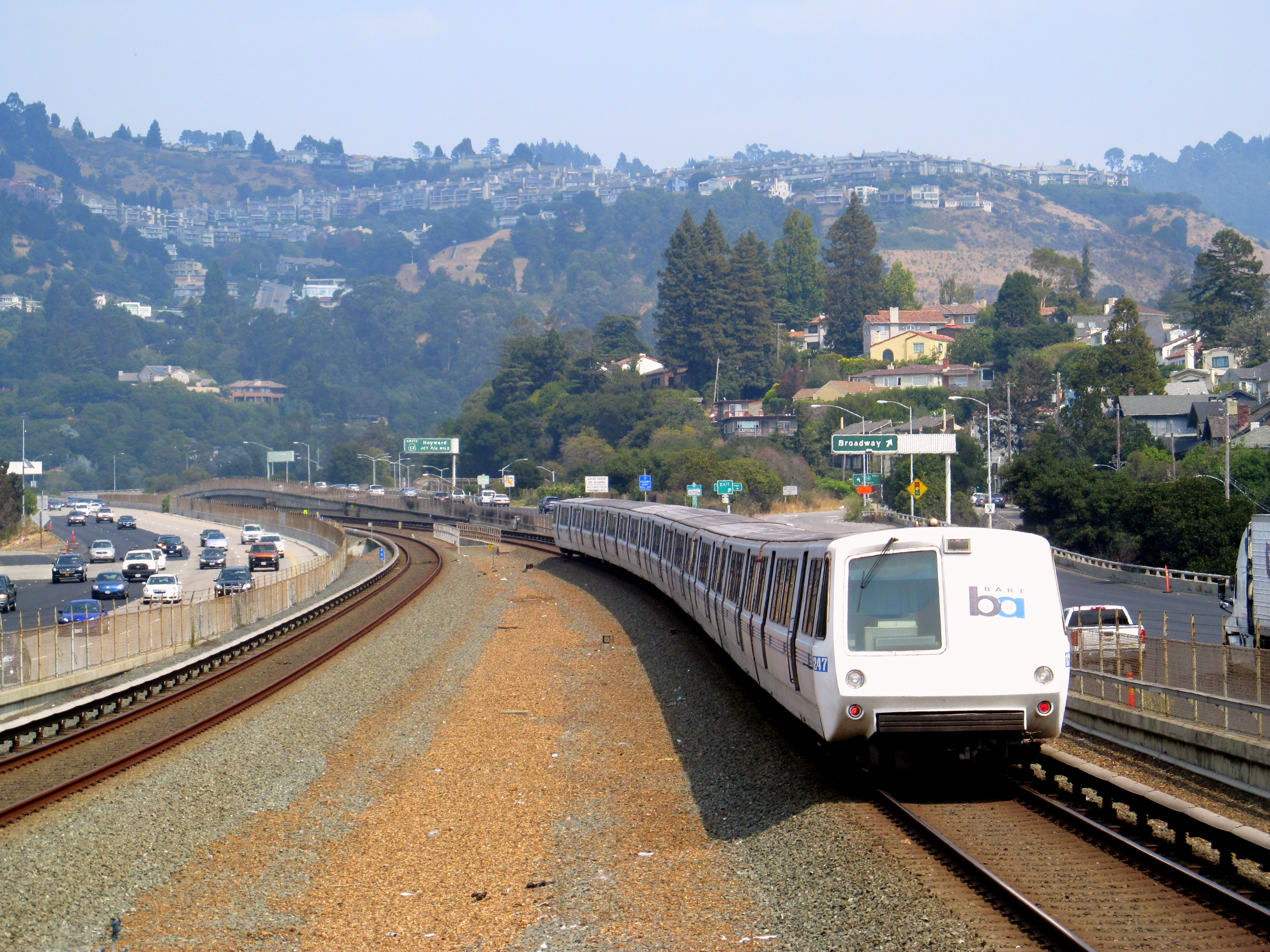
- Eastbound train leaving Rockridge station in September 2017

Overview
- Other name: Antioch – SFO/Millbrae Line
- Owner: San Francisco Bay Area Rapid Transit District
- Locale: California Delta, East Bay, San Francisco Peninsula
- Termini: Antioch; San Francisco International Airport; Millbrae (after 9pm)
- Stations: 28 (including eBART & Millbrae)

Service
- Type: Rapid transit
- System: Bay Area Rapid Transit

History
- Opened: May 21, 1973
- Last extension: May 26, 2018

Technical
- Line length: 53.6 mi (86.3 km) (main segment); 62.2 mi (100.1 km) (includes eBART)
- Track gauge: 5 ft 6 in (1,676 mm); 4 ft 8 1/2 in (1,435 mm) (eBART)
- Electrification: Third rail, 1 kV DC (except eBART)
- Operating speed: 70 mph (110 km/h)
- Signalling: Bombardier CITYFLO 550 fixed block ATC/ATO between San Bruno or Milbrae and SFO
Route map
Yellow Line highlighted in yellow

The Yellow Line is a Bay Area Rapid Transit (BART) line in the San Francisco Bay Area that runs between Antioch and San Francisco International Airport (SFO). Some morning trains and all trains after 9 pm are extended from SFO to serve Millbrae station when the Red Line is not running. It serves 28 stations in Antioch, Pittsburg, Bay Point, Concord, Pleasant Hill, Walnut Creek, Lafayette, Orinda, Oakland, San Francisco, Daly City, Colma, South San Francisco, San Bruno, and Millbrae. It is the most-used BART line, and the only line with additional trains (between SFO and Pittsburg/Bay Point) on weekdays. It runs for 62.2 miles (100.1 km), making it the system's longest line.

The line is split into two segments. The majority of the line uses the same electric multiple unit trains as the rest of BART, and shares tracks with the four other mainline services. The 8.6-mile (13.8 km) section from Antioch to near Pittsburg/Bay Point station, known as eBART, uses diesel multiple units. A cross-platform transfer between the two modes is made at a dedicated transfer platform east of Pittsburg/Bay Point station. However, the line is shown on maps as one route, and headsigns and station information display the ultimate terminus of the line.

== History ==
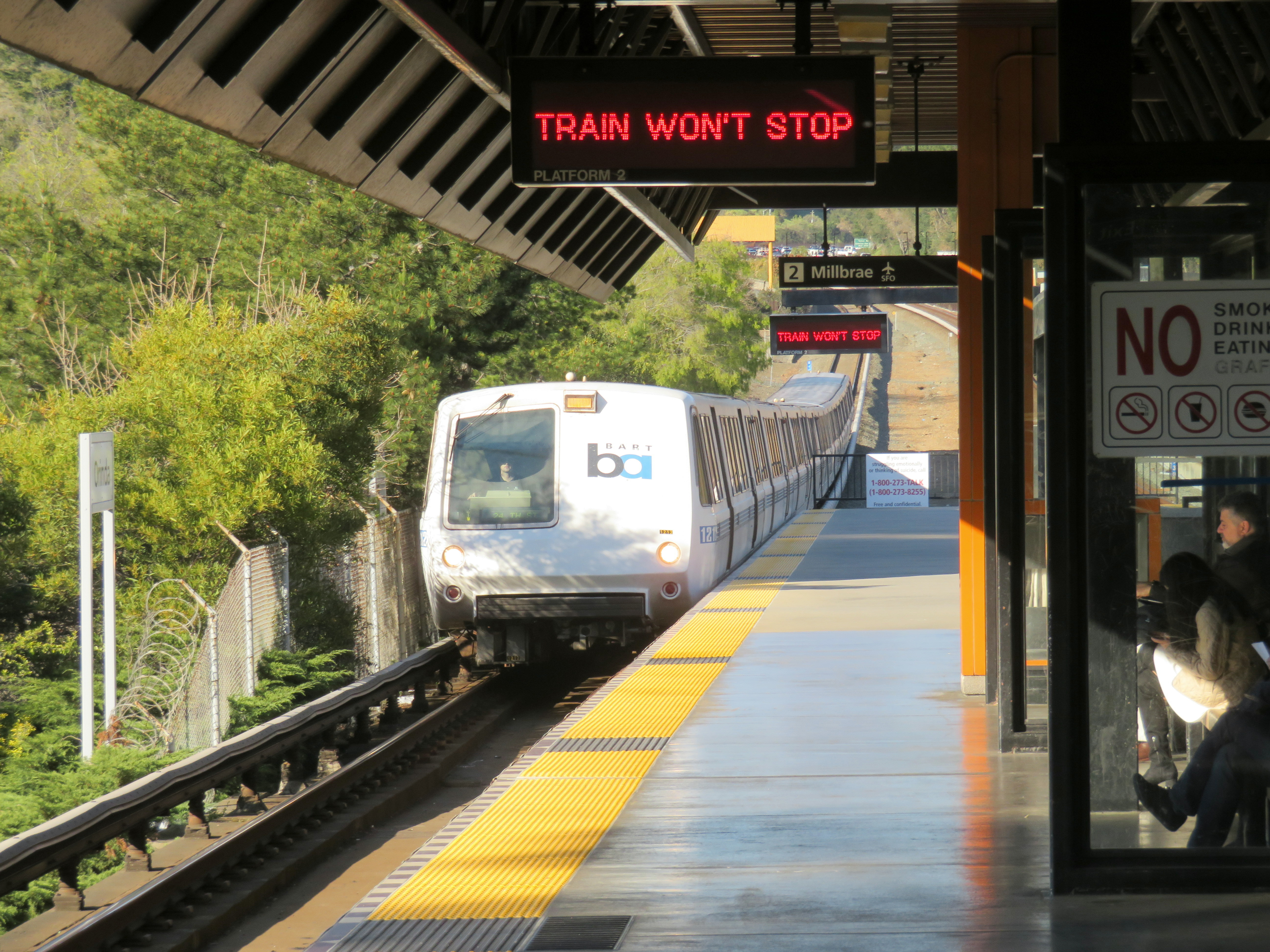
A westbound 24th Street Limited train bypassing Orinda station

The Yellow Line was the second of BART's five rapid transit lines to open. Service from Concord to MacArthur began on May 21, 1973. The line was extended to Daly City when the Transbay Tube opened on September 16, 1974. The North Concord/Martinez, Colma, and Pittsburg/Bay Point stations were added in 1995–1996.

Until 2015, rush hour service included trains that short turned at Concord; these trains originated at Montgomery Street during the morning peak and returned to 24th Street Mission during the evening peak. On April 1, 2015, BART fully opened the Central Contra Costa Crossover, a pair of crossover tracks south of Pleasant Hill/Contra Costa Centre station that allow trains to terminate there. On September 14, 2015, the Concord short turns were cut to Pleasant Hill to allow for increased frequency. Reverse peak "Pleasant Hill Limited" trains bypassed Rockridge, Orinda, Lafayette, and Walnut Creek stations eastbound in the morning peak, and Lafayette and Orinda westbound in the evening. The short turn trains were re-extended to Concord on February 10, 2020. The extra commute trains were eliminated effective March 19, 2020, due to ridership decreases caused by the COVID-19 pandemic.

In March 2016, mysterious electrical surges caused several cars to be taken out of service on the tracks north of North Concord/Martinez station. On March 16, 2016, BART halted service to Pittsburg/Bay Point station and established a bus bridge between North Concord and Pittsburg/Bay Point. Limited service to Pittsburg/Bay Point resumed on March 21 and full service resumed on April 2.

=== SFO/Millbrae extension service ===
When the SFO/Millbrae extension opened on June 22, 2003, BART extended the Yellow Line to Millbrae but bypassed San Francisco International Airport station (SFO). BART rerouted this line to SFO in place of the Blue Line on February 9, 2004, with service extended to Millbrae outside of weekday peak hours.

San Mateo County is not a member of the San Francisco Bay Area Rapid Transit District, so SamTrans funded the county's BART service. When the extension's lower-than-expected ridership caused SamTrans to accrue deficits, BART agreed to SamTrans' request to operate only the Blue Line south of Daly City effective September 12, 2005.

SamTrans and BART reached an agreement in February 2007 in which SamTrans would transfer control and financial responsibility of the SFO/Millbrae extension to BART, in return for BART receiving additional fixed funding from SamTrans and other sources. In January 2008, BART re-extended the line to SFO at all times, and in September 2009, trains were further extended to Millbrae on evenings and weekends.

Beginning on February 10, 2020, the Yellow Line again terminated at SFO at all times, and service from SFO to Millbrae was once again provided by the Purple Line. Yellow and Purple line trains were interlined on Sundays, with no transfer required at SFO. Beginning on March 22, 2021, the Yellow and Purple lines were interlined on both Saturdays and Sundays. On August 2, 2021, the Purple Line was eliminated as a separate service, with the Yellow Line extended to Millbrae on evenings and Sundays when the Red Line was not operating.

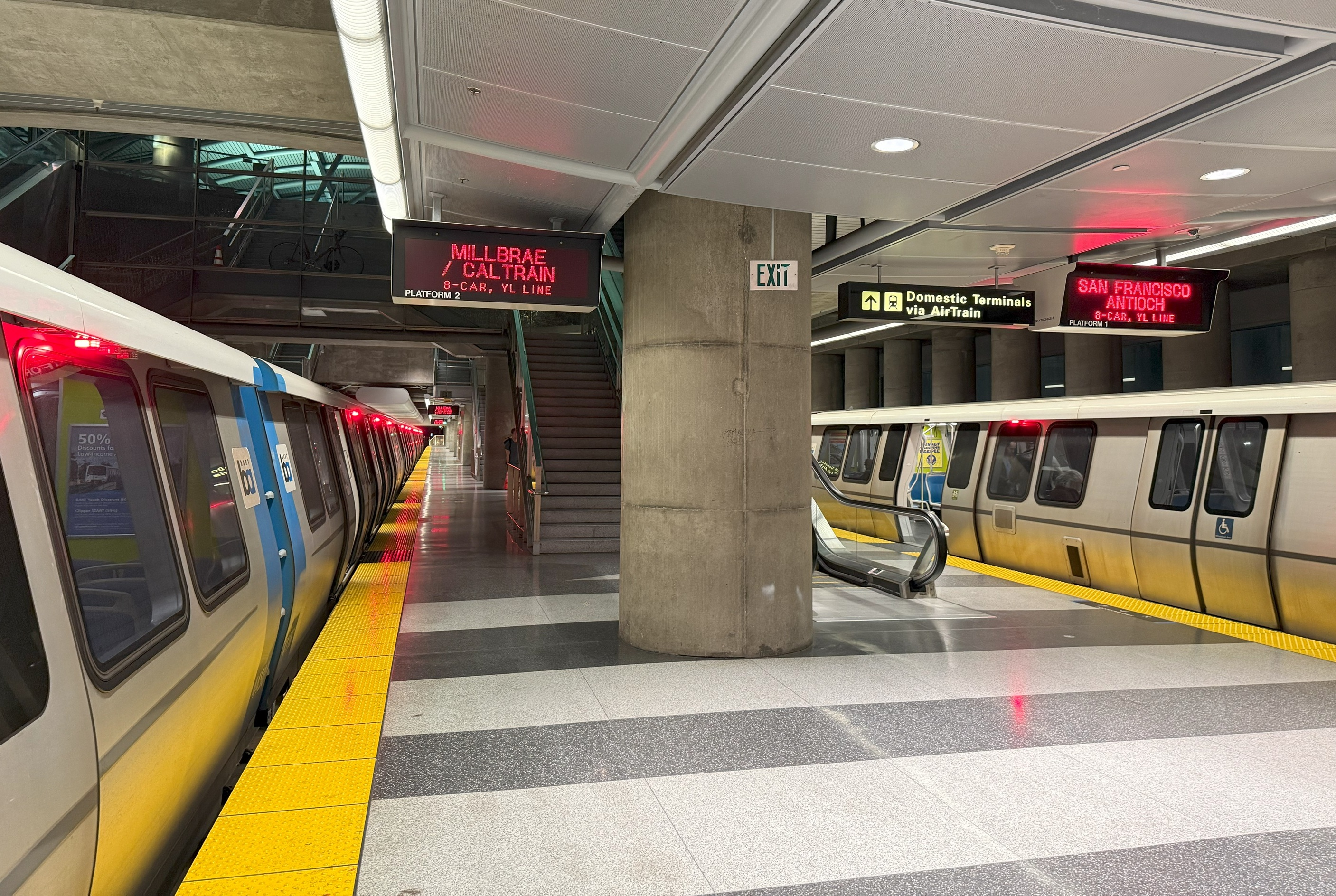
SFO–Millbrae shuttle and main Yellow Line train at SFO in 2025

On January 13, 2025, a shuttle train began operating between SFO and Millbrae between 9 pm and midnight due to the installation of Communications Based Train Control equipment near Millbrae. It is signed as part of the Yellow Line.

Yellow Line's south-of-Daly City service
Date of change	Service pattern
June 22, 2003	Daly City–Millbrae
February 9, 2004	Daly City–SFO (weekday peak hours); Daly City–SFO/Millbrae (all other times)
September 12, 2005	none
January 1, 2008	Daly City–SFO
September 14, 2009	Daly City–SFO (weekdays); Daly City–SFO/Millbrae (evenings/weekends)
February 11, 2019	Daly City–SFO (weekdays/Sundays); Daly City–SFO/Millbrae (nights/Saturdays)
February 11, 2020	Daly City–SFO
August 2, 2021	Daly City–SFO (weekdays/Saturdays); Daly City–SFO/Millbrae (evenings/Sundays)
February 14, 2022	Daly City–SFO (until 9 pm); Daly City–SFO/Millbrae (after 9 pm)

=== Antioch extension service ===
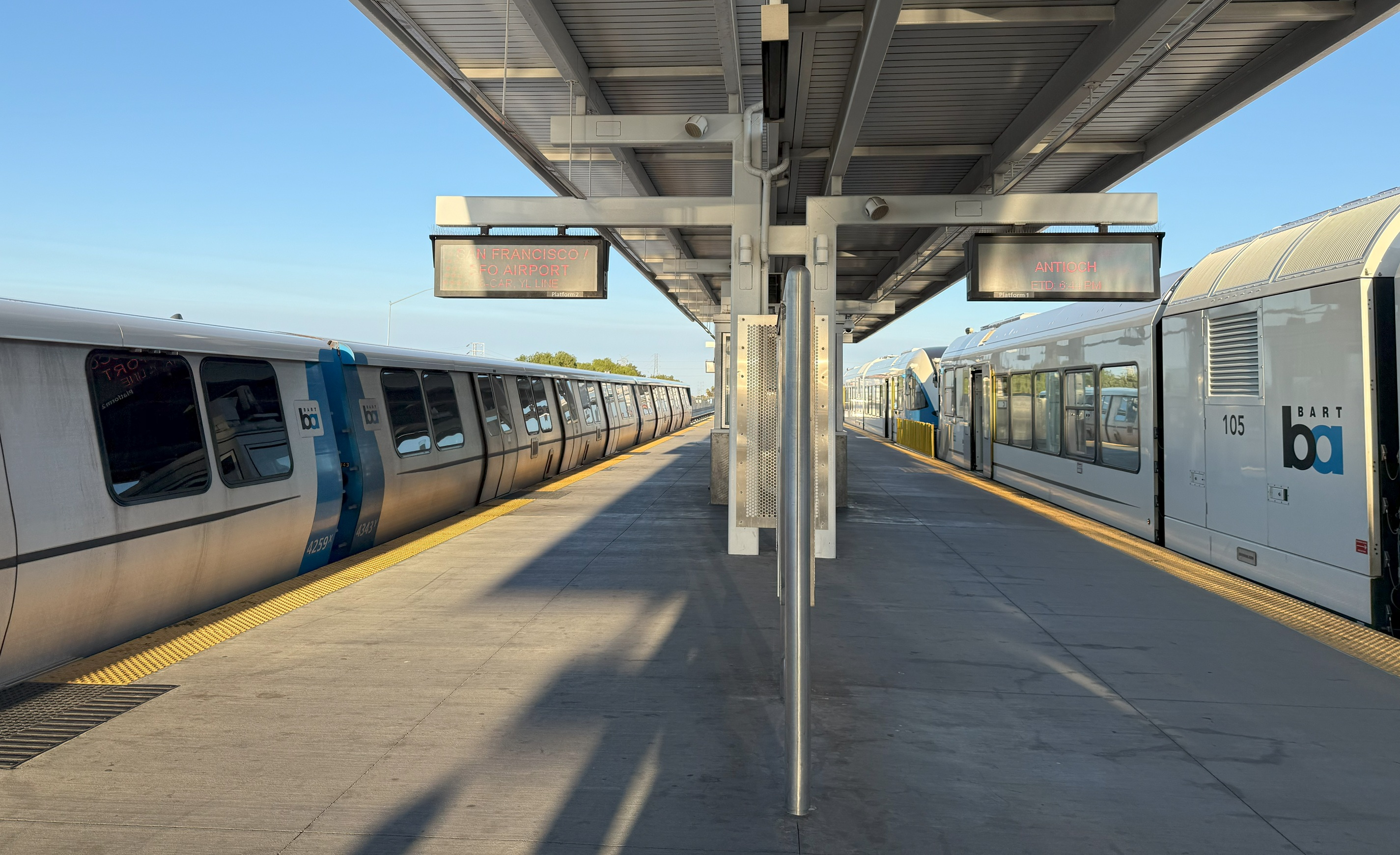
eBART and main Yellow Line trains at the transfer platform in 2025

BART to Antioch, named during construction and commonly known as eBART (East Contra Costa BART Extension), is a diesel multiple unit (DMU) light rail branch line of the Bay Area Rapid Transit (BART) system in eastern Contra Costa County, California, United States. Service starts at Pittsburg/Bay Point station and extends 8.6 miles (13.8 km) east to Antioch station.

Trains and tracks for the portion of the Yellow Line between Antioch and Pittsburg/Bay Point are incompatible with those of the main BART rapid transit system, making it impossible for trains to move between the two systems; instead, passengers transfer via a cross platform interchange at an auxiliary BART stop to the east of Pittsburg/Bay Point – the BART to Antioch platform is accessible only via an intra-station ride from the main station to this auxiliary stop. Revenue service began on May 26, 2018.

The BART map does not differentiate between this service and the remainder of the Yellow Line. There is a notation on the maps published in stations and dynamically displayed on trains showing a transfer is required, but not on the schedule or map brochures distributed to the public.

== Stations ==
Station	Jurisdiction	County	Opened	Rail connections
Pittsburg/Bay Point	Pittsburg/Bay Point	Contra Costa	December 7, 1996	BART: Yellow Line (eBART)
North Concord/Martinez	Concord	Contra Costa	December 16, 1995	
Concord	Concord	Contra Costa	May 21, 1973	
Pleasant Hill/Contra Costa Centre	Contra Costa Centre	Contra Costa	May 21, 1973	
Walnut Creek	Walnut Creek	Contra Costa	May 21, 1973	
Lafayette	Lafayette	Contra Costa	May 21, 1973	
Orinda	Orinda	Contra Costa	May 21, 1973	
Rockridge	Oakland	Alameda	May 21, 1973	
MacArthur	Oakland	Alameda	September 11, 1972	BART:
19th Street Oakland	Oakland	Alameda	September 11, 1972	BART:
12th Street Oakland City Center	Oakland	Alameda	September 11, 1972	BART:
West Oakland	Oakland	Alameda	September 16, 1974	BART:
Embarcadero	San Francisco		May 27, 1976	BART: Muni: Cable Cars
Montgomery Street	San Francisco		November 5, 1973	BART: Muni:
Powell Street	San Francisco		November 5, 1973	BART: Muni: Cable Cars
Civic Center/UN Plaza	San Francisco		November 5, 1973	BART: Muni:
16th Street Mission	San Francisco		November 5, 1973	BART:
24th Street Mission	San Francisco		November 5, 1973	BART:
Glen Park	San Francisco		November 5, 1973	BART: Muni:
Balboa Park	San Francisco		November 5, 1973	BART: Muni:
Daly City	Daly City	San Mateo	November 5, 1973	BART:
Colma	Colma	San Mateo	February 24, 1996	BART:
South San Francisco	South San Francisco	San Mateo	June 22, 2003	BART:
San Bruno	San Bruno	San Mateo	June 22, 2003	BART:
San Francisco International Airport	SFO	San Mateo	June 22, 2003	BART: AirTrain to SFO
Millbrae (after 9pm)	Millbrae	San Mateo	June 22, 2003	BART: Caltrain
