= North Concord/Martinez station =

Rapid transit station in San Francisco Bay Area

N Concord / Martinez
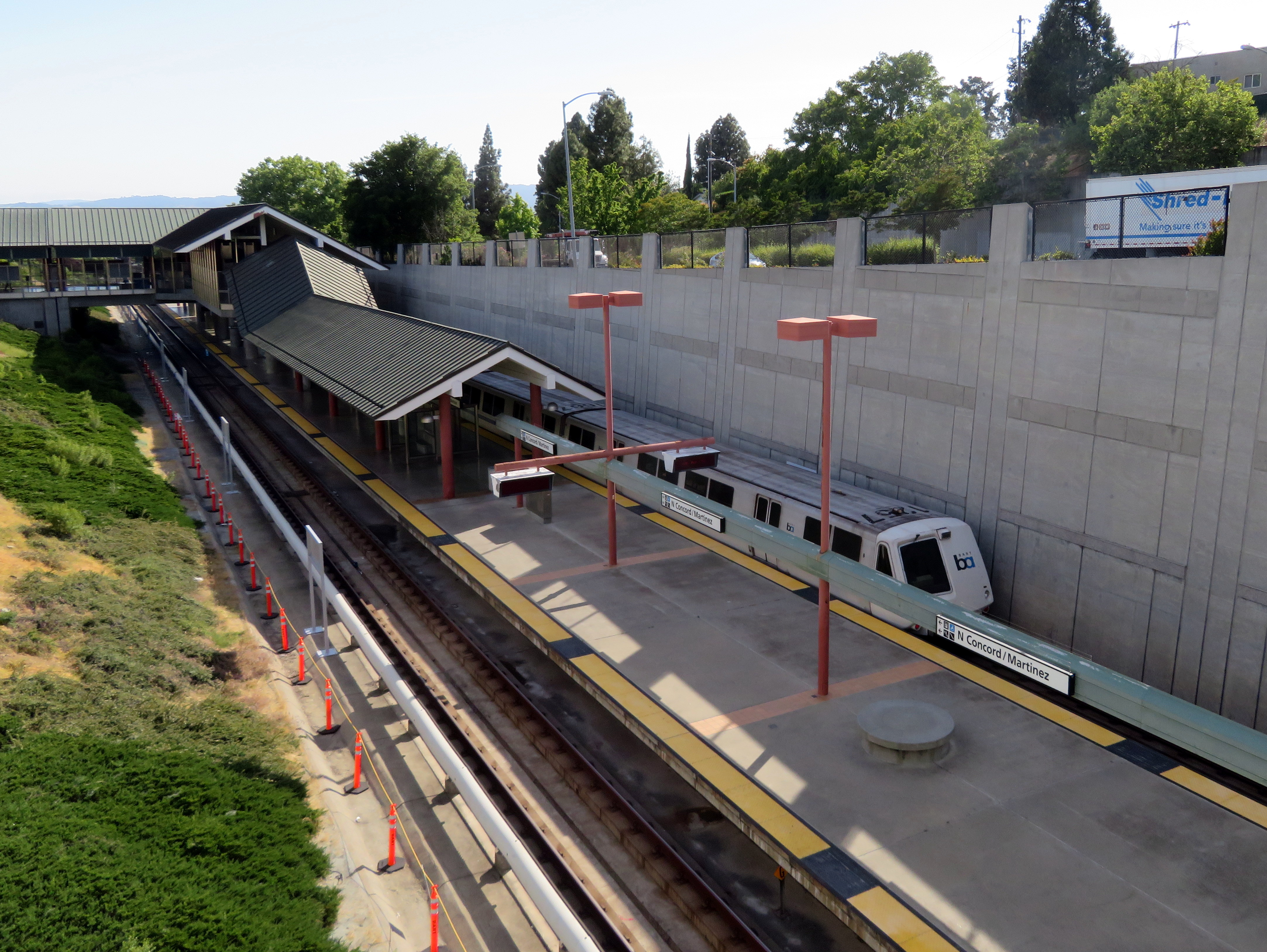
- A southbound train at North Concord/Martinez station in 2018

General information
- Location: 3700 Port Chicago Highway; Concord, California
- Coordinates: 38.003273°N 122.024599°W
- Line: BART C-Line
- Platforms: 1 island platform
- Tracks: 2
- Connections: County Connection: 17, 28, 99X, 627

Construction
- Parking: 1,977 spaces
- Cycle facilities: 30 lockers
- Accessible: Yes
- Architect: IDG Architects

Other information
- Station code: BART: NCON

History
- Opened: December 16, 1995

Passengers
- 2025: 695 (weekday average)

Services
Preceding station	Bay Area Rapid Transit	Following station
Concord toward SFO or Millbrae	Yellow Line	Pittsburg/Bay Point toward Antioch via Pittsburg/Bay Point
Location

North Concord/Martinez station is a Bay Area Rapid Transit (BART) station located in the Sun Terrace neighborhood of Concord, California, United States. The station serves the northern area of Concord and nearby Martinez. It is located near State Route 4. It is served by the Yellow Line.

== History ==
The North Concord/Martinez station opened on December 16, 1995. It served as the terminal station of the line until December 7, 1996, when the extension over Willow Pass to Pittsburg/Bay Point station opened. The station briefly served as the terminus again from March 16–21, 2016 (and at off-peak times until April 2), after electrical issues north of the station damaged a number of trains. Some peak hour trains began short turns at North Concord in 2003.

Sandwiched between low-density residential areas to the west and the Concord Naval Weapons Station to the east, it is among the least-used stations on the BART system, with 695 daily boardings in November 2025. A 2018 study recommended a footbridge over the BART tracks south of the station to improve access from the adjacent neighborhood.

In August 2018, BART solicited developer proposals for transit-oriented development to replace the surface parking lots at the station. A developer team was chosen in December 2018, but withdrew in March 2019 due to the two developers failing to reach an internal agreement. BART chose a new developer in August 2019. That developer withdrew in April 2022, possibly because of delays with plans for a much larger development of the Naval Weapons Station property; BART considered proposals by other developers. As of 2024, BART indicates "significant market, local support, and/or implementation barriers" that must be overcome to allow TOD at the station, and that such development would not begin until at least the mid-2030s.
