= Vallejo Transit Center =

Transit station in California, U.S.

Vallejo Station
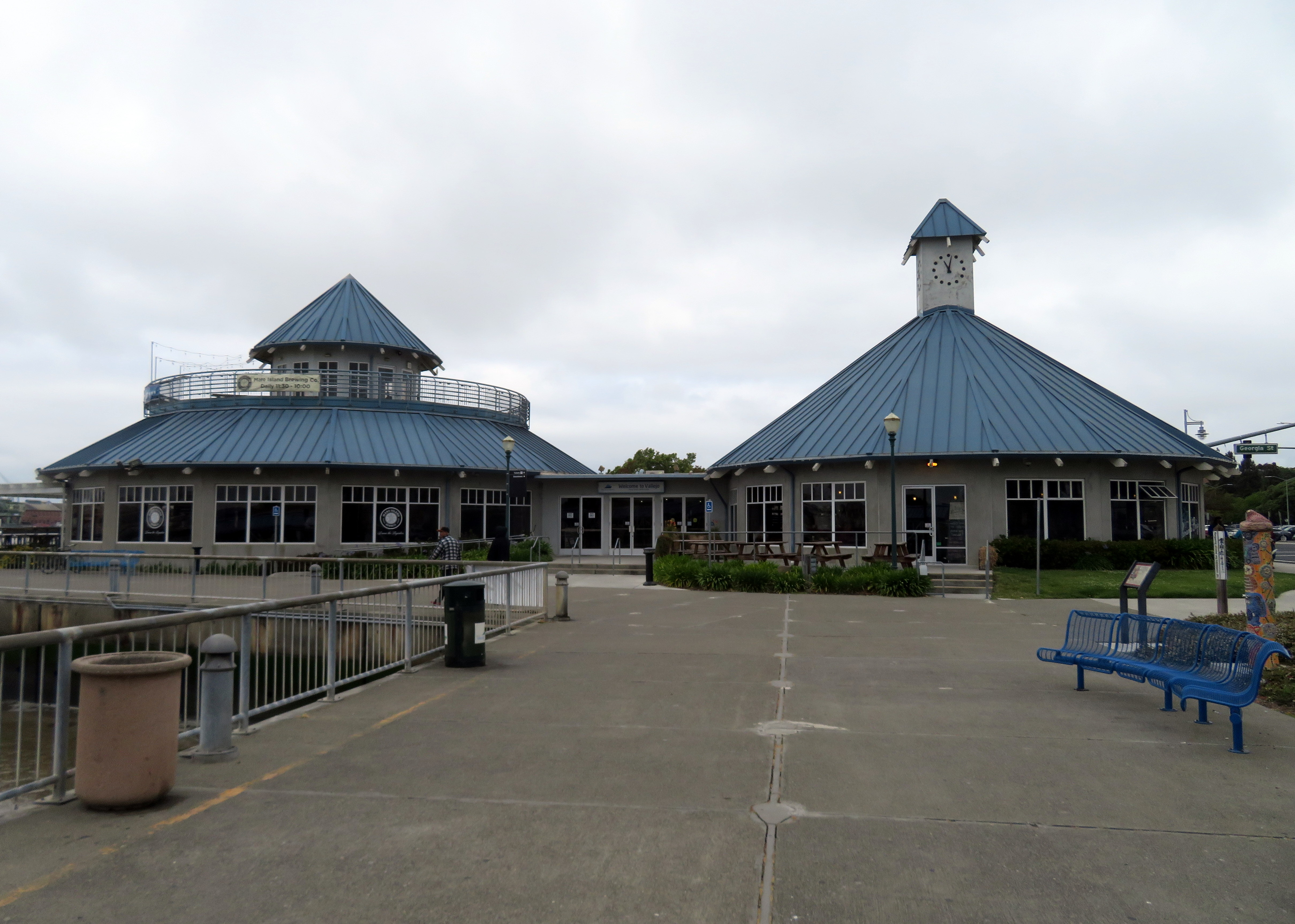
- The Vallejo Ferry Terminal at Vallejo Station in May 2019

General information
- Location: 289 Mare Island Way (ferry terminal); 311 Sacramento Street (transit center); Vallejo, California 94590; United States
- Coordinates: 38.100534°N 122.26303°W
- Operator: San Francisco Bay Ferry; SolTrans
- Connections: Vallejo Ferry; Vallejo Giants Ferry; Greyhound; Amtrak Thruway: 7; SolTrans: 1, 2, 3, 4, 5, 6, 7, 8, Red, Yellow, 82; VINE: 11, 11X

Construction
- Accessible: Disabled access
Location

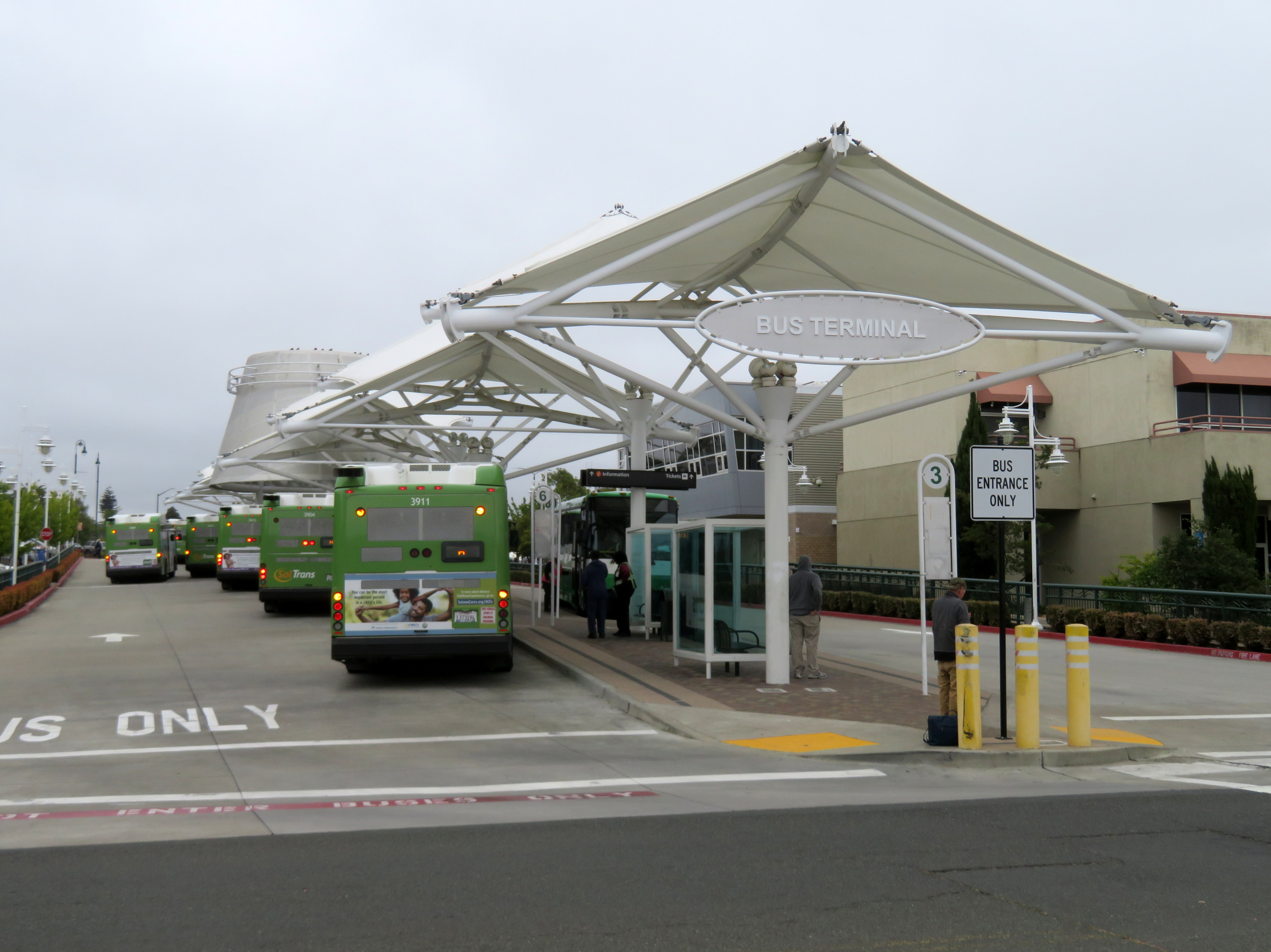
The Vallejo Transit Center bus station in May 2019

Vallejo Station is the project name of an intermodal transit station in the western part of Central Vallejo, California. The station comprises the Vallejo Transit Center bus station, Vallejo Ferry Terminal, and a connecting multi-story parking garage.

A California Historical Landmark marker at the transit center denotes the site of the former California State Capitol in Vallejo.

The development of the Vallejo Station complex is part of a larger plan to redevelop the entire Vallejo Waterfront consisting of a total of 92 acres (37 ha). As of 2023, the plan has not been completed.

== Vallejo Transit Center ==
The Vallejo Transit Center serves as the headquarters and central transfer point for SolTrans, which provides public bus service to Solano County. VINE Transit provides bus service to Napa County. Additional intercity bus service bus service is provided by Flixbus, Amtrak, and Greyhound Lines.

The City of Vallejo contracted with STV Incorporated to build the Transit Center. It has 12 bays for buses. The Transit Center opened in 2011.

The SolTrans and VINE Transit routes that serve the Transit Center are:

- Soltrans: local routes 1, 2, 3, 4, 5, 6, & 7; express routes Red, Yellow, and 82.
- VINE Transit: local route 11; express route 11X (stops at ferry terminal only).

== Vallejo Ferry Terminal ==
The ferry terminal serves as a through stop and part-time terminal for the Vallejo Ferry, which travels between Mare Island and Pier 41 at Fisherman's Wharf in San Francisco, making stops at Vallejo and the San Francisco Ferry Building along the way, however, both Mare Island and Pier 41 are also part-time terminals for the ferry, and most trips on the ferry only serve Vallejo and the Ferry Building.

Vallejo Ferry Terminal additionally serves as the northern terminal for the seasonal ferry to Oracle Park for San Francisco Giants baseball games. The Vallejo Giants Ferry only operates on weekday evenings and weekends for select Giants home games throughout the Major League Baseball season; weekday evening service only operates northbound from Oracle Park to Vallejo 20 minutes after the last out of the game, while weekend service operates bidirectionally between Vallejo and Oracle Park, also returning to Vallejo 20 minutes after the last out of the game.

The Vallejo Ferry Terminal Ticket Office was closed on August 14th, 2022, with passengers instructed to either use Clipper cards, purchase e-tickets through the San Francisco Bay Ferry mobile app, or purchase paper tickets on board the ferry.

The Vallejo Convention and Visitor's Bureau headquarters is also located inside of the Ferry Terminal.

== Parking garage ==
The Phase A of the parking garage was completed in 2012 at a cost of US$74 million. The first phase had parking for 750 cars. This completed the creation of Vallejo Station development. Plans to build a parking garage, in two sections, were first suggested in 1987. Phase B will expand the garage near the Vallejo Ferry Terminal.

In 2022, the parking garage earned US$850,000 in revenue not counting parking fines, which nearly covers the cost of operating the garage, including paying for security. Prior to 2020, the parking garage revenues peaked at US$1.4 million, which provided US$500,000 in revenue to the city government.

By 2023, crime in the parking garage had become a problem, especially theft of items inside of cars and of catalytic converters. “That garage is a nightmare,” said Vallejo City Council member Mina Loera-Diaz during a city council meeting. “A lot of people figure ‘it’s covered, it has to be safe, I’m not going to park on the street’ – and it's from that garage where they are taking the most catalytic converters.”
