= Pleasant Hill/Contra Costa Centre station =

Rapid transit station in California, US

Pleasant Hill/Contra Costa Centre
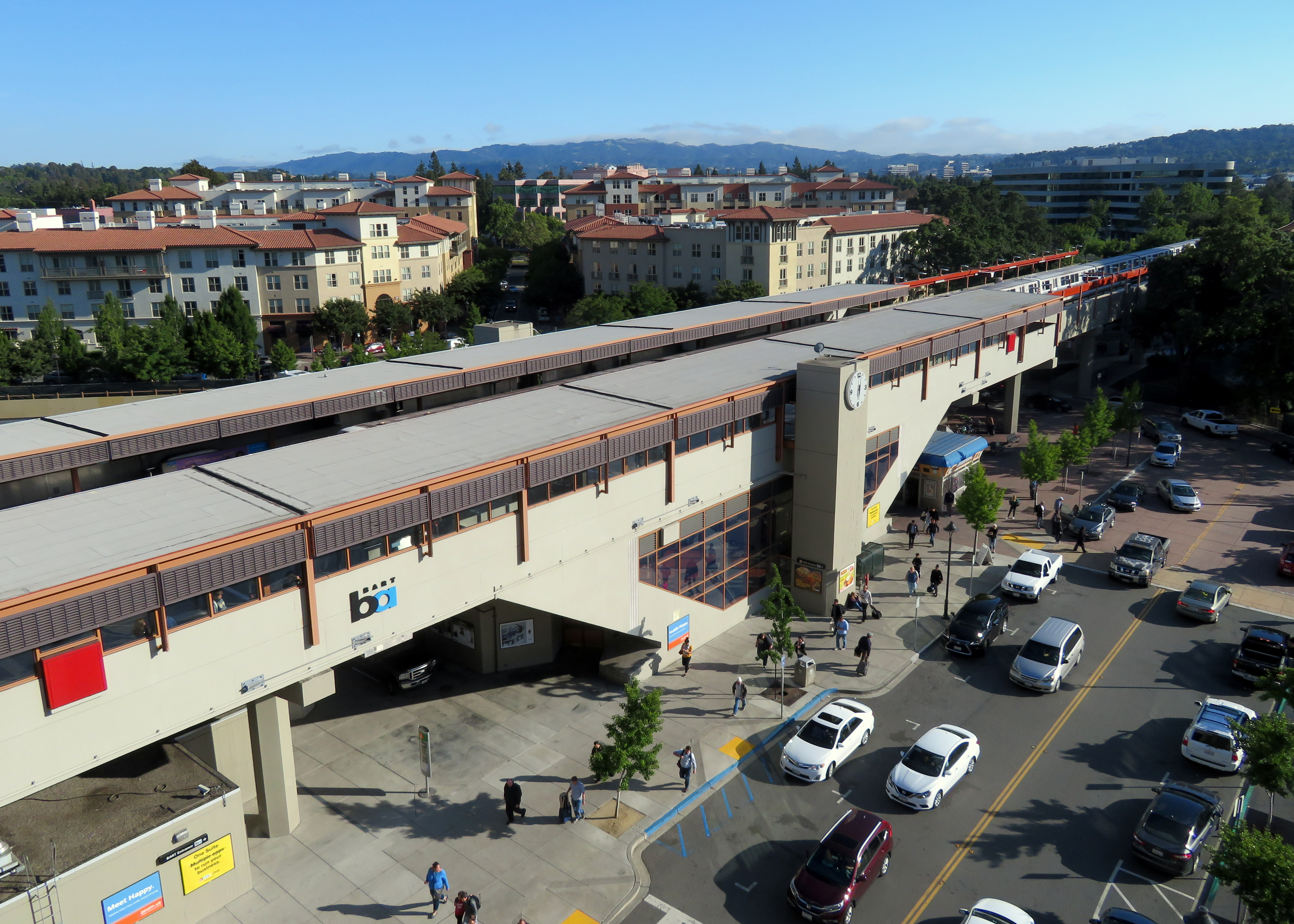
- The station viewed from the parking garage in 2018

General information
- Location: 1365 Treat Boulevard; Walnut Creek, California
- Coordinates: 37.928399°N 122.055992°W
- Line: BART C-Line
- Platforms: 2 side platforms
- Connections: AC Transit: 702; County Connection: 7, 9, 11, 14, 15, 18, 311, 316; SolanoExpress: Blue, Yellow

Construction
- Structure type: Elevated
- Parking: 3,011 spaces
- Cycle facilities: 90 lockers
- Accessible: Yes
- Architect: Gwathmey, Sellier & Crosby; Joseph Esherick & Associates

Other information
- Station code: BART: PHIL

History
- Opened: May 21, 1973

Passengers
- 2025: 2,750 (weekday average)

Services
Preceding station	Bay Area Rapid Transit	Following station
Walnut Creek toward SFO or Millbrae	Yellow Line	Concord toward Antioch via Pittsburg/Bay Point
Location

Pleasant Hill/Contra Costa Centre station is a Bay Area Rapid Transit (BART) station serving the Contra Costa Centre Transit Village in Contra Costa Centre, California, just north of Walnut Creek and just east of Pleasant Hill. It is served by the Yellow Line.

== Station design ==
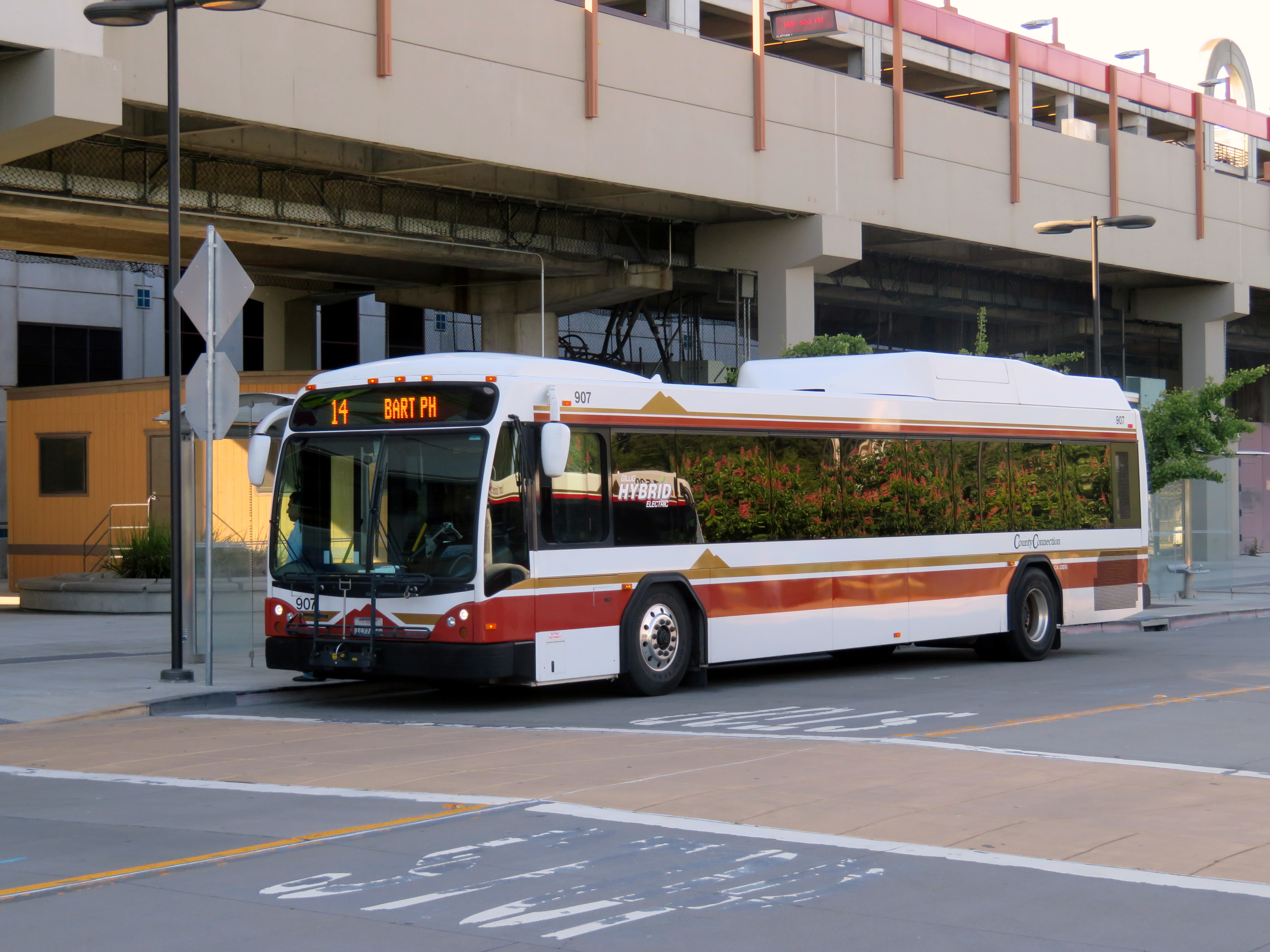
County Connection bus at the station

Pleasant Hill/Contra Costa Centre station is located in the unincorporated Contra Costa Centre area of Contra Costa County, slightly east of Interstate 680 and south of incorporated Pleasant Hill. The two elevated tracks of the BART C-Line run northeast–southwest through the station location, with two side platforms at the station. All buses stop on a two-way busway on the southeast side of the station. Pleasant Hill/Contra Costa Centre is a transfer point for a number of County Connection local routes:

- Weekday: 7, 9, 11, 14, 15, 18
- Weekend: 311, 316

The station is also served by several longer-distance routes: the Solano Express Blue Line and Yellow Line, WHEELS route 70X, and AC Transit Early Bird Express route 702.

== History ==
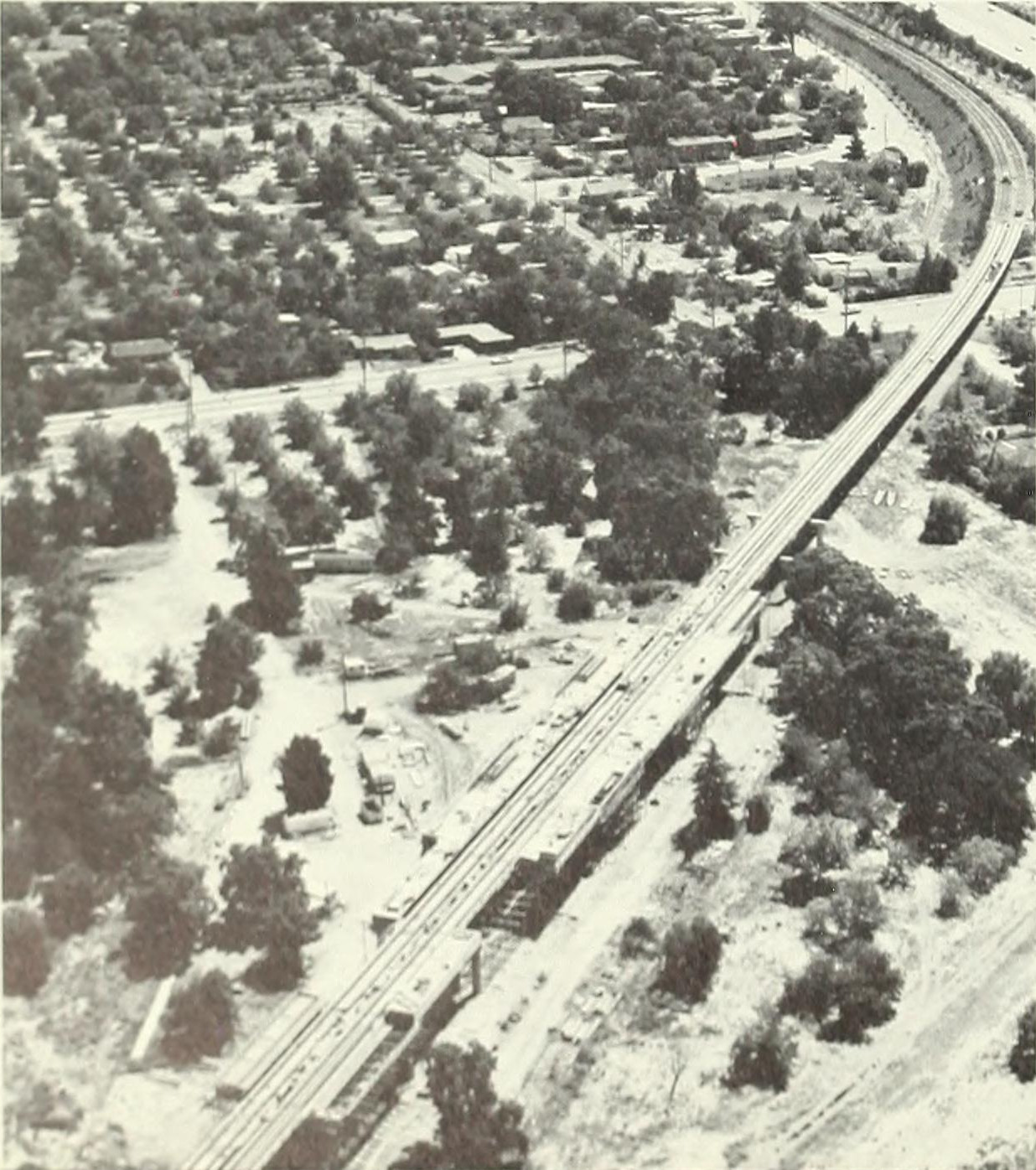
Pleasant Hill station under construction in 1970

The BART Board approved the name Pleasant Hill in December 1965. Service at the station began on May 21, 1973. AC Transit bus service began in Pleasant Hill on December 8, 1975, with Pleasant Hill station as a hub. The service was taken over by County Connection in 1982. By 2002, Pleasant Hill had the most parking spaces of any BART station, with 3,398 spaces in a garage and surface lots. A BART plan released that year proposed expansion of the paid fare lobby and the platforms. Seismic retrofitting of the parking garage took place in 2008–2009.

Walnut Creek station was originally intended to serve the surrounding low-density suburban neighborhoods. However, apartment complexes and mid-rise office buildings were soon constructed nearby. County plans approved in 1983 and 1984 initiated the concept of a "transit village" of mixed-use transit-oriented development around the station. Planning began around 2001 to replace the surface parking lots with a transit village. The plan called for three mixed-use buildings south of the station, an office building west of the station, and expansion of the parking garage north of the station.

Construction of the second parking garage began in March 2006. The garage opened on June 30, 2008, at a cost of $51.2 million; the surface parking lots were closed at that time. Construction of mixed-use buildings (Block A and Block B) began the next month. The two buildings, as well as a $12 million footbridge carrying the Iron Horse Regional Trail over Treat Boulevard, were opened in October 2010.

On September 23, 2010, the BART Board voted to change the station name to Pleasant Hill/Contra Costa Centre to reflect the name of the transit village. The name change was supported by the transit village developer and the Contra Costa County Redevelopment Agency, but opposed by the city of Pleasant Hill. The Contra Costa County Redevelopment Agency and the developer paid the $413,800 cost of changing station signage and system maps.

Construction of a third building in the transit village, Block C, took place from 2018 to 2020. In March 2024, the BART Board approved plans to change the approved office building (Block D) to residential use.
