= Contra Costa Centre, California =

Contra Costa Centre
- Unincorporated Community; Census Designated Place
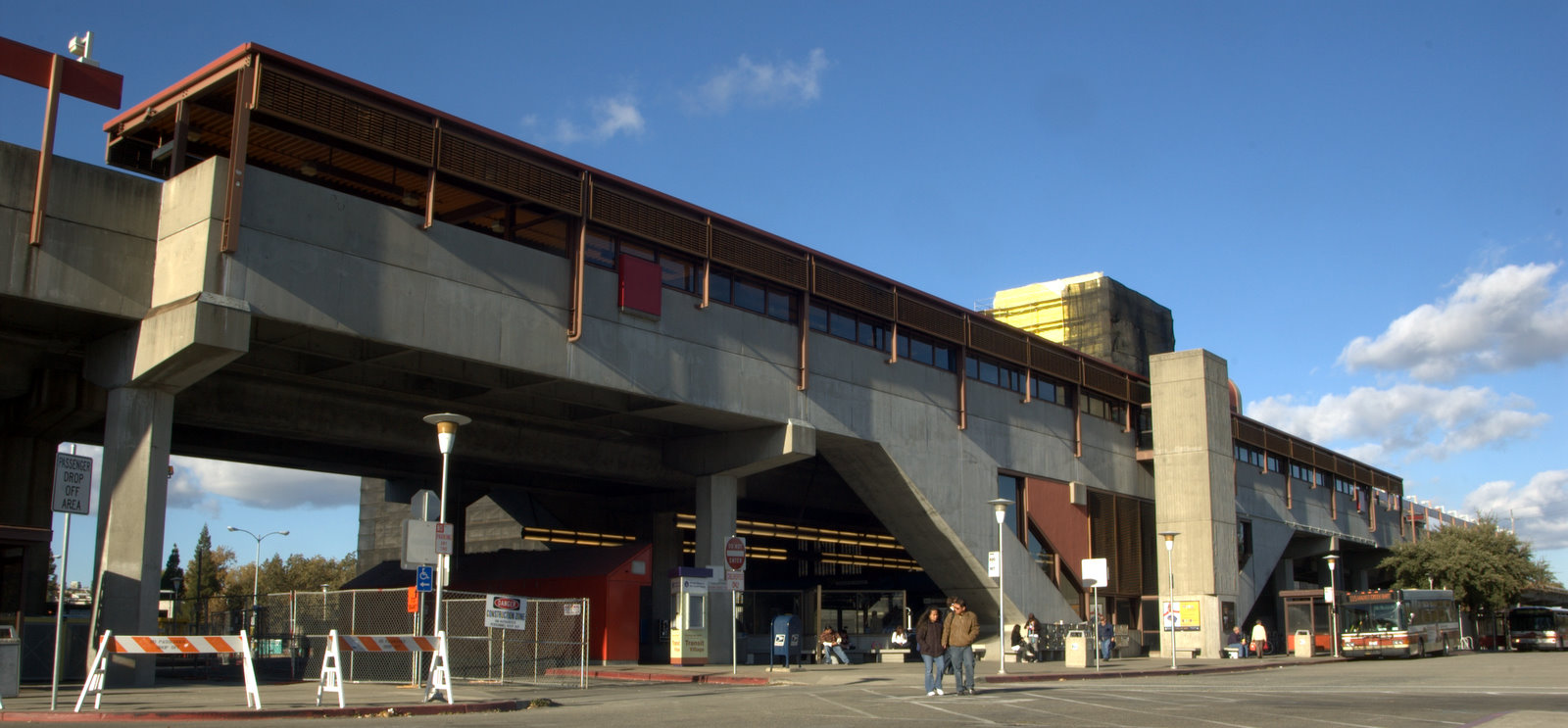
- Contra Costa Centre is served by the Pleasant Hill / Contra Costa Centre BART Station.

- Location of Contra Costa Centre in Contra Costa County, California

- Position in California Contra Costa Centre (Northern California) Contra Costa Centre (California) Contra Costa Centre (the United States)
- Coordinates: 37°55′34″N 122°03′14″W
- Country: United States
- State: California
- County: Contra Costa

Area
  - Total: 0.64 sq mi (1.65 km^{2})
  - Land: 0.64 sq mi (1.65 km^{2})
  - Water: 0 sq mi (0.00 km^{2}) 0%
- Elevation: 92 ft (28 m)

Population (2020)
  - Total: 6,808
  - Density: 10,692.6/sq mi (4,128.45/km^{2})
- Time zone: UTC-8 (Pacific (PST))
  - Summer (DST): UTC-7 (PDT)
- GNIS feature ID: 2409521

Contra Costa Centre is an unincorporated community and census-designated place in Contra Costa County, California, United States. Contra Costa Centre sits at an elevation of 92 feet (28 m). The 2010 United States census reported Contra Costa Centre's population was 5,364, while the 2020 census figure was 6,808. Contra Costa Centre is served by the Pleasant Hill / Contra Costa Centre BART station.

It is the successor to the Waldon CDP of the 2000 census.

== Geography ==
According to the United States Census Bureau, the CDP has a total area of 0.642 square miles (1.662 km^{2}), all land.

== Demographics ==
Historical population
Census	Pop.	Note	%±
2000	5,133		—
2010	5,364		4.5%
2020	6,808		26.9%
U.S. Decennial Census; 1850–1870 1880-1890; 1900 1910 1920; 1930 1940 1950; 1960 1970 1980; 1990 2000 2010

Contra Costa Centre first appeared as a census designated place in the 2000 U.S. census under the name Waldon; The name was changed to Contra Costa Centre for the 2010 U.S. census.

=== Racial and ethnic composition ===
Contra Costa Centre CDP, California – Racial and ethnic composition Note: the US Census treats Hispanic/Latino as an ethnic category. This table excludes Latinos from the racial categories and assigns them to a separate category. Hispanics/Latinos may be of any race.
Race / Ethnicity (NH = Non-Hispanic)	Pop 2000	Pop 2010	Pop 2020	% 2000	% 2010	% 2020
White alone (NH)	3,702	3,182	3,234	72.12%	59.32%	47.50%
Black or African American alone (NH)	101	201	329	1.97%	3.75%	4.83%
Native American or Alaska Native alone (NH)	15	15	15	0.29%	0.28%	0.22%
Asian alone (NH)	805	1,142	1,822	15.68%	21.29%	26.76%
Native Hawaiian or Pacific Islander alone (NH)	13	15	16	0.25%	0.28%	0.24%
Other race alone (NH)	9	18	71	0.18%	0.34%	1.04%
Mixed race or Multiracial (NH)	171	231	488	3.33%	4.31%	7.17%
Hispanic or Latino (any race)	317	560	833	6.18%	10.44%	12.24%
Total	5,133	5,364	6,808	100.00%	100.00%	100.00%

=== 2020 census ===
As of the 2020 census, Contra Costa Centre had a population of 6,808 and a population density of 10,687.6 inhabitants per square mile (4,126.5/km^{2}).

The racial makeup of Contra Costa Centre was 50.3% White, 4.9% African American, 0.5% Native American, 27.0% Asian, 0.2% Pacific Islander, 5.1% from other races, and 11.8% from two or more races. Hispanic or Latino of any race were 12.2% of the population.

100.0% of residents lived in urban areas and 0.0% lived in rural areas. The census reported that 99.8% of the population lived in households, 0.2% lived in non-institutionalized group quarters, and no one was institutionalized.

There were 3,507 households in Contra Costa Centre, of which 18.6% had children under the age of 18 living in them. Of all households, 36.7% were married-couple households, 10.6% were cohabiting couple households, 24.3% were households with a male householder and no spouse or partner present, and 28.4% were households with a female householder and no spouse or partner present. About 39.5% of households were one person, and 7.3% had someone living alone who was 65 years of age or older. The average household size was 1.94, and there were 1,650 families (47.0% of all households).

The age distribution was 13.7% under the age of 18, 6.5% aged 18 to 24, 48.8% aged 25 to 44, 21.1% aged 45 to 64, and 9.9% who were 65 years of age or older. The median age was 34.6 years. For every 100 females, there were 95.2 males, and for every 100 females age 18 and over, there were 94.8 males age 18 and over.

There were 3,799 housing units at an average density of 5,963.9 units per square mile (2,302.7 units/km^{2}), of which 3,507 (92.3%) were occupied and 7.7% were vacant. Of occupied units, 21.8% were owner-occupied, and 78.2% were occupied by renters. The homeowner vacancy rate was 1.5% and the rental vacancy rate was 7.9%.

== Education ==
Much of Contra Costa Centre is in the Walnut Creek Elementary School District and the Acalanes Union High School District. Other parts are in the K-12 Mount Diablo Unified School District.
