= Concord station (BART) =

Rapid transit station in San Francisco Bay Area

Concord
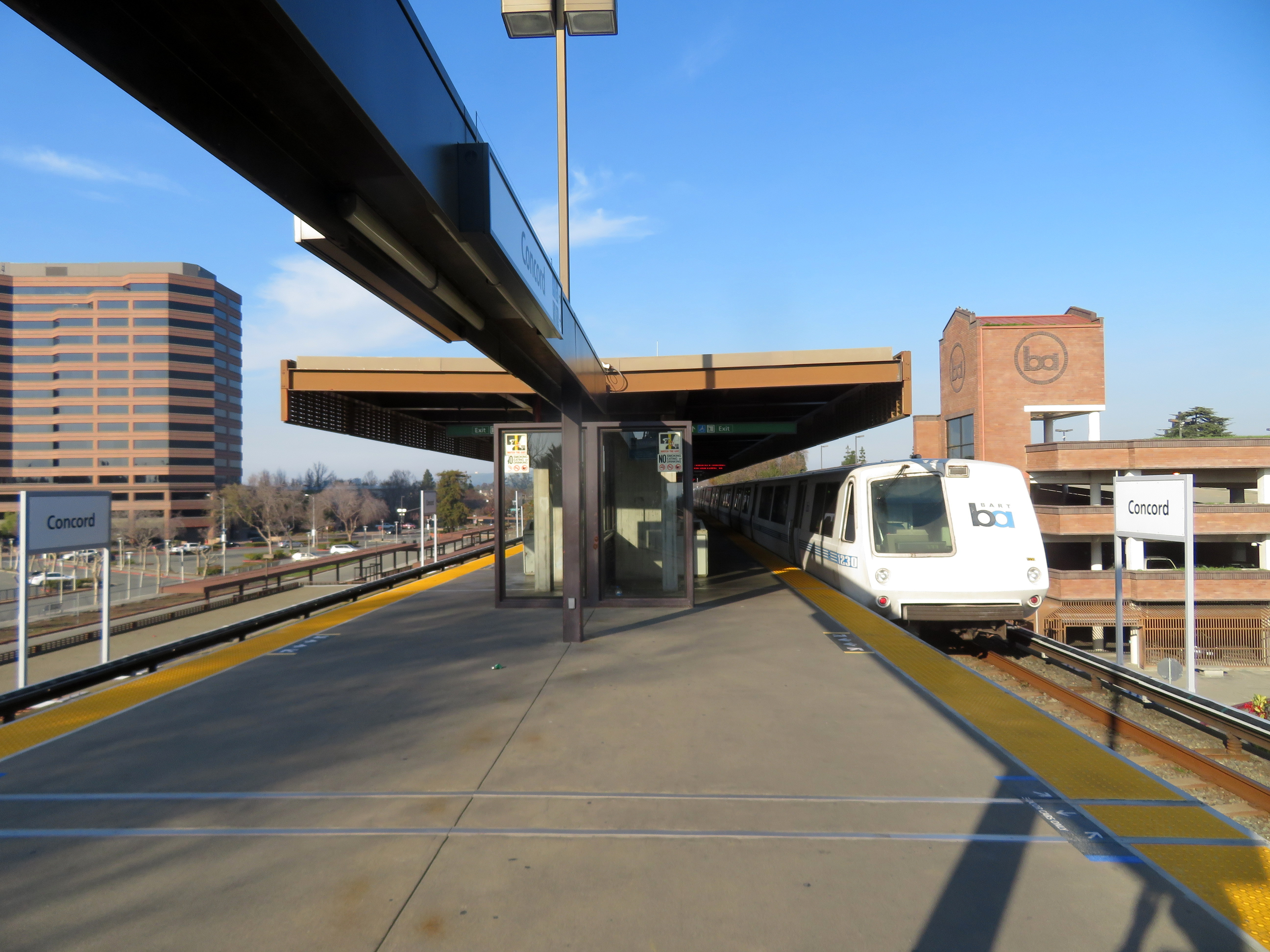
- A northbound train leaving Concord station in February 2020

General information
- Location: 1451 Oakland Avenue; Concord, California
- Coordinates: 37.973745°N 122.029127°W
- Line: BART C-Line
- Platforms: 1 island platform
- Tracks: 2
- Connections: Concord Pavilion Shuttle; County Connection: 10, 11, 14, 15, 16, 17, 19, 20, 28, 91X, 260, 310, 311, 314, 315, 320, 715; Tri Delta Transit: 201X

Construction
- Structure type: Elevated
- Parking: 2,367 spaces
- Cycle facilities: 40 lockers
- Accessible: Yes
- Architect: Gwathmey, Sellier & Crosby; Joseph Esherick & Associates

Other information
- Station code: BART: CONC

History
- Opened: May 21, 1973

Passengers
- 2025: 2,815 (weekday average)

Services
Preceding station	Bay Area Rapid Transit	Following station
Pleasant Hill/Contra Costa Centre toward SFO or Millbrae	Yellow Line	North Concord/Martinez toward Antioch via Pittsburg/Bay Point
Location

Concord station is a Bay Area Rapid Transit (BART) station in Concord, California. The station is located between the downtown business district to the west and residential neighborhoods to the east. Concord station has a single elevated island platform and is served by the Yellow Line.

== History ==
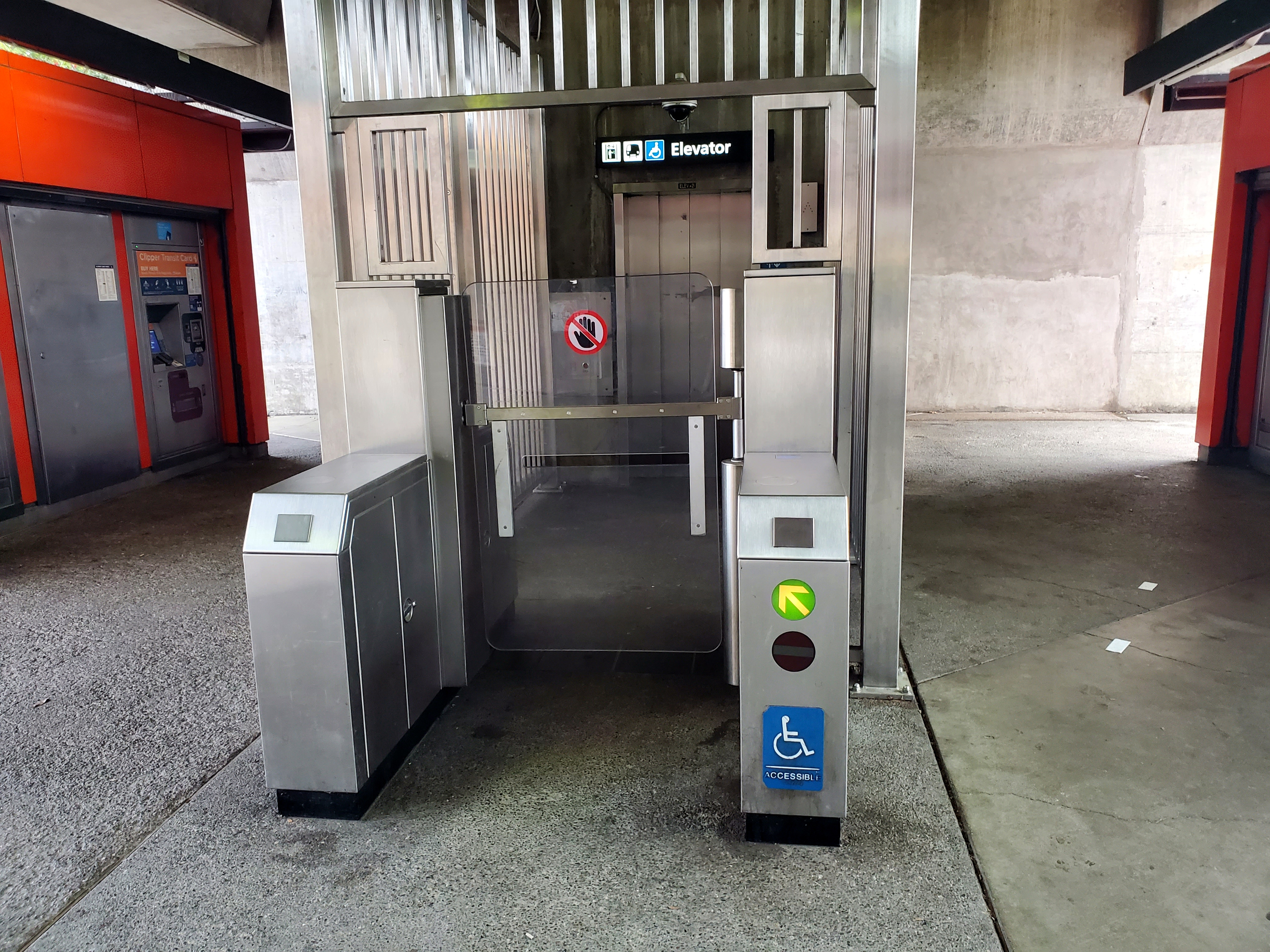
The 2020-installed elevator faregate

The BART Board approved the name "Concord" in December 1965. The station opened as the eastern terminus station of the BART system on May 21, 1973. AC Transit bus service began in Concord on September 8, 1975, with Concord station as a hub. The service was taken over by County Connection in 1982.

A water feature at the station, installed by Stephen De Staebler in 1971 or 1972, was removed in the 1990s. The station remained a terminus until the line was extended to North Concord/Martinez station in December 1995 and to Pittsburg/Bay Point station a year later. Seismic retrofitting of the station and parking garage took place in 2009–2010.

A conceptual design for modernization of the station was released in 2016. The design called for consolidation of the bus platforms, relocation of the platform elevator, a new stairway, and extension of the platform canopy. Thirteen BART stations, including Concord, did not originally have faregates for passengers using the elevator. In 2020, BART started a project to add faregates to elevators at these stations. The new faregate in the lobby area of Concord station was installed in October 2020.

As of 2024, BART anticipates soliciting a developer between 2029 and 2033 for transit oriented development near the station, with a second phase to later replace surface parking lots.

== Bus connections ==
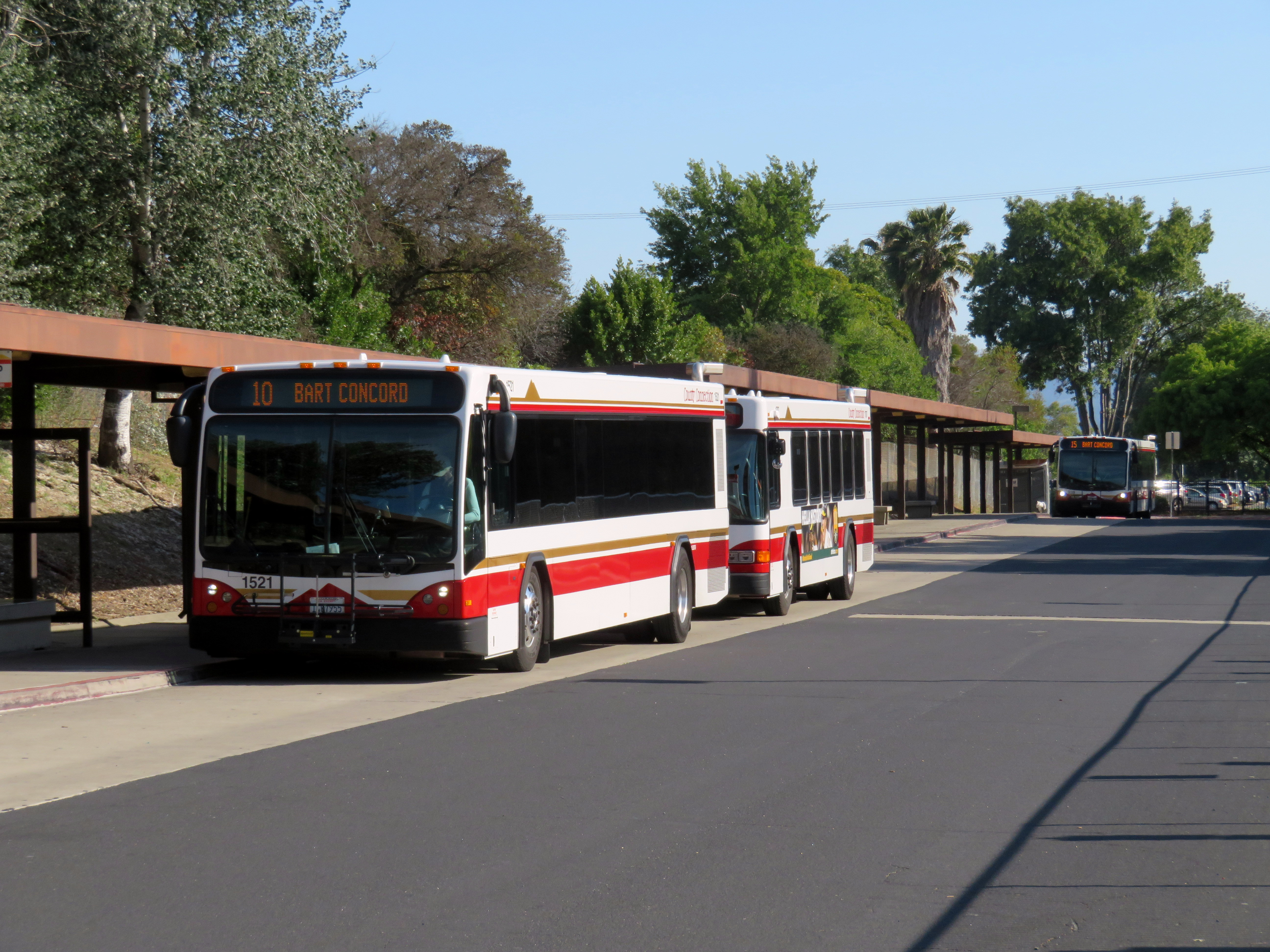
County Connection buses at the station

Concord is a major terminal for County Connection local bus routes:

- Weekday routes: 10, 11, 14, 15, 16, 17, 19, 20, 28, 91X, 260
- Weekend routes: 310, 311, 314, 315, 320

The station is also served by Tri Delta Transit route 201X and a special-event shuttle to the Concord Pavilion. Buses stop on the west side of the station; most routes stop at a two-lane busway north of the station entrance, while several routes stop to the south.
