= B. R. Stokes =

Mass transportation specialist and advocate (1924-2013)

Bill "Billy" Richard Stokes (February 20, 1924 – May 15, 2013) was a mass transportation specialist and advocate most famous for being the General Manager of the San Francisco Bay Area Rapid Transit (BART) District during the initial construction and start of service of BART.

== Early life and education ==
Stokes was born in 1924 to Robert A. and Ethel Stokes in Anadarko, Oklahoma. His father was a traveling salesman dealing mostly in insurance. The family moved to Oklahoma City when Bill was small then to Shawnee, Oklahoma where he attended school, graduating from Shawnee High School in 1941 and was senior class president. After serving as an ensign in the navy aboard a destroyer in the Pacific he attended the University of Oklahoma then the University of California, Berkeley.

== Career ==
=== Before BART ===
During World War II, he worked in the United States Navy on a destroyer. The destroyer he worked on was involved in the Japanese surrender at Sasebo, Japan.

From approximately 1946 to 1958, Stokes worked as the Urban Affairs writer for the Oakland Tribune, where he wrote articles about transit, city planning and urban affairs, some of which argued for a better mass transit solution for the San Francisco Bay Area.

=== Bay Area Rapid Transit ===
Stokes joined the Bay Area Rapid Transit District as its first employee, in the role of Director of Information. In that role, his primary responsibility was to develop and carry out a comprehensive information program about BART's rapid transit plan and its benefits for the Bay Area. His information campaign has been credited as a contributing factor to the BART construction and funding plan being approved by voters in the three-county Proposition A referendum on November 6, 1962.

In 1963, Stokes became General Manager of the BART District, an appointment that would generate controversy due to his lack of technical and engineering background. A disorganized and inexperienced Board of Directors led to Stokes having relatively free rein in his initial years of running BART, and he was supported by Adrien Falk, a San Francisco businessman and the first BART Board President. In particular, Falk's support helped Stokes thrive at his job despite the controversy over his lack of technical background.

In 1969, under the leadership of Stokes, BART was able to get the California state legislature to approve BART's request for an additional $150 million in funds, by levying a 0.5% sales tax in the BART counties.

BART began service on September 11, 1972, initially only serving the East Bay, while Stokes was still General Manager. A few weeks later (on October 18, 1972), Stokes accompanied United States President Richard Nixon and his wife Pat Nixon on a ride from San Leandro station to Lake Merritt Station.

Stokes came increasingly under fire for BART safety issues and financing problems. In February 1972, three engineers went public with safety concerns they had about BART's automatic train control (ATC) system that had been contracted out to Westinghouse Electric Corporation, after several months of raising the issues internally. In March, the three engineers were fired, with Stokes believed to have been the key decision-maker in the firing.

Subsequently, some of these concerns would prove well-founded as BART had a number of ATC-related accidents and near-accidents, leading to investigations by the California Public Utilities Commission, the National Transportation Safety Board, a separate blue ribbon panel, and others.

In May 1974, against a backdrop of low ridership, financial difficulties, and safety-related controversy, Stokes resigned from his position at BART after legislators made his departure a precondition for providing additional funding for BART.

=== Subsequent work in mass transit ===
After leaving BART, Stokes became executive director of the newly founded American Public Transportation Association (APTA) (initially known as the American Public Transit Association) headquartered in Washington, D.C. in 1974. This was at a time when many American cities were considering building mass transit systems similar to BART, and the National Mass Transportation Assistance Act, that would provide federal funding to cover part of the operating costs and construction costs of mass transit, was just becoming law (building on the Urban Mass Transportation Act of 1964 and Urban Mass Transportation Act of 1970). Under the leadership of Stokes, APTA pushed for cities to build out their mass transit systems and lobbied governments to provide funding for transit. In recognition of his work, APTA inducted Stokes in 1996 into its Hall of Fame.

After leaving APTA in 1980, Stokes worked for nine years at American Transportation Enterprises. He then became director general of Saudi Arabian Public Transport Co., where he opened bus service in seven cities in Saudi Arabia and intercity service for four more.

== Death ==
Stokes died on May 15, 2013, at his daughter's home in Sammamish, Washington, at the age of 89. The cause of death was reported as congestive heart failure. He was pre-deceased by his wife Joan (who died in 2011 in their home in Reston, Virginia) and survived by four children and six grandchildren.

== See also ==
- Richard A. White
- Thomas Margro
- Dorothy Dugger
- Grace Crunican
- Carole Ward Allen
