= Berkeley Hills Tunnel =

Rapid transit tunnel in California, US

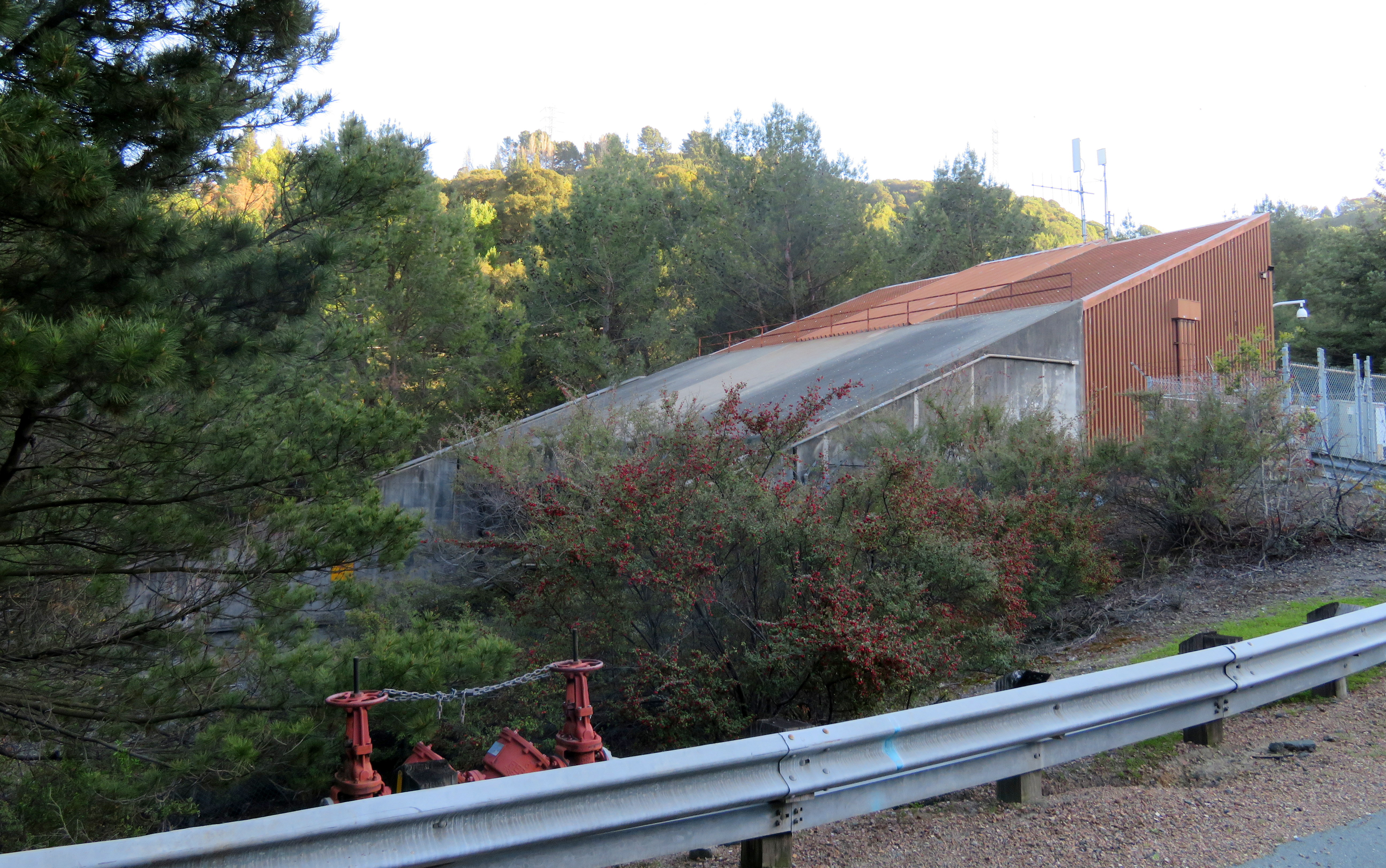
- East portal structure of the Berkeley Hills Tunnel
- Interactive map of Berkeley Hills Tunnel

Overview
- Other name: Caldecott BART Tunnel
- Line: Yellow Line
- Location: Alameda County, California
- Coordinates: Oakland portal: 37°51′05″N 122°14′17″W; Orinda portal: 37°52′29″N 122°11′16″W
- System: Bay Area Rapid Transit
- Crosses: Berkeley Hills, Hayward Fault
- Start: Rockridge Station, Oakland
- End: Orinda Station, Orinda
- No. of stations: None

Operation
- Work began: 1965
- Constructed: drill-and-blast
- Opened: May 21, 1973; 53 years ago
- Owner: San Francisco Bay Area Rapid Transit District
- Operator: San Francisco Bay Area Rapid Transit District
- Character: Rapid transit

Technical
- Line length: 3.1 mi (5.0 km)
- No. of tracks: 2
- Track gauge: 5 ft 6 in (1,676 mm) (Indian gauge)
- Electrified: Third rail, 1000 V DC
- Tunnel clearance: 16.8 feet (5.1 m)
- Grade: 1.2% (2% max)

The Berkeley Hills Tunnel is a tunnel which carries Bay Area Rapid Transit (BART) Yellow Line through the Berkeley Hills between Rockridge station and Orinda station.

== Design ==
While the tracks run in the median of California State Route 24 on both sides of the tunnel, the Berkeley Hills Tunnel allows the tracks to take a straighter alignment offset to the north of the Caldecott Tunnel.

The tunnel bores through the Berkeley Hills east of Berkeley and Oakland a distance of 3.1 miles (5.0 km) through a variety of rock strata, most of which are soft and porous. The earthquake-active Hayward Fault bisects the tunnel about 900 feet (270 m) inside the west portal (Oakland side). There are 2 bores, each 17.5 feet (5.3 m) in diameter, spaced 50 feet (15 m) apart. Pedestrian cross-tunnels are spaced every 1,000 feet (300 m) for emergency evacuation in case of fire, etc. There is a ventilation structure at the east portal with roll-down doors that can close off the tunnel end to allow air to be sucked out or blown in.

By 2017, cumulative minor damage from fault creep had significantly reduced the tunnel's cross section, to the point where BART determined it was necessary to plan for repair and mitigation against future creep. The work, which includes excavating the tunnel walls and realigning the tracks, is expected to cost $60 million.

== Construction ==
Construction of the tunnel began in early February, 1965. The bores were holed through by March, 1967, and construction completed in July, 1968. The tunnel was opened for revenue service on May 21, 1973, with the Concord line.

Material removed in the construction of the tunnel was used as fill for a concurrent expansion of the Port of Oakland.

== Incidents ==
On December 4, 2013, a BART train suffered mechanical braking problems and made an emergency stop in the tunnel near Rockridge station. Eleven people were treated for smoke inhalation.

== See also ==
- List of tunnels in the United States
