= Thomas Margro =

Mass transportation executive and manager

Thomas E. Margro

General Manager of the Bay Area Rapid Transit system
- In office September 30, 1996 – June 29, 2007
- Preceded by: Richard A. White (1994 – 1996)
- Succeeded by: Dorothy Dugger (2007 – 2011)

CEO of Transportation Corridor Agencies
- In office 2007–2012
- Succeeded by: Neil Peterson

Thomas E. "Tom" Margro is a mass transportation executive, and general manager for the San Francisco Bay Area Rapid Transit district from 1996 to 2007. He was CEO of the Transportation Corridor Agencies from 2007 to 2012.

== Early life and education ==
Margro graduated from Syracuse University with a bachelor's degree in electrical engineering, and a master's degree from the University of Pennsylvania in systems engineering, with additional post graduate studies in systems engineering.

== Career ==
After graduating college, Margro worked as a rocket scientist for a year, working as a defense contractor on the Minuteman missile guidance system.

In 1972, Margro joined SEPTA in Philadelphia as the only electrical engineer in a team tasked with maintaining an aging and ill-maintained transit system acquired from a private company. He worked at SEPTA for 18 years (till 1990); his roles there included manager of facilities engineering; senior program manager, electrical facilities; chief engineer; and ultimately assistant general manager of engineering and construction.

Margro worked at BART from 1990 to 1995 as assistant general manager of transit system development. In that position, he was responsible for the BART Extensions Program, including the Pittsburg/Bay Point extension (the North Concord/Martinez station and Pittsburg/Bay Point station) and the Dublin/Pleasanton extensions (the Castro Valley station and Dublin/Pleasanton station). The stations would open between 1995 and 1997.

Margro worked for a year (between 1995 and 1996) at the New Jersey Turnpike Authority as Director of Maintenance and Engineering Services/Chief Engineer.

On June 1, 1996, it was announced that BART general manager Richard A. White was leaving BART to become general manager of the Washington Metropolitan Area Transit Authority, with July 26 being his last day at BART. Potential successor candidates mentioned at the time of his departure were Deputy General Manager Dorothy Dugger (who would become general manager in 2007), Jim Gallagher (assistant general manager of operations), Larry Williams (assistant general manager of operations), and John Haley (former deputy general manager at BART, at the time deputy general manager of the port authority in New York).

On September 30, 1996, Margro became the general manager of BART, succeeding White. According to BART board member Tom Radulovich who joined the board at about the same time, there was a general feeling at the time that the BART SFO extension (extending BART to the San Francisco International Airport station and Millbrae Intermodal Terminal) was lagging behind, and part of the expectation from Margro was that he would complete the extension. Under Margro, BART successfully opened the extension in 2003.

Margro was also at the helm when Measure AA, a proposal to fund BART's Earthquake Safety Program with $980 million from property taxes, was approved by voters in a referendum, and he oversaw the initial implementation of the program.

On April 10, 2007, BART announced that Margro was retiring, with June 29, 2007 being his last day. Margro would be BART's longest-serving general manager. Board members Radulovich and Lynette Sweet praised his accomplishments, including getting the SFO extension completed, launching the Earthquake Safety Program, and working out a solution with unions representing BART employees to avert financial crisis. Also, it was during Margro's tenure that BART received the American Public Transportation Association's Outstanding Public Transportation System honor in 2004. The praise was echoed by Dan Richard, a former BART board member.

On August 23, 2007, Dorothy Dugger, the former deputy general manager, who had been filling the role of interim general manager, became Margro's successor as general manager.

Margro was CEO of Transportation Corridor Agencies (TCA) from 2007 (starting a little after his retirement from BART) to 2012. TCA operates toll roads in Orange County, California. After a nationwide search for a replacement, TCA hired Neil Peterson as the new CEO, with a start date of June 3, 2013.
