= Bay Area Rapid Transit =

Rapid transit system serving the San Francisco Bay Area

Bay Area Rapid Transit (BART)

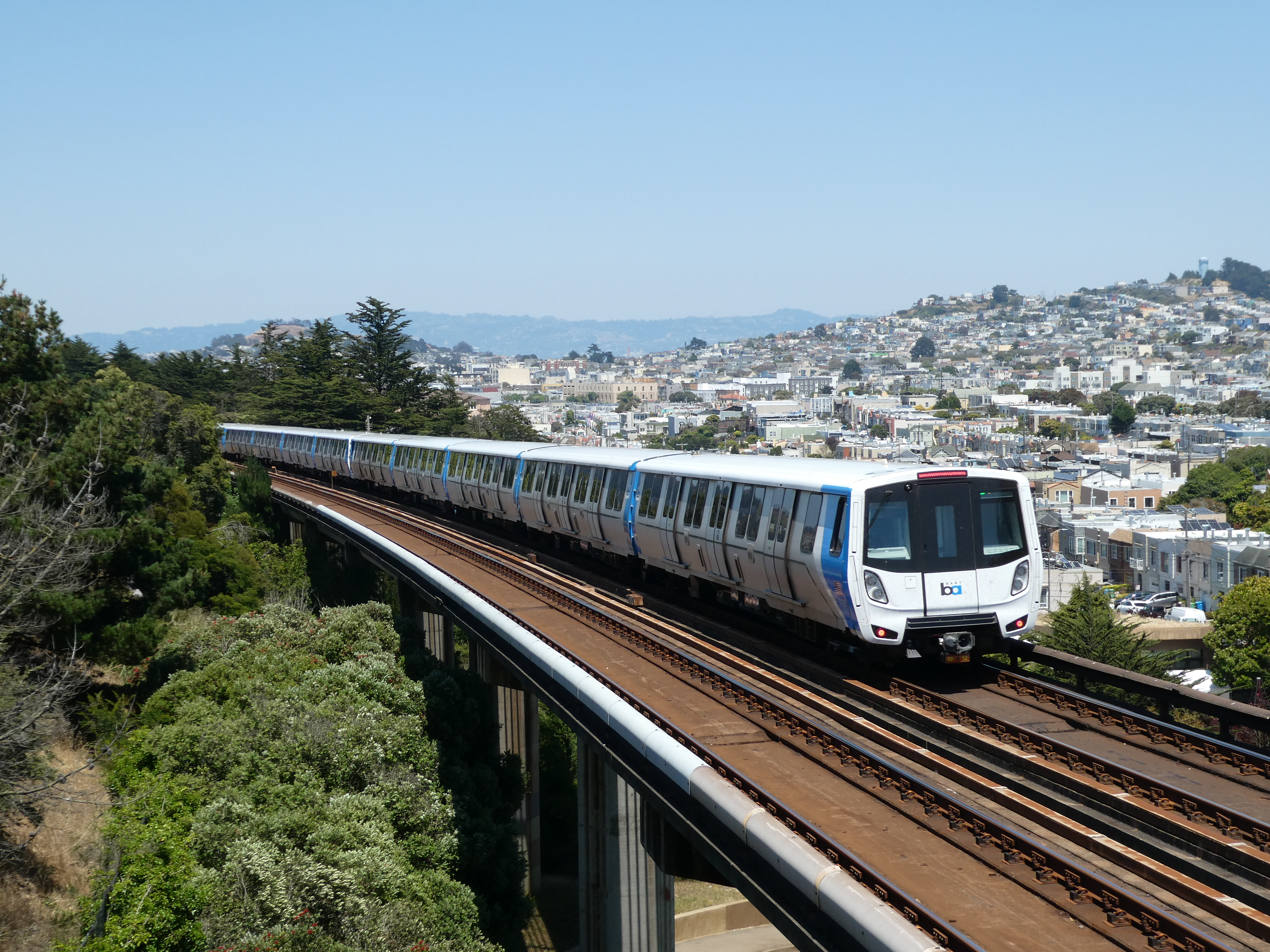
- BART train in southern San Francisco

Overview
- Locale: San Francisco Bay Area (Alameda, Contra Costa, San Francisco, San Mateo, and Santa Clara counties)
- Transit type: Rapid transit (main system); Hybrid rail (eBART); AGT (Oakland Airport Connector)
- Number of lines: 5 rapid transit lines (1 with diesel light rail extension); 1 AGT line
- Number of stations: 50 (7 planned/proposed)
- Daily ridership: 204,800 (weekdays, Q2 2026)
- Annual ridership: 55,483,900 (2025)
- Chief executive: Robert Powers
- Headquarters: 2150 Webster Street; Oakland, California
- Website: bart.gov

Operation
- Began operation: September 11, 1972
- Operator: San Francisco Bay Area Rapid Transit District
- Character: Fully grade separated with at-grade, elevated and underground sections
- Number of vehicles: 805 total, with 700+ available for service; with 8 DMU vehicle sets (eBART); and 4 AGT vehicle sets
- Train length: 5–10 cars; 2-car married pair (DMUs); 3 cars (AGT)
- Headway: 10 minutes (Yellow Line), 20 minutes (other lines)

Technical
- System length: 131.4 mi (211.5 km)
- Track gauge: Main system: 5 ft 6 in (1,676 mm); eBART: 4 ft 8 1/2 in (1,435 mm)
- Minimum radius of curvature: 120 m (394 ft)
- Electrification: Third rail, 1 kV DC
- Average speed: 35 mph (56 km/h)
- Top speed: 80 mph (130 km/h) (maximum); 70 mph (110 km/h) (typical)
System map
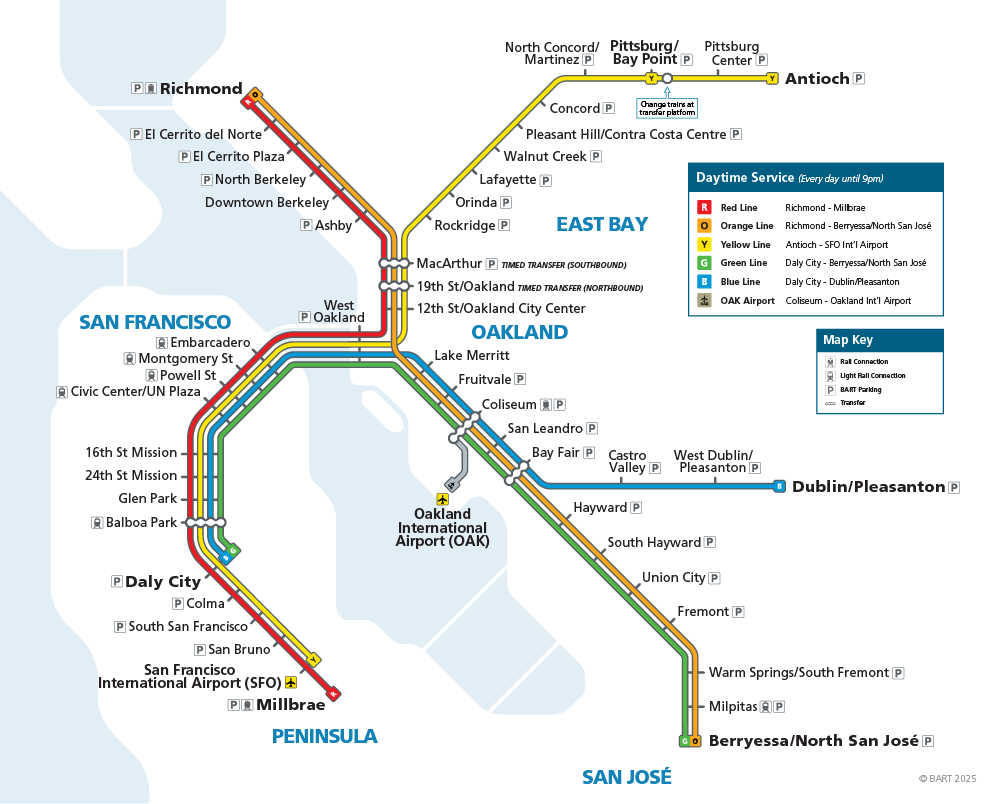

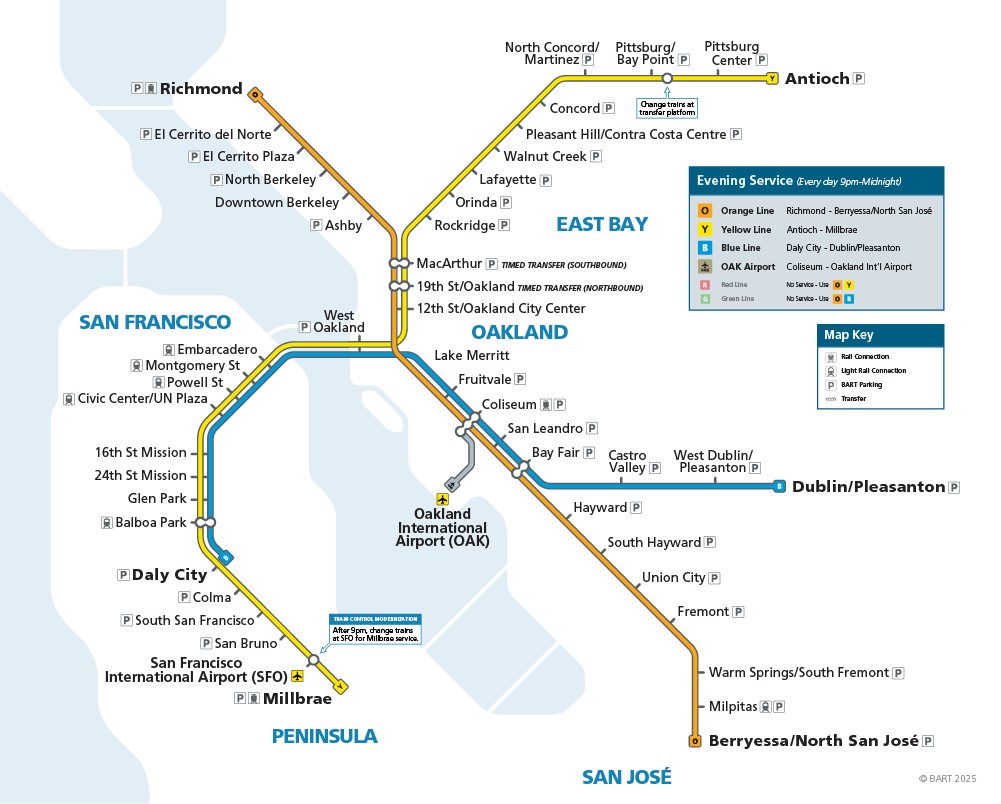
Key

Bay Area Rapid Transit (BART) is a rapid transit system serving the San Francisco Bay Area in California. BART serves 50 stations along six routes and 131 miles (211 kilometers) of track, including eBART, a 9-mile (14 km) spur line running to Antioch, and Oakland Airport Connector, a 3-mile (4.8 km) automated guideway transit line serving Oakland San Francisco Bay Airport. With an average of 204,800 weekday passenger trips as of the second quarter of 2026 and 55,483,900 annual passenger trips in 2025, BART is the seventh-busiest rapid transit system in the United States.

Headquartered in Oakland, BART is operated by the San Francisco Bay Area Rapid Transit District which formed in 1957. The initial system opened in stages from 1972 to 1974. The system has been extended several times, most recently in 2020, when Milpitas and Berryessa/North San José stations opened as part of the under construction Silicon Valley BART extension in partnership with the Santa Clara Valley Transportation Authority (VTA).

== Services ==
BART serves large portions of its three member counties – San Francisco, Alameda, and Contra Costa – as well as smaller portions of San Mateo County and Santa Clara counties. The system has 50 stations: 22 in Alameda County, 12 in Contra Costa County, 8 in San Francisco, 6 in San Mateo County, and 2 in Santa Clara County. BART operates five named heavy rail services plus one separate automated guideway line. All of the heavy rail services run through Oakland, and all but the Orange Line cross the bay through the Transbay Tube to San Francisco. All five services run every day until 9 pm; only three services operate evenings after 9 pm. All stations are served during all service hours. The eastern segment of the Yellow Line (between Antioch and the transfer platform east of Pittsburg/Bay Point) uses different rolling stock and is separated from the rest of the line.

Route name	First service	Length (mi)	Termini		Lines used	Notes
Orange Line	1972	51	Berryessa/ North San José	Richmond	R, K, A, S	Operates during all service hours.
Yellow Line	1973	62.2	SFO (until 9pm)	Antioch	C, K, M, W, Y, E	Operates during all service hours. Uses DMU vehicles (eBART) between Antioch and Pittsburg/Bay Point.
Yellow Line	1973	62.2	Millbrae (after 9pm)	Antioch	C, K, M, W, Y, E	Operates during all service hours. Uses DMU vehicles (eBART) between Antioch and Pittsburg/Bay Point.
Green Line	1974	53	Daly City	Berryessa/ North San José	S, A, M	No evening (after 9 pm) service.
Red Line	1976	38.2	Millbrae	Richmond	R, K, M, W, Y	No evening (after 9 pm) service.
Blue Line	1997	35.7	Daly City	Dublin/ Pleasanton	L, A, M	Operates during all service hours.
Oakland Airport Connector	2014	3.2	OAK	Coliseum	H	Operates during all service hours. Uses AGT vehicles.

=== Hours and frequencies ===
BART's network topology, which mixes densely-packed urban stations served at high frequencies by multiple interlined services along a central trunk (West Oakland to Daly City, served by all lines but the Orange) with branching suburban lines with widely-spaced stations and lower frequencies, is similar to European S-Bahn systems. Trains on each primary service run every 20 minutes, except the busy Yellow Line, which operates every 10 minutes on weekdays. However, many stations are served by multiple lines; the trunk between West Oakland and Daly City receives 15 trains per hour (average four-minute headways) in peak hours. The Oakland Airport Connector runs "on demand", typically on headways of 10 minutes or less.

Timed cross-platform transfers are available between the Orange Line, which runs north-south through the East Bay, and the Yellow Line, which operates through the Transbay Tube to serve the San Francisco Peninsula. This service complements the Red Line during daytime hours and replaces that line when it stops operating after 9:00 p.m.

The first inbound trains leave outer terminals around 5:00 am on weekdays, 6:00 am on Saturdays, and 8:00 am on Sundays and most holidays. The last trains of the service day leave their terminals around midnight; the final Yellow and Orange Line trains in both directions meet at MacArthur station, and the final Orange and Blue Line trains in the southbound direction meet at Bay Fair station, for guaranteed transfers.

=== Bus services ===
Two different bus networks are operated by regional transit agencies as a rail replacement bus service when BART is not operating due to regularly scheduled maintenance during the overnight hours.

The All Nighter network provides basic bus service to San Francisco, the East Bay, and Peninsula, replicating rail transit services in those regions, including BART, Caltrain, and Muni Metro. All Nighter buses serve most BART stations (directly or within several blocks), replicating 3-Line late night BART service with abbreviated routes:

- Buses replicating Yellow Line service terminate at Rockridge (stations east of Rockridge to the regular terminus at Antioch are not served)
- Buses replicating Blue Line service terminate at Bay Fair (stations east to Dublin/Pleasanton are not served)
- Buses replicating Orange Line service terminate at Fremont (stations south to Berryessa/North San José are not served)

The All Nighter-branded bus service started in 2006, although late night bus service had been provided as an alternative to BART prior to then.

The Early Bird Express network is another bus alternative which provides service to major BART stations in the early morning between 3:50 am and 5:30 am. Early Bird Express buses are operated by local transit agencies, including AC Transit, Golden Gate Transit, Muni, and SamTrans, running between a limited number of major BART stations on San Francisco/Peninsula and Transbay routes which all meet at the Salesforce Transit Center. Early Bird Express routes are identified by three-digit route numbers starting with 7xx. As of August 2024, there are six Early Bird Express routes, replicating 3-Line service:

- Yellow Line bus substitute operating to and from Millbrae (Peninsula)
- Blue Line bus operating to and from Daly City (San Francisco)
- Yellow Line buses operating from Pittsburg/Bay Point and Pleasant Hill (Transbay)
- Blue Line bus operating from Dublin/Pleasanton (Transbay)
- Orange Line bus operating from El Cerrito del Norte (Transbay)

The original Early Bird Express network was introduced in February 2019 when the start of rail service was shifted from 4 a.m. to 5 a.m. to accommodate seismic upgrades in the Transbay Tube; at its debut, it featured fifteen routes, but some were eliminated later that year due to low ridership. Additional routes were eliminated in 2024, including an inbound bus from Fremont replicating Orange Line service.

Historically, BART operated BART Express bus service between 1974 and 1997, extending transit coverage to central and eastern Alameda and Contra Costa counties; these routes were discontinued following the completion of rail line extensions starting in the late 1990s. BART Express was operated for BART under contracts to AC Transit (1974–1989) and Laidlaw (1989–1997). Since then, some services similar to the legacy BART Express routes which were not replaced by rail service have been taken over by local bus operators, including WestCAT and Tri Delta Transit.

To accommodate those with conditions and disabilities that prevent from boarding a train, BART has entered a joint venture with AC Transit to establish East Bay Paratransit to provide paratransit bus services.

=== Connecting services ===
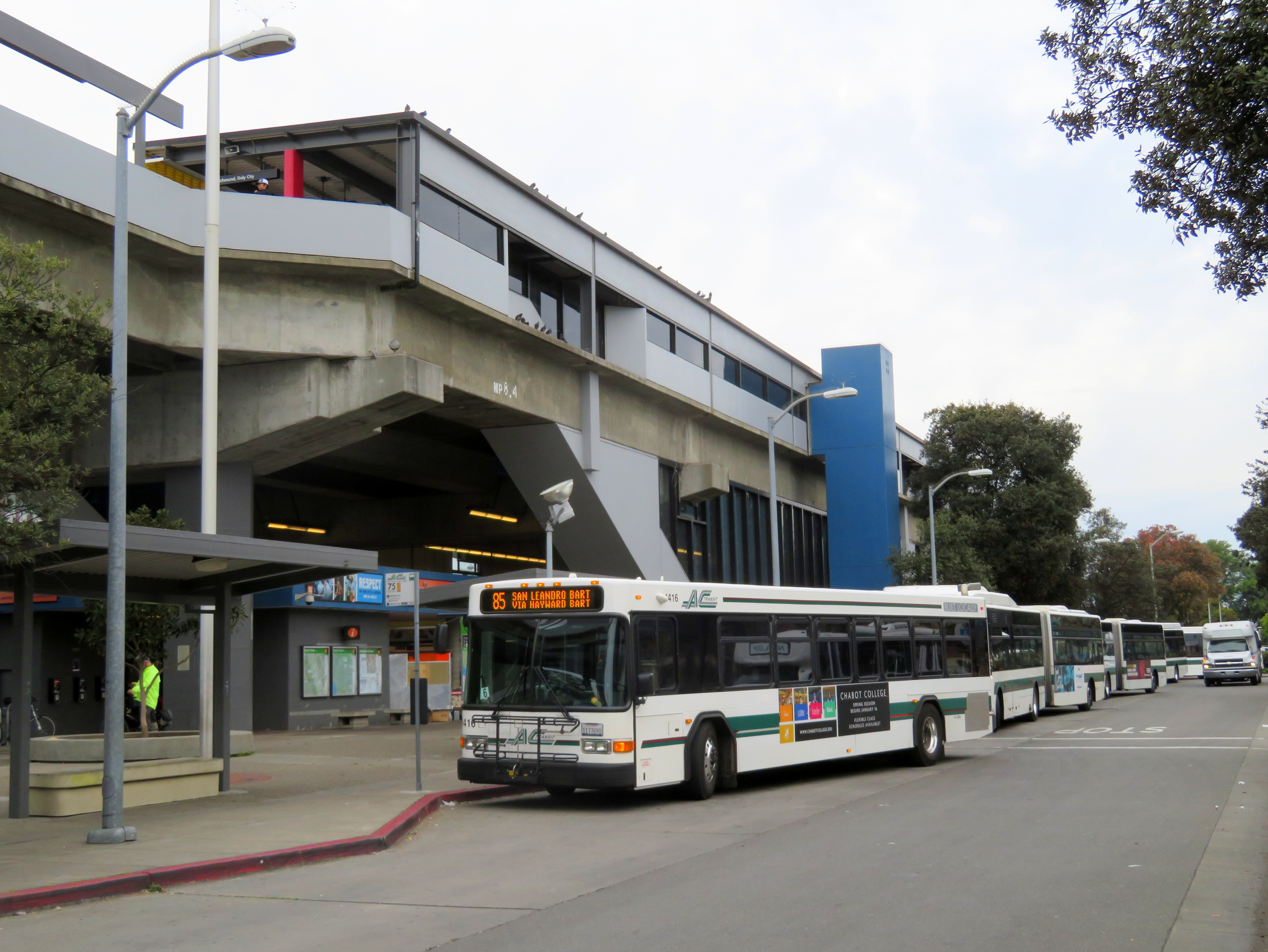
AC Transit buses at San Leandro station

Intermodal connections to local, regional, and intercity transit – including bus, light rail, commuter rail, and intercity rail – are available across the BART system. Three Amtrak intercity rail services – the California Zephyr, Capitol Corridor, and Gold Runner – stop at Richmond station; the Capitol Corridor also stops at Oakland Coliseum station. Transfer between BART and the Caltrain commuter rail service is available at Millbrae station.

BART and most lines of San Francisco's Muni Metro light rail system share four stations (Embarcadero, Montgomery Street, Powell Street, and Civic Center/UN Plaza) in the Market Street subway; connections are also available to three lines at Balboa Park station and one line at Glen Park station. A tunnel at the Powell Street station connects to the Union Square/Market Street station on the Muni Metro T Third Street line. In the South Bay, Milpitas station provides a connection to the Orange Line of VTA light rail.

BART is served by bus connections from regional and local transit agencies at all stations, most of which have dedicated off-street bus transfer areas. Many connecting routes (particularly in suburban areas) serve primarily as feeder routes to BART. Larger bus systems connecting to BART include Muni in San Francisco, AC Transit in the East Bay, SamTrans in San Mateo County, County Connection and Tri Delta Transit in eastern Contra Costa County, WestCAT in western Contra Costa County, WHEELS in the Tri-Valley, VTA in the Santa Clara Valley, and Golden Gate Transit. Smaller systems include Emery Go-Round in Emeryville, Commute.org on the Peninsula, San Leandro LINKS, Dumbarton Express, and Union City Transit. The Salesforce Transit Center regional bus hub is located one block from Embarcadero and Montgomery stations.

Several transit agencies offer limited commuter-oriented bus service from more distant cities to outlying BART stations; these include VINE from Napa County, Solano Express from Solano County, Rio Vista Delta Breeze, Stanislaus Regional Transit Authority from Stanislaus County, and San Joaquin RTD from Stockton. Many BART stations are also served by privately run employer and hospital shuttles, and privately run intercity buses stop at several stations.

=== Airport connections ===
BART also runs directly to two of the three major Bay Area airports (San Francisco International Airport and Oakland San Francisco Bay Airport) with service to San Jose International Airport provided by a VTA bus route available at Milpitas station.

== History ==
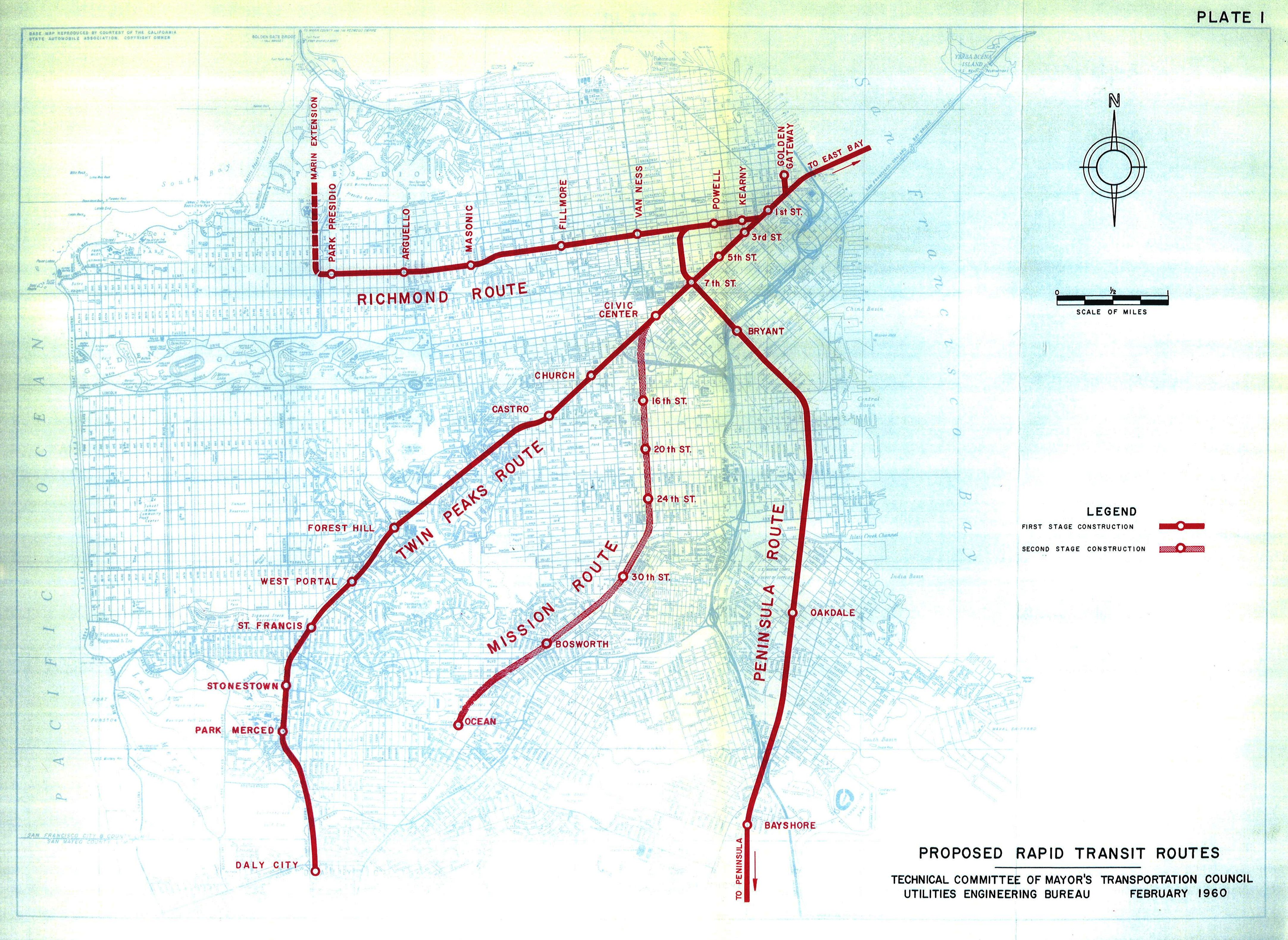
Envisioned master plan for rapid transit in San Francisco. BART was intended to take over existing rail corridors as well as incorporate new routes into the regional system. This map from 1960 included service through the Caltrain right of way as well as the Twin Peaks Tunnel, currently used for Muni Metro service, in addition to a Geary Subway and the constructed route down Mission Street (truncated to Balboa Park in this plan).

=== Origins, planning, and geographical coverage ===
Some of the Bay Area Rapid Transit system's current coverage area was once served by an electrified streetcar and suburban train system called the Key System, and interurban trains by the Sacramento Northern Railway. These early 20th-century systems once had regular transbay traffic across the lower deck of the Bay Bridge, with Sacramento Northern travelling on the bridge using Key System tracks. The Key System served communities close to the San Francisco Bay. The Sacramento Northern, went through the hills in Contra Costa County connecting several towns there, then north into the Central Valley.

Sacramento Northern passenger service which at its height went from San Francisco to Chico (north of Sacramento) ended in the early 1940s. The Key System was dismantled in the 1950s, with its last transbay crossing in 1958, and was superseded by highway travel. A 1950s study of traffic problems in the Bay Area concluded the most cost-effective solution for the Bay Area's traffic woes would be to form a transit district charged with the construction and operation of a new, high-speed rapid transit system linking the cities and suburbs. Marvin E. Lewis, a San Francisco trial attorney and member of the city's board of supervisors, spearheaded a grassroots movement to advance the idea of an alternative bay crossing and the possibility of regional transit network.

Formal planning for BART began with the setting up in 1957 of the San Francisco Bay Area Rapid Transit District, a county-based special-purpose district body that governs the BART system. The district initially began with five members, all of which were projected to receive BART lines: Alameda County, Contra Costa County, the City and County of San Francisco, San Mateo County, and Marin County. Although invited to participate, Santa Clara County supervisors elected not to join BART due to their dissatisfaction that the peninsula line only stopped at Palo Alto initially, and that it interfered with suburban development in San Jose, preferring instead to concentrate on constructing freeways and expressways. Though the system expanded into Santa Clara County in 2020, as of June 2024 it is still not a district member.

In 1962, San Mateo County supervisors voted to leave BART, saying their voters would be paying taxes to carry mainly Santa Clara County residents (presumably along I-280, SR 92, and SR 85). The district-wide tax base was weakened by San Mateo's departure, which led the BART board to pressure Marin County into withdrawing a few months later. Despite the fact that Marin had originally voted in favor of BART participation at the 88% level, the BART board was concerned that the county's marginal tax base could not adequately absorb its share of BART's projected cost. Another important factor in Marin's withdrawal was an engineering controversy over the feasibility of running trains on the lower deck of the Golden Gate Bridge, an extension forecast as late as three decades after the rest of the BART system. The withdrawals of Marin and San Mateo resulted in a downsizing of the original system plans, which would have had lines as far south as Palo Alto and northward past San Rafael. Voters in the three remaining participating counties approved the truncated system, with terminals in Fremont, Richmond, Concord, and Daly City, in 1962.

Construction of the system began in 1964, and included a number of major engineering challenges, including excavating subway tunnels in San Francisco, Oakland, and Berkeley; constructing aerial structures throughout the Bay Area, particularly in Alameda and Contra Costa counties; tunneling through the Berkeley Hills on the Concord line; and lowering the system's centerpiece, the Transbay Tube connecting Oakland and San Francisco, into a trench dredged onto the floor of San Francisco Bay. Like other transit systems of the same era, BART endeavored to connect outlying suburbs with job centers in Oakland and San Francisco by building lines that paralleled established commuting routes of the region's freeway system. BART envisioned frequent local service, with headways as short as two minutes between trains through the Transbay Tube and six minutes on each individual line.

=== Early years and train control problems ===
Passenger service began on September 11, 1972, initially just between MacArthur and Fremont. The rest of the system opened in stages, with the entire system opening in 1974 when the transbay service through the Transbay Tube began. The new BART system was hailed as a major step forward in subway technology, although questions were asked concerning the safety of the system and the huge expenditures necessary for the construction of the network. Ridership remained well below projected levels throughout the 1970s, and direct service from Daly City to Richmond and Fremont was not phased in until several years after the system opened.

Some of the early safety concerns appeared to be well founded when the system experienced a number of train-control failures in its first few years of operation. As early as 1969, before revenue service began, several BART engineers identified safety problems with the Automatic Train Control (ATC) system. The BART Board of Directors was dismissive of their concerns and retaliated by firing them. Less than a month after the system's opening, on October 2, 1972, an ATC failure caused a train to run off the end of the elevated track at the terminal Fremont station and crash to the ground, injuring four people. The "Fremont Flyer" led to a comprehensive redesign of the train controls and also resulted in multiple investigations being opened by the California State Senate, California Public Utilities Commission, and National Transportation Safety Board. Hearings by the state legislature in 1974 into financial mismanagement at BART forced the General Manager to resign in May 1974, and the entire Board of Directors was replaced the same year when the legislature passed legislation leading to the election of a new Board and the end of appointed members.

=== Extensions ===
Even before the BART system opened, planners projected several possible extensions. Although Marin County was left out of the original system, the 1970 Golden Gate Transportation Facilities Plan considered a tunnel under the Golden Gate or second deck on the bridge, but neither of these plans was pursued. Over twenty years would pass before the first extensions to the BART system were completed to North Concord/Martinez in 1995, Colma and Pittsburg/Bay Point in 1996. An extension to Dublin/Pleasanton in 1997 added a fifth line to the system for the first time in BART's history. The system was expanded to San Francisco International Airport in 2003 and to Oakland International Airport via an automated guideway transit spur line in 2014. eBART, an extension using diesel multiple units along conventional railroad infrastructure between Pittsburg/Bay Point and Antioch on the Yellow Line, opened on May 26, 2018. BART's most significant current extension project is the Silicon Valley BART extension on the Green and Orange Lines. The first phase extended the Fremont line to Warm Springs/South Fremont in early 2017, and the second phase to Berryessa/North San José began service on June 13, 2020. The third phase to Santa Clara is contingent upon the allocation of funding as of May 2020, but is planned to be completed by 2036.

Plans had long been floated for an extension from Dublin to Livermore, but the most recent proposal was rejected by the BART board in 2018. Other plans have included an extension to Hercules, a line along the Interstate Highway 680 corridor, and a fourth set of rail tracks through Oakland. At least four infill stations such as Irvington and Calaveras on existing lines have been proposed. With the Transbay Tube nearing capacity, long-range plans included a new four-bore Transbay Tube beneath San Francisco Bay that would run parallel and south of the existing tunnel and emerge at The Portal, part of Salesforce Transit Center to connect to Caltrain and the future California High-Speed Rail system. The four-bore tunnel would provide two tunnels for BART and two tunnels for conventional/high-speed rail. The BART system and conventional U.S. rail use different and incompatible rail gauges and different loading gauges. In 2018, BART announced that a feasibility study for installing a second transbay crossing would commence the following year. By 2019, the Capitol Corridor Joint Powers Authority (CCJPA) had joined with BART to study a multi-modal crossing, which could also allow Capitol Corridor and San Joaquins routes to serve San Francisco directly.

=== System modernization ===
In 2007, BART stated its intention to improve non-peak (night and weekend) headways for each line to 15 minutes. The 20-minute headways at these times is a barrier to ridership. In mid-2007, BART temporarily reversed its position, stating that the shortened wait times would likely not happen due to a $900,000 state revenue budget shortfall. Nevertheless, BART eventually confirmed the implementation of the plan by January 2008. Continued budgetary problems halted the expanded non-peak service and returned off-peak headways to 20 minutes in 2009.

In 2008, BART announced that it would install solar panels at two yards, maintenance facilities, and Orinda station (the only station that receives sufficient sunlight to justify installation cost).

In 2012, the California Transportation Commission announced that they would provide funding for expanding BART facilities, through the Santa Clara Valley Transportation Authority, in anticipation of the opening of the Silicon Valley Berryessa Extension. $50 million would go in part to improvements to the Hayward Maintenance Complex.

In March 2019, BART announced that they would begin updating ticket add-fare machines inside the paid area to accept debit and credit cards for payment (for Clipper cards only). In December 2020, BART completed the changeover to Clipper and stopped issuing magstripe paper tickets. Existing paper tickets remained valid. In April 2021, BART began accepting Clipper cards on Apple Pay, Google Pay, and the Clipper app at all BART stations. By December 2023, the fare system was entirely Clipper-only. Beginning August 20, 2025, riders no longer need a Clipper card, and can pay using physical contactless credit or debit cards, or mobile payment methods, such as Apple Pay and Google Pay.

During the 1989 Loma Prieta earthquake, the BART equipment was mostly undamaged. A 2010 study concluded that along with some Bay Area freeways, some of BART's overhead structures could collapse in a major earthquake, which has a significant probability of occurring within three decades. Seismic retrofitting has been carried out since 2004 upon voter approval to address these deficiencies, especially in the Transbay Tube. BART projects that Transbay Tube retrofits were completed by 2024.

== Rolling stock ==
=== Car types ===
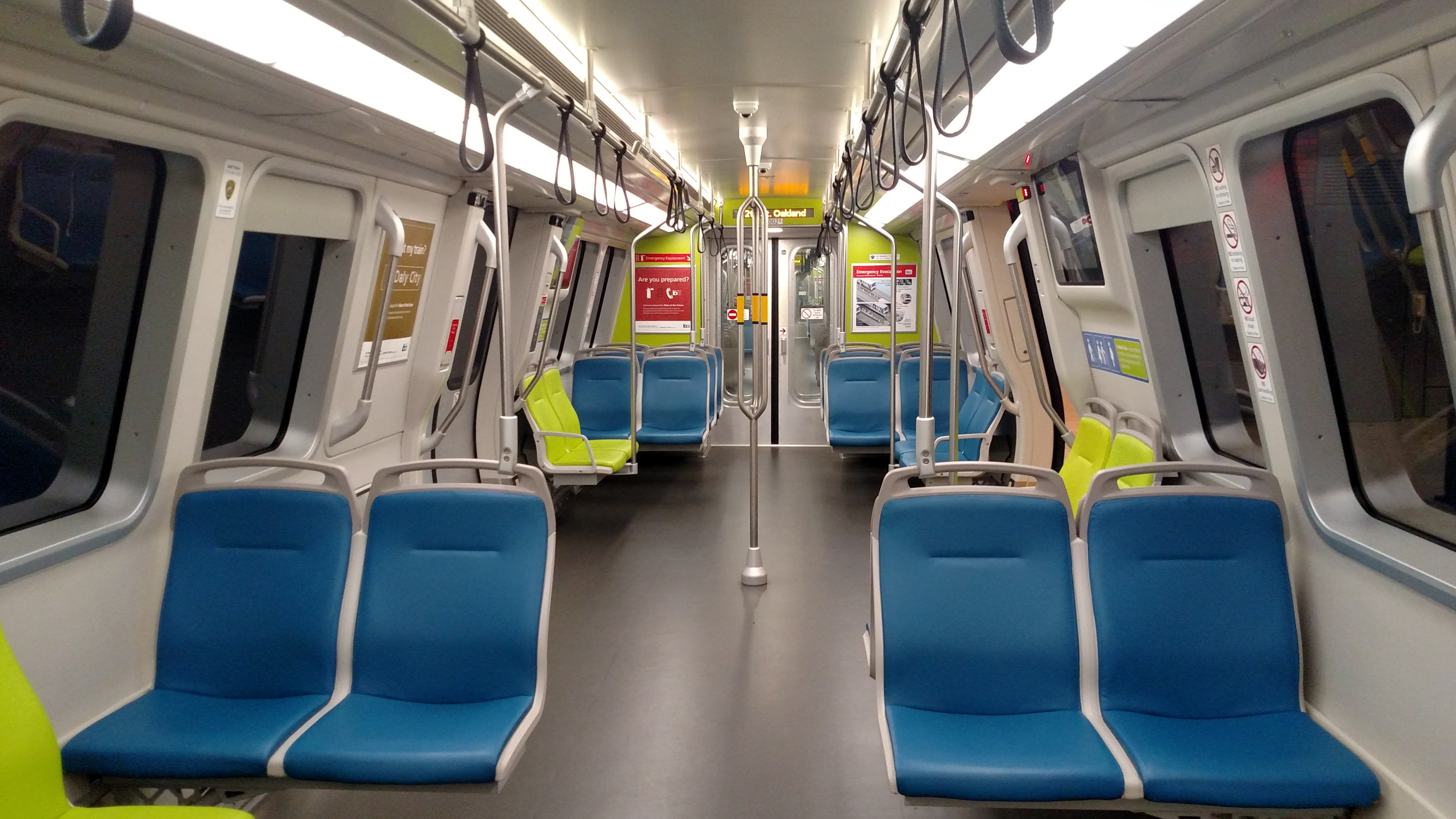
Interior of a new BART car

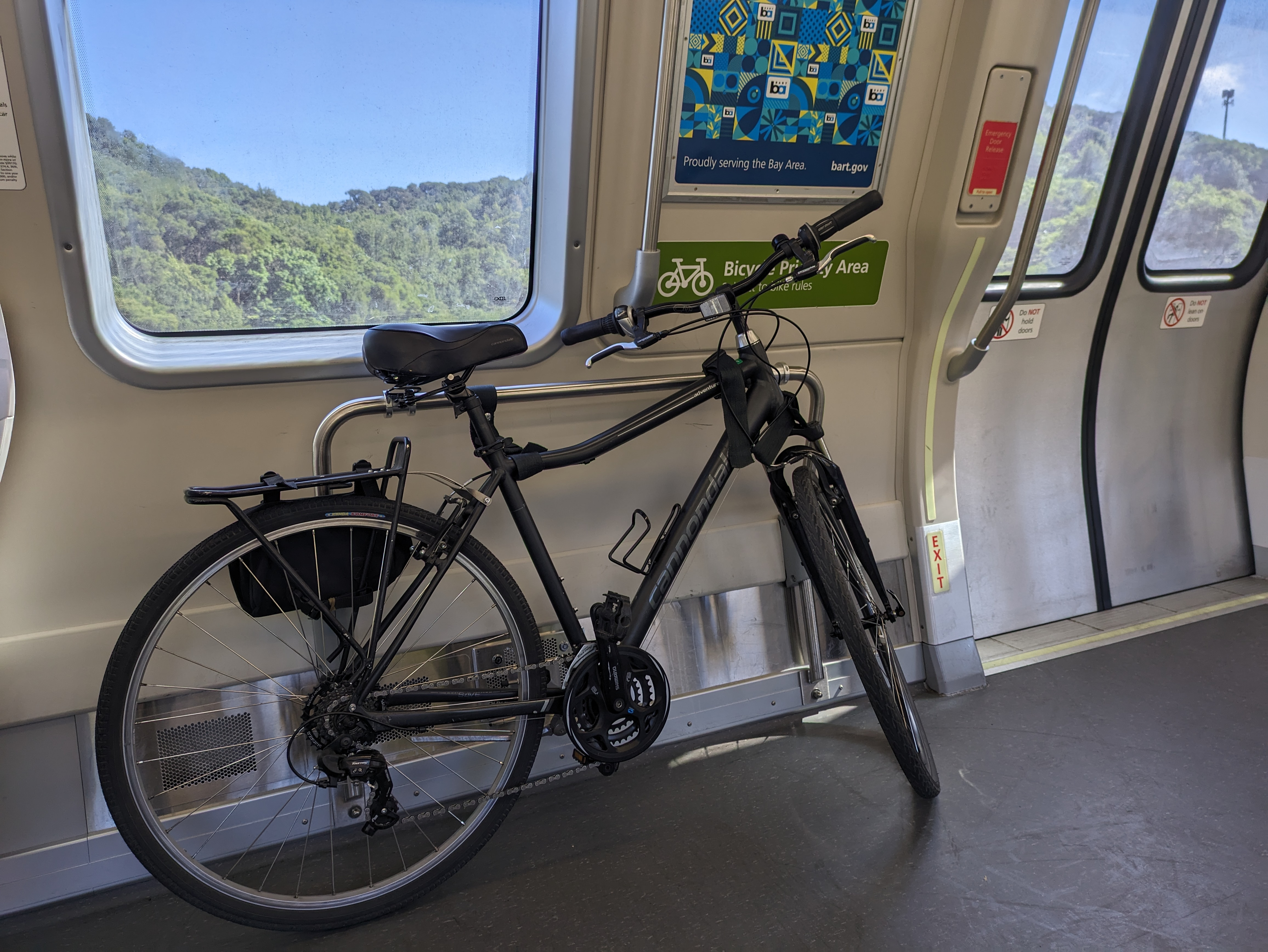
A bicycle secured to a BART bike rack

The mainline BART network operates with electric powered, self-propelled railcars. BART trains have gangway connections, and passengers can move freely between cars. The cars have three doors on each side, bike racks, 54 seats per car, and interior and exterior displays giving information. As of August 2026, mainline trains vary in length from five to ten cars. Yellow Line trains are nine to ten cars long; Red Line trains are ten cars at peak hours and five cars at other times; Orange Line trains are five to six cars; Green and Blue line trains are eight cars at peak hours and six cars at other times.

The current cars, branded by BART as its "Fleet of the Future", entered service on January 19, 2018. A total of 775 cars were ordered from Bombardier (which merged with Alstom during production): 310 cab cars (D-cars) and 465 non-cab cars (E-cars). The previous BART fleet, consisting of A, B, and C cars, was built between 1968 and 1996. It was retired from regular service on September 11, 2023, with the final revenue runs on April 20, 2024.

The Oakland Airport Connector uses a completely separate and independently operated fleet of cable car-based automated guideway transit vehicles. It uses four Cable Liner trains built by DCC Doppelmayr Cable Car, arranged as three-car sets, but the system can accommodate four-car trains in the future.

The eBART extension uses eight Stadler GTW diesel railcars. The Stadler GTW vehicles are diesel multiple units, which operate over standard gauge tracks (as opposed to BART's broad gauge).

Current fleet
Lines	Manufacturer	Class	Image	Car numbers	Qty.	Built
Main system	Bombardier/ Alstom (Note: Bombardier merged with Alstom during production.)	D		3001–3310	310	2012–2024
Main system	Bombardier/ Alstom	E		4001–4465	465	2012–2024
Oakland Airport Connector	Doppelmayr	Cable Liner		1.3–4.3	4 sets	2014
eBART	Stadler	GTW		101–108	8	2016

Retired fleet
Lines	Manufacturer	Class	Image	Car numbers	Qty.	Built	Retired
Main system	Rohr	A		1164–1276	59	1968–1975	April 20, 2024
Main system	Rohr	B		1501–1913	380	1971–1975	April 20, 2024
Main system	Alstom	C1		301–450	150	1987–1990	May 15, 2023
Main system	Morrison–Knudsen	C2		2501–2580	80	1994–1996	August 2021

=== Depots ===
The initial BART system included car storage and maintenance yards in Concord, Hayward, and Richmond, with an additional maintenance only (no car storage) yard in Oakland. The Daly City car storage and maintenance yard opened in December 1988. The Oakland Airport Connector uses the Doolittle Maintenance and Storage Facility. eBART vehicles use a facility in Antioch.

== Fares ==
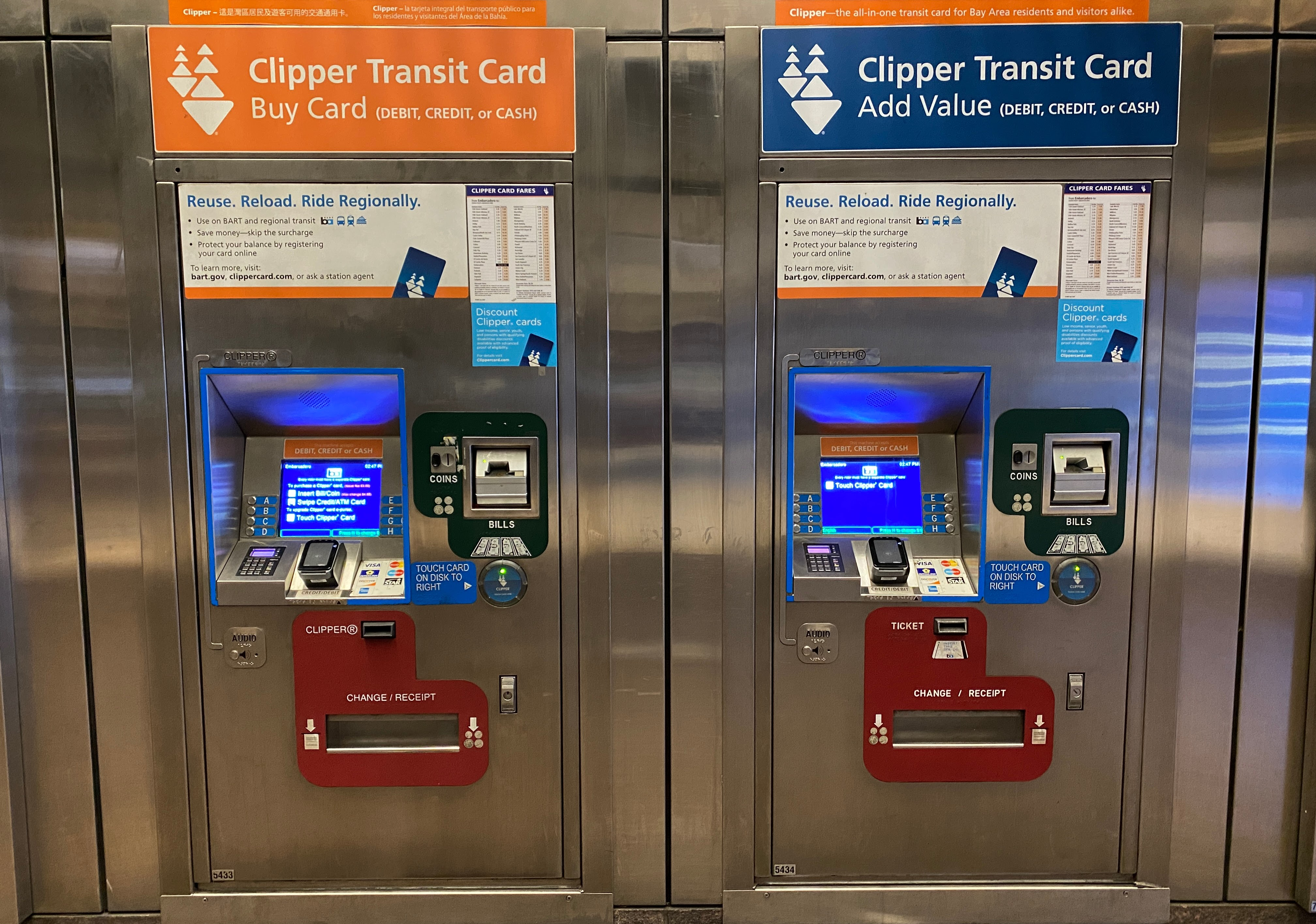
Two BART ticket machines at Embarcadero station in San Francisco. Both have been converted to Clipper card usage only. The machine on the left dispenses new Clipper cards and adds value to existing cards, while the machine on the right only adds value to existing cards.

=== Fare schedule ===
BART has distance-based fares, which requires riders to use fare gates to both enter and exit, with a flat fare of $2.15 for trips under 6 miles (9.7 km). A surcharge is added for trips traveling through the Transbay Tube ($1.40), to/from Oakland International Airport ($6.70) or San Francisco International Airport ($4.95), and to/from San Mateo County ($1.45, except $1.25 for Daly City). The maximum fare, including both airport surcharges and the Transbay surcharge, is $17.60; the maximum without surcharges (Antioch–Berryessa) is $10.30. As of June 2022, the average fare paid is $3.93.

Because of the varied fares, it is possible to enter the system with enough stored value for a shorter trip, but not a longer trip. Passengers without sufficient fare to complete their journey must use an add-fare machine to add value in order to exit the station.

Before August 20, 2025, entering and exiting at the same station within 30 minutes incurred an "excursion fare" of $6.40 – significantly higher than many station-to-station fares. This was originally introduced to allow people to tour the then-futuristic system; it was kept to discourage undesired behaviors such as tech bus riders using BART parking lots. The excursion fare has been criticized for negatively impacting riders who leave stations during service disruptions (although station agents can allow riders to exit without fare payment). As of August 20, 2025, riders paying using the contactless Tap and Ride system have a 30-minute grace period to avoid the BART excursion fare; Clipper card users still need to see an agent to avoid it.

Unlike many other rapid transit systems, BART does not have weekly or monthly passes with unlimited rides. The only discount provided to the general public is a 6.25% reduction when "high value tickets" (only available on Clipper cards with autoload) are purchased with fare values of $48 and $64. 50% discount is available to youth aged 5–18 (children age 4 and under ride free), and a 62.5% discount is provided to seniors and the disabled. The Clipper START program for low-income adults provides a 50% discount. The San Francisco Muni and BART offer a combined monthly "A" Fast Pass, which allows unlimited rides on Muni services plus BART service within San Francisco.

In August 2022, BART launched Clipper BayPass, a two-year pilot program to examine the viability of a transit pass that is compatible with all the public transit agencies in the Bay Area. The program was initially made available to around 50,000 college students and affordable housing residents.

=== Fare media ===
The primary fare media for BART is the Clipper card, which is used by most Bay Area transit agencies. Clipper is a contactless smart card; passengers tap in and out at card readers on fare gates. Clipper cards in Apple Pay and Google Wallet electronic wallets can also be used. As of August 20, 2025, riders can also pay using physical contactless credit or debit cards, or mobile payment methods, such as Apple Pay and Google Pay.

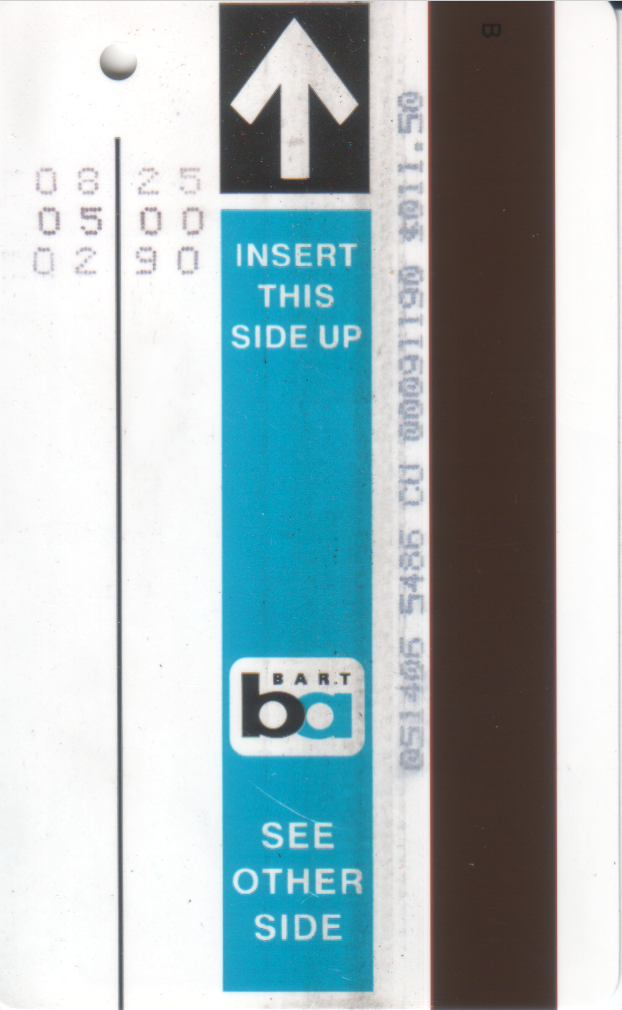
A legacy BART ticket. The initial purchased fare is printed parallel to the magnetic strip, and the card's balance is printed on the left, updated at each exit.

BART's original fare system used tickets made of a paper-plastic composite with a magnetic stripe. The tickets were sold by fare vending machines. When exiting, fare gates read the magnetically stored value on the card, encoded the new value with the fare subtracted, and printed the new value on the card. Tickets with no remaining value were retained by the machine rather than being returned. The entire fare system was designed and built by IBM under a $7 million contract (equivalent to $41 million in 2025). It was the third system in the US to use encoded-value magnetic stripe tickets, following the Illinois Central Gulf commuter line (now the Metra Electric District) in 1964 and the PATCO Speedline in 1968.

Although tickets could be refilled at fare machines, riders often discarded tickets with small values remaining. BART formerly relied on unused ticket values on such discarded cards for additional revenue – as much as $9.9 million annually in 1999 (equivalent to $18 million in 2025). Tickets stopped being sold in December 2020 in favor of Clipper cards, and can no longer be used. A 50-cent surcharge per trip (25 cents for discounted fares) is applied to all journeys made on paper tickets. However, due to supply chain shortages resulting in a lack of plastic Clipper cards, BART started issuing tickets again at the SFO station in October 2022. Sales of paper tickets again ended on September 30, 2023, and they were no longer usable after November 30.

BART first piloted a smart card for fare payment called EZ Rider in 2006; this program was abandoned in 2010 in favor of a regional farecard. In 2009, BART became one of the first five transit agencies to accept TransLink (later renamed Clipper) cards for fare payment and began phasing out tickets. By December 2020, all BART ticket machines, except for add-fare machines inside of paid areas, were converted to Clipper use only. Tickets were no longer accepted starting in December 2023.

== Ridership levels ==
For most of its history, BART's ridership has reflected the U.S. economy, growing modestly during periods of economic expansion and dropping slightly during recessions. A major exception occurred in 1989 in the aftermath of the Loma Prieta earthquake, which severely damaged the San Francisco–Oakland Bay Bridge, causing its closure for a month. BART became the only direct route between the East Bay and San Francisco, resulting in a nearly 17% ridership jump for the 1990 fiscal year. Ridership would not drop back to previous levels after the repair of the bridge until the COVID-19 pandemic began to affect the Bay Area in March 2020.

Between 2010 and 2015, BART ridership grew rapidly, mirroring strong economic growth in the Bay Area. In 2015, the system was carrying approximately 100,000 more passengers each day than it had five years earlier. High gasoline prices also contributed to growth, pushing ridership to record levels during 2012, with the system recording five record ridership days in September and October 2012.

After six straight years of expansion, ridership growth began to slow in late 2016, dropping by 1.7% in October 2016 from the prior year. Although the fiscal year ending June 30, 2017, showed an average weekday ridership of 423,395, the second-highest in BART's history, this was a 2.3% drop from FY 2016. Ridership continued to decline by approximately 3% per year between 2016 and 2019, mirroring a nationwide decline in mass transit ridership in the second half of the decade. The Washington Post and LA Streetsblog attributed the national decline in ridership to changes in commute patterns, the fall in gasoline prices since 2014, and competition from the private sector in the form of ride-hailing services such as Uber and Lyft. Ride-hailing has especially affected ridership on the lines to the San Francisco International Airport and the Oakland International Airport. At SFO, ride-hailing services grew by a factor of almost six or nearly 500% at the airport between 2014 and 2016. BART planners believe that competition from Uber and Lyft is reducing overall ridership growth and BART's share of airport transit.

Stations in the urban cores of San Francisco, Oakland, and Berkeley have the highest ridership, while suburban stations record lower rider numbers. During fiscal year 2017, the busiest station was Embarcadero with 48,526 average weekday exits, followed by Montgomery Street with 45,386. The busiest station outside of San Francisco was 12th Street Oakland City Center with 13,965 riders, followed by 19th Street Oakland with 13,456. The least busy station was Oakland International Airport with 1,517 riders, while the least busy standard BART station was North Concord / Martinez with 2,702 weekday exits.

BART's one-day ridership record was set on Halloween of 2012 with 568,061 passengers attending the San Francisco Giants' victory parade for their World Series championship. This surpassed the record set two years earlier of 522,198 riders in 2010 for the Giants' 2010 World Series victory parade. Before that, the record was 442,100 riders in October 2009, following an emergency closure of the Bay Bridge. During a planned closure of the Bay Bridge, there were 475,015 daily riders on August 30, 2013, making that the third highest ridership. On June 19, 2015, BART recorded 548,078 riders for the Golden State Warriors championship parade, placing second on the all-time ridership list.

BART set a Saturday record of 419,162 riders on February 6, 2016, coinciding with Super Bowl 50 events and a Golden State Warriors game. That easily surpassed the previous Saturday record of 319,484 riders, which occurred in October 2012, coinciding with several sporting events and Fleet Week. BART set a Sunday ridership record of 292,957 riders in June 2013, in connection with the San Francisco Gay Pride Parade, surpassing Sunday records set the previous two years when the Pride Parade was held.

Like many other transit agencies nationwide, ridership dropped sharply during the COVID-19 pandemic and associated lockdowns beginning in March 2020, during which BART was forced to drastically cut service. Ridership in the weeks immediately following the start of the Bay Area's lockdown (on March 17, 2020) fell by as much as 93%. If ridership does not recover and additional revenue is not obtained, in the worst case the agency projected it would only be able to sustain trains on three lines running once an hour from 5am to 9pm weekdays, and would have to close nine stations. BART was particularly negatively affected by the COVID-19 pandemic due to having a uniquely high percentage of its funding rely on its farebox recovery rate, which in 2019 was 72%, compared to the national average of 31.7%. In February 2026, the BART Board approved a plan to close up to 15 stations, end service at 9 pm, and increase fares by 30–50%, among other cost-cutting measures if voters rejected a proposed sales-tax increase.

As of May 2024, weekday ridership is at 41% of pre-pandemic levels, Saturday ridership is at 63%, and Sunday ridership is at 75%. On 25 August 2026, a post-pandemic ridership record was recorded at 239,936 passengers. On 6 October 2026, that record was be surpassed again at 254,866 passengers. In a 2022 survey, 31% of riders report household income below $50,000 (up from 26% in 2018), and 44% did not own a vehicle (up from 31% in 2018). Compared to the region, BART riders are more likely to be Black or Latino, and less likely to be White or Asian.

== Infrastructure ==
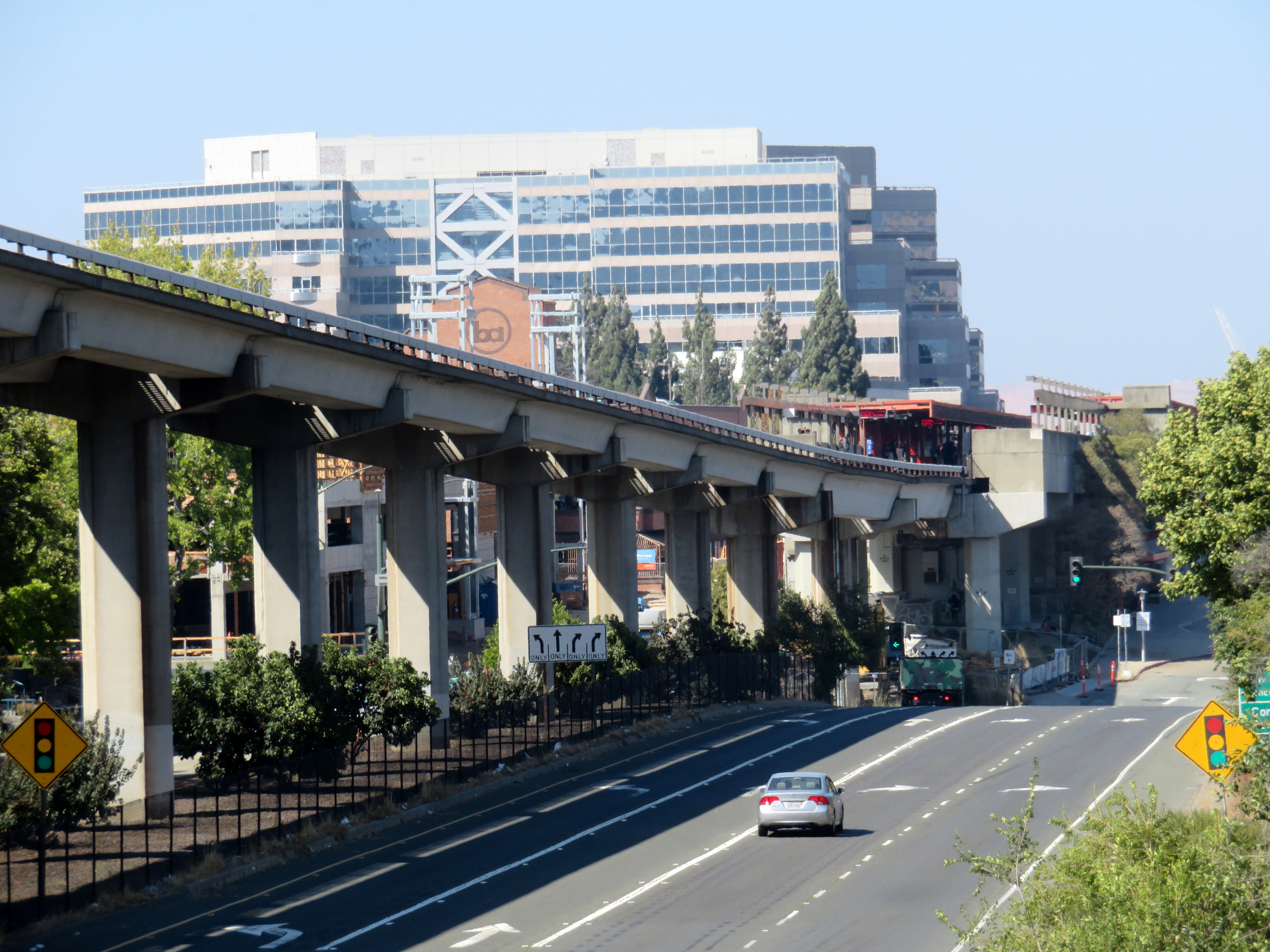
A typical concrete viaduct structure near Walnut Creek station

The entirety of the system runs in exclusive, grade-separated right-of-way. BART's rapid transit revenue routes cover about 131 miles (211 km) with 50 stations. On the main lines, approximately 28 miles (45 km) of lines run through underground sections with 32 miles (51 km) on elevated tracks. 1,000 volts DC is delivered to the trains over a third rail. An automated guideway transit line and an additional station were opened in 2014, using off-the-shelf cable car technology developed by DCC Doppelmayr Cable Car: the Cable Liner. The section of the Antioch-SFO/Millbrae line east of the Pittsburg/Bay Point station, known as eBART, runs on conventional unelectrified 4 ft 8 1/2 in (1,435 mm) standard gauge rail.

The main system uses an unusual 5 ft 6 in (1,676 mm) broad gauge (mostly seen in India and Pakistan) and mostly ballastless track. Originally using flat-edge rail and wheelsets with cylindrical treads, in 2016 BART started switching to conical treads to reduce the noise caused by flange/rail contact and loss of adhesion of one of the wheels on curves. BART trains were so unpleasantly noisy that a recording while inside the Transbay Tube, described as "the worst sound in the history of man", was used in the 2008 horror video game Dead Space.

Schedules call for trains to operate at up to 70 miles per hour (110 km/h), but certain segments (in particular, the Transbay Tube) are designed for 80 mph (130 km/h) operation when making up delays.

The minimum train length is four cars, and the maximum length is ten cars. A ten-car train is 710 feet (220 m), the longest of any metro system in the United States, and extending slightly beyond the 700-foot-long (210 m) platforms. Cars are 10.5 feet (3.2 m) wide, the maximum gradient is four percent, and the minimum curve radius is 394 feet (120 m). The combination of unique loading gauges and unusual rail technologies has complicated maintenance and increased cost of the system, as rolling stock requires custom wheelsets, brake systems, and power systems.

Many of the original 1970s-era stations, especially the aerial stations, feature simple Brutalist architecture, but newer stations are a mix of Neomodern and Postmodern architecture. The additional double-tracked four-mile-long (6.4 km) upper deck of the Market Street subway and its four underground stations were built by BART for Muni Metro.

=== Lines ===
The routes run on track segments ("lines"), which are internally, but not commonly, known by letters.

Line	Endpoints	Opened	Right of way
Heavy rail
A-Line	Oakland Wye – Fremont	September 11, 1972	Former Western Pacific Railroad right-of-way (UP Oakland Subdivision), tunnel near the Oakland Wye
C-Line	Rockridge – Pittsburg/Bay Point	May 21, 1973 (to Concord); December 16, 1995 (to North Concord/Martinez); December 7, 1996 (to Pittsburg/Bay Point)	SR 24 median, Berkeley Hills Tunnel, former Sacramento Northern Railway right-of-way, SR 4 median
K-Line	Oakland Wye – Rockridge	September 11, 1972 (to MacArthur); May 21, 1973 (to Rockridge)	Tunnel under Broadway, SR 24 median
L-Line	Bay Fair – Dublin/Pleasanton	May 10, 1997	Median of I-238, median of I-580
M-Line	Oakland Wye – Daly City Yard (north of Colma)	November 5, 1973 (Daly City – Montgomery Street); September 16, 1974 (Montgomery Street – Oakland Wye); December 9, 1988 (to Daly City Yard)	Elevated above 5th and 7th streets, Transbay Tube, tunnel under Market Street and Mission Street, former Southern Pacific Railroad right-of-way (Ocean View Branch)
R-Line	MacArthur – Richmond	January 29, 1973	Elevated above Martin Luther King Jr. Way, tunnel under Adeline St and Shattuck Ave, former Santa Fe/California and Nevada right-of-way
S-Line	Fremont – Berryessa/North San José	March 25, 2017 (to Warm Springs/South Fremont); June 13, 2020 (to Berryessa/North San José)	Tunnel under Fremont Central Park, former Western Pacific Railroad right-of-way (San Jose Branch)
W-Line	Daly City Yard – Millbrae	February 24, 1996 (to Colma); June 22, 2003 (to Millbrae)	Former Southern Pacific Railroad right-of-way (Ocean View Branch), shared Caltrain right-of-way
Y-Line	W-Line – San Francisco International Airport	June 22, 2003	Elevated wye into San Francisco International Airport
Light rail
E-Line	Pittsburg/Bay Point – Antioch	May 26, 2018	SR 4 median
Automated guideway transit (AGT)
H-Line	Coliseum – Oakland International Airport	November 22, 2014	Mostly elevated above Hegenberger Road, depressed section below Doolittle Drive

=== Automation ===
BART was one of the first U.S. rail transit systems of any size to be substantially automated. Routing and dispatching of trains, and adjustments for schedule recovery are controlled by a combination of computer and human supervision at BART's Operations Control Center (OCC) and headquarters at the Kaiser Center in Downtown Oakland. Station-to-station train movement, including speed control and maintenance of separation between successive trains, is entirely automatic under normal operation, the operator's routine responsibilities being issuing announcements, closing the doors after station stops, and monitoring the track ahead for hazards. In unusual circumstances the operator controls the train manually at reduced speed.

In 2000, BART introduced the Advance Passenger Information System (APIS), a real-time arrival prediction system developed by Lucent Technologies. Automatic vehicle locations feed arrival time estimates on overhead screens, as well as application programming interfaces for consumer navigation applications. Voiceover announcements are provided by "George" and "Gracie", two built-in voice synthesizers assigned to opposite tracks. APIS has not been substantially upgraded since its introduction. Once cutting-edge assistive technology, the voices are considered dated as of 2026 but have gained a cult following.

=== Parking ===
Many BART stations offer parking; however, underpricing causes station parking lots to overflow in the morning. Pervasive congestion and underpricing forces some to drive to distant stations in search of parking. BART operates Parking Lots at 36 stations and offers parking passes for designated spots at many stations.

BART offers long-term airport parking through a third-party vendor at most East Bay stations. Travelers must make an online reservation in advance and pay the daily fee of $5 before they can leave their cars at the BART parking lot.

Parking at stations in Santa Clara County (Milpitas and Berryessa/North San José) is managed by Santa Clara Valley Transportation Authority rather than BART.

=== Accessibility ===
All BART trains have dedicated spaces for wheelchair users and every station has accessible elevators. Estimated train arrival times and service announcements are both displayed on platform-level screens and announced audibly over the public address system. Station platforms are equipped with tactile paving to aid those with visual impairments, and Braille/tactile signs are present throughout stations.

==== Platform elevators ====
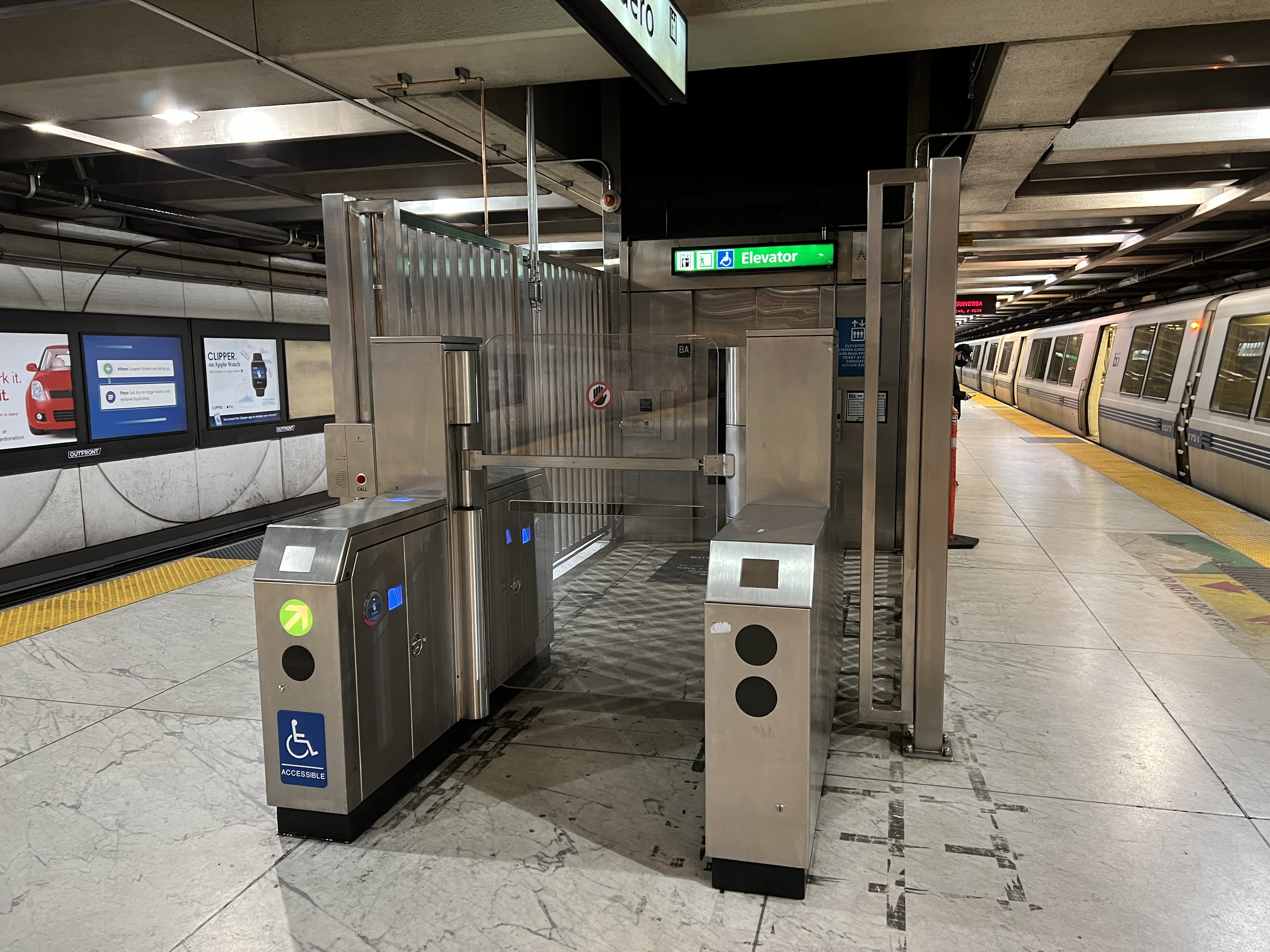
The elevator faregate on the Embarcadero station BART platform, installed in December 2021

At some stations, the elevator to the platform (which is inside the paid area) is accessed from an unpaid area of the station. To enter the BART system at one of these stations, passengers using the elevator must first pass through a faregate into the paid area and then exit back through the swing gate adjacent to the station agent booth before taking the elevator to the platform. To exit the system from one of these stations, passengers must do the reverse: take the elevator from the platform to the concourse level, enter the paid area through the swing gate, and then process their ticket at a faregate to exit the paid area once again. Station agents may be able to assist upon request. The configuration of these stations enables fare evasion and causes confusion for passengers.

As of 2020, eighteen stations (Note: 12th Street Oakland City Center, 19th Street Oakland, Balboa Park, Bay Fair, Civic Center, Coliseum, Concord, Downtown Berkeley, El Cerrito del Norte, El Cerrito Plaza, Embarcadero, Montgomery, North Berkeley, Orinda, Powell, Rockridge, South Hayward, and Walnut Creek) had a platform elevator outside of the paid area. Of these, three stations (Note: Coliseum, North Berkeley, and Walnut Creek) had ticket processing machines near the elevators that allowed elevator users to avoid having to enter, then exit, then re-enter the paid area; however, these did nothing to deter fare evasion. BART has begun to correct this issue at stations either by expanding the paid area on the concourse level or by installing a single accessible faregate in front of the elevator doors. By December 2021, the number of stations with elevators outside the paid area had been reduced to eight. (Note: 19th Street Oakland, Civic Center, El Cerrito Plaza, North Berkeley, Orinda, Powell, Rockridge, and Walnut Creek) Five of these stations (Note: Civic Center, El Cerrito Plaza, North Berkeley, Orinda, and Walnut Creek) had elevator faregates installed by January 2023, while the paid area on the concourse level at 19th Street Oakland was expanded to include a new elevator as part of a larger renovation. As of March 2023, only Orinda and Powell Street stations have a platform elevator outside the paid area. New elevator faregates are expected to be installed at these two remaining stations by April 2023.

=== Cell phone and Wi-Fi ===
In 2004, BART became the first transit system in the United States to offer cellular telephone communication to passengers of all major wireless carriers on its trains underground. Service was made available for customers of Verizon Wireless, Sprint/Nextel, AT&T Mobility, and T-Mobile in and between the four San Francisco Market Street stations from Civic Center to Embarcadero. In 2009, service was expanded to include the Transbay Tube, thus providing continuous cellular coverage between West Oakland and Balboa Park. In 2010, service was expanded to all underground stations in Oakland (19th Street, 12th Street/Oakland City Center, and Lake Merritt).

In 2007, BART ran a beta test of Wi-Fi Internet access for travelers. It initially included the four San Francisco downtown stations: Embarcadero, Montgomery, Powell, and Civic Center. It included above ground testing to trains at BART's Hayward Test Track. The testing and deployment were extended into the underground interconnecting tubes between the four downtown stations and further. The successful demonstration provided for a ten-year contract with WiFi Rail, Inc. for the services throughout the BART right of way. In 2008, the Wi-Fi service was expanded to include the Transbay Tube. BART terminated the relationship with Wi-Fi Rail in December 2014, citing that WiFi Rail had not submitted an adequate financial or technical plan for completing the network throughout the BART system.

In 2011, during the Charles Hill killing and aftermath BART disabled cell phone service to hamper demonstrators. The ensuing controversy drew widespread coverage that raised legal questions about free speech rights of protesters and the federal telecommunications laws that relate to passengers. In response, BART released an official policy on cutting off cell phone service.

== Organization and management ==
2012 statistics
Number of vehicles	670
Initial system cost	$1.6 billion
Equivalent cost in 2004 dollars (replacement cost)	$15 billion
Hourly passenger capacity	15,000
Maximum daily capacity	360,000
Average weekday ridership	365,510
Annual operating revenue	$379.10 million
Annual expenses	$619.10 million
Annual profits (losses)	($240.00 million)
Rail cost/passenger mile (excluding capital costs)	$0.332

=== Governance ===
The San Francisco Bay Area Rapid Transit District is a special district consisting of Alameda County, Contra Costa County, and the City and County of San Francisco. San Mateo County, which hosts six BART stations, and Santa Clara County, which hosts two, are not part of the BART District. A nine-member elected Board of Directors represents nine districts. BART has its own police force.

While the district includes all of the cities and communities in its jurisdiction, some of these cities do not have stations on the BART system. This has caused tensions among property owners in cities like Livermore who pay BART taxes but must travel outside the city to receive BART service. In areas like Fremont, the majority of commuters do not commute in the direction that BART would take them (many Fremonters commute to San Jose). This would be remedied with the completion of the Silicon Valley BART extension. Phase I of the extension opened on June 13, 2020, giving San Jose its first BART station, Berryessa/North San José station.

==== BART Board of Directors ====
District	Stations Included	Counties Included	Board Member
1	Concord, Lafayette, Pleasant Hill/Contra Costa Centre, Walnut Creek	Contra Costa	Matt Rinn
2	Antioch, Concord (partial), North Concord/Martinez, Pittsburg/Bay Point, Pittsburg Center	Contra Costa	Mark Foley
3	Bay Fair, Downtown Berkeley, El Cerrito del Norte (partial), El Cerrito Plaza (partial), North Berkeley, Orinda, Rockridge, San Leandro	Alameda/Contra Costa	Barnali Ghosh
4	Bay Fair, Coliseum, Fruitvale, Hayward (partial), Oakland International Airport, San Leandro, and South Hayward (partial)	Alameda	Robert Raburn
5	Castro Valley, Dublin/Pleasanton, Hayward, West Dublin/Pleasanton	Alameda	Melissa Hernandez
6	Fremont, South Hayward (partial), Union City, Warm Springs/South Fremont	Alameda	Liz Ames
7	Ashby, El Cerrito del Norte (partial), El Cerrito Plaza (partial), MacArthur (partial), Montgomery (partial), Richmond, West Oakland, Embarcadero (partial)	Alameda/Contra Costa/San Francisco	Victor Flores
8	Balboa Park, Embarcadero (partial), Glen Park (partial), Montgomery (partial), Powell Street (partial)	San Francisco	Janice Li
9	16th Street Mission, 24th Street Mission, Glen Park, Civic Center, Powell Street, Balboa Park (partial)	San Francisco	Edward Wright

==== BART General Managers ====
- B. R. Stokes (1963–1974)
- Larry Dahms (Acting)
- Frank Herringer
- Keith Bernard
- Frank Wilson (1989–1994)
- Richard A. White (1994–1996)
- Thomas Margro (1996–2007)
- Dorothy Dugger (2007–2011)
- Grace Crunican (2011–2019)
- Bob Powers (2019–present)

=== Budget ===
In 2005, BART required nearly $300 million in funds after fares. About 37% of the costs went to maintenance, 29% to actual transportation operations, 24% to general administration, 8% to police services, and 4% to construction and engineering. In 2005, 53% of the budget was derived from fares, 32% from taxes, and 15% from other sources, including advertising, station retail space leasing, and parking fees. BART reported a farebox recovery ratio of 75.67% in February 2016, up from 2012's 68.2%. BART train operators and station agents had a maximum salary of $62,000 per year with an average of $17,000 in overtime pay. BART management claimed that in 2013, union train operators and station agents averaged about $71,000 in base salary and $11,000 in overtime, and pay a $92 monthly fee from that for health insurance.

In FY26 BART reported a $250.7 million deficit covered by SB 125 emergency assistance, leaving BART with $70.8 million left in SB 125 emergency assistance. BART made $369.3 million in operating revenue, 13% higher than the previous year, along with an additional $531 million from financial assistance. BART spent $1.01 billion in total operating costs, 0.4% less than 2025. Labor costs were cut by $15 million as a result of ongoing salary and hiring freezes. Non labor costs, such as electric power, increased by a total of 4.6%. Train operators and station agents have a maximum salary of $100,795.97 per year as of 2026. New fare gates were installed in August 2025, which increased fare revenue by $10 million.

In the 2026 United States elections, voters in the Bay Area approved Measure RTM, which would increase sales tax by 0.5% in Alameda, Santa Clara, San Mateo and Contra Costa counties as well as a 1% increase in San Francisco to fund BART with $310 million yearly beginning in FY28.

== Incidents and controversies ==
=== BART Police shootings ===
==== Oscar Grant III ====
On January 1, 2009, a BART Police officer, Johannes Mehserle, fatally shot Oscar Grant III. Eyewitnesses gathered direct evidence of the shooting with video cameras, which were later submitted to and disseminated by media outlets and watched hundreds of thousands of times in the days following the shooting. Both peaceful and violent demonstrations occurred protesting the shooting.

BART held multiple public meetings to ease tensions led by BART Director Carole Ward Allen who called on the BART Board to hire two independent auditors to investigate the shooting, and to provide recommendations to the board regarding BART Police misconduct. Director Ward Allen established BART's first Police Department Review Committee and worked with Assemblyman Sandre Swanson to pass AB 1586 in the California State Legislature, which enforced civilian oversight of the BART Police Department. BART Director Lynette Sweet said that "BART has not handled this [situation] correctly," and called for the BART police chief and general manager to step down, but only one other BART Director, Tom Radulovich, supported such action.

Mehserle was arrested and charged with murder, to which he pleaded not guilty. Oakland civil rights attorney John Burris filed a US$25 million wrongful death claim against the district on behalf of Grant's daughter and girlfriend. Mehserle's trial was subsequently moved to Los Angeles following concerns that he would be unable to get a fair trial in Alameda County. On July 8, 2010, Mehserle was found guilty on a lesser charge of involuntary manslaughter. He was released on parole on June 13, 2011.

==== Charles Hill ====
On July 3, 2011, an officer of the BART Police shot and killed Charles Hill at Civic Center Station in San Francisco. Hill had thrown a bottle at the officers and was in the process of throwing a knife at them from a distance of about 15 feet when the first shot was fired.

On August 12, 2011, BART shut down cellphone services on the network for three hours in an effort to hamper possible protests against the shooting and to keep communications away from protesters at the Civic Center station in San Francisco. The shutdown caught the attention of state senator Leland Yee and international media, as well as drawing comparisons to the internet shutdowns during the Egyptian revolution earlier that year. Antonette Bryant, the union president for BART, stated that "BART have lost our confidence and are putting rider and employee safety at risk."

Members of Anonymous broke into BART's website and posted names, phone numbers, addresses, and e-mail information on the Anonymous website.

On August 15, 2011, there was more disruption in service at BART stations in downtown San Francisco. The San Francisco Examiner reported that the protests were a result of the shootings, including that of Oscar Grant.

On August 29, 2011, a coalition of nine public interest groups led by Public Knowledge filed an Emergency Petition asking the U.S. Federal Communications Commission (FCC) to declare "that the actions taken by the Bay Area Rapid Transit District ("BART") on August 11, 2011, violated the Communications Act of 1934, as amended, when it deliberately interfered with access to Commercial Mobile Radio Service ("CMRS") by the public" and "that local law enforcement has no authority to suspend or deny CMRS, or to order CMRS providers to suspend or deny service, absent a properly obtained order from the Commission, a state commission of appropriate jurisdiction, or a court of law with appropriate jurisdiction".

In December 2011 BART adopted a new "Cell Service Interruption Policy" that only allows shutdowns of cell phone services within BART facilities "in the most extraordinary circumstances that threaten the safety of District passengers, employees and other members of public, the destruction of District property, or the substantial disruption of public transit service". According to a spokesperson for BART, under the new policy the wireless phone system would not be turned off under circumstances similar to those in August 2011. Instead police officers would arrest individuals who break the law.

In February 2012, the San Francisco District Attorney concluded that the BART Police Officer that shot and killed Charles Hill at the Civic Center BART station the previous July "acted lawfully in self defense" and would not face charges for the incident.

In March 2012, the FCC requested public comment on the question of whether or when the police and other government officials can intentionally interrupt cellphone and Internet service to protect public safety.

A federal lawsuit filed against BART by Charles Hill's brother was dismissed in 2013. The federal judge concluded that "a reasonable officer in that situation could believe that he was in danger of being hit by a knife after having had a bottle thrown at him." The lawyers of Hill's family did not dispute that he had thrown a knife at the officer, but argued that both officers should have done more to deescalate the situation.

=== Worker fatalities ===
==== 1979 fatal electrical fire ====
In January 1979, an electrical fire occurred on a train as it was passing through the Transbay Tube. One firefighter (Lt. William Elliott, 50, of the Oakland Fire Department) was killed in the effort to extinguish the blaze. Since then, safety regulations have been updated.

==== James Strickland ====
On October 14, 2008, track inspector James Strickland was struck and killed by a train as he was walking along a section of track between the Concord and Pleasant Hill BART stations. Strickland's death started an investigation into BART's safety alert procedures. At the time of the accident, BART had assigned trains headed in opposite directions to a shared track for routine maintenance. BART came under further fire in February 2009 for allegedly delaying payment of death benefits to Strickland's family.

==== October 2013 incident ====
On October 19, 2013, a BART engineering manager and contractor were struck and killed by a train near Walnut Creek while inspecting a track defect. Due to an ongoing labor strike, both the track workers and the train operators were working outside their usual roles. The train was carrying management employees being trained as substitute operators and maintenance workers. The track workers were working under a safety protocol known as "simple approval" which required the workers to be aware of train movements and provide their own protection. The National Transportation Safety Board found that the "simple approval" practice was the probable cause of the incident. BART was fined $600,000 for the incident.

=== Crime ===
==== Fare evasion ====
In 2019, BART estimated that 5% of riders evade fares, costing an estimated $15 to $25 million annually. In March 2023, BART announced plans to install new gates resistant to fare evasion. The project, which was projected to cost $90 million, began with a pilot program at West Oakland station and was completed system-wide in August 2025.

==== Violent crime ====
In mid-2017, BART came under criticism for refusing to publicly release video evidence of crimes committed at Oakland stations. That year, in at least three incidents, groups of young people had boarded stopped trains and attacked and robbed train riders. In response to the criticism, one BART manager argued that "to release these videos would create a high level of racially insensitive commentary toward the district [...] and in addition it would create a racial bias in the riders against minorities on the trains." A spokesman also stated that state laws about "juvenile police records" prohibited BART from releasing surveillance video.

In 2018, BART released surveillance video from one of the 2017 incidents, showing (as summarized by KRON4) "the moments leading up to a mob-style attack on a BART train [... with] about 40 teens jumping the fare gates and pushing through the emergency gates at the station as an overwhelmed station agent calls for help." BART stated that two juveniles and an 18-year-old had been arrested for the incident, with the 18-year-old ending up serving one year in jail. In September 2017, six victims of the robberies/assaults filed suit against BART for gross negligence, claiming BART did not provide adequate security for its riders. In January 2020, two passengers affected by the same incident lost their lawsuits, one of them on the grounds that she had been attacked on the platform rather than on the train, outside of BART's common carrier duties.

On July 22, 2018, a man fatally stabbed 18-year-old Nia Wilson with a knife as she exited a train car at the MacArthur station. This was the third homicide at a BART station within five days. In June 2019, the Alameda County Civil Grand Jury released a report documenting a 128% increase in thefts on BART between 2014 and 2018, and an 83% increase in aggravated assault during the same time period.
