= Orinda station =

Rapid transit station in Orinda, California, US

Orinda
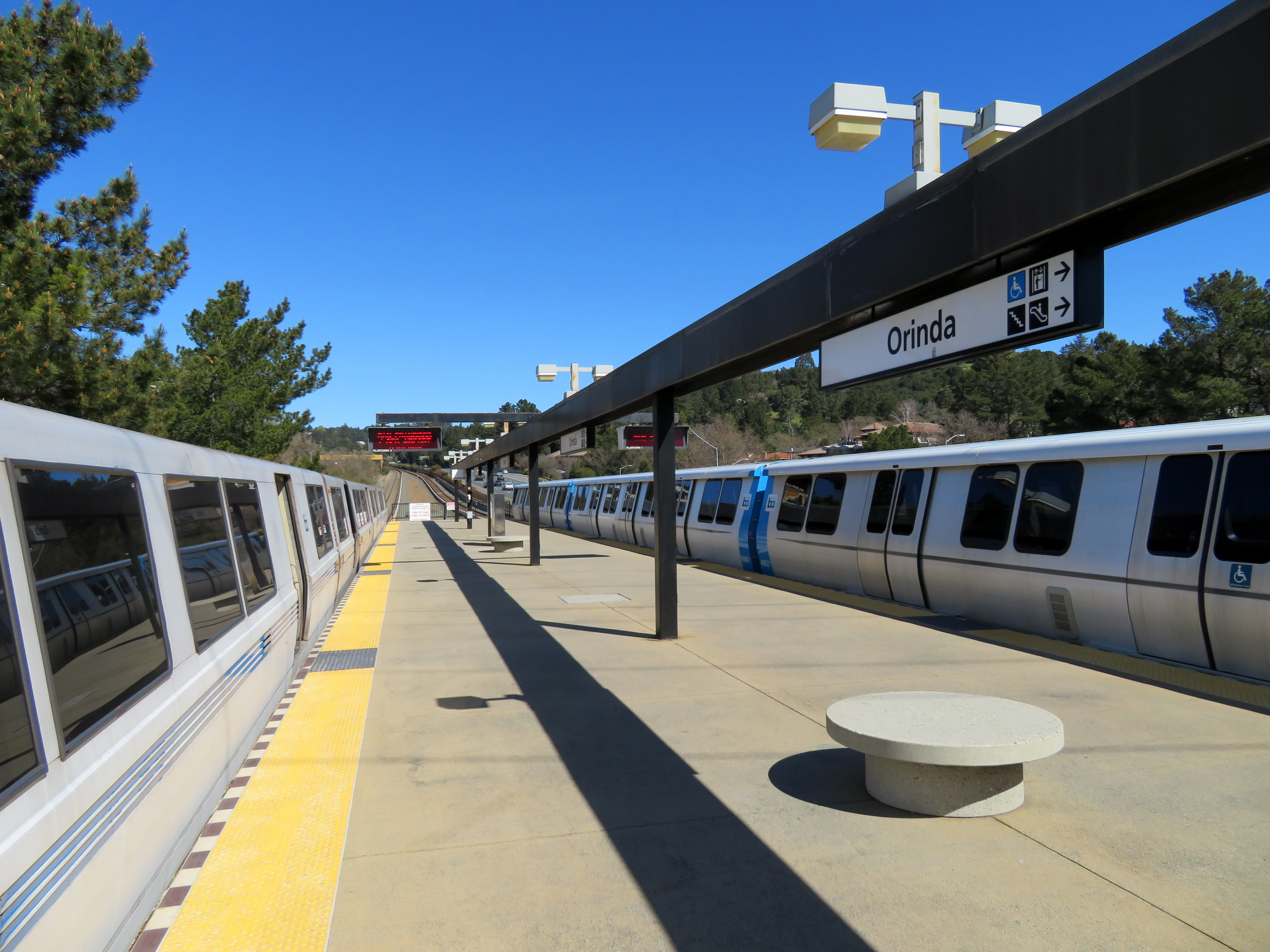
- Two trains at Orinda station in March 2018

General information
- Location: 11 Camino Pablo; Orinda, California
- Coordinates: 37.878427°N 122.18374°W
- Line: BART C-Line
- Platforms: 1 island platform
- Tracks: 2
- Connections: County Connection: 6, 606

Construction
- Structure type: Elevated
- Parking: 1,406 spaces
- Cycle facilities: 24 lockers
- Accessible: Yes
- Architect: Gwathmey, Sellier & Crosby; Joseph Esherick & Associates

Other information
- Station code: BART: ORIN

History
- Opened: May 21, 1973

Passengers
- 2025: 1,529 (weekday average)

Services
Preceding station	Bay Area Rapid Transit	Following station
Rockridge toward SFO or Millbrae	Yellow Line	Lafayette toward Antioch via Pittsburg/Bay Point
Location

Orinda station is a Bay Area Rapid Transit station in Orinda, California. The station has an island platform in the center median of State Route 24. It is served by the Yellow Line. An abstract mural by Win Ng, partially covered by advertisements, is located in the fare lobby.

== History ==
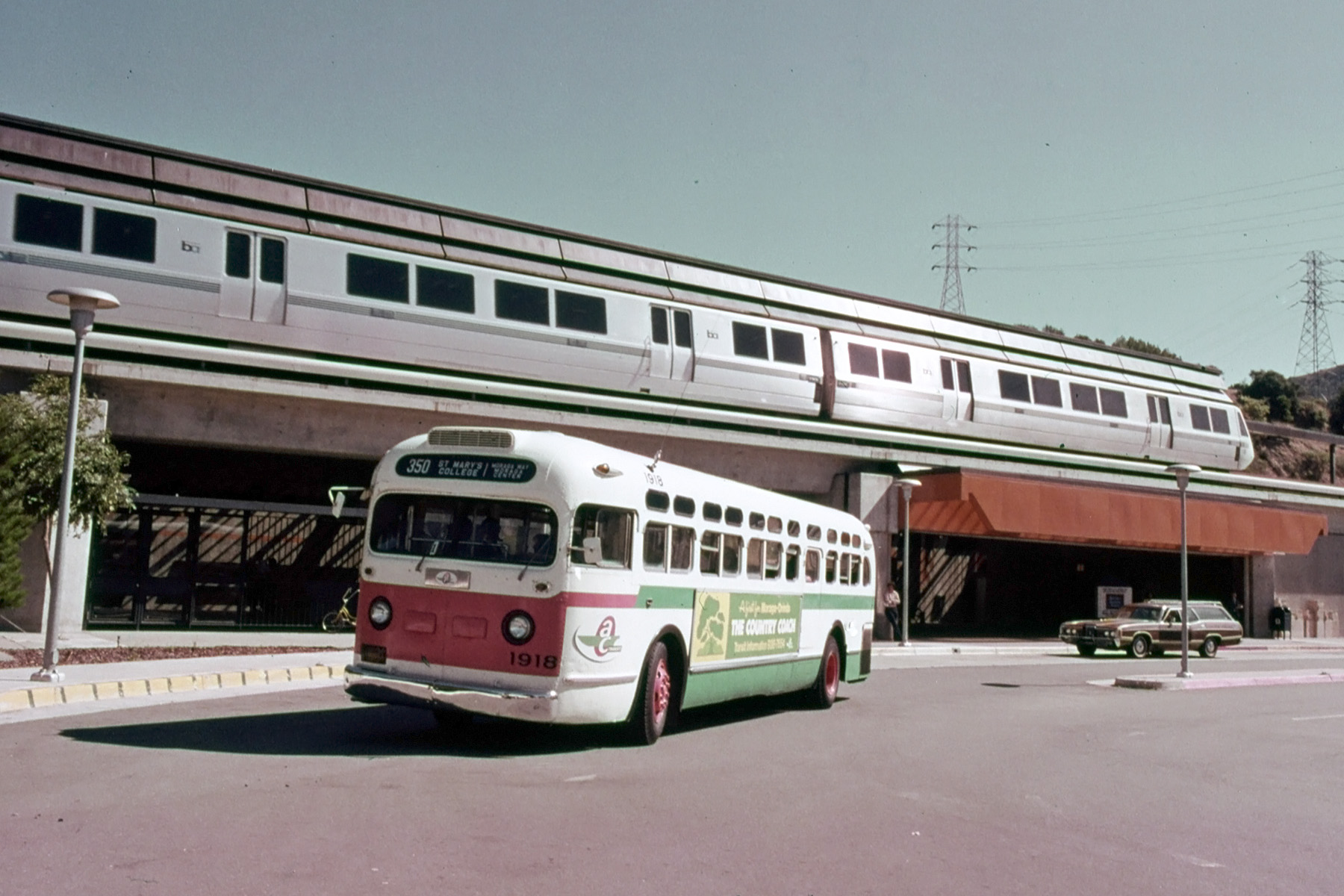
An AC Transit bus and BART train at the station between 1976 and 1982

The BART Board approved the name "Orinda" in December 1965. Service at the station began on May 21, 1973, following the completion of the Berkeley Hills Tunnel, which connects it to Rockridge station. AC Transit began operating local bus service under contract in central Contra Costa County in the 1970s after the coming of BART. Service began in Moraga and Orinda on September 13, 1976. The service was transferred to County Connection on June 7, 1982.

In 2008, BART added solar panels over parking areas at Orinda station, as well as the Richmond and Hayward maintenance yards. The $3.8 million project was expected to provide all station electrical needs during daylight hours.

Thirteen BART stations, including Orinda, did not originally have faregates for passengers using the elevator. In 2020, BART started a project to add faregates to elevators at these stations. Orinda was the last station to be modified; the new faregate in the lobby was installed in July 2023.

BART operates and maintains the surface parking lots at the station, but does not own them. As of 2024, BART indicates "significant market, local support, and/or implementation barriers" that must be overcome to allow transit-oriented development on the parking lots. Such development would not begin until at least the mid-2030s.
