= San Leandro LINKS =

Free public transit service in California, US

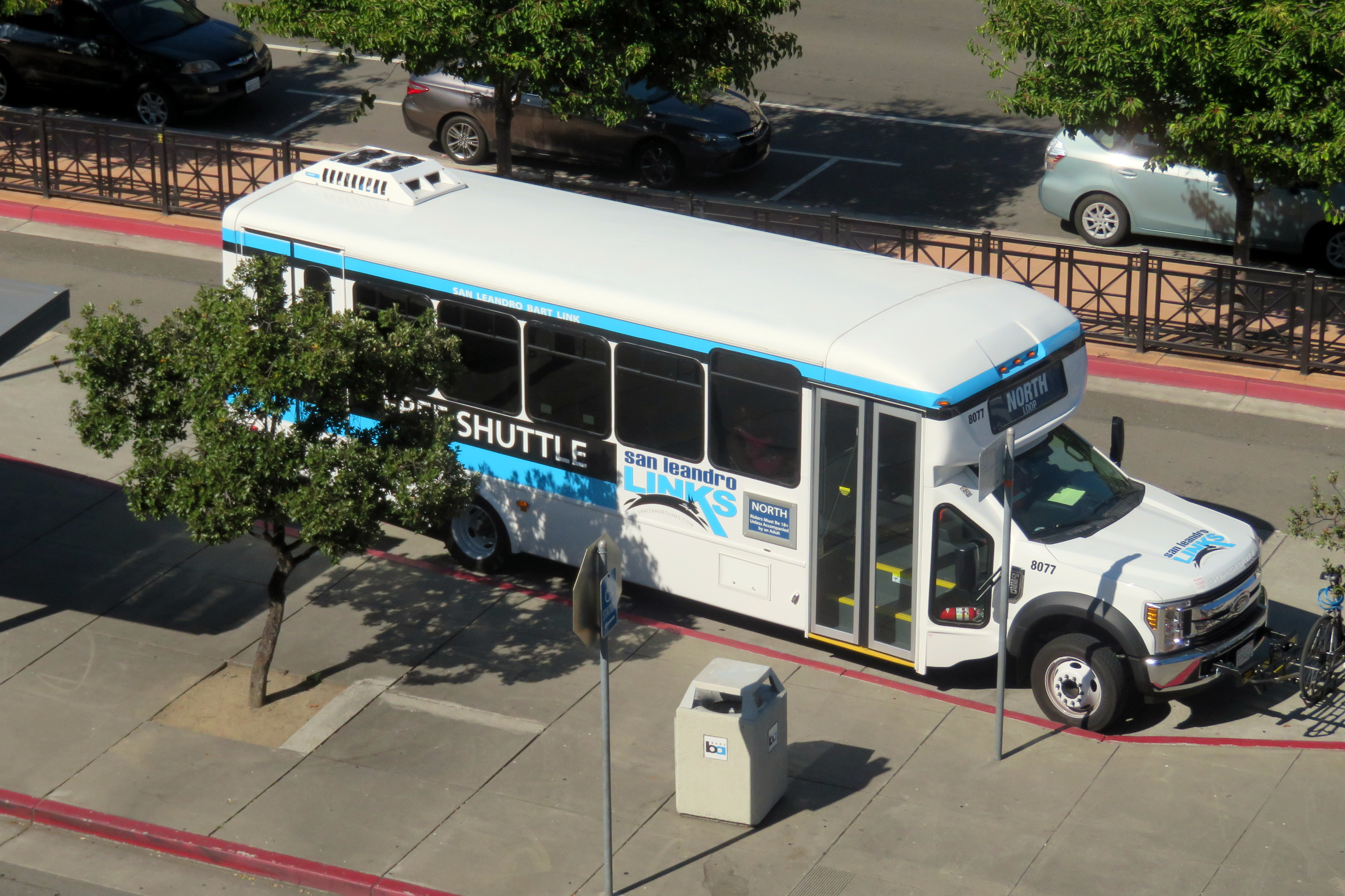
LINKS bus at San Leandro station

San Leandro LINKS or West San Leandro Shuttle usually referred to simply as the Links Bus is a free public transit service in San Leandro, California. It is run by the San Leandro Transit Management Organization.

== Service ==
The service began after its creation by the city of San Leandro in 2002. The services currently offers one line, BART Shuttle also known simply as LINKS. The shuttle has been successful since its inception year when it transported 9,000 passengers a month.

The shuttle service's vehicles use compressed natural gas coaches.

The bus line operates on a counter-clockwise loop connecting job centers in San Leandro with the San Leandro BART station. The bus services is partially funded by the West San Leandro Shuttle Business Improvement District. This special district is funded by a special purpose business fee on the business community of the westside. In 2008 the tax was and therefore the service was extended for another five years until 2013 because more than 50% of businesses did not "protest".

Passengers may connect to BART trains from throughout the Bay Area at this station on the Orange and Green lines. There are also half a dozen AC Transit bus lines that connect at the San Leandro BART station transit center. The service runs from 5 AM to 9 AM and then from 3 PM to 8 PM Monday through Friday. Links coaches travel on 30 minute headways.
