= Rockridge station =

Metro station in Oakland, California, US

Rockridge
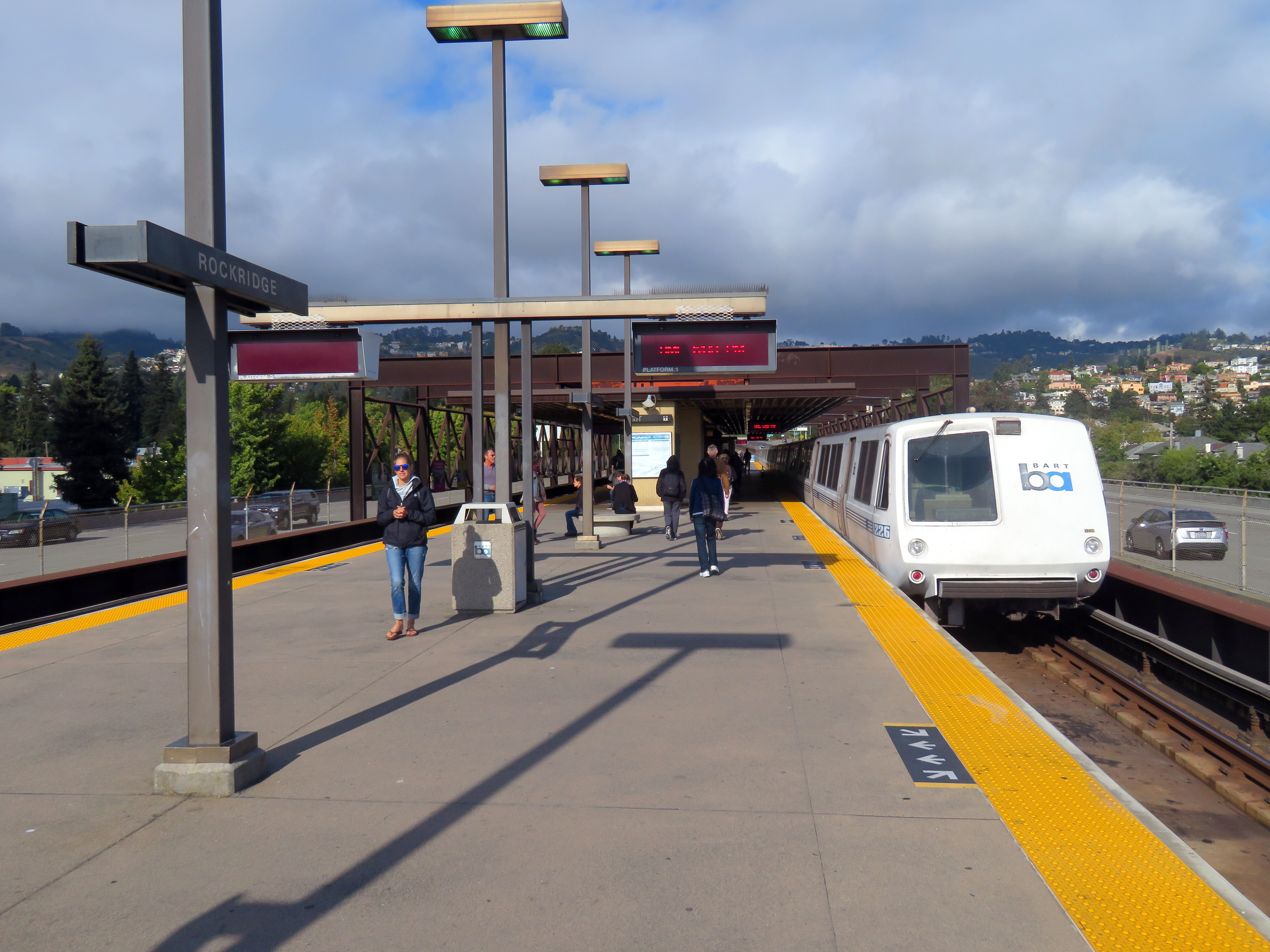
- An eastbound train leaving Rockridge station in September 2019

General information
- Location: 5660 College Avenue; Oakland, California
- Coordinates: 37.844452°N 122.252083°W
- Line: BART C-Line
- Platforms: 1 island platform
- Tracks: 2
- Connections: AC Transit: 36, 51A, 51B, 605, 688, 851; Mills College Shuttle

Construction
- Structure type: Elevated
- Parking: 903 spaces
- Cycle facilities: Racks, 72 lockers
- Accessible: Yes
- Architect: Maher & Martens

Other information
- Station code: BART: ROCK

History
- Opened: May 21, 1973

Passengers
- 2025: 3,008 (weekday average)

Services
Preceding station	Bay Area Rapid Transit	Following station
MacArthur toward SFO or Millbrae	Yellow Line	Orinda toward Antioch via Pittsburg/Bay Point
Location

Rockridge station is a Bay Area Rapid Transit station located in the Rockridge district of Oakland, California. Located in the center median of the elevated State Route 24 west of the Caldecott Tunnel, the station has a single island platform serving two tracks. It is served by the Yellow Line.

== History ==
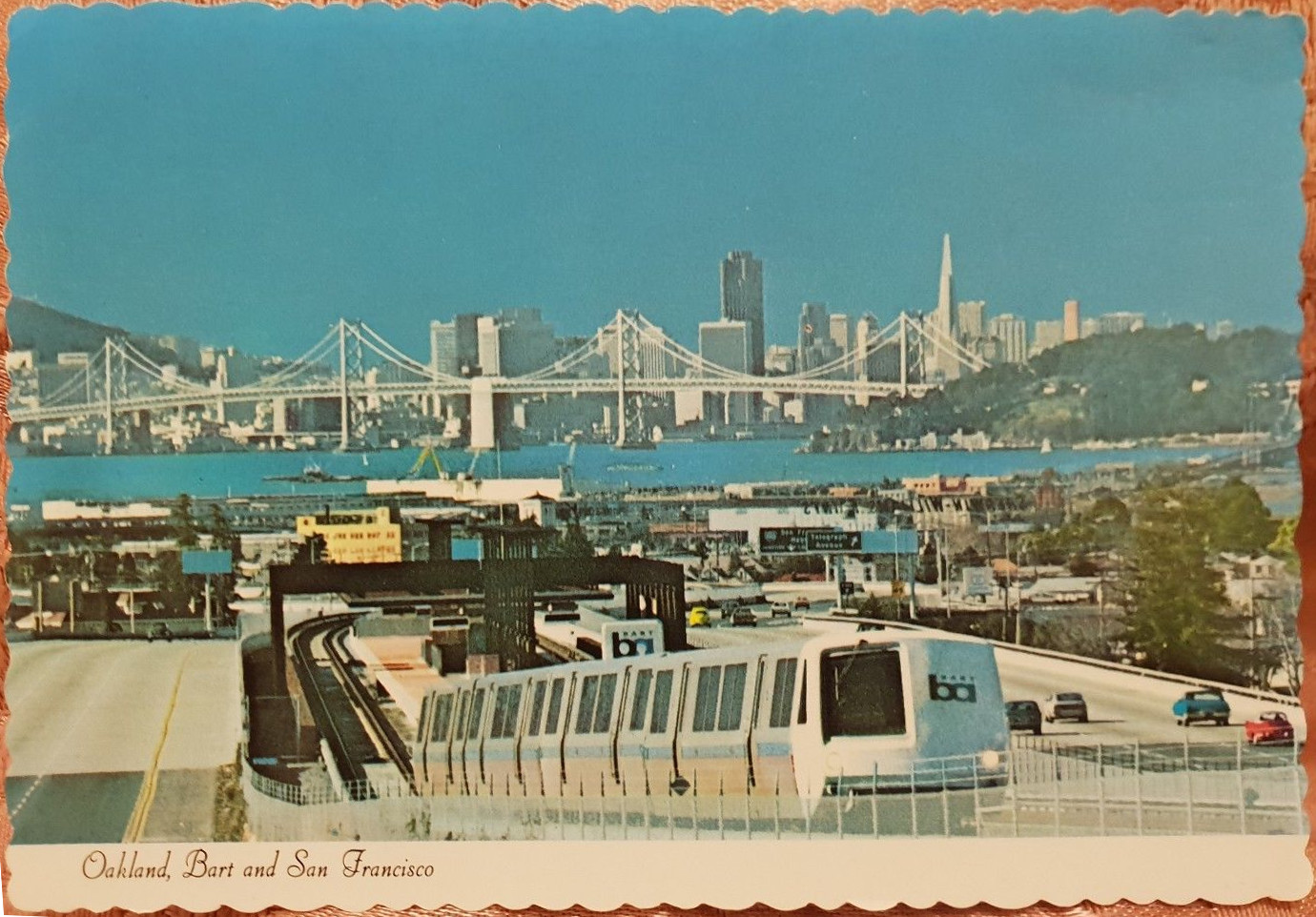
1970s postcard of the station

By August 1965, BART proposed to call the station "Claremont", while a city committee had rejected "College–Shafter" and "Temescal". A BART committee proposed "Rockridge" in October 1965; it was accepted by the BART Board that December. Service at Rockridge commenced on May 21, 1973, after the construction of the Berkeley Hills Tunnel was completed.

Seismic retrofit work took place at the station in 2008–2009 and above the parking lots in 2015. Thirteen BART stations, including Rockridge, did not originally have faregates for passengers using the elevator. In 2020, BART started a project to add faregates to elevators at these stations. The new faregate on the platform at Rockridge was installed in July 2022.

As of 2024, BART indicates "significant market, local support, and/or implementation barriers" that must be overcome to allow transit-oriented development on the surface parking lots at the station. Such development would not begin until at least the mid-2030s.
