= Dorothy Dugger =

Mass transportation specialist

Dorothy W. Dugger

General Manager of the Bay Area Rapid Transit system
- In office August 23, 2007 – April 22, 2011
- Preceded by: Thomas Margro (1996 – 2007)
- Succeeded by: Grace Crunican (2011 – 2019)

Dorothy W. Dugger is a mass transportation specialist who worked for the San Francisco Bay Area Rapid Transit (BART) district from 1992 to 2011, spending the last four years as BART's first female general manager.

== Early life and education ==
Dugger was born and raised in Alabama on a chicken farm.

Dugger earned a bachelor's degree from Rutgers University in New Jersey in 1973. She also attended a program for senior executives in State and Local Government at Harvard University's John F. Kennedy School of Government.

== Career ==
=== Before BART (1970s to 1992) ===
Dugger served as a legislative director for the American Civil Liberties Union.

From 1982 to 1992, Dugger worked at the Port Authority of New York and New Jersey in a variety of roles. Her role just before leaving for BART was Director of Government and Community Affairs. In an interview in 2008, Dugger credited Sig Frigand for mentoring her during her ten years at the Port Authority of New York and New Jersey.

=== BART (1992–2011) ===
Dugger joined BART in September 1992 as executive manager of external affairs. On April 6, 1994, she was promoted to Deputy General Manager, in recognition of her skills and expertise. She initially served under general manager Richard A. White from 1994 to 1996, and then under general manager Thomas Margro from 1996 to 2007.

Effective June 29, 2007, Thomas Margro retired from the position of general manager, and Dugger became the interim general manager while the board deliberated on who Margro's successor should be.

The two candidates considered by the board for the general manager position were Dugger and Beverly Scott, a black female who was running the Sacramento Regional Transit District at the time. The board voted on Thursday, August 23, 2007, and Dugger won the vote 6-3, with Directors Gail Murray, Joel Keller, Bob Franklin, Zoyd Luce, Thomas Blalock and James Fang voting for her, and Directors Lynette Sweet, Carole Ward Allen, and Tom Radulovich voting against her. The selection of Dugger was attributed to a preference for a candidate with deep inside knowledge of and experience with BART and Bay Area politics. Dugger was also the preferred choice of Sue Angeli, who heads a union representing BART's professional employees. Dugger transitioned from interim general manager to general manager on August 23.

While General Manager, Dugger managed to make BART turn a surplus through a combination of labor concessions, salary freezes, and fare increases. However, her tenure as general manager also included the shooting of Oscar Grant, and her handling of the situation would be the subject of criticism. Dugger also lost $70 million in federal funds for the Oakland Airport Connector.

=== Departure from BART and subsequent controversy ===
On Thursday, February 10, 2011, the BART Board of Directors held a vote at a board meeting where they voted 5-4 to fire Dugger, and then asked her to resign. The San Francisco Chronicle reported unattributed sources as saying that President Bob Franklin and directors Tom Radulovich, James Fang, John McPartland, and Robert Raburn voted to terminate Dugger, whereas Joel Keller, Lynette Sweet, Thomas Blalock, and Gail Murray opposed the termination. However, discussion of Dugger's resignation was not included in the board meeting agenda, which violated the Brown Act. Board member Joel Keller, who opposed forcing Dugger to resign, brought in district counsel Matthew Burrows to examine the legality of the vote, and Burrows agreed that the vote was illegal. The Board later admitted to the illegality of the vote.

The main reasons cited by board members who wanted to get rid of Dugger were her poor communication skills, bad interactions with the board, poor handling of the shooting of Oscar Grant, and loss of federal funding for the Oakland Airport Connector. However, Lynette Sweet, a board member who had voted against Dugger when selecting the general manager in 2007, said that the board decision was puzzling considering Dugger's achievement of making BART achieve a surplus.

On April 13, 2011, BART announced that Dugger was quitting as general manager, with extra compensation of $958,000 (severance of $600,000 and extra compensation of $350,000 for a smooth transition), and BART was beginning the search for a replacement. Dugger's last day at work would be April 22, 2011. On August 31, 2011, Grace Crunican, who had previously headed the Seattle Department of Transportation, became the next general manager of BART.

In 2013, it was reported that in addition to her severance package, Dugger had continued to receive money from BART to compensate for unused sick leave during her 19 years of working for BART, and that, as a result, Dugger was BART's highest paid employee in 2012 despite not working for BART. Responding to concerns raised about this, Grace Crunican, the new BART General Manager, said that the policy deserved review, but also defended the policy by noting that allowing people to accumulate vacation time for later could incentivize them to work harder while at the helm.

== Personal life ==
While she worked at BART, Dugger lived in the Grand Lake District in Oakland, California with her husband Lou. Since her office was near 19th Street Oakland station, the closest BART station to her home, she did not take BART to commute to work, but she frequently used BART for meetings in San Francisco and to check out the condition in trains. She identified not having children as one of her biggest regrets.
