= Richard A. White =

American public transportation official

General Manager of the Bay Area Rapid Transit system
- In office April 1994 – July 26, 2007
- Preceded by: Frank Wilson (1989 – 1994)
- Succeeded by: Thomas Margro (1996 – 2007)

General Manager of Washington Metropolitan Area Transit Authority
- In office 1996 – January 11, 2006
- Preceded by: Lawrence G. Reuter
- Succeeded by: Dan Tangherlini

Richard A. White is an American public transportation official who was the CEO and general manager of the Washington Metropolitan Area Transit Authority during 1996–2006. Prior to joining WMATA as CEO, he was the general manager at Bay Area Rapid Transit in the San Francisco area. White also spent six years with the federal Urban Mass Transit Administration, which is now the Federal Transit Administration. White is from Massachusetts.

== Career ==
=== New Jersey Transit ===
From 1981 to 1991, White worked for New Jersey Transit.

=== BART ===
In 1991, White was hired as BART's deputy general manager under Frank Wilson. In April 1994, he became the General Manager of BART after Wilson was appointed Secretary of Transportation for the state of New Jersey. Dorothy Dugger succeeded White as Deputy General Manager.

When White left BART, his annual salary was about $141,000 per year, not including benefits that increased his total compensation per year to about $180,000.

White inherited an agency with fractious labor relations. Union officials often criticized White's predecessor, Frank Wilson, as autocratic, arrogant, and distrustful of the rank-and-file.

Just months after he assumed the helm in 1994, union members threatened to strike. Governor Pete Wilson imposed a 30-day cooling-off period in July, and the period was later extended to sixty days by a Contra Costa County Superior Court order. Management and members of the unions, which included the Service Employees International Union Local 790 and the Amalgamated Transit Union Local 1555, disagreed over a proposed contract provision that would have allowed management to transfer workers anywhere within the system. The two sides also disagreed over pay provisions.

During the dispute White revealed his temper in public: "BART's top administrator yesterday angrily told union negotiators, 'It's time for a reality check.'" White asserted that "The issue is money" and that the members of ATU Local 1555 were engaged in "a campaign of misinformation and a lack of honesty" designed to make people believe the primary root of the dispute was work rules. "We have been as flexible and creative as we can...but this hardly resembles a good faith effort," White said. A strike was averted in late September when workers approved new contracts. The handling of the negotiations by SEIU Local 790 director Paul Varacalli met with mixed responses from BART workers, with some praise for him getting a good deal for workers, and some criticism for major givebacks to BART management.

White pushed through a three-year, 45-percent fare increase, the largest cumulative increase in the agency's history. The increase was part of a 10-year, $1-billion renovation program that included restoration of BART's original fleet and major improvements to stations, ticket machines, lighting and communications equipment. White was also a proponent of the BART SFO extension (extending BART to the San Francisco International Airport station and Millbrae Intermodal Terminal), which would be completed in 2003 under his successor Thomas Margro.

On June 1, 1996, it was announced that White was leaving BART to become general manager of the Washington Metropolitan Area Transit Authority, with July 26 being his last day at BART. Potential successor candidates mentioned at the time of his departure were Deputy General Manager Dorothy Dugger (who would become General Manager in 2007), Jim Gallagher (assistant general manager of operations), Larry Williams (assistant general manager of operations), and John Haley (former deputy general manager at BART, at the time deputy general manager of the port authority in New York). White was succeeded by Thomas Margro who began as General Manager on September 30, 1996.

=== WMATA ===
White became general manager at the Washington Metropolitan Area Transit Authority after Lawrence G. Reuter left to take the top job at the MTA New York City transit system. White was chosen from a field of over 60 candidates, and three other finalists, when he became general manager at WMATA. WMATA was a much larger agency than BART: when White assumed the job, WMATA had over 7,000 employees and a $750 million operating budget. In contrast, BART had about 3,000 workers and a $270 million budget. When WMATA hired White, his total compensation was about $200,000 per year.

A string of incidents in 2004–2005 and complaints of mismanagement at WMATA, however, eventually led to his dismissal on January 11, 2006. White stepped down on February 16, 2006, and was replaced by Dan Tangherlini, as interim CEO.
