= Grace Crunican =

American public transit manager (born 1955)

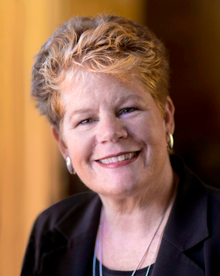
- Crunican circa 2015

General Manager of the Bay Area Rapid Transit system
- In office August 31, 2011 – July 6, 2019
- Preceded by: Dorothy Dugger (2007 – 2011)
- Succeeded by: Robert "Bob" Powers (2019 – present)

Director, Oregon Department of Transportation
- In office May 1996 – February 2001

Deputy Administrator of the Federal Transit Administration
- In office 1993–1996
- President: Bill Clinton

Personal details
- Born: 1955 (age 70–71) Beaverton, Oregon, U.S.
- Education: Gonzaga University; Willamette University (M.B.A.)

Grace Crunican (born 1955) is a mass transportation specialist who most recently served as general manager of the San Francisco Bay Area Rapid Transit (BART) District. She had previously worked for the Oregon Department of Transportation, the Federal Transit Administration (under the Clinton administration), and the Seattle Department of Transportation, and also at the mass transit lobbying organization called the Surface Transportation Policy Project.

== Early life and education ==
Crunican was born in Beaverton, Oregon, to Marcus Saunders Crunican and Cora Lee Cunningham in 1955. She has a B.A. from Gonzaga University and an MBA from Willamette University.

== Career ==
=== Early career ===
Crunican began her career in policy in the 1970s in Washington, D.C.

Her first transportation-related appointment was in 1979 to the Presidential Management Intern Program (now Presidential Management Fellows Program) for the U.S. Department of Transportation. She then served as a Professional Staffer for the Senate Transportation Appropriations Subcommittee. Among other things, she managed TriMet's request for a vintage trolley and downtown street additions in the Portland metropolitan area, Oregon.

Crunican then went on to become Deputy Director and Capitol Project Manager at the Portland Bureau of Transportation, where she is credited with increasing dedicated transportation funding from 23% to 55%.

After working at the Portland Bureau of Transportation, Crunican became the director of the Surface Transportation Policy Project, a nonprofit coalition dedicated to implementing the Intermodal Surface Transportation Efficiency Act of 1991.

=== Federal Transit Administration ===
Crunican served as Deputy Administrator at the Federal Transit Administration (united the United States Department of Transportation) from 1993 to 1996, under the presidency of Bill Clinton. While in that role, Crunican negotiated 13 New Start Rail projects worth $3 billion. She also testified twice to the Railroad Safety Committee while in the role.

=== Oregon Department of Transportation ===
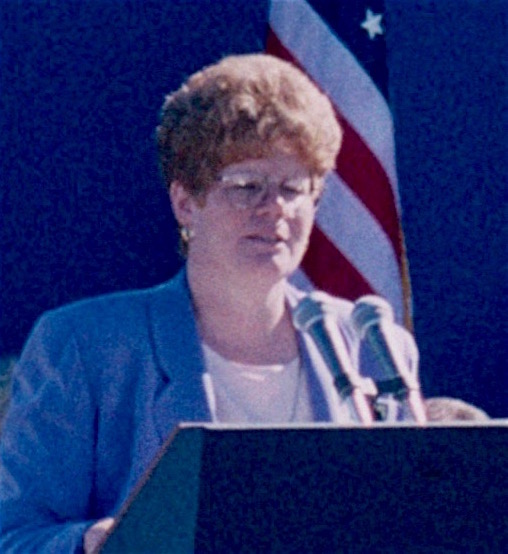
Crunican at a MAX light rail line opening in Oregon in 1998

Crunican began serving as director of the Oregon Department of Transportation (ODOT) in May 1996 under Governor John Kitzhaber, and was the first female to serve in that role.

In 1999, as ODOT Director, Crunican ordered the formation of "Project Time Team" to cut turnaround time for highway construction projects to 18 months between acceptance of project by city/county and release of advertising for contractor bids.

Crunican announced her resignation abruptly in January 2001. Her salary at the time of resignation was $118,000. Crunican's resignation came on the heels of two other state agency director resignations, but a spokesman for Governor John Kitzhaber said that the spate of resignations was coincidental and not part of a purge. Crunican's work was praised by Republican state representative Bruce Starr, of Aloha, who expressed surprise at her resignation, as well as by Gary George, the Senate Transportation Committee chairman who had previously been critical of ODOT. Her resignation was effective February 28, 2001.

=== Seattle Department of Transportation ===
Crunican began serving as the director of the Seattle Department of Transportation in 2002, becoming the second person to serve in that role. The Seattle Department of Transportation had been created in 1997 with the name Seattle Transportation Department, and Crunican replaced outgoing director Daryl Grigsby. While there, Crunican implemented Bridging the Gap (a transportation maintenance levy) and the Transit Master Plan (Seattle Connections, Bike Master Plan, Freight Mobility Strategic Plan, and Pedestrian Master Plan), the latter with the goal of helping Seattle achieve the U.S. Kyoto Protocol goals.

In 2008, due to a series of heavy snowstorms, Seattle's transportation was paralyzed for a few days, and Crunican's inadequate response to the snowstorm was criticized. Among other things, her decision to use sand instead of salt to clear out the accumulated snow (to limit environmental damage to the Bay) was implicated as a reason for the snow not being cleared out quickly enough. Crunican was also criticized for going on vacation while the snow had not cleared out, and for failing to take responsibility and lacking a customer service mindset.

Despite considerable dissatisfaction at Crunican, Mayor Greg Nickels refused to fire her, citing her overall positive track record including her work on Bridging the Gap, a sentiment echoed by other Crunican supporters, and one he would continue to voice over the years. However, shortly after the mayor's job was turned over to Mike McGinn, Crunican announced on December 28, 2009 that she was resigning and would start her own consulting company.

At the time of Crunican's resignation from SDOT, it was reported that Crunican was a finalist for a county administrator job in Clackamas County, Oregon. However, she did not get the job.

=== Bay Area Rapid Transit ===
Crunican was general manager for the Bay Area Rapid Transit (BART) District. BART is a rail-based mass transit system serving the San Francisco Bay Area.

On April 13, 2011, BART announced that general manager Dorothy Dugger was quitting with extra compensation of $958,000 (severance of $600,000 and extra compensation of $350,000 for a smooth transition), and BART was beginning the search for a replacement. Dugger's last day at work would be April 22, 2011.

In early August, the San Francisco Chronicle reported that BART had almost finalized on Grace Crunican as the general manager. Board member Lynette Sweet said that during the interview, Crunican impressed the board by identifying things that the board was doing wrong. Of the board directors, only one, James Fang, voted against her, saying he was unsure whether she knew enough about BART.

Crunican was formally appointed as general manager on August 31, 2011. Her initial salary was $300,000. Crunican got a $20,000 raise in annual salary six months later.

Crunican's first major challenge was labor union strikes as well as deaths that occurred on the tracks due to a train run by a substitute worker during the strikes. Crunican pushed back against union demands noting that the money comes from fares and taxpayers, whose interests also need to be protected, but she received criticism for excessive executive compensation.

Crunican oversaw replacement of the BART train seats to vinyl ones that were more hygienic and easy to clean, and the award of a contract to Bombardier Transportation in 2012 for the delivery of new train cars. During her tenure, BART opened the Oakland International Airport station and Warm Springs/South Fremont station.

One of the factors in deciding to hire Crunican was her skill at securing external grants and other funding, later validated by her subsequent success at getting Metropolitan Transportation Commission funding for the BART train car upgrade, and the passage of Measure RR, giving BART $3.5 billion in infrastructure funds.

On April 11, 2019, Crunican announced her retirement from BART effective July 6, 2019.

== Personal life ==
Crunican is single and has had two adopted children, from Russia respectively. She lives in Alameda, California.
