= American Public Transportation Association =

Non-profit advocacy group in the United States

- Founded: 1882 (as the American Street Railway Association)
- Purpose: To strengthen and improve public transportation in North America
- Headquarters: 1300 I St NW, Suite 1200 East; Washington, D.C., U.S.
- Region served: North America
- Key people: Paul Skoutelas (President & CEO)
- Subsidiaries: American Public Transportation Foundation
- Website: www.apta.com
- Formerly called: American Street Railway Association (1882–1905); American Street and Interurban Railway Association (1905–1910); American Electric Railway Association (1910–1932); American Transit Association (1932–1974); American Public Transit Association (1974–2000) due to the merger of American Transit Association and Institute for Rapid Transit in 1974

The American Public Transportation Association (APTA) is a nonprofit group of approximately 1,500 public and private sector member organizations that promotes and advocates for the interests of the public transportation industry in the United States.

APTA represents all modes of public transportation, including bus, paratransit, light rail, commuter rail, subways, waterborne services, and intercity and high-speed passenger rail. More than 90 percent of the people using public transportation in the United States ride on APTA member systems.

APTA's membership consists of more than 320 public transit agencies, as well as transportation-related businesses and organizations. Members are engaged in every aspect of the industry – from planning, designing, financing, constructing and operating transit systems to the research, development, manufacturing and maintenance of vehicles, equipment and transit-related products and services. Additionally, academic institutions, transportation network companies, transit associations and state departments of transportation are APTA members.

== Leadership and governance ==
Paul Skoutelas was elected by the APTA Board of Directors in November 2017 and became president and chief executive officer in January 2018. He has spent more than 40 years in public and private sector positions related to public transportation. He was CEO of public transit systems in Pittsburgh and Orlando and as senior vice president for WSP USA, one of the world's largest architectural and engineering firms. Skoutelas has also held leadership positions on numerous boards and committees for transportation organizations, including on APTA's Board of Directors and Executive Committee, the Transportation Research Board, National Transit Institute, Pennsylvania Transportation Institute, and the Transit Cooperative Research Program.

The APTA Board of Directors is the 112-member governing body of the association. The individuals that preside on the APTA Board of Directors are elected and appointed by APTA members to oversee the management of the association. Elections are held each fall during APTA's annual business meeting, and nominations typically open in June of each year.

APTA's Executive Committee is composed of 25 individuals who are elected by APTA members to make recommendations to the Board of Directors and to make decisions on behalf of the Board on specific matters.

== Activities ==
- Advocating for increased federal funding as well as on policy, legislative and regulatory issues is one of APTA's most important functions. The association supports investment in public transportation infrastructure that models smart growth and creates jobs, produces safe, efficient transportation, reduces congestion and pollution, connects people to jobs, and provides access to opportunities such as health care, education, social services and commerce. In 2015, APTA played a key role in the passage of the FAST Act, which provided predictable and reliable multi-year funding for public transportation and passenger rail programs over five years (2016-2020). The association also maintains a 220,000-member grassroots advocacy effort called "Voices for Public Transit."
- Since 1943, APTA has been publishing its annual Public Transportation Fact Book (formerly known as the Transit Fact Book), a compendium of industry facts and data.
- APTA frequently works in partnership with The National Alliance for Public Transportation Advocates (NAPTA), Center for Transportation Excellence (CFTE), Transit Cooperative Research Program (TCRP) and Transportation Research Board (TRB), all of which share a common goal of developing practical solutions to mobility challenges.
- The association also maintains relationships and plans study missions with international public transportation groups, including the Canadian Urban Transit Association, UITP (Union Internationale des Transports Publics or International Association of Public Transport), and GIE Objectif Transport Public.
- APTA's Policy Development and Research Program serves as the association's think tank, conducting original research through polling, surveys and in-depth studies and publishing reports on priorities issues for the industry.
- APTA plans and organizes more than 14 conferences, workshops and seminars every year, the largest of which is the Annual Meeting. Every three years, the association holds an international exposition called APTA EXPO, the world's largest trade show for the public transportation industry. Annual events include the International Bus Roadeo and Conference, International Rail Rodeo and Conference, Legislative Conference, and safety and security awards in excellence. In 2018, the association held its first "The Future of Mobility Summit" to explore how changes in technology, business models and customer preferences are transforming the public transportation sector and creating opportunities for a variety of integrated mobility services.
- Professional and workforce development are key APTA activities. Under the brand APTA-U, the association offers classroom and online education and training programs for senior executives, emerging leaders and front-line managers. APTA-U is exploring credentialing and certifications to help prepare a high-skilled workforce.
- APTA conducts peer reviews and safety audits to assist its members with critical challenges. The association also works with the Federal Transit Administration (FTA), Federal Railroad Administration (FRA) and Transportation Safety Board (TSB) to develop industry standards on a range of issues.
- In addition to its Fact Book and research reports, APTA publishes a biweekly print and digital news magazine, called Passenger Transport as well as a biweekly electronic version called Passenger Transport Express.

== History ==
The organization that would eventually become known as APTA was first established as the American Street Railway Association on December 13, 1882, in Boston, Massachusetts. The initial meetings focused on the price of oats for the horses that pulled transit vehicles, but that focus evolved as more transit companies built electric systems.

In 1905, the group met in New York and reorganized as the American Street and Interurban Railway Transportation and Traffic Association. To encompass even more modes of electric transit, the group changed its name to the American Electric Railway Transportation and Traffic Association in 1910. By 1932, many of the transit systems relied on motor coaches and trolleys in addition to electric streetcars, so the organization became known as the American Transit Association (ATA).

In 1966, ATA relocated from New York City to Washington, D.C., because of increasing reliance on federal funding, especially with the passage of the Urban Mass Transportation Act in 1964 and the creation of the Urban Mass Transportation Administration (now the Federal Transit Administration). In the 1970s, the organization developed a closer working relationship with the federal government as more and more transit systems became publicly financed. The American Public Transit Association (APTA) was created in 1974 when the American Transit Association and the Institute for Rapid Transit (IRT) merged. The IRT dated back to 1929 and formally organized on June 7, 1961. In 1976, the Transit Development Corporation also merged with APTA.

In January 2000. the name of the organization was changed to the American Public Transportation Association. Despite the various name changes, the mission of the organization has remained generally the same.

== Committees ==
APTA has more than 135 subject-matter committees and subcommittee that address issues of interest to the public transportation industry and develop strategies, solutions, policies and programs. The committee structure encourages interaction and information-sharing among APTA members in a wide range of disciplines.

=== Legislative Committee ===
APTA's Legislative Committee is the primary body that develops consensus recommendations about federal legislative activity, including transit authorizations, annual appropriations, Administration initiatives and regulatory matters. Working with its seven subcommittees that specialize in related areas, the Legislative Committee formulates recommendations that are considered by the APTA Executive Committee and the APTA Board of Directors.

=== Other committees and subcommittees ===
- Bus and Paratransit Operations
- Commuter and Intercity Rail
  - Commuter Rail Committee
  - High-Speed and Intercity Passenger Rail Committee
- Government Affairs
  - Planning, Policy and Program Development Steering Committee
  - Environmental Justice/Title VI Subcommittee
- Management and Finance
- Marketing and Communications
- Policy
  - Sustainability Committee
- Rail Transit
- Research and Technology
- Small Operations
- State Affairs
- Transit Board Members

== Campaigns ==
=== Where Public Transportation Goes, Community Grows Campaign ===
APTA's advocacy, outreach and education campaign titled "Where Public Transportation Goes, Community Grows" was designed to promote benefits of public transportation by highlighting the industry's impact on economic development, sustainability and improving a higher quality of life in communities.

== See also ==
- Henry Clay Payne, railroad lobbyist and president of American Street Railway Association
- B. R. Stokes, the first Executive Director of APTA, who served in that capacity from 1974 to 1980
