= Killing of Angelo Quinto =

2020 murder in Antioch, California, U.S.

- Date: December 26, 2020
- Location: Antioch, California, U.S.; 37.9821443°N 121.8027333°W
- Deaths: 1

Angelo Quinto (March 10, 1990 – December 26, 2020) was a 30-year-old Filipino-American Navy veteran who died on December 26, 2020, from complications after being knelt on the neck by a police officer three days earlier. Prior to the encounter, police were responding to a call that Quinto was suffering from a mental health crisis. On February 18, 2021, Quinto's family and their lawyer, John Burris, filed a complaint against the Antioch Police Department.

== Background ==
Born in the Philippines, Angelo Quinto immigrated to the United States. He graduated from Berkeley High School and attended classes at Berkeley City College. In his twenties, he joined the U.S. Navy but was discharged in 2019, due to a food allergy. In an interview with police following the incident, Quinto's sister Isabella "Bella" Collins said that he showed signs of depression for most of his life, though he was never diagnosed, and that his behavior changed after an assault a year earlier, which left him a black eye, stitches in his head and memory loss.

== Incident and death ==
On December 23, 2020, Bella Collins called 911 reporting suspicious behavior and possible paranoia and anxiety in Angelo, who had grabbed her and their mother, Maria Cassandra Quinto-Collins, hugging them tightly; his sister feared he might hurt their mother. Shortly after 11 p.m., police arrived and grabbed Quinto from Cassandra, who reports that as they put him down on his stomach and handcuffed him, he repeatedly said, "Please don't kill me." When Quinto lost consciousness, Cassandra began recording a video of the incident on her cell phone in which blood is seen on Quinto's face and on the floor. The police removed his handcuffs and rolled him into a mobile stretcher, then attempted to resuscitate him through CPR. Officers called an ambulance, and Quinto was taken to the Sutter Delta Medical Center, where he died three days later.

== Investigation and legal proceedings ==
Quinto's family filed a wrongful death claim with civil rights attorney John Burris on February 18, 2021. It is stated in the claim that Angelo had been "suffering from anxiety, depression, and paranoia for the previous few months" and that before police arrived, "he had already started to calm down". The police denied using excessive force. A county pathologist stated at the coroner's inquest that Modafinil, which is used to treat narcolepsy, was found in Quinto's system, and said the cause of death was excited delirium syndrome. An autopsy ordered by Quinto's family determined he died from asphyxiation.

=== Lawsuit settlement ===
On May 16, 2024, the Antioch City Council led by Mayor (at-large) Lamar Thorpe approved the $7.5-million settlement based on a Quinto Family lawsuit. The councillors noted the advice of the California Affiliated Risk Management Authority, insurance authorities and the Municipal Pooling Authority.

== Aftermath ==
A rally was held at the Antioch Police Department on June 23, 2021.

On September 30, 2021, California Governor Gavin Newsom signed eight police reform bills into law. One of them, Assembly Bill 490 or Angelo's Law, bans restraint tactics and face-down holds that could cause asphyxiation.

On October 10, 2023, Newsom also signed a bill prohibiting excited delirium as a valid diagnosis or cause of death.

== See also ==
- Murder of George Floyd
- Killing of Tony Timpa
- Killing of Christian Hall, which occurred four days after Quinto died
