= TriDelta =

TriDelta may refer to:

- TriDelta Transit, a California transit agency
- Delta Delta Delta, a United States collegiate sorority
