= Isola delle Femmine =

- Comune
- Comune di Isola delle Femmine
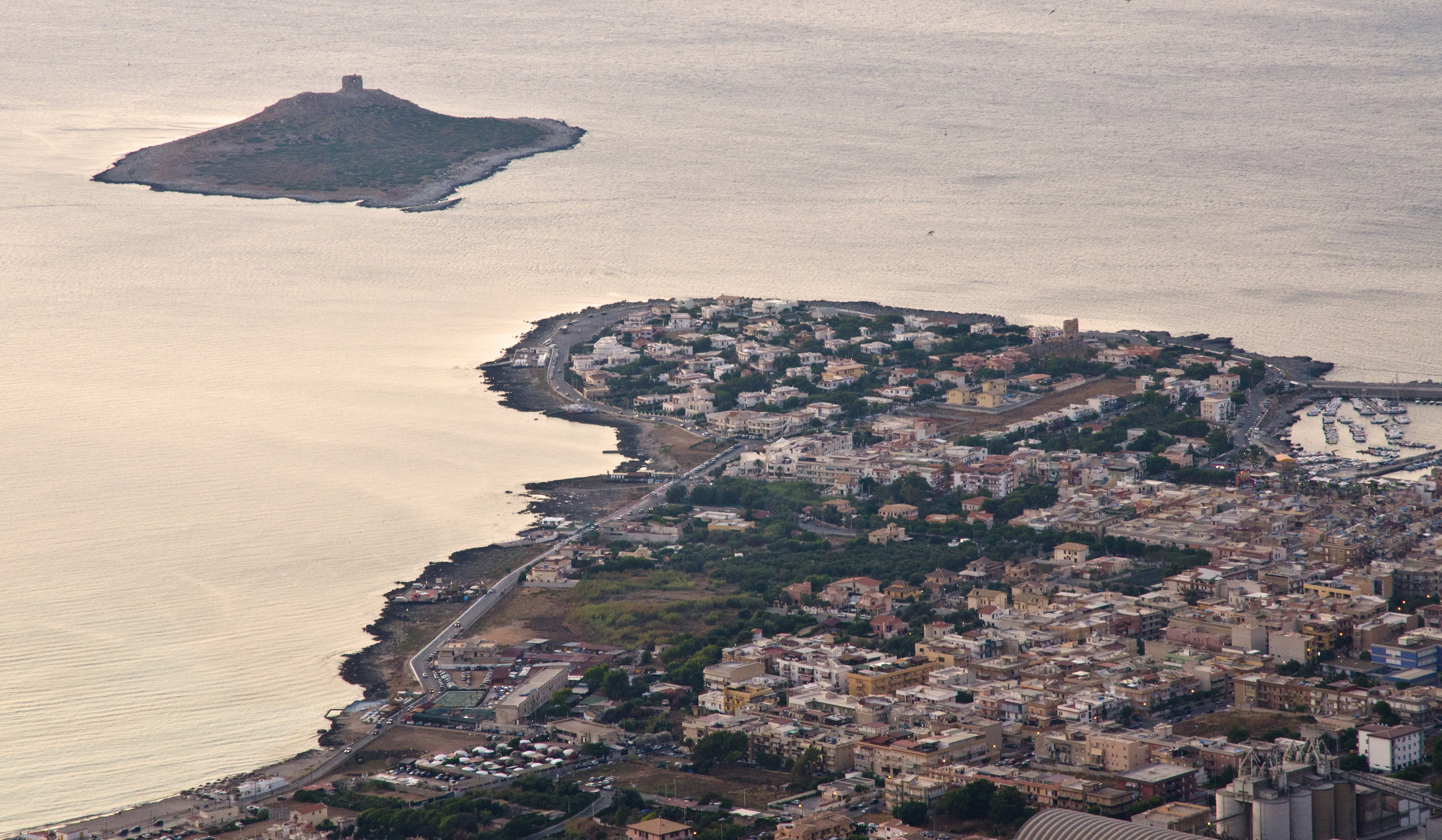

- Coat of arms

- Location within Italy Location within Sicily
- Coordinates: 38°11′50″N 13°14′50″E
- Country: Italy
- Region: Sicily
- Metropolitan city: Palermo (PA)

Government
  - Mayor: Orazio Nevoloso (lista civica)

Area
  - Total: 3 km^{2} (1.2 sq mi)
- Elevation: 7 m (23 ft)

Population (31 December 2010)
  - Total: 7,336
  - Density: 2,400/km^{2} (6,300/sq mi)
- Demonym: Isolani
- Time zone: UTC+1 (CET)
  - Summer (DST): UTC+2 (CEST)
- Postal code: 90040
- Dialing code: 091
- Patron saint: Our Lady of the Graces (SS. Maria delle Grazie)
- Saint day: July 2
- Website: Official website

Isola delle Femmine (Sicilian: Isula dî Fìmmini) is an Italian town in northwestern Sicily, administratively part of the Metropolitan City of Palermo.

Despite its name, which can be translated in English as "The Island of Females", the town is located in mainland Sicily. The name of the town was chosen after the name of the small island that sits just off shore from it when it became an independent municipality from the neighboring city of Capaci in 1854. The reason for this choice of name was a natural one based upon the combined history of the town and the island, a history that also explains the origin of the Island’s name.

== Origin of the city's name ==
The etymology of the name is based partly in legend and partly in fact. One legend concerns a letter Pliny the Younger is said to have written to Emperor Trajan describing a prison for women that he saw on the island. There are no reports of artifacts of a prison on the island, in spite of the fact that cisterns dating to the Carthaginian period, 100–200 years before Pliny's letter, have been found and still exist along with supporting documentation. The cisterns were used to ferment mixtures of fish scraps, spices, and oils into a sauce called garum, which was highly-prized in the Roman era. Finding such a letter would give credence to the legend but not finding such a letter would not disprove it because the letter might be one that did not survive. The legend of a prison appears to have given rise to many variations, possibly the most imaginative being a story that thirteen Turkish maidens, condemned for serious crimes, were set adrift at sea by relatives only to be shipwrecked on this small rocky island where they lived alone for seven years before they were found by their relatives, having had a change of heart. None of these similar legends are supported by any documentation or artifacts on the island.

There is another legend that the island was used as a refuge for women and children when a serious disease spread through the village so as to prevent them from being afflicted by the illness. The source of this legend is not known, but again there are no reports of artifacts of living quarters for such a refuge, and any such use of the island at that date should have been well documented.

A better documented legend relates to Euphemius. One version has him as the Byzantine governor of the province of Palermo while another claims that he was an admiral who killed the governor and declared himself emperor of Sicily. In the latter version, Michael II sent troops to retake the island. Euphemius then invited Muslims from North Africa to help him battle the emperor’s troops. Euphemius was killed in battle, but the Muslims remained to occupy Sicily for two centuries. What this has to do with Isola delle Femmine is not explained, but if it was referred to as "island of Euphemius", this would have been in Latin insula Euphemii. Then conjecture is that this gradually evolved to "insula Femi", then "insula Fimi", then "Isula di Fimmini", then "Isola delle Femmine". It does seem clear that the people of the area remember parts of this legend, as evidenced by "Lungomare Eufemio" street and a Hotel Eufemia are located in Isola delle Femmine. There was even a soccer team called Eufemia.

Another possible origin of the name starts with the fact that a structure called a tonnara (derived from the Italian "tonno", meaning "tuna") was built, connecting Isola delle Femmine to the small island across from it. A large net was stretched between them in order to catch Bluefin tuna that normally passed through the passageway. Some traces of these tonnaras remain on the mainland. The date of its construction is not known, but it existed during the Norman rule of Sicily (1061 to 1189) and likely was built during the Moslem rule (902 to 1061). Legend has it that this tonnara was given the Arabic name for "mouth" or "entrance" which is pronounced as one would pronounce an English word written as "fim". "Fim" was Latinized into "fimis" and then into "fimi".

In 1176, William II of Sicily granted large amounts of land to the Abbey at Monreale. This grant was contained in a decree document that not only included statements listing the properties granted to the Abbey but also specified rights and privileges granted for use of the properties. It also included the statement: "... cum omnibus iusticis et pertinentiis suis eidem onasterio concedimus et donamus tunnarium quoque quae est in insula quae dicitur Fimi prope Portum Gali". Translated into English, it reads: "... with all the responsibilities and appurtenances, to the monastery is granted and donated the tonnara which is on the island called Fimi, near the Port of Galus...". With this decree, William gave Theobaldus, Bishop of Monreale (who had built a monastery there in 1174), this tonnara and it referred to the island by the name "Fimi". The edict is housed in the Tabularium of Monreale Cathedral. All this was later reaffirmed by an ecclesiastical bulletin of the Archdiocese of Monreale in 1912 which repeated that the decree of 1176 included the tonnara stating that it was located on the island named "Fimi" and went on to describe the location of the island with modern names of landmarks in its vicinity. Therefore, by the 12th century, the name of the little island was acknowledged to be "Fimi". In Sicilian, the word for women is "fimmini", as stated above. Then, it is quite possible for "Fimi" to evolve to "Fimmini", and "insula Fimi" to "insula Fimmini", then to "Isula di Fimmini" in Sicilian, then to "Isola delle Femmine" in Italian rather than Sicilian. In the 12th century, Sicily was very multi-lingual. The court language was thought to be Norman-French but official documents, especially those dealing with the Church were written in Latin as demonstrated by the decree of 1176 discussed above. The Norman rulers relied mostly on the local Sicilian population, who initially spoke Arabic, Latin and Greek, for administrative and artisan work, but forms of Sicilian were already evolving. It rose to the level of a literary language with the Sicilian School (1230–1266) founded by Frederick II, the last heir to the Norman crown, and continued to be Sicily’s dominate language until well past the unification of Sicily with the Kingdom of Italy in 1861.

The record then of the island being called "Fimi" in the 12th century is well established. The exact origin of that name relies on legend. Either the path from Euphemius or the path from the Arabic word for mouth could have led to Fimi with the Arabic path more likely given the documented existence of the Tonnara. How Fimi evolved into Femmine relies on likely language evolution as the several root languages evolved into Sicilian and then the accepted Italian language. Neither of the possible origins for "Fimi" nor the evolutionary language path to "Femmine" associates the origin of the name of the island and then the name of the town with women. Further, it was quite natural for the town, which had been referred to as Tonnara prior to it being an independent municipality, to adopt the name Isola delle Femmine given the historical ties of the ancient tonnara, the island and the town.

== Connections to California ==
Due to economic conditions in the late 19th and early 20th centuries, large numbers of Italians emigrated to the United States, and California in particular. Those from Isola delle Femmine found three California cities attractive due to the prospects of commercial fishing and a climate closely resembling that of Isola delle Femmine. This started with immigration to Pittsburg, California followed by Martinez and later Monterey. This immigration continued throughout the 20th century. The parents of baseball players Vince, Joe and Dom DiMaggio were born and raised in Isola delle Femmine.

In commemoration of the ties of Pittsburg’s Sicilian settlers to fishing, a life size bronze Fisherman statue that stands at the Pittsburg Marina at the foot of Railroad Avenue was built with a plaque containing the names of its first Sicilian settlers. In 1992, a sister-city connection was established between these two cities. To commemorate this, a copy of the Fisherman statue now stands in Isola’s Piazza di Pittsburg. Encouraged by these efforts, an organization named Friends of Isola delle Femminewas formed with the purpose to further cultural and educational exchange between the two cities and to promote understanding by future generations of their ancestry. Due to this organization's efforts, Monterey became a sister city in 2017, followed by Martinez in 2019.

== Administration ==
By the "Decreto del Prefetto di Palermo prot. 1508 / 2012 / Area O.S.P. 1^ bis del 16 novembre 2012", the administration was released and a special commission was placed at the government of the Comune because of Mafia's infiltrations.

Special commission was composed by:

- dott. Vincenzo Covato, Vice Prefetto;
- dott.ssa Matilde Mulè, Vice Prefetto Aggiunto;
- dott. Guglielmo Trovato, Dirigente Area Economico Finanziaria.

An extraordinary election was held on November 16 and 17, 2014. The victorious candidate in this election was Stefano Bologna, representing a lista civica.

== Twin towns ==
- (United States) Pittsburg, CA, USA
- (United States) Monterey, CA, USA
- (United States) Martinez, CA, USA
