= CARMA =

CARMA (not to be confused with Karma) may refer to:

- Carma, a transportation technology company (formerly known as Avego), based in Cork, Ireland
- Carma Developers, Canadian residential land developing company
- Carbon Monitoring for Action, part of the Center for Global Development
- Combined Array for Research in Millimeter-wave Astronomy, astronomical instrument composed of 23 radio telescopes
- California Affiliated Risk Management Authority, A California public agency dedicated to innovative approaches in providing financial protection for its public entity members against catastrophic loss
