= Antioch station (BART) =

Rapid transit station in San Francisco Bay Area

Antioch
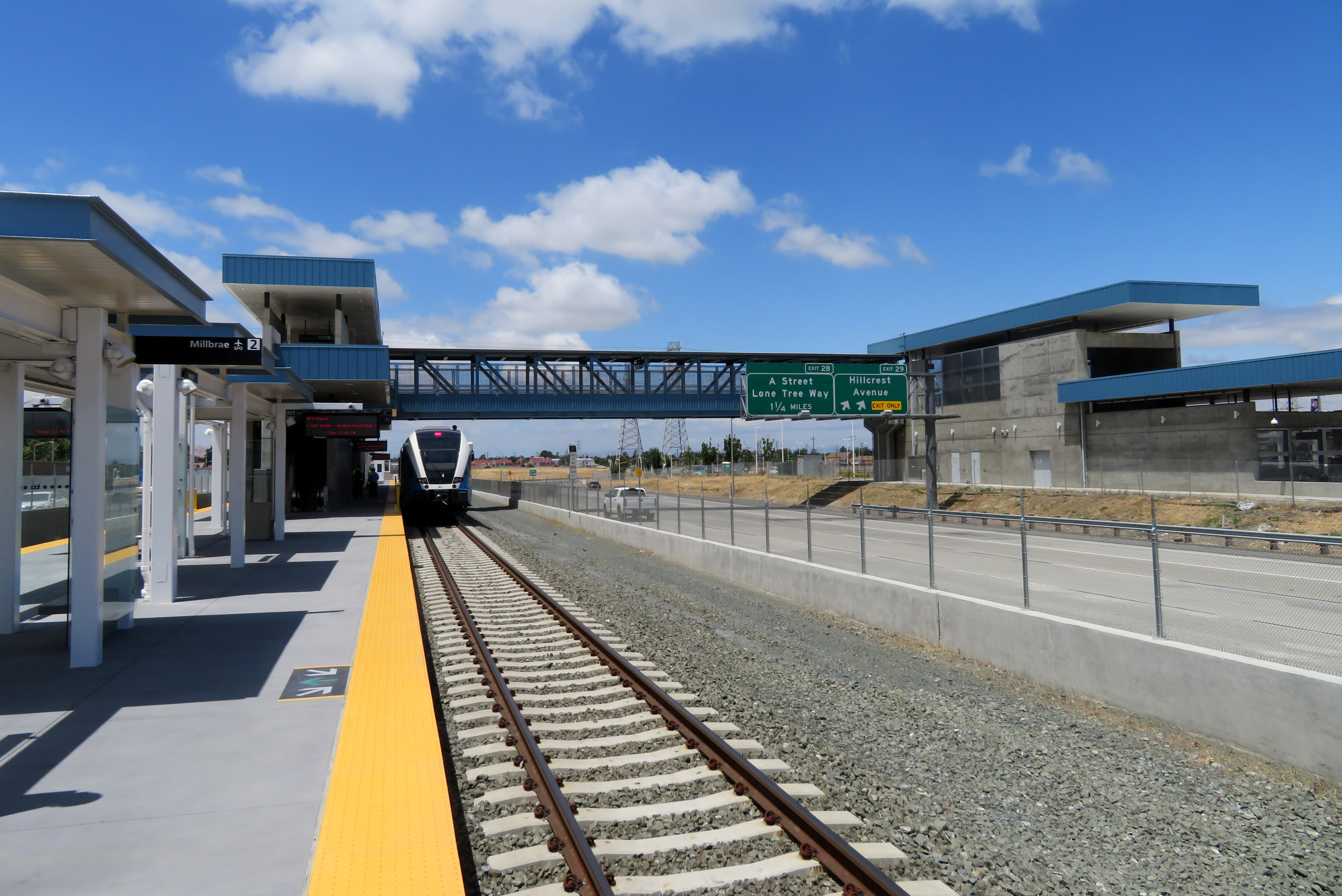
- A train at the station on the first day of service in May 2018

General information
- Location: 1600 Slatten Ranch Road; Antioch, California
- Coordinates: 37.996281°N 121.783404°W
- Line: BART E-Line (eBART)
- Platforms: 1 island platform
- Tracks: 2
- Connections: Tri Delta Transit: 300, 380, 383, 384, 385, 387, 388, 390, 391, 392, 393, 395, 395; County Connection: 93X; Rio Vista Delta Breeze: 52

Construction
- Structure type: At grade
- Parking: 1,012 spaces
- Cycle facilities: Yes
- Accessible: Yes

Other information
- Station code: BART: ANTC

History
- Opened: May 26, 2018

Passengers
- 2026: 2,033 (weekday average)

Services
Preceding station	Bay Area Rapid Transit	Following station
Pittsburg Center toward Millbrae or SFO via Pittsburg/Bay Point	Yellow Line (eBART)	Terminus
Location

Antioch station is a Bay Area Rapid Transit (BART) station on the Yellow Line. It is located in the median of Highway 4 at Hillcrest Avenue in Antioch, California. Antioch station is the eastern terminus of the BART to Antioch (eBART) section of the line.

== History ==
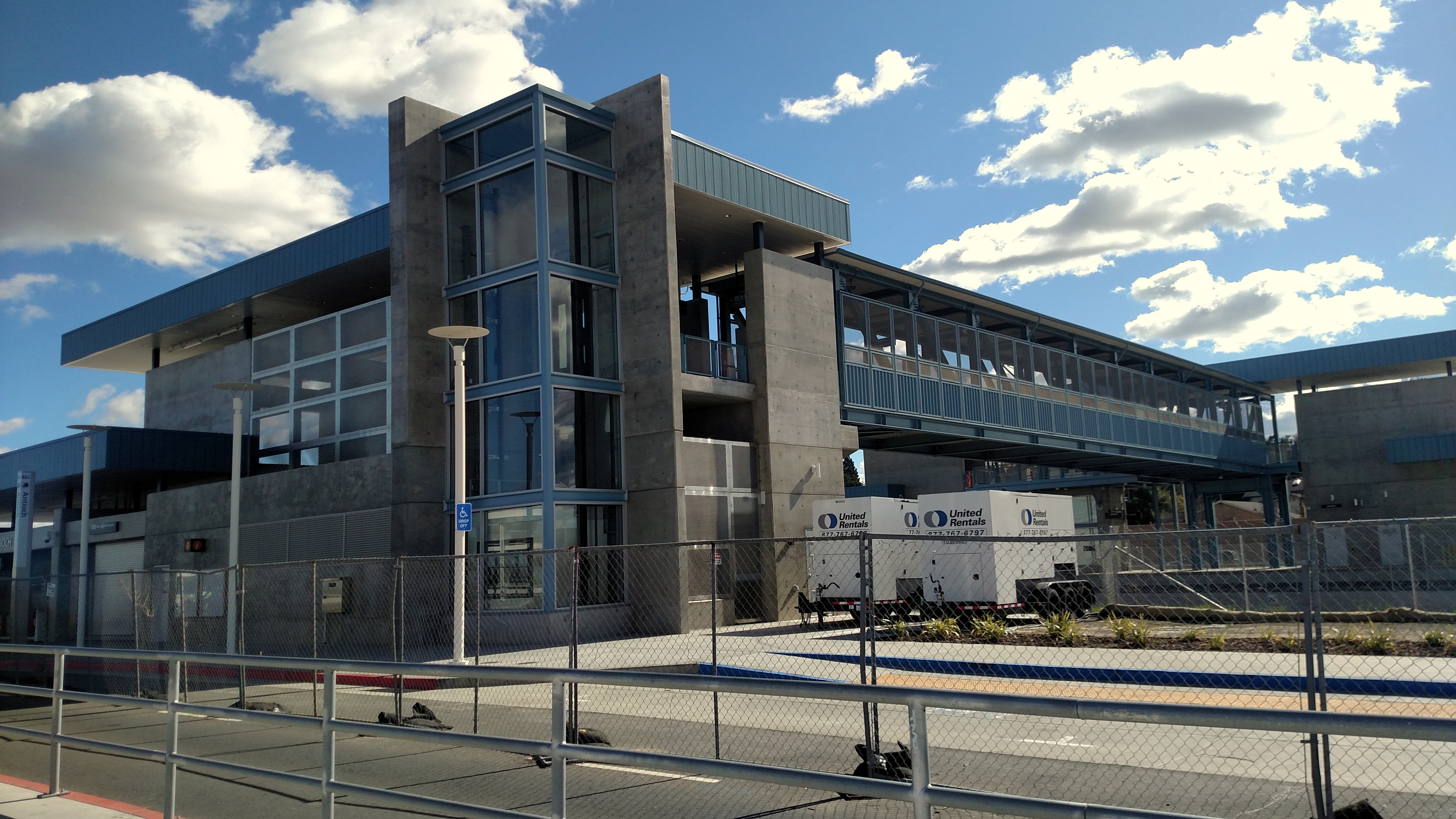
Antioch station nearing completion in February 2018

The station is expected to attract passengers from Oakley, Brentwood, and Discovery Bay, communities that were envisioned as part of the original eBART extension but could not be included due to cost. BART planned to extend service southeast to Brentwood and upgrade the extension to full BART service while pushing the DMU portion further out. Initially planned to open in 2016, the station's service date was delayed until May 26, 2018.

Preliminary designs called for a station without an agent present, nor restrooms or escalators. This prompted concern from the community and the plans were redesigned to add these features, however the station will only have one employee present at any given time, one agent or one maintenance worker at a time. An extra police beat will be added. This caused concern among Antioch residents and the Antioch Police Department may have to cooperatively police the station. The lack of a full-time station agent has resulted in security issues after opening. A station agent booth was later added; the station began to be staffed on March 22, 2021. Installation of second-generation faregates at the station began from September 20–30, 2024.

BART anticipated the station would serve 1,575 round trips per day based upon a supposed opening in 2015. Before the proper opening, BART forecasted 2,270 trips per day. Two weeks following the beginning of service in 2018, ridership was observed to be about 3,000 round trips per day, overloading the station's parking facilities and causing riders to illegally park nearby. The station has 1,012 parking spaces. Soon after opening, the agency began planning an additional 1,600 parking space facility north of the station site. In October 2018, BART announced plans for a $16.4 million, 800-space lot east of the station, which would open in 2020. In November 2019, the BART board approved a $9.9 million contract for an 850-space lot. The new lot opened on November 30, 2021.

A 2018 study recommended a footbridge to the south side of State Route 4, as well as improvements to bicycle and pedestrian access. As of 2024, BART indicates "significant market, local support, and/or implementation barriers" that must be overcome to allow transit-oriented development on the surface parking lots at the station. Such development would not begin until at least the mid-2030s.

== See also ==
- Antioch–Pittsburg station (Amtrak)
