= EBART =

Hybrid rail service in Contra Costa County, California

eBART
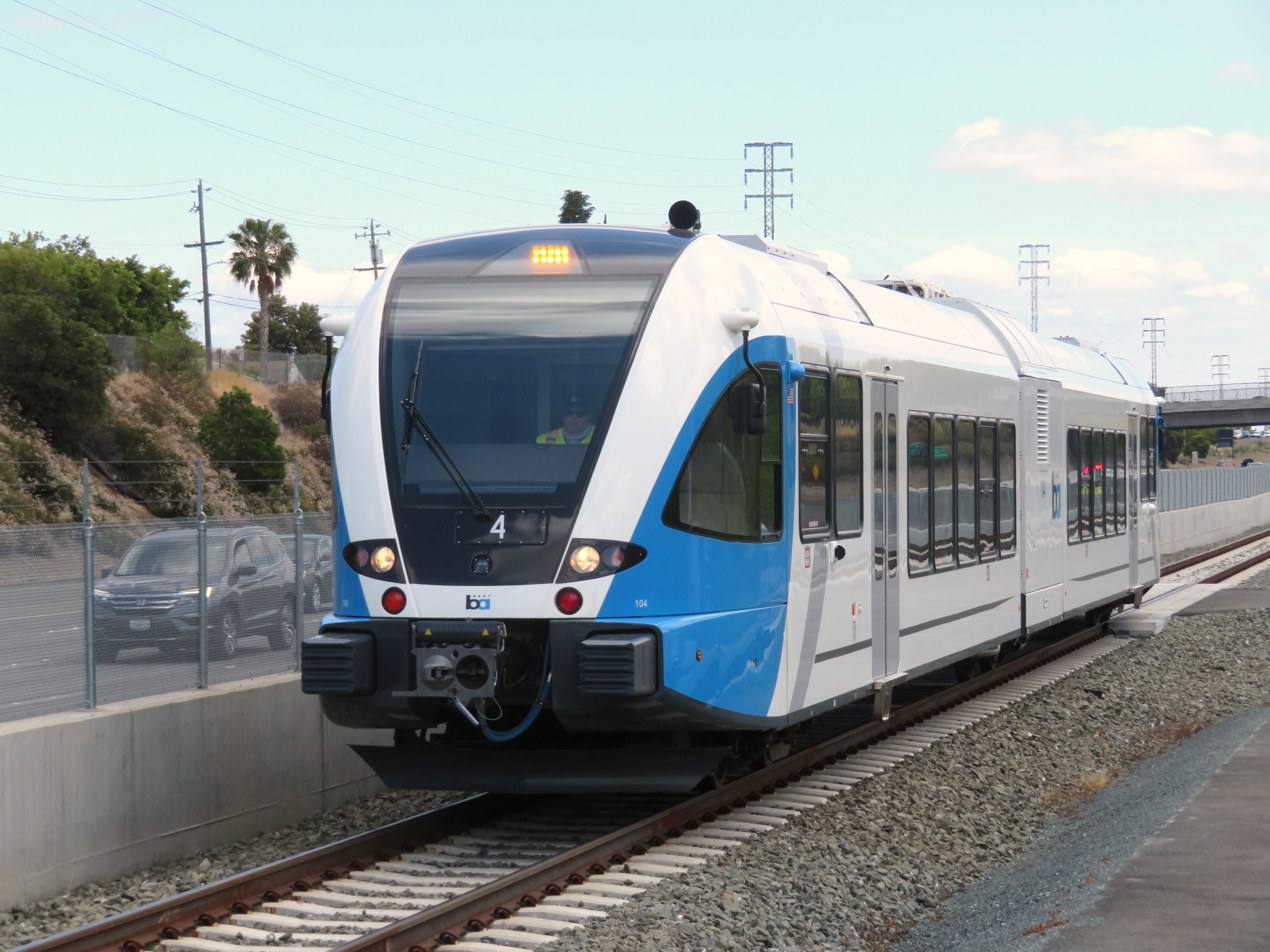
- Stadler GTW near Pittsburg Center station, May 2018

Overview
- Other name: East Contra Costa County BART extension
- Owner: Bay Area Rapid Transit District
- Locale: East Contra Costa County
- Termini: Antioch; Pittsburg/Bay Point
- Stations: 3
- Website: Official website

Service
- Type: Hybrid rail
- System: Bay Area Rapid Transit
- Services: 1
- Depot(s): Antioch Maintenance Yard
- Rolling stock: 8 Stadler GTW
- Daily ridership: 4,900 (weekdays, Q4 2025)
- Ridership: 1,431,700 (2025)

History
- Opened: May 26, 2018; 7 years ago

Technical
- Line length: 9.1 miles (14.6 km)
- Number of tracks: 2
- Character: Grade separated in highway median
- Track gauge: 4 ft 8 1/2 in (1,435 mm) standard gauge
- Operating speed: Up to 75 mph (121 km/h)
Route map
eBART highlighted in yellow

eBART (East Contra Costa County BART extension) is a hybrid rail branch line of the Bay Area Rapid Transit (BART) system in eastern Contra Costa County, California, United States. The line extends the Yellow Line beyond Pittsburg/Bay Point station to Antioch station. The American Public Transportation Association classifies the service as commuter rail.

The break of gauge and the use of diesel power makes the eBART system separate from and incompatible with the main BART rapid transit system. Passengers make a cross-platform transfer at an auxiliary island platform 0.6 miles (0.97 km) east of Pittsburg/Bay Point station. From this platform, the extension proceeds 9.1 miles (14.6 km) east in the State Route 4 median to the city of Antioch at a Hillcrest Avenue station. The BART map treats this service and the service using standard BART trains as a single line, dubbed the Yellow Line.

== History ==
=== Development ===
A feasibility study which completed in 2001 proposed an extension of BART service into eastern Contra Costa County using diesel multiple units (DMU) on standard gauge track in an existing rail right-of-way, to reduce costs compared to full BART service (grade-separated broad-gauge track). It was estimated the cost of extending conventional BART would be up to 2 1/2 times the cost of an equivalent service using DMUs over the same distance. Because commercially available DMUs could not meet Federal Railroad Administration crash standards, they would need to be separated from freight rail, either by operating on an exclusive set of tracks or at exclusive times during the day. A key requirement of the extension ensured that broad-gauge BART could be constructed in the future using the new structures that would be built.

Initial plans published in 2002 proposed DMU trains would run in the median of California State Route 4 east of the existing terminus at Pittsburg/Bay Point in an area reserved for BART expansion, then the tracks would cross the freeway via an aerial structure at Loveridge Road in Pittsburg to continue east along the Union Pacific Railroad right-of-way (ROW) for its Tracy Subdivision, also known as the Mococo Line (after the MOuntain COpper COmpany), which runs parallel to and between SR 4 (to the south) and the BNSF Stockton Subdivision (to the north) from Martinez to Oakley. At Oakley, eBART would turn southeast, continuing to follow the ROW of the UPRR Tracy Subdivision, terminating at Byron. The existing freight rail line would be relocated within the right-of-way to accommodate double-track eBART service. At the time, the Mococo Line was largely inactive, used to store freight cars.

The initial proposal also planned to build five stations over a system length of 23 mi (37 km), each located near where the Mococo Line crosses the following streets:

- Somersville Road (Pittsburg/Antioch)
- Hillcrest Avenue (Antioch)
- Empire Avenue (Oakley)
- Central Avenue (Brentwood)
- Downtown Byron

By 2005, a sixth station had been added in Pittsburg (at Railroad Avenue, in the median of SR 4) and the Somersville Road station had been relocated east to the Antioch Fairgrounds near L Street.

=== Finalized plans ===
After Union Pacific declined to grant trackage rights or allow laying of new tracks, the planned route was merged with a construction project already in progress for SR 4, with tracks to continue east of Loveridge in its median. UP declared it needed the Mococo Line to relieve freight traffic on the Martinez Subdivision. The SR 4 Bypass project widened the freeway and extended it to the east by adding a bypass for local streets in Brentwood and Antioch. By the time the draft environmental impact report (DEIR) for eBART was published in 2008, the initial proposed phase had been scaled back to two stations, retaining an intermediate stop in Pittsburg (Railroad Ave) and shifting the planned terminus to Antioch (Hillcrest Ave), along with a transfer platform near the existing Pittsburg/Bay Point station; the DEIR also included alternative locations for the Phase I terminal station in Antioch (Hillcrest Ave), which would preserve plans for a planned extension east and south from Antioch along the Mococo Line right-of-way.

Daily ridership was initially projected at 3,900 to 5,600 entrances and exits per weekday, assuming an opening date of 2015, rising to 10,100 by 2030, with planned service headways of 15 minutes. Total travel time would be 13 minutes from the transfer platform to Antioch (Hillcrest), including a 3 minute dwell at the transfer platform and a 1 minute stop at Pittsburg (Railroad Ave). It was estimated that a single DMU rail car has a fuel consumption of 1.38 mpg_{‑US} (170 l/100 km).

Alternatives studied included bus rapid transit using dedicated lanes, overhead (catenary) electric light rail vehicles, and standard BART trains. Compared to the proposed $486 million cost to implement eBART with DMUs, a similar BRT service would cost $393–611 M, depending on the options selected; LRV $528 M; and BART $1173 M.

=== Funding and construction ===
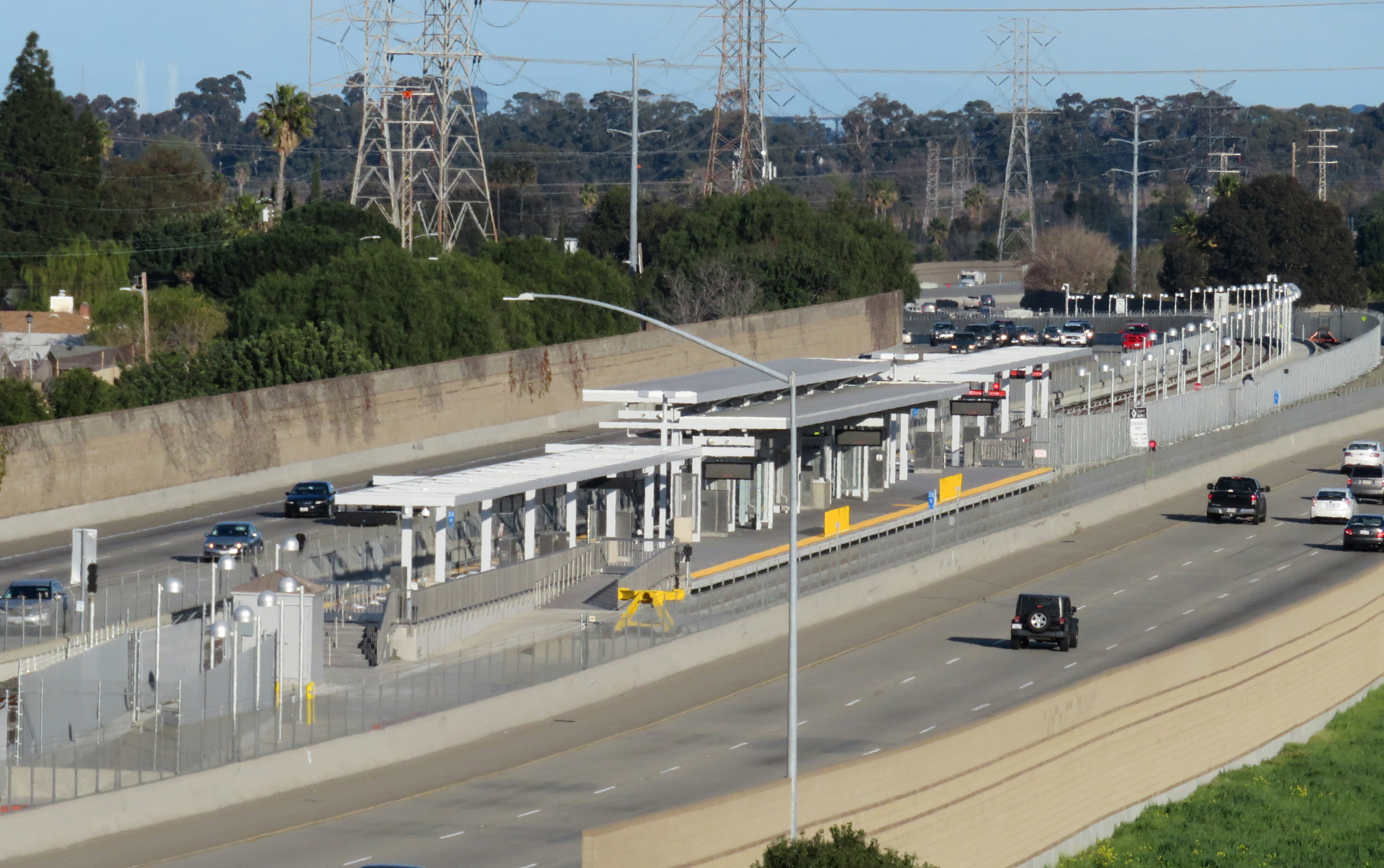
Transfer platform under construction in 2018

A sales tax increase was approved by Contra Costa voters in 2004 in order to fund the expansion. The expansion was approved by the BART board in April 2009. Costs were set at $463 million (equivalent to $695 million in 2025), compared to an estimated $1.2 billion (equivalent to $1.8 billion in 2025) for full BART buildout. On October 14, 2010, BART issued a press release announcing that the agency had awarded a $26 million (equivalent to $38.4 million in 2025) contract to West Bay Builders, of Novato, "to build the transfer platform and make some of the necessary rail improvements to begin extending the line to a terminus station at Hillcrest Avenue in Antioch."

Construction on the line began in early 2011. Construction of the Railroad Avenue station in Pittsburg had been uncertain as planning and construction progressed but it was fully funded by the city in early 2015, and opened in 2018 along with the rest of the extension.

=== Start of service ===
Revenue service began on May 26, 2018. The new stations reached 7,441 daily customer entrances and exits within the first three workdays, while ridership and parking levels at the previous terminal, Pittsburg/Bay Point, declined. Its design and operation, the result of several compromises, were criticized by Streetsblog.

=== Future ===
While not fully planned or funded as of 2018, proposals have been advanced to extend the eBART line to Oakley, Byron, or the Brentwood Transit Center in Brentwood. During the planning phase for Antioch station, it was noted that any potential extension along the median of SR 4 is feasible only to Balfour Road in Brentwood without further widening of the freeway; by acquiring a right-of-way adjacent to the Mococo Line, service could be extended to Laurel Road in Brentwood.

In 2017, the San Joaquin Regional Rail Commission indicated that eBART could be extended to Tracy, where it would connect with the Altamont Corridor Express and the proposed Valley Link line. An extension to Tracy is possible only if rights to share the Mococo Line right-of-way are acquired from UPRR. This would create a transit loop connecting the current eastern termini of the BART Yellow (Pittsburg/Bay Point) and Blue (Dublin/Pleasanton) lines.

== Stations ==
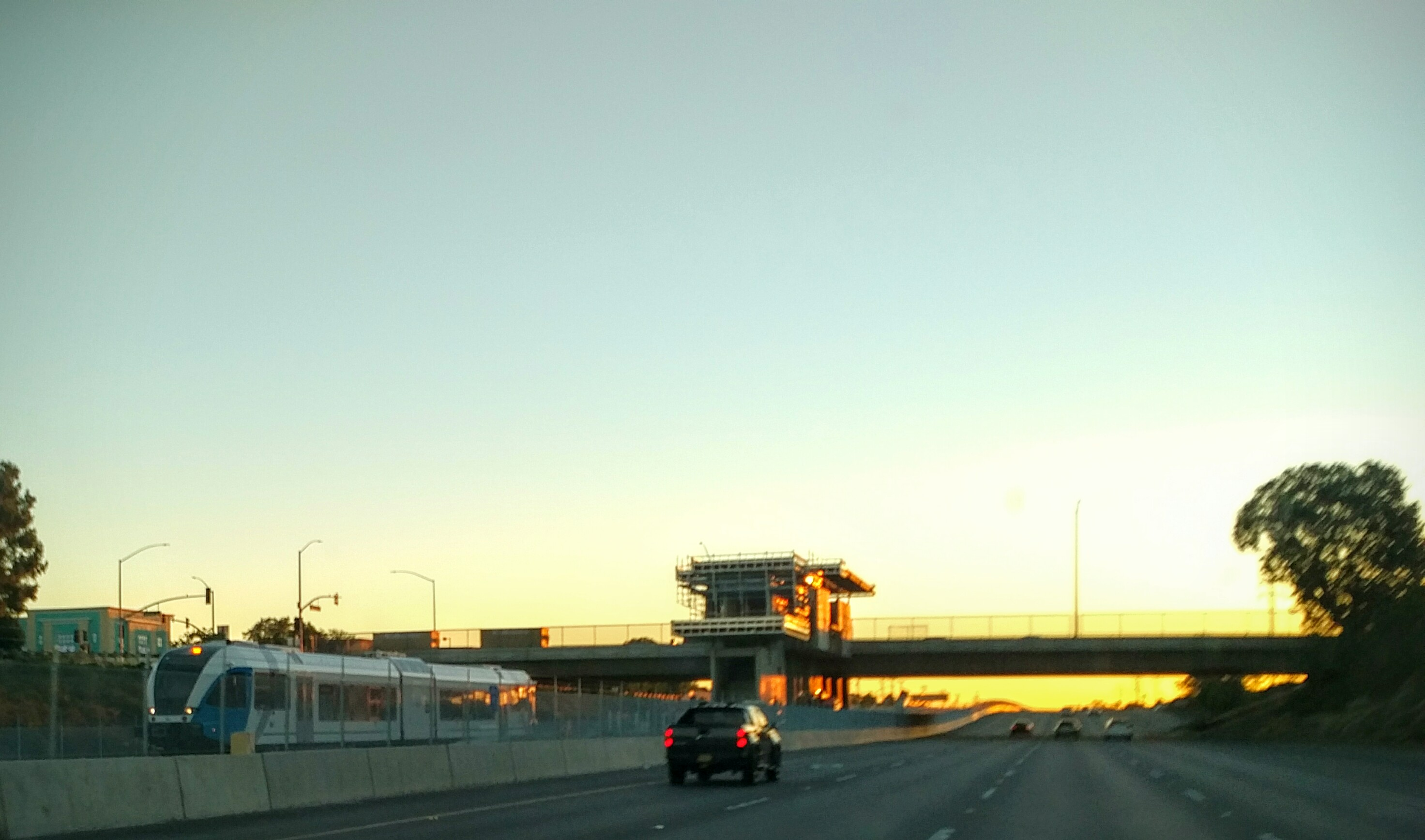
Test DMU leaving Pittsburg Center station in the median of Highway 4 at sunset heading east to the Hillcrest Avenue, Antioch terminus

All eBART stations are in Contra Costa County.

Station	City	Opened	Other BART lines
Antioch	Antioch	May 26, 2018	
Pittsburg Center	Pittsburg	May 26, 2018	
Pittsburg/Bay Point	Pittsburg	December 7, 1996	Yellow Line

== Rolling stock ==
Trains servicing the line include eight Stadler GTW coupled pairs. The first were delivered in June 2016, and the agency has two options to procure six more sets. The Stadler GTW trains are diesel multiple units with 2/6 articulated power units, and are based on models previously used in Austin (CapMetro Rail), Denton (A-train), and New Jersey (River Line).

== See also ==
- Hybrid rail
