= Antioch Police Department =

Police department for the city of Antioch, California

- Abbreviation: APD

Agency overview
- Formed: 1872; 154 years ago
- Employees: 148

Jurisdictional structure
- General nature: Local civilian police

Operational structure
- Sworn members: authorized 115
- Unsworn members: 33
- Agency executive: Joe Vigil, Chief

Website
- https://www.antiochca.gov/police/

The Antioch Police Department is a police department serving the East Bay city of Antioch, California in the San Francisco Bay Area.

== Organization ==
The department is organized into two divisions that administer a number of bureaus.

- Field Services
  - Patrol
  - Community Engagement
  - Traffic Bureau
- Support Services
  - Administration
  - Dispatch
  - Investigations
  - Special Operations
  - Records.

== History ==
The police department was created in 1872 to handle security and law enforcement in the coal mining town of hundreds that was 19th-century Antioch. By the 2010 census the department was policing over 102,000 Antiochites. In 2011 the department expressed serious concerns for the lack of a planning for a safety officer at the future Antioch eBART station. Due to funding issues, this station may be actually be policed in whole or in part by the APD instead of the BART Police Department.

After the 2020 police-related death of Angelo Quinto, California banned police holds that might result in asphyxiation.

In April 2023, press reports described an investigation into misconduct in the department. This included dozens of racist texts sent between officers. At that time, a federal grand jury was looking into allegations of charging officers with assault under color of authority, fraud, distribution of steroids and cocaine, as well as eliciting false confessions and accepting bribes to make traffic tickets go away. Newspaper accounts at the time reported that about 20 percent of the force was suspended.

In 2023, nine serving and former police officers were arrested by the FBI on charges related to distribute narcotics, altering and falsifying records of a federal investigation, wire fraud where officers allegedly defrauded money from the police department, civil rights violations and obstruction of justice. Six of those arrested were serving or former Antioch Police officers. Three more are associated with the nearby Pittsburg Police Department.

== See also ==
- Killing of Angelo Quinto
- List of law enforcement agencies in California
