= Pittsburg Marina =

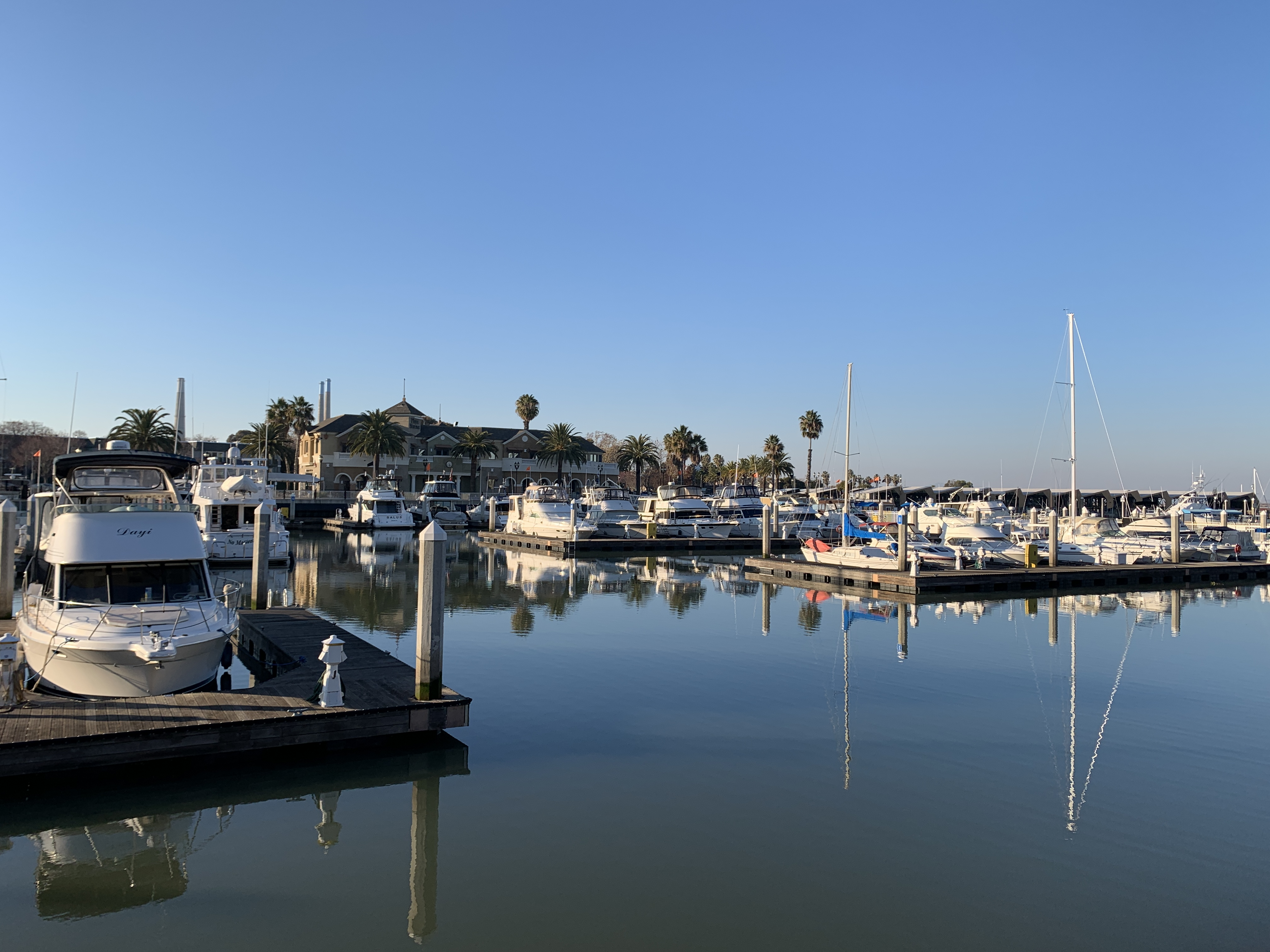

Location
- Country: United States
- Location: Pittsburg, California
- Coordinates: 38°02′08″N 121°53′01″W

Details
- Owned by: City of Pittsburg
- Size: ~38 acres (15 ha)
- No. of berths: 575
- Draft depth: Average 7.5 feet (2.3 m)

Statistics
- Website pittsburgmarina.com

Pittsburg Marina is a marina situated at the confluence of the Sacramento and San Joaquin Rivers in Pittsburg, California. It is located within walking distance from Old Town Pittsburg.

The Marina is owned and operated by the City of Pittsburg, and serves as the "Gateway to the Delta", providing access to the San Francisco Bay. The Marina, located north of downtown Pittsburg, offers 575 berths, 274 of which are covered.

Surrounded by extensive marshes, Browns Island is located across New York Slough from the Marina.

== History ==
The Marina was important to the local fishing, canning and packing industry that thrived here between the 1860s and 1957. Boat builders served regional fishermen building ships, ferries and dredgers. Sacramento River Packers, later purchased by F.E. Booth, played a prominent role in canning and packing, providing jobs for local citizens. Waterfront bars, owned by the Gatto's and Pietro Ferrante, served as a popular hangout for American author Jack London who acquired material for some of his books there.

In 2006, the George Lowy Marina Dock Replacement Project was completed, marking the revitalisation of the old harbour with the introduction of new floating docks.

== Facilities and activities ==
The Pittsburg Marina offers a range of amenities and activities.

- Plaza Marina: located adjacent to the small boat launch, it houses the Waterfront Grill & Café and Dále Vino wine bar.
- Fishermen's Catch Bait & Tackle: provides fishing supplies and equipment.
- Pittsburg Yacht Club: since March 1994, the Pittsburg Yacht Club has been located at the clubhouse in the Marina Park.
- Kayak and Stand-Up Paddleboard Rental: the city offers kayaks and stand-up paddleboard rental from the Marina.
- Fuel docks: the marina's Lowy Basin is equipped with four fuel docks.

=== Pescatori Fishing Boat ===
Located at the corner of Marina Blvd. & E. 3rd St, Pescatori, a 1945 Monterey-style commercial fishing boat, symbolizes Pittsburg's history in the fishing and canning industries. Purchased by the Pittsburg Historical Society in 2007, the boat underwent a full restoration and is now displayed at the Marina.

=== Public transportation ===
The Marina is accessible via public transportation through the Tri Delta Transit Pittsburg Route 381 Bus Line. This route connects to the Pittsburg Center BART station located approximately two miles south of the Marina.

== Events ==
Several annual events are hosted at the Marina, including Pittsburg's July 4 Fireworks Show, Seafood & Music Festival, and Fishing Derby.

== Gallery ==
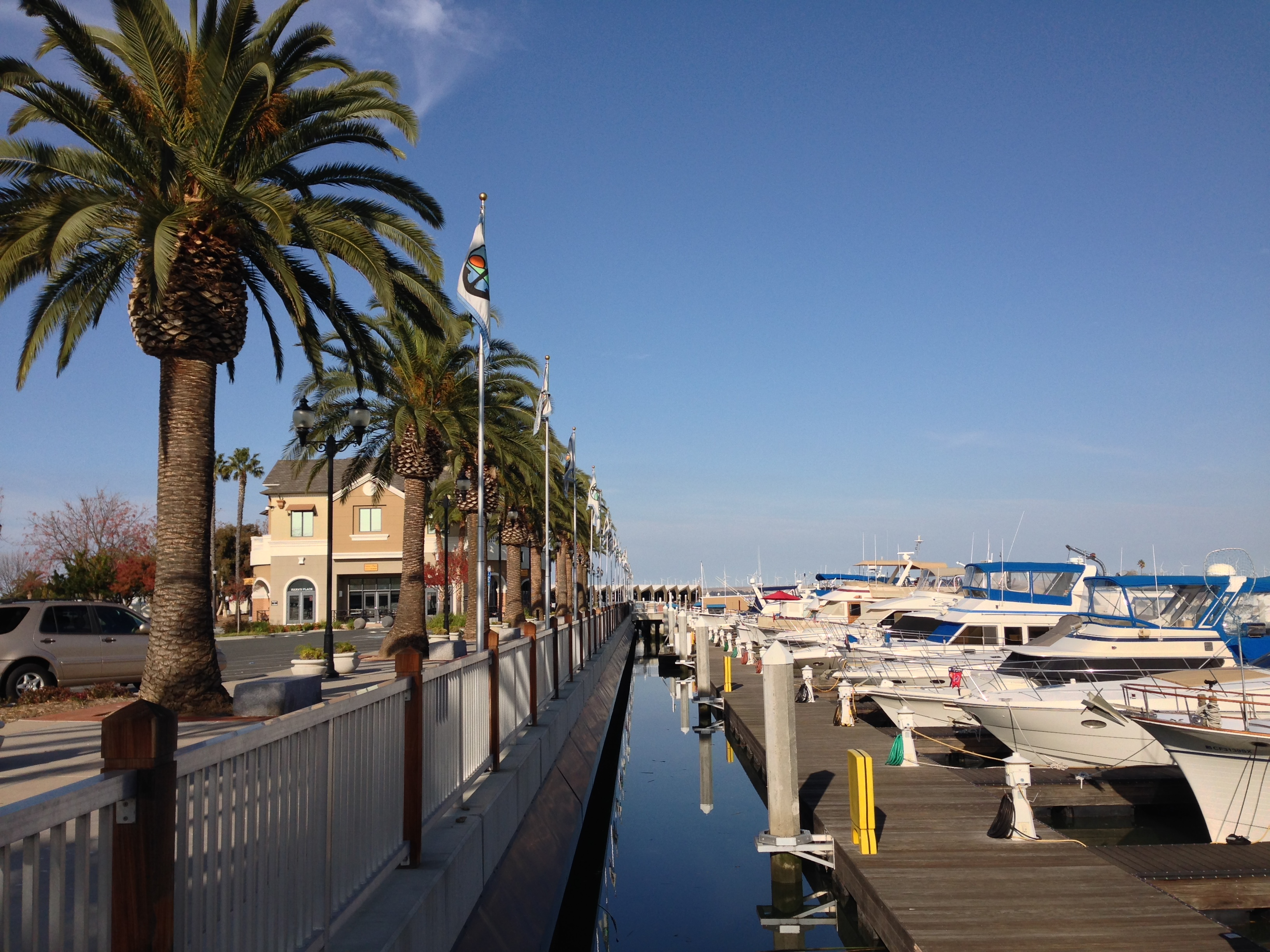

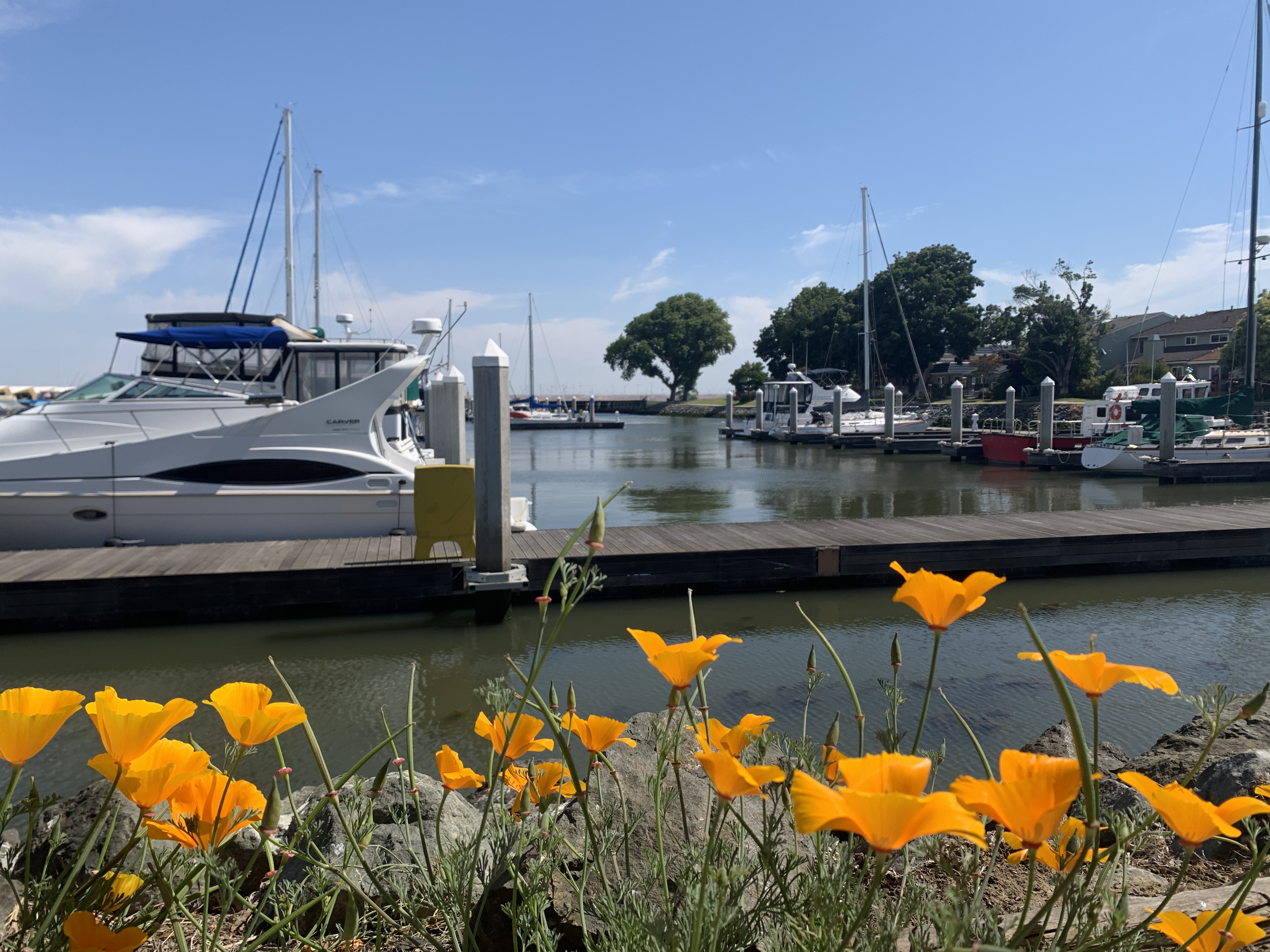

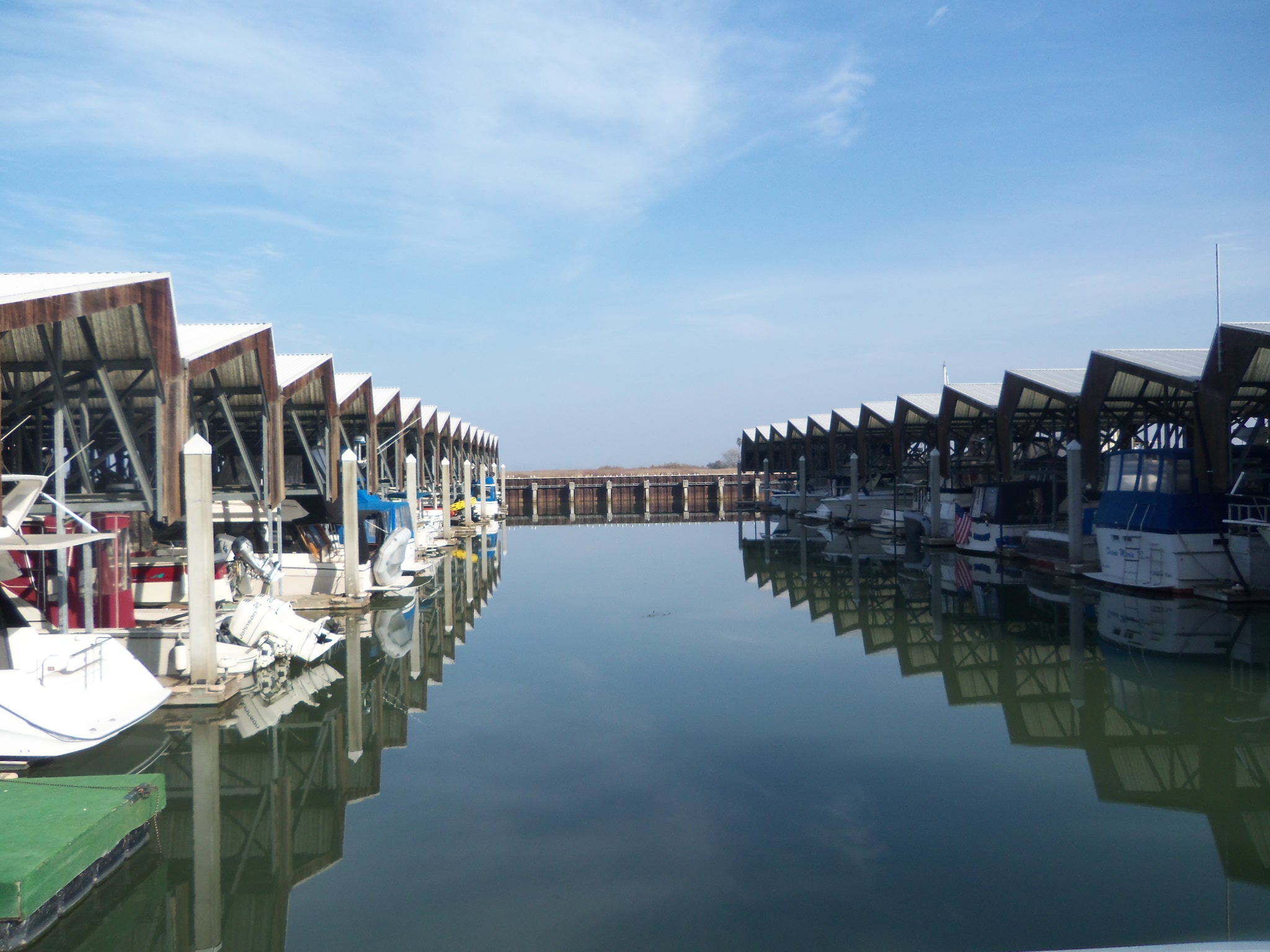
Pittsburg Marina covered berths

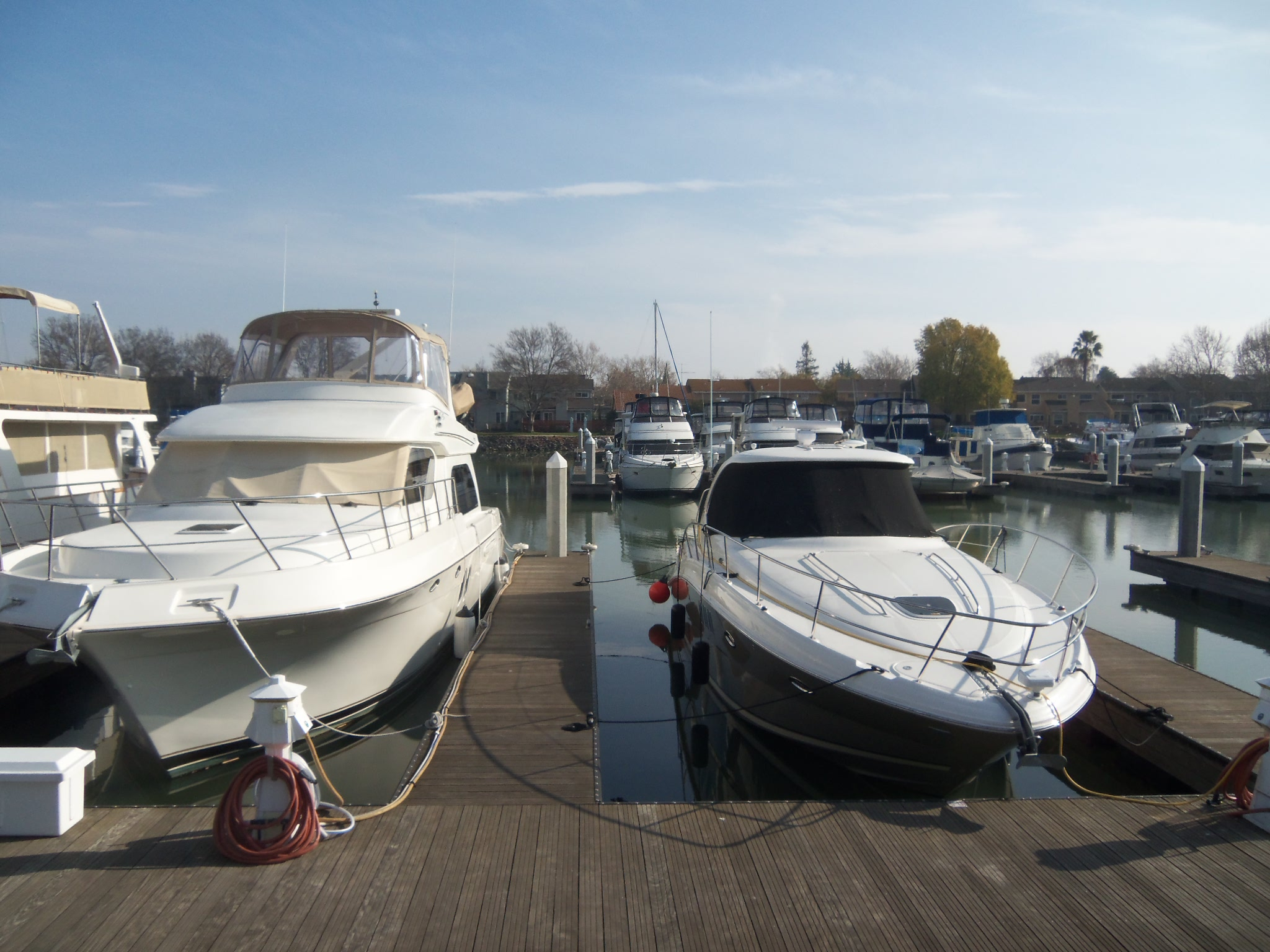

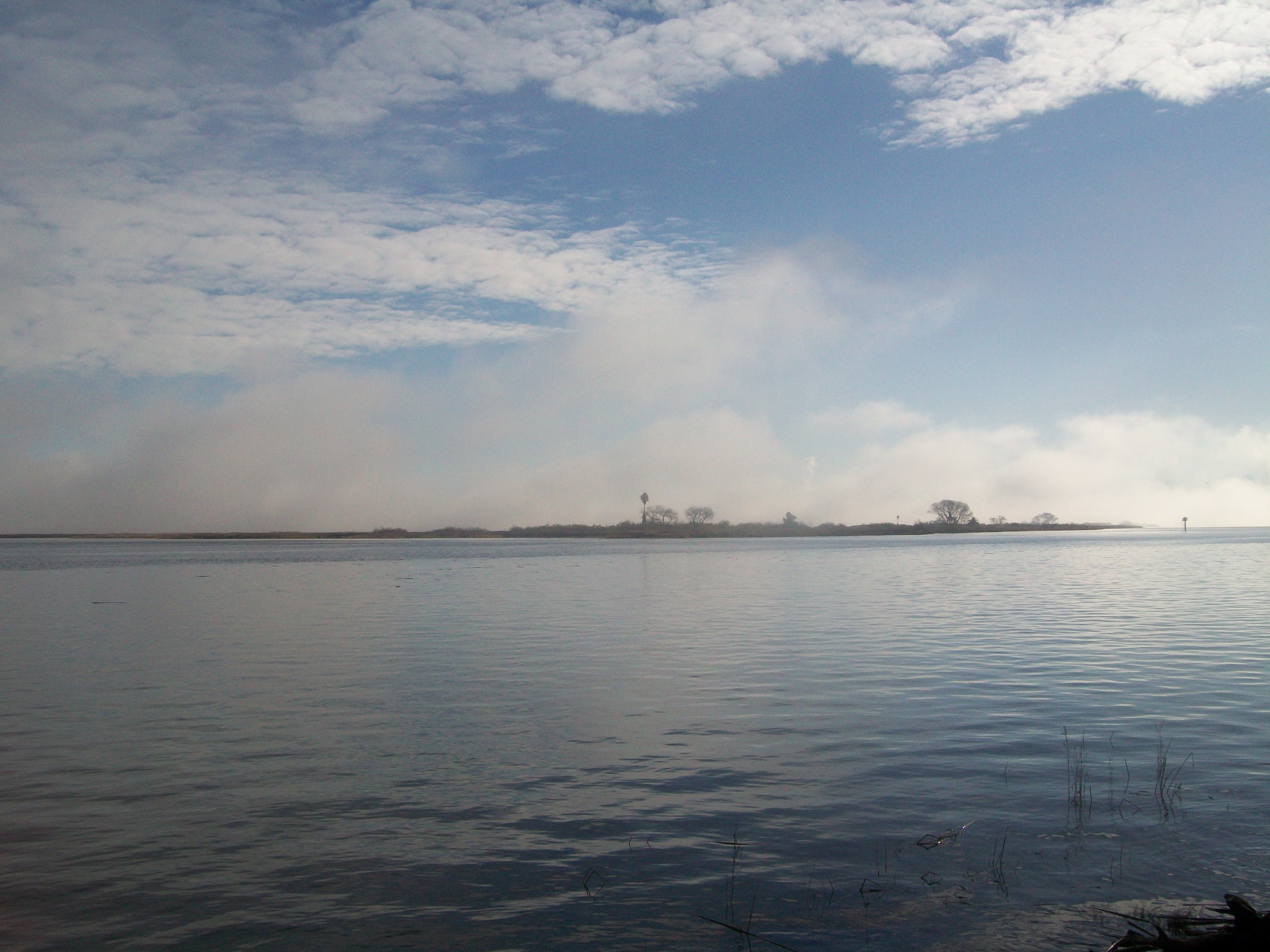
Pittsburg Marina view of Browns Island

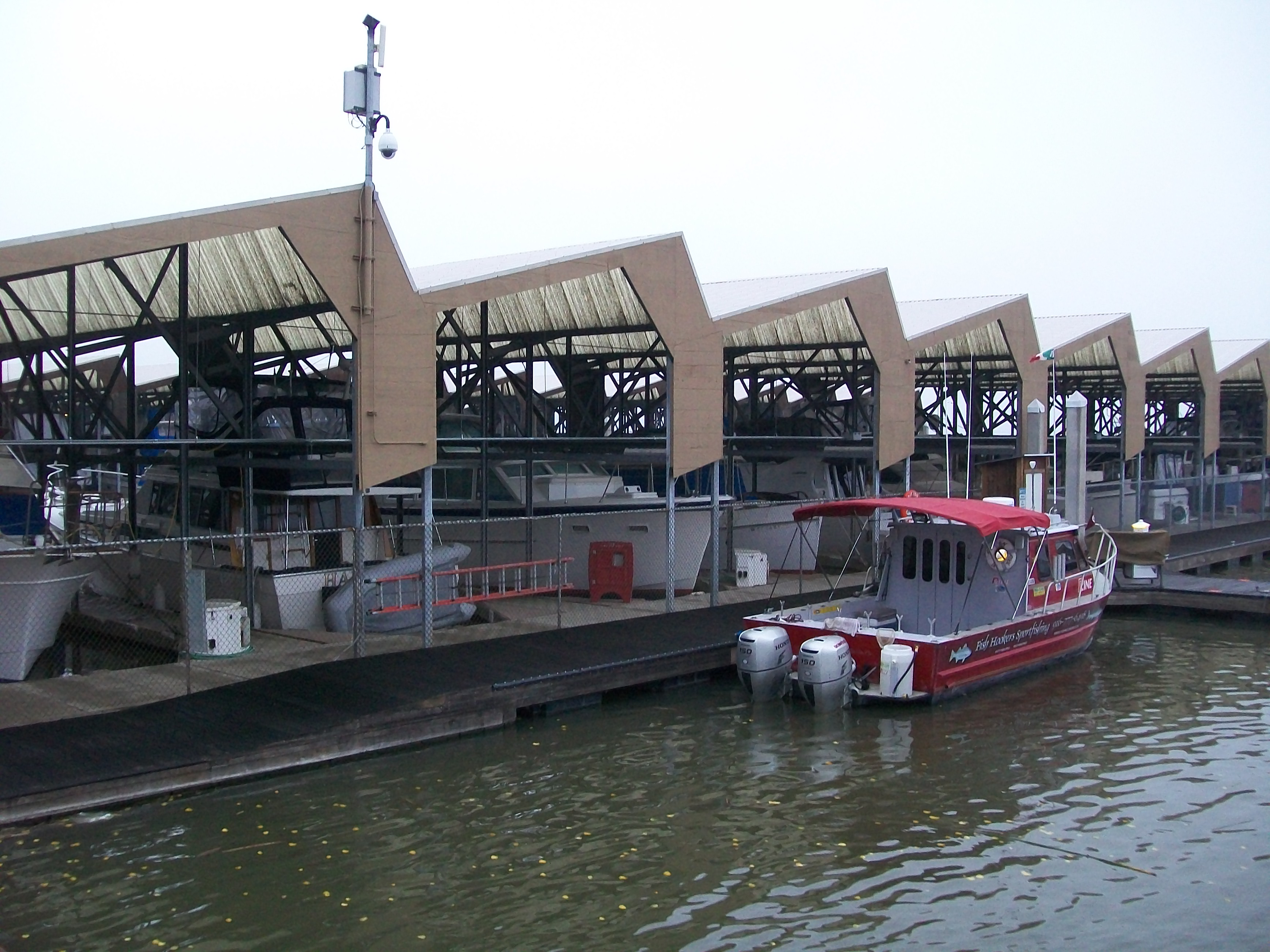
Pittsburg Marina covered berths

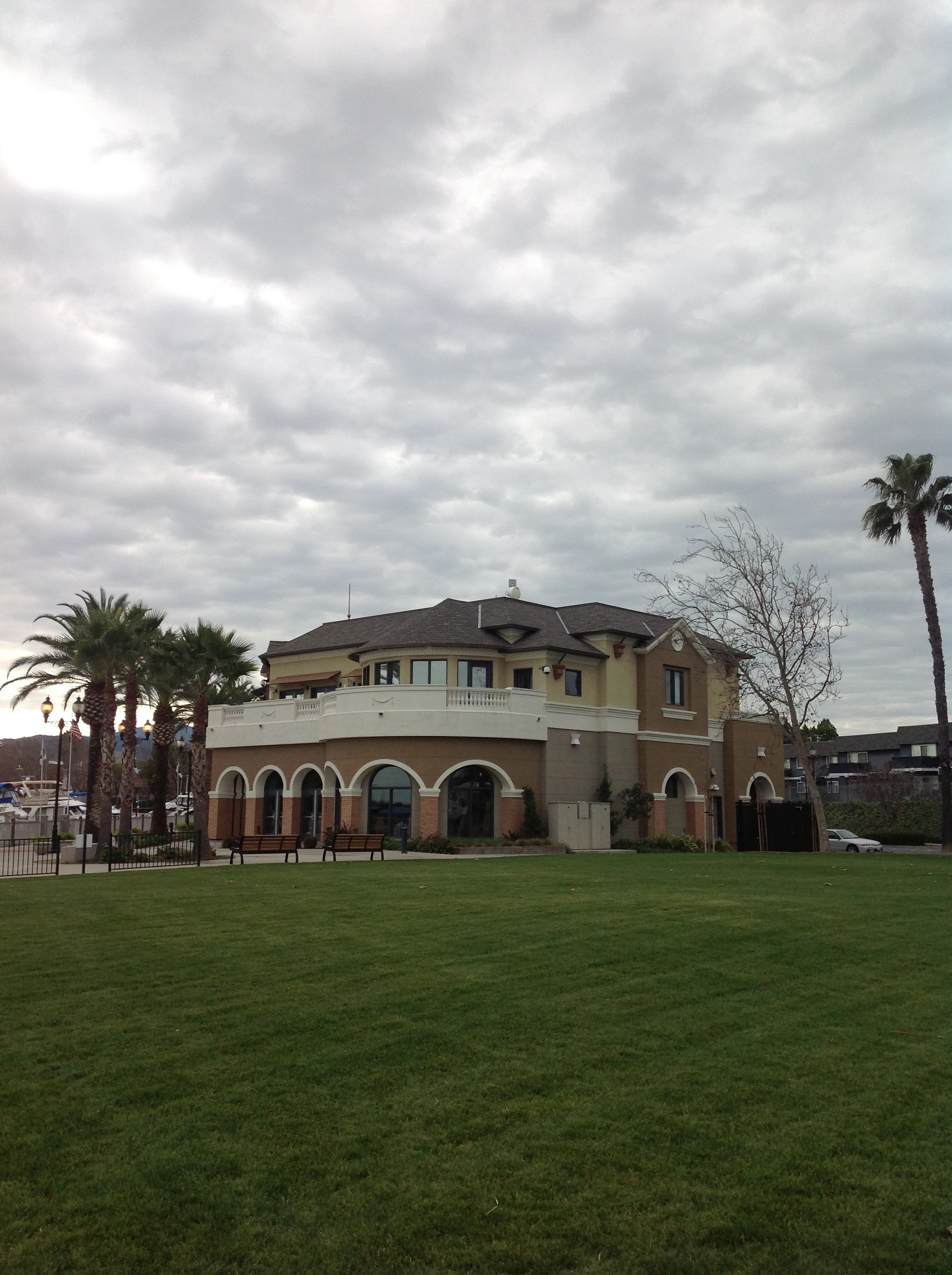
Plaza Marina Building

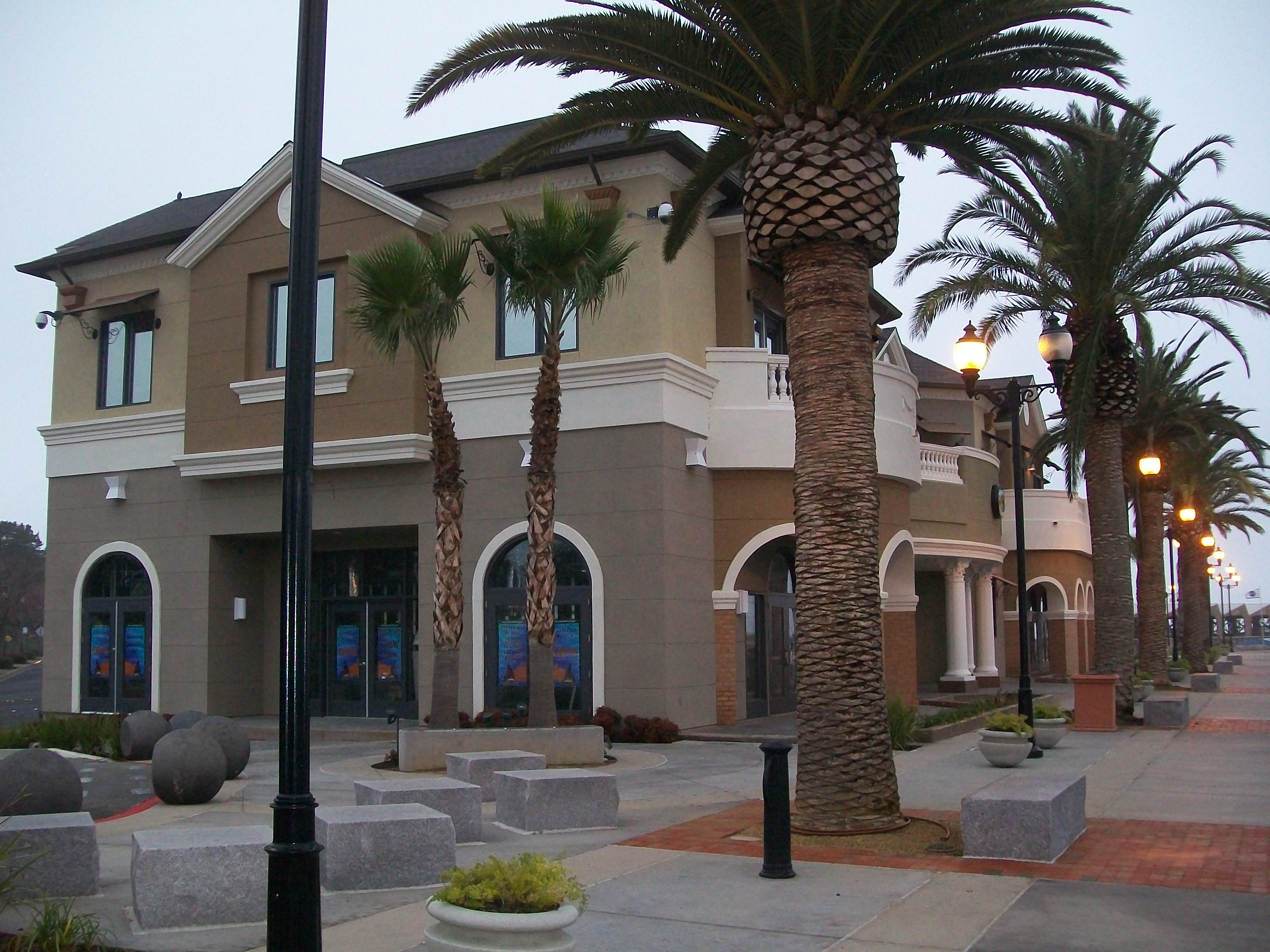
Plaza Marina Building

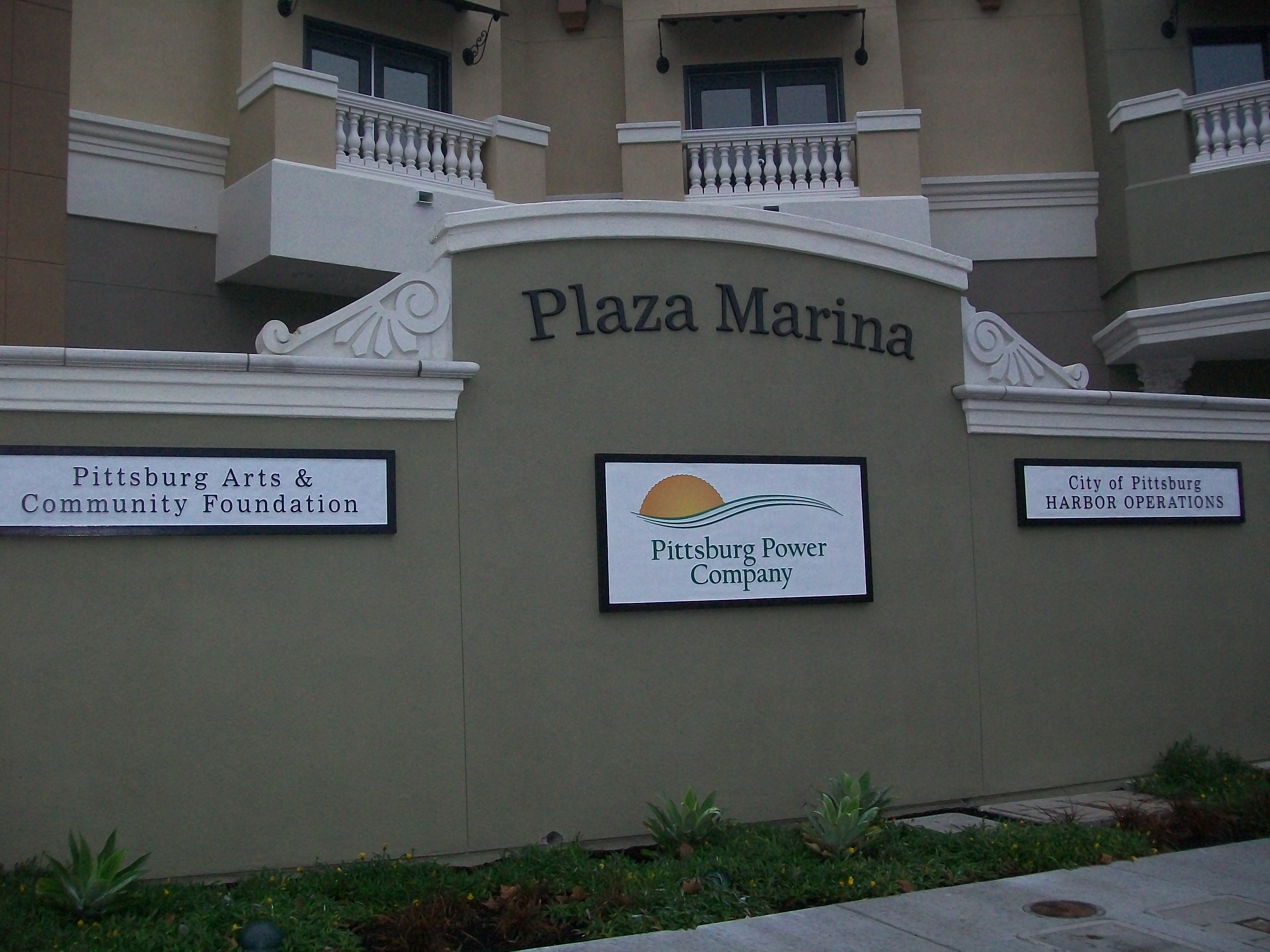
Plaza Marina Building

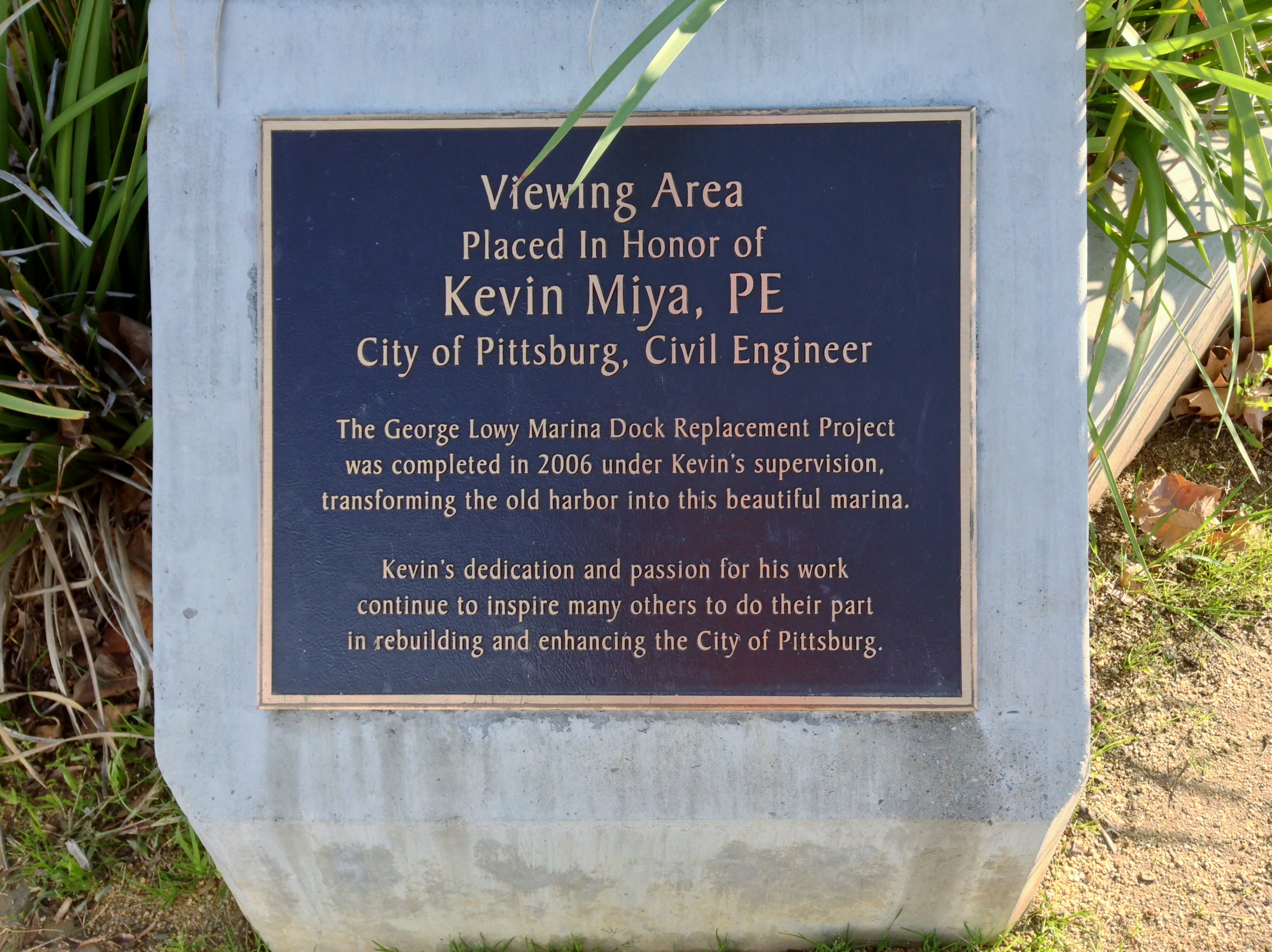

== See also ==
- Sacramento–San Joaquin River Delta
- San Francisco Bay
