= Pittsburg/Bay Point station =

Rapid transit station in San Francisco Bay Area

Pittsburg/Bay Point
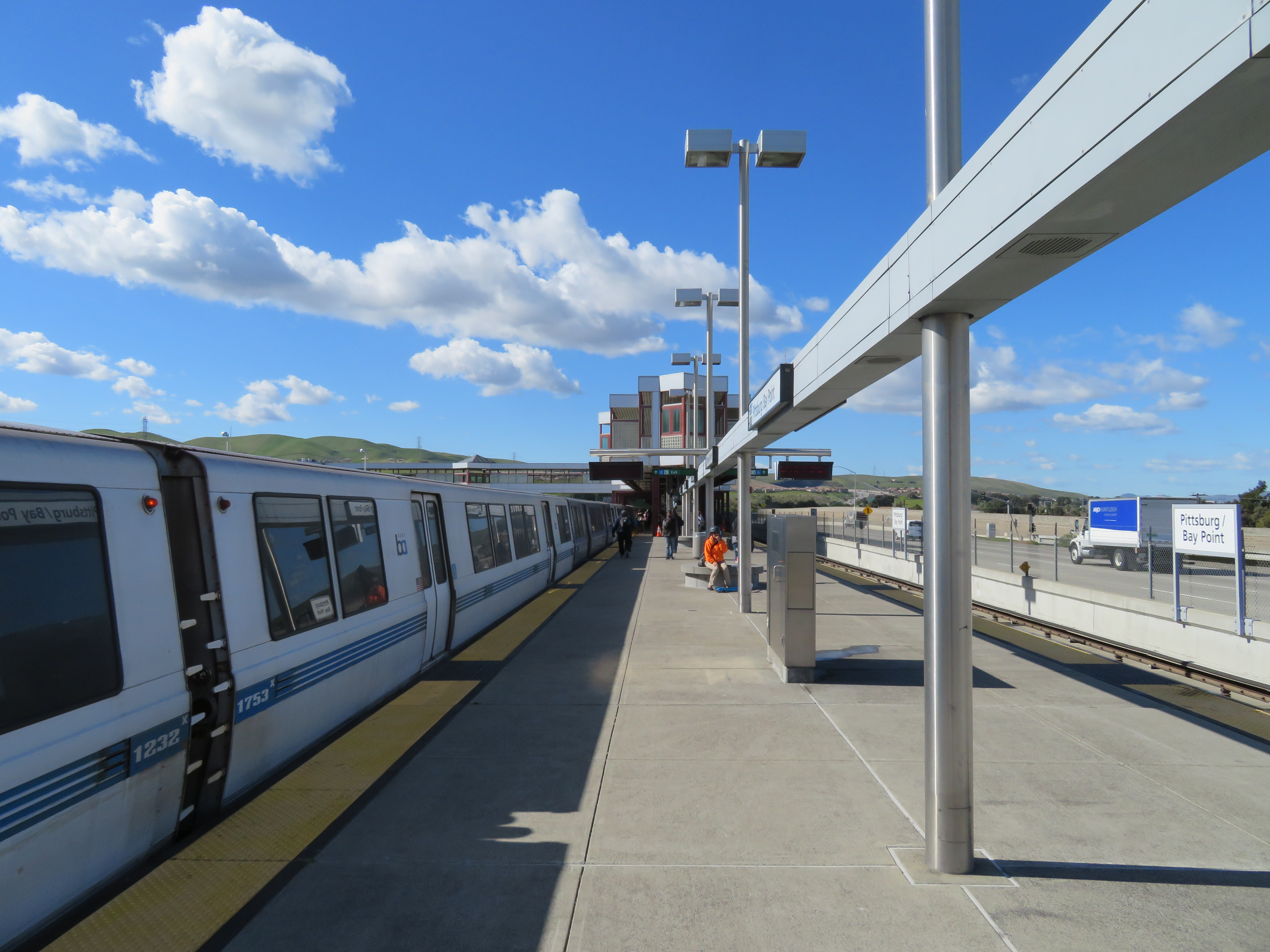
- A train at Pittsburg/Bay Point station in 2018

General information
- Location: 1700 West Leland Road; Pittsburg, California
- Coordinates: 38.018869°N 121.944208°W
- Lines: BART C-Line, BART E-Line
- Platforms: 2 sequential island platforms
- Tracks: 2 (BART mainline); 1 (eBART)
- Connections: AC Transit: 701; Rio Vista Delta Breeze: 52; Tri Delta Transit: 200, 201, 300, 380, 387, 388, 389, 390, 391, 392, 393, 394

Construction
- Structure type: At grade
- Parking: 1,992 spaces
- Cycle facilities: 20 lockers
- Accessible: Yes
- Architect: Gannett Fleming; Finger and Moy Architects

Other information
- Station code: BART: PITT

History
- Opened: December 7, 1996

Passengers
- 2026: 2,674 (weekday average)

Services
Preceding station	Bay Area Rapid Transit	Following station
North Concord/Martinez toward SFO or Millbrae	Yellow Line	Terminus
Terminus	Yellow Line (eBART)	Pittsburg Center toward Antioch
Track layout
Key
Location

Pittsburg/Bay Point station is a Bay Area Rapid Transit station in Pittsburg, California, United States, adjacent to the community of Bay Point. It serves northern and eastern Contra Costa County, as well as the Sacramento–San Joaquin River Delta area. Passengers transfer between the light and heavy rail portions of the Yellow Line at a dedicated transfer platform east of the main station.

== History ==
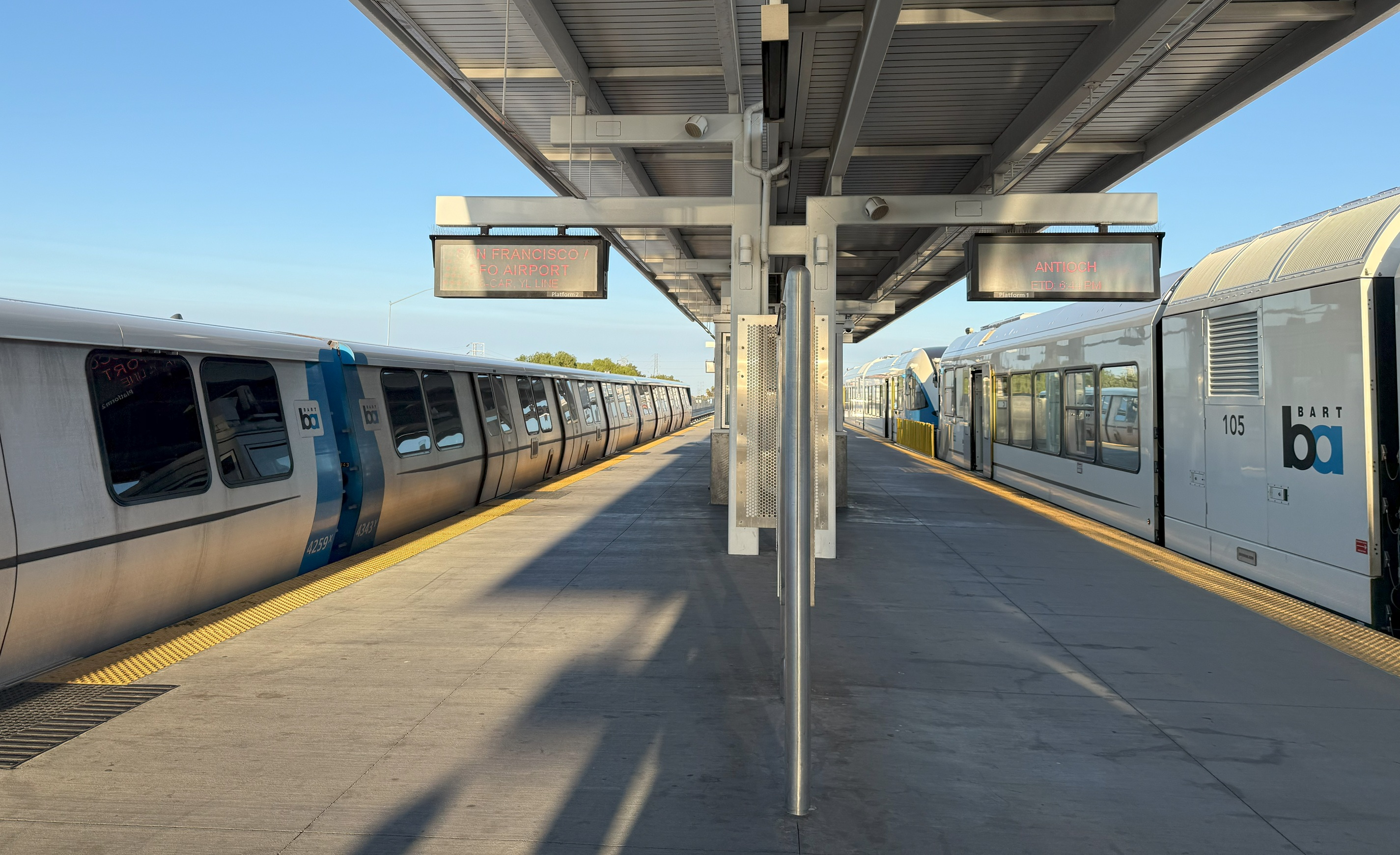
eBART and main Yellow Line trains at the transfer platform in 2025

The station was called West Pittsburg during planning. The name was changed to Pittsburg/Bay Point on January 14, 1994, while the station was under construction. It opened on December 7, 1996.

BART began service on the eBART line between Pittsburg/Bay Point and Antioch station on May 26, 2018. Unlike the rest of the BART system, the eBART extension uses small self-propelled diesel multiple unit (DMU) railcars, thus requiring a passenger transfer between the two different trains. A second island platform (with one track for eBART and one for conventional BART trains) was constructed 0.6 miles (0.97 km) to the east of the original Pittsburg/Bay Point platform, providing a cross-platform transfer for passengers transferring at the station. The transfer platform does not have street access, so eBART passengers exiting at Pittsburg/Bay Point must ride a mainline BART train connecting the two platforms.

On September 11, 2023, BART changed the frequencies of its services. Yellow Line mainline service was increased to 10-minute headways on weekdays, with every alternate train having an Antioch connection at Pittsburg/Bay Point.

A 2018 study recommended a footbridge to the north side of the tracks — either from the fare lobby or the parking lot — to improve access from nearby residential areas. A ramp to supplement the often-broken elevator from parking lot to fare lobby was also recommended. An entrance from Bailey Road at the east end of the platform was deemed infeasible. As of 2024, BART anticipates soliciting a developer between 2029 and 2033 for transit-oriented development to replace surface parking at the station.
