= Tri Delta Transit =

Public transit agency in Contra Costa County, California

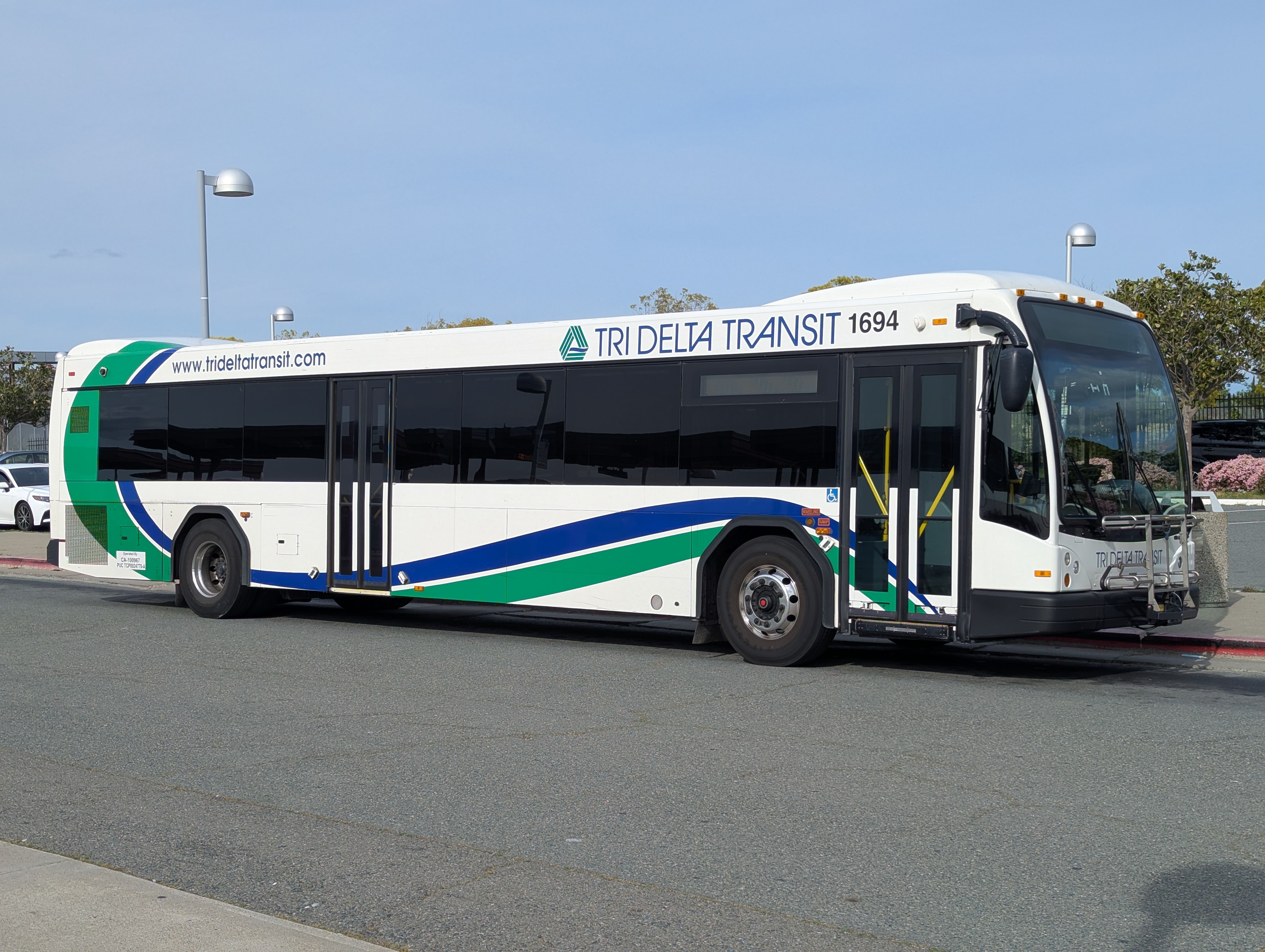
- Parent: Eastern Contra Costa Transit Authority
- Founded: 1977
- Headquarters: 801 Wilbur Ave, Antioch, California, United States
- Locale: East Contra Costa County, California
- Service type: bus service, paratransit
- Routes: 13 weekday, 8 weekend
- Stops: approximately 650
- Fleet: 62 transit bus; 30 paratransit; 6 med vans; 8 microtransit Tri MyRide
- Daily ridership: 4,500 (weekdays, Q1 2026)
- Annual ridership: 1,321,000 (2025)
- Operator: Transdev
- Website: trideltatransit.com

Tri Delta Transit, formally the Eastern Contra Costa Transit Authority, is a joint powers agency (JPA) of the governments of Pittsburg, Antioch, Oakley, Brentwood, and Contra Costa County that provides bus service for the eastern area of Contra Costa County, California, United States. Contra Costa County has four major public bus transportation services, divided geographically: three mostly serve destinations within the county, covering western (WestCAT), central (County Connection), and eastern (Tri Delta Transit) regions, and one (AC Transit) serves Bayside cities along the western edges of Contra Costa and Alameda counties. In 2025, the system had a ridership of 1,321,000, or about 4,500 per weekday as of the first quarter of 2026.

Tri Delta Transit local buses connect to the BART rapid transit system at Antioch, Pittsburg Center, Pittsburg/Bay Point and Concord. In addition, Tri Delta Transit buses connect with Amtrak commuter rail services, including Gold Runner and Capitol Corridor. Within the county, several Tri Delta Transit bus routes connect with County Connection and WestCAT.

== History ==
The Eastern Contra Costa Transit Authority (ECCTA) JPA was formed in 1976 by the cities of Antioch, Brentwood, and Pittsburg, along with the County of Contra Costa. When Oakley was incorporated in 1999, the JPA was amended to admit Oakley on April 1, 2001. The Tri Delta Transit name was selected in May 1977 by the marketing committee of the ECCTA.

=== 1977–1995 ===
Tri Delta Transit fixed route service began on June 6, 1977, celebrated by an inaugural bus starting from Antioch City Hall (10 a.m.), traveling to Oakley (10:30), Brentwood City Hall (11), Pittsburg, and ending in West Pittsburg (2 p.m.). For the first week, free rides were offered. Initial service was provided for two local routes in Antioch and Pittsburg, which connected with express bus service serving BART.

AC Transit operated the service under contract until 1984, when it was transferred to a private operator, and ECCTA acquired its first buses; prior to that, AC Transit owned the buses it used for Tri Delta Transit. Some of the buses used in 1978 included 29-foot models, shortened from 35-foot buses at the AC Transit shops.

Dial-a-ride on-demand transit services have been provided since January 1979 using contracted private operators such as Community Transit Services (CTS). In 1981, Dial-a-ride was expanded to serve all residents of the rural East County. In 1984, ECCTA consolidated fixed route and on-demand services with a single operator when the contract with AC Transit were terminated; this transition involved ECCTA's acquisition of seven 35 foot Gillig diesel buses for use in fixed route service. In 1986, Laidlaw Transit, Inc. (later First Transit, now Transdev) replaced CTS for all services and begin operating Tri Delta Transit.

The ECCTA headquarters in Antioch was built in 1987, consolidating administration, operations, and maintenance at a single facility; this involved Tri Delta Transit's acquisition of another six 35 foot Gillig diesel buses for use in fixed route service. In July 1991, the Dial-a-ride service was once again limited to seniors and disabled persons. Brentwood Dimes-a-Ride service (also known as the Brentwood Loop) began as a subsidized route by the City of Brentwood. General passenger fares were 10 cents.

=== 1995–1999 ===
On October 5, 1995, It was announced that County Connection proposed merging with Tri Delta Transit, it has been canceled. In July 1997, ECCTA took over the BART Express bus service in East County. The former BART Express buses operated by Laidlaw has a small Tri Delta Transit logo slapped on the sides. In November 1998, Tri Delta Transit announced it has plans for a luxury bus service between Brentwood and Lawrence Livermore Laboratory.

In late-February 1999, Tri Delta Transit has a bus strike due to its contract with Laidlaw was nearing expiration. On September 24, 1999, Tri Delta Transit announced it will launch the Delta Express service in 2000. The agency's board of directors unanimously agreed to spend $2.8 million on purchasing the six "over-the-road" commuter coaches to launch the service.

=== 1999–2001 ===
On December 30, 1999, Tri Delta Transit announced it will purchase three new trolley transit buses for the Brentwood Dimes-a-Ride service. These buses resembled San Francisco's historic cable cars. The trolleys were built by Cable Car Classics in Healdsburg, California at a cost of $993,000 and having the squared-off look, and the clanging bells, that make cable cars instantly recognizable. But, unlike the cable cars in San Francisco, they'll be closed-in to protect riders from the elements. The trolley buses began operating on April 2, 2001, in Downtown Brentwood.

The three trolley buses in Brentwood are named "Desire" (which was named for the play by Tennessee Williams), "Barbara" (which is named for Barbara Guise, a former ECCTA board member and former Brentwood mayor) and Delta Dawn. The new Dimes-a-Ride buses replaced the older, 1980s Gillig Phantom buses. The buses originally deliver in time for the CornFest in July 2000. When the new trolley buses were coming to Brentwood, It was announced in late-June 2000 that Tri Delta Transit will start its long-awaited bus service to Lawrence Livermore Laboratory. The new service, called "Delta Express" used six 2000 MCI 102-EL3 motorcoaches instead of the regular, white Gillig transit buses.

On November 29, 2000, Tri Delta Transit purchased two Gillig demonstration buses for $100,000, these buses will be used for the Oakley route. These buses are the 1999 Gillig Low Floor 29' models, which includes 9996 and 9997. The first one was the first Gillig Low Floor 29' ever built, when the second one was a demo for Tri Delta Transit. When the new buses delivered to the agency, Tri Delta Transit began operating its route 383 service to Oakley (known as the Oakley Loop) effective April 1, 2001, the same month as the new trolley buses started operating in Brentwood. Before that, Tri Delta Transit operated a bus route in Oakley in the early 1990s but it didn't do well.

=== 2001–present ===
In June 2002, Tri Delta Transit announced it will start its bus service to Bethel Island and Knightsen effective July 1, 2002. It is called route 381, the first of its kind in those communities. However, due to low ridership, this route was discontinued effective August 17, 2003. On August 18, 2003, Tri Delta Transit announced it started operating its weekday Delta Express bus service to the Dublin/Pleasanton BART station. In 2004, the ECCTA headquarters was expanded to include additional car space and more bus parking. In 2006, Tri Delta Transit aired a 30-second television commercial designed for East County viewers, named "We go everywhere". This ad comes with a Johnny Cash-inspired soundtrack that recites many of the places the agency's buses frequent.

In December 2008, It was announced that Tri Delta Transit will discontinue the Lawrence Livermore Lab route from the Delta Express, leaving Dublin/Pleasanton BART as the only route from the service. In late February 2009, Tri Delta Transit acquired its first Gillig Low Floor BRTs; this purchase of the new Gilligs marked the beginning of a multi-year plan to replace all buses currently in operation. In 2013, Tri Delta Transit announced it will auction off many of its buses that were replaced by the new ones. This included twenty-eight Gillig transit buses, three Dimes-A-Ride trolley buses and one MCI Delta Express motorcoach bus. They possibly also included 2006 Ford E-350 paratransit buses, office equipment and others. After the auction, all of ECCTA's auctioned buses were bought by Zacher's Auto Salvage in Harbor City, California.

In June 2018, Tri Delta Transit announced it purchased two new battery electric buses from Proterra, and another two from BYD in August 2018. The first two buses can carry up to 38 passengers, and another two buses can carry up to 32 passengers. The first two buses started operating in July 2018. On June 17, 2019, Tri Delta Transit launched Tri MyRide, an on-demand shuttle service that was originally located in Antioch and Oakley, as well as Pittsburg and Bay Point. The 6-month pilot program is being implemented in partnership with ECCTA and TransLoc. On August 10, 2025, Tri Delta Transit began operating its new, revitalized fixed-route service called "The New TDT Network". They included new 37x numbered routes, which operated both weekdays and weekends such as 370 and 373. Also, they put the Tri MyRide service into the Brentwood area, as well as the expanded Antioch-Oakley area.

== Overview of fixed-route service ==
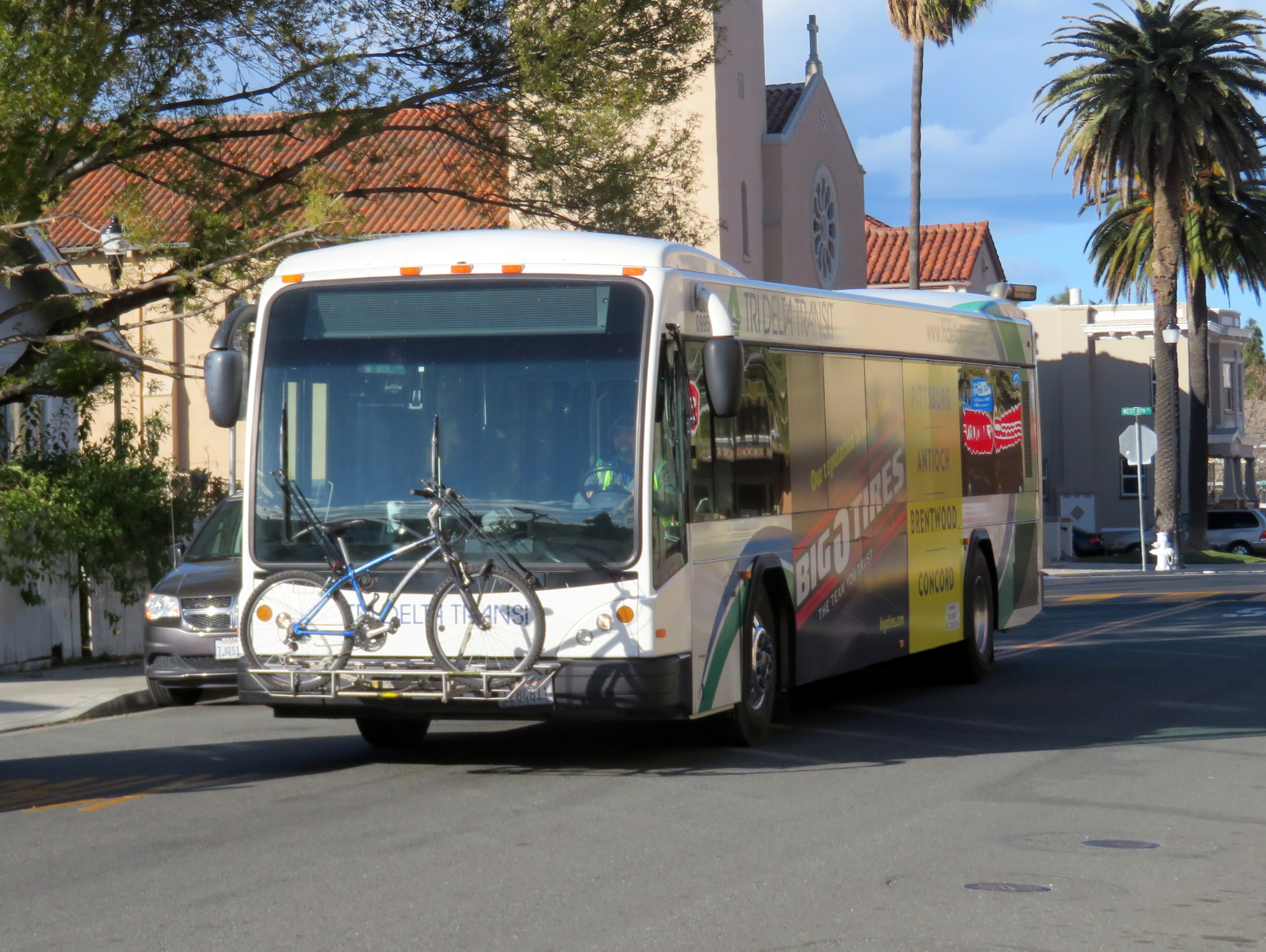
0995, a 2009 Gillig BRT in Pittsburg, later retired in 2023.

Tri Delta Transit operates in eastern Contra Costa County and has stops in Antioch, Oakley, Brentwood, Bay Point, Pittsburg, Martinez, and Concord. Tri Delta Transit operates local and express routes on weekdays and local routes on weekends and holidays.

=== Transfers ===
Intra-system transfer points for the majority of Tri Delta Transit's routes include:

- Brentwood Park & Ride in Brentwood
- Oakley Park & Ride in Oakley
- Antioch BART station in Antioch
- Pittsburg Center BART station in Pittsburg
- Pittsburg/Bay Point BART station in Pittsburg
- Los Medanos College in Pittsburg

In addition to transfers within Tri Delta Transit and to BART, riders may transfer to neighboring and long-distance public transportation systems at other stations, including:

- Antioch–Pittsburg station, via Route 371
  - Amtrak Gold Runner
- Concord BART, via Route 201X (weekdays)
  - County Connection
- Martinez station, via Route 200X (weekdays)
  - Amtrak California Zephyr, Coast Starlight, Gold Runner, and Capitol Corridor
  - County Connection
  - WestCAT

=== Route list ===
Tri Delta Transit operates thirteen bus routes on weekdays, serving the cities of Bay Point, Pittsburg, Antioch, Oakley, and Brentwood, with one route each connecting to Concord (201X) and Martinez (200X). Most routes parallel the San Joaquin River, running east and west; routes designated as "express" (200X, 201X) are designed with fewer stops and operate primarily during commute hours with limited mid-day service. Several routes share the same terminal points, but take different paths to provide service to communities both north and south of California State Route 4. For example, 370 and 371 both provide service between the Pittsburg/Bay Point and Antioch BART stations.

On the weekends and holidays, Tri Delta Transit operates eight of the thirteen routes throughout the ECCTA service area including the aforementioned cities with the exceptions of Concord and Martinez. Routes numbered 37x operate all week long, with reduced service frequencies on weekends and holidays.

Tri Delta Transit bus routes
Route	Westbound Terminal	Eastbound Terminal	Weekend service	Notes / Refs.
200X (Note: Operated since August 27, 2000 when it was 200.)	Martinez station (Amtrak)	Pittsburg/Bay Point BART	No	
201X (Note: Operated since 2007 when it was 201.)	Concord BART	Pittsburg/Bay Point BART	No	
360 (Note: Subset of legacy route 380, truncated at Los Medanos College (western terminus) and Antioch High School (eastern terminus). Limited service, with one trip each in the mornings and afternoons.)	Los Medanos College	Antioch High School	No	
361 (Note: Operated since August 2008 when it was 379.)	Antioch BART	Deer Valley & Dozier Libbey	No	
362 (Note: Operated since April 1, 2001 when it was 383.)	Blue Goose Park (Oakley Loop)		No	
370 (Note: Adopts aspects of legacy routes 388 & 390 west of Railroad Ave (Pittsburg), 387 & 390 between Railroad and Loveridge, 380 & 387 between Loveridge and Somersville, 387 between Somersville and G, and 380, 388, and 387 east of G. Runs on Leland west of Somersville, then Sycamore and 18th east of Somersville.)	Pittsburg/Bay Point BART	Antioch BART	Yes	
371 (Note: Adopts aspects of legacy routes 380 west of Railroad Ave (Pittsburg) and 388 east of Loveridge. Generally serves neighborhoods north of SR 4.)	Pittsburg/Bay Point BART	Antioch BART	Yes	
372 (Note: Largely replicates legacy route 387, with eastern terminus moved to Los Medanos College. Serves neighborhoods within Pittsburg.)	Pittsburg/Bay Point BART	Los Medanos College	Yes	
373	Antioch BART	Brentwood Park & Ride	Yes	
374	Bay Point	Pittsburg/Bay Point BART	Yes	
375	Antioch BART	Slatten Ranch Center	Yes	
376	Antioch BART	Kaiser Antioch Medical Center	Yes	
377	Antioch BART	Walmart Supercenter	Yes	

Discontinued Tri Delta Transit bus routes
Route	Westbound Terminal	Eastbound Terminal	Weekend service	Notes / Refs.
70 (Note: Route discontinued effective August 2008.)	3rd & Marina (Note: Operates loop service in Pittsburg via Buchanan and Harbor.)		No	
200 (Note: Renamed to 200X in 2022.)	Martinez station (Amtrak)	Wilbur & Cavallo Rd (Note: This location is the Tri Delta Transit headquarters.)	No	
201	Concord BART	Pittsburg/Bay Point BART	No	(Note: Renamed to 201X in 2022.)
202X (Note: Replaced by the Brentwood Tri MyRide service.)	Brentwood Park & Ride (Note: Operates loop service via Los Medanos College Brentwood Center.)		No	(Note: Operated from 2018 to 2025 when it was 202, renamed in 2022.)
300 (Note: Renamed to 300X in 2022.)	Pittsburg/Bay Point BART	Brentwood Park & Ride	No	
300X (Note: Consolidated with 391 and renumbered to 373, which offers more frequent service.)	Antioch BART	Brentwood Park & Ride	No	(Note: Operated from 2018 to 2025 when it was 300.) (Note: Designed for traditional commute, operating westbound in the mornings and eastbound in the afternoons.)
379 (Note: Renumbered to 361.)	Antioch BART	Antioch Medical Center	No	(Note: Operated from 2008 to 2025.) (Note: Operates during school days for Antioch Unified School District.)
380 (Note: Replaced by new route (360).)	Pittsburg/Bay Point BART	Wilbur & Cavallo Rd	Yes (Note: Operates on weekends from 2022 to 2024.)	(Note: Partially replaced by new route (370).)
381 (Note: Consolidated into new route (372).)	Pittsburg Marina	Los Medanos College	Yes	(Note: Operates service to Bethel Island and Knightsen from 2002 to 2003.) (Note: The second iteration of the route was operated from September 25, 2017 to 2025.)
383 (Note: Renumbered to 362.)	Hillcrest Park & Ride		No	(Note: Oakley Loop, operates from the Tri Delta Transit headquarters to Blue Goose Park until 2025.)
384 (Note: Consolidated into new routes 373 and 375.)	Antioch Park & Ride	Brentwood Park & Ride	No	(Note: The original iteration of the route was operated from 2004 to 2012, but it was reintroduced in 2018.) (Note: Operates from American Avenue to Brentwood Park & Ride from 2008 to 2012.)
385 (Note: Replaced by new routes 373, 375, and 376.)	Antioch Park & Ride	Brentwood Park & Ride	No	(Note: Operated from 2006 to 2025.)
386 (Note: Operated from 2006 to 2018.)	Brentwood Park & Ride	Discovery Bay Park & Ride	No	
387 (Note: Replaced by new route (372).)	Pittsburg/Bay Point BART	Wilbur & Cavallo Rd	No	
388	Pittsburg/Bay Point BART	Hillcrest Park & Ride	Yes	(Note: Operates loop from Antioch Medical Center until 2025.)
389 (Note: Replaced by new route (374).)	Pittsburg/Bay Point BART (Note: Operates loop service around via Bay Point.)		Yes	
390	Pittsburg/Bay Point BART	Hillcrest Park & Ride	No	(Note: Operates during commute hours.)
391 (Note: Renumbered to 373.)	Pittsburg/Bay Point BART	Brentwood Park & Ride	Yes	(Note: Operates service from Pittsburg Center BART from 2018 to 2025.)
392 (Note: This route was discontiuned in 2022.)	Pittsburg/Bay Point BART	Brentwood Park & Ride	Yes (no weekdays) (Note: Operates exclusively on weekends and holidays, no weekday service.)	
393	Mariners Cove Dr & Pacifica Ave	Hillcrest Park & Ride	Yes (no weekdays)	
394 (Note: Operated from 2007 to 2022.)	Pittsburg/Bay Point BART	Hillcrest Park & Ride	Yes (no weekdays)	
395 (Note: Discontinued in 2025 due to lower ridership.)	Antioch BART	The Streets of Brentwood	Yes (no weekdays)	(Note: Operated from October 6, 2012 to 2025.) (Note: Operates on weekdays from 2022 to 2024.)
396	Bay Point	Somersville Towne Center	Yes (no weekdays)	(Note: Operated from 2018 to 2022.)
709 (Note: Operated from 2021 to 2024.)	Pittsburg/Bay Point BART	Antioch BART	No	(Note: "Early Bird Express" operated as a westbound-only route by Tri Delta Transit before regular weekday eBART service starts at 5 a.m.; eliminated starting from June 10, 2024.)
0	West Pittsburg	Antioch City Hall	No	(Note: Loop, travels from Antioch City Hall, then to Oakley, then to Brentwood City Hall, then to Pittsburg, and ending in West Pittsburg.) (Note: First Tri Delta Transit route operated since it was incorporated in 1977.)
3xx	Oakley/Main Street		No	(Note: Oakley route, Operated from the early 1990s, but it was unsuccessful.)
Dimes-a-Ride (Note: Discontinued on February 26, 2012 along with the Delta Express.)	Grant & Highway 4		No	(Note: Operated from the 1990s to 2012.) (Note: Also operates Sand Creek loop from Brentwood Park & Ride from 2003 to 2004.)
Delta Express (Note: Operated from 2000 to 2012.)	Hillcrest Park & Ride	Lawrence Livermore Laboratory	No	(Note: Also operates service to Martinez from the mid 2000s and Dublin/Pleasanton BART from 2003 until its discontinuation.)
