= Pittsburg Center station =

Rapid transit station in San Francisco Bay Area

Pittsburg Center
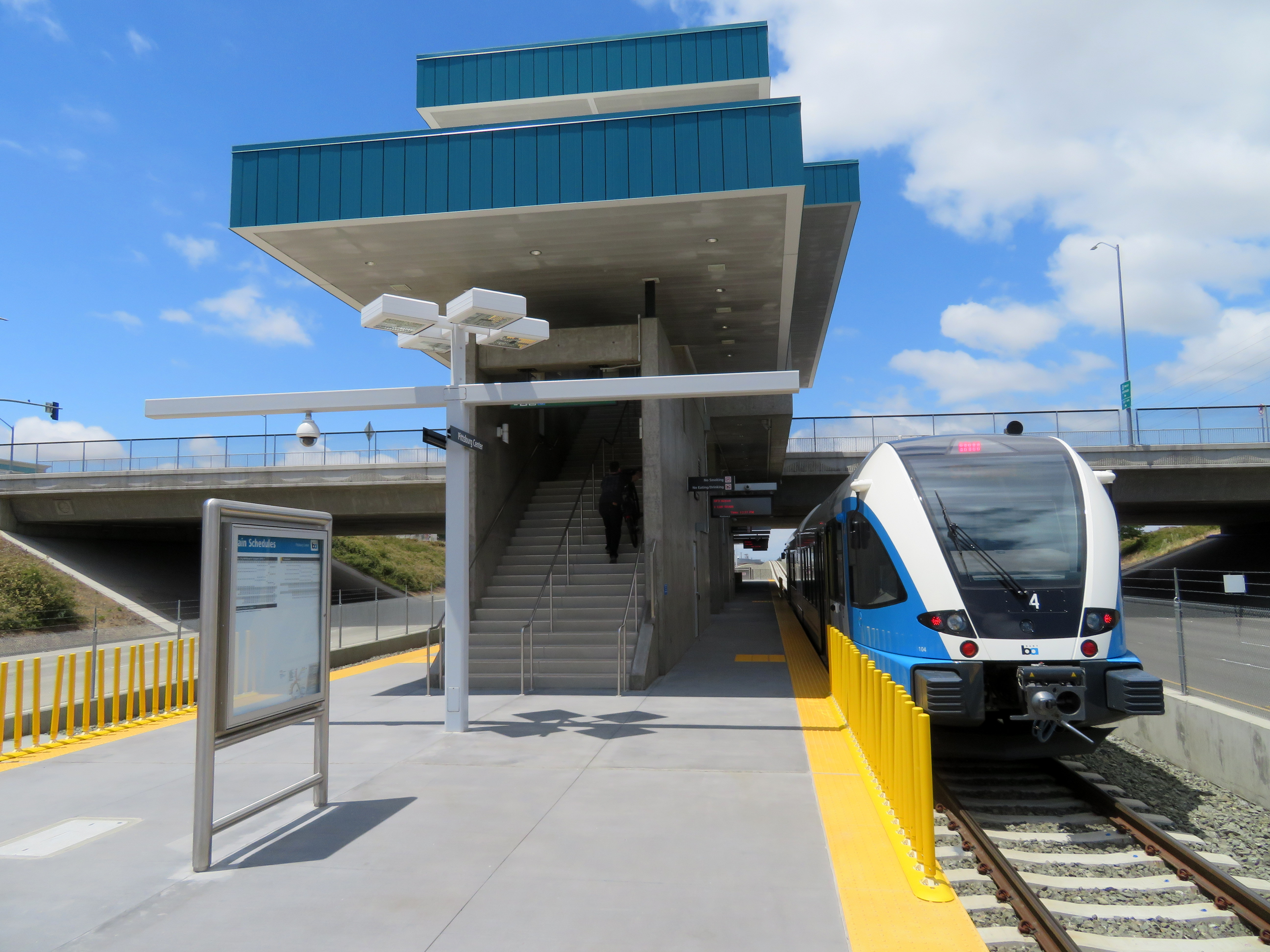
- Westbound train at Pittsburg Center in May 2018

General information
- Location: 2099 Railroad Avenue; Pittsburg, California
- Coordinates: 38.018227°N 121.890178°W
- Owner: San Francisco Bay Area Rapid Transit District
- Line: BART E-Line (eBART)
- Platforms: 1 island platform
- Tracks: 2
- Connections: Tri Delta Transit: 380, 381, 391

Construction
- Structure type: Trench cut
- Parking: 262 spaces
- Cycle facilities: Yes
- Accessible: Yes

Other information
- Station code: BART: PCTR

History
- Opened: May 26, 2018

Passengers
- 2025: 540 (weekday average)

Services
| Preceding station | Bay Area Rapid Transit | Following station |
|---|---|---|
| Pittsburg/Bay Point toward Millbrae or SFO via Pittsburg/Bay Point | Yellow Line (eBART) | Antioch Terminus |
Location

Pittsburg Center station is a Bay Area Rapid Transit station on the Yellow Line. It is located at the Railroad Avenue overpass of Highway 4 in Pittsburg, California and serves the downtown area of about one mile (1.6 km) away via connecting buses provided by Tri Delta Transit. There is no reserved parking available at this station.

== History ==
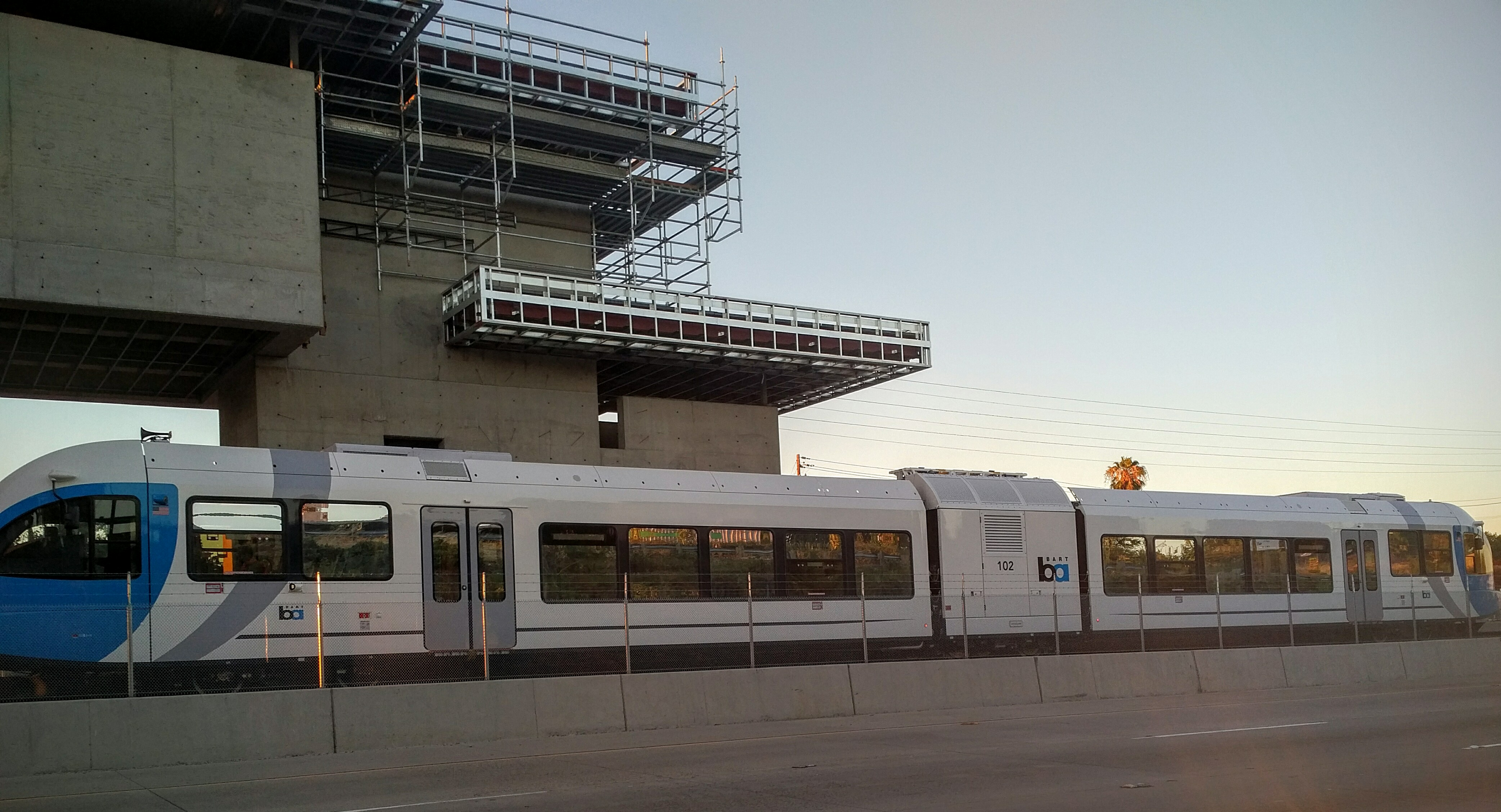
The station under construction in 2016

Construction of the station was uncertain at the time of eBART's approval due to lack of available funds. The station was originally known as Railroad Avenue during planning. The city later chose Pittsburg Civic Center, which BART rejected because of its similarity to Civic Center/UN Plaza station. In January 2015, the city accepted BART's proposal of Pittsburg Center.

Funding for the station was secured in early 2015 and was estimated at $11.9 million (equivalent to $16 million in 2025). Construction commenced on July 27, 2015, and was opened with the rest of the line on May 26, 2018.

As of November 2025, Pittsburg Center was the second-least-used station on the BART system, with 540 daily boardings. As of 2024, BART indicates "significant market, local support, and/or implementation barriers" that must be overcome to allow transit-oriented development on the surface parking lots at the station. Such development would not begin until at least the mid-2030s.
