= Bay Point, California =

Bay Point
- CDP
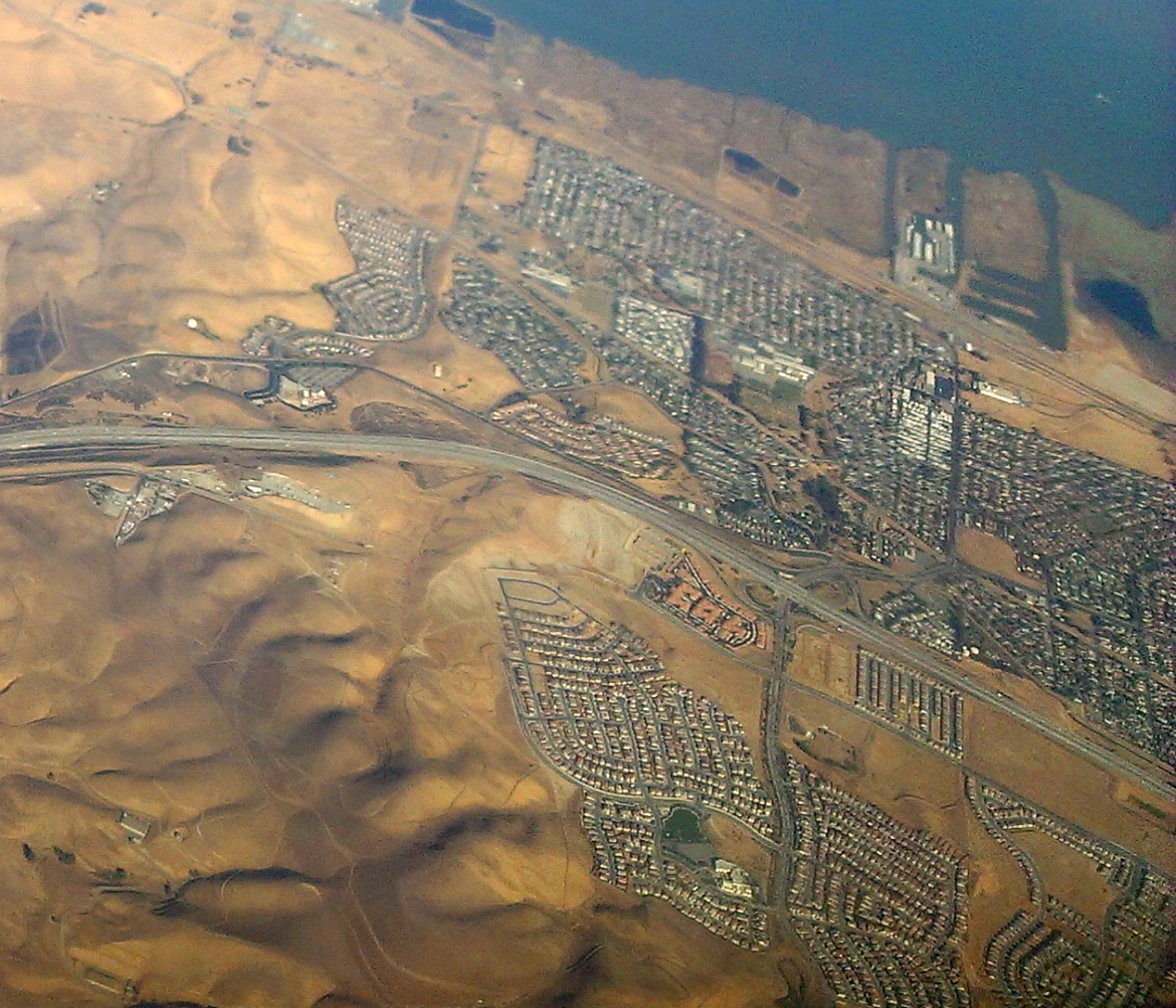
- Aerial view of Bay Point, facing approximately northwest.
- Interactive map of Bay Point
- Location in the United States
- Coordinates: 38°01′45″N 121°57′42″W
- Country: United States
- State: California
- County: Contra Costa

Government
  - State Senator: Tim Grayson (D)
  - State Assembly: Anamarie Avila Farias (D)
  - U. S. Congress: John Garamendi (D)

Area
  - Total: 7.44 sq mi (19.28 km^{2})
  - Land: 6.42 sq mi (16.64 km^{2})
  - Water: 1.02 sq mi (2.64 km^{2}) 11.7%
- Elevation: 89 ft (27 m)

Population (2020)
  - Total: 23,896
  - Density: 3,718.5/sq mi (1,435.74/km^{2})
- Time zone: UTC-8 (PST)
  - Summer (DST): UTC-7 (PDT)
- ZIP Code: 94565
- Area code: 925
- FIPS code: 06-04415
- GNIS feature IDs: 1853376, 2407808

Bay Point, formerly West Pittsburg and originally Bella Vista, is a census-designated place located in the East Bay region of the San Francisco Bay Area in Contra Costa County, California, United States. Bay Point is just west of Pittsburg and northeast of Concord on the southern shore of Suisun Bay. The population of Bay Point was 23,896 as of 2020. The Pittsburg/Bay Point Station of the Bay Area Rapid Transit (BART) rail system is located adjacent to Bay Point in Pittsburg. The community is traversed by State Route 4, the California Delta Highway, a controlled-access road. Being unincorporated, Bay Point does not have its own police department. The community is policed by the California Highway Patrol and the Contra Costa County Sheriff's Office. The ZIP Code is 94565, and the area code is 925.

== Geography ==
According to the United States Census Bureau, the CDP has a total area of 7.4 square miles (19 km^{2}), of which 88.3% is land and 11.7% is water. Bay Point borders Suisun Bay. The northwestern portion comprises the neighborhood of Shore Acres.

== Demographics ==
Historical population
Census	Pop.	Note	%±
2000	21,534		—
2010	21,349		−0.9%
2020	23,896		11.9%
U.S. Decennial Census 1850–1870 1880-1890; 1900 1910 1920; 1930 1940 1950; 1960 1970 1980 1990 2000 2010

Bay Point first appeared as a census-designated place in the 2000 United States census.

=== Racial and ethnic composition ===
Bay Point CDP, California – Racial and ethnic composition Note: the US Census treats Hispanic/Latino as an ethnic category. This table excludes Latinos from the racial categories and assigns them to a separate category. Hispanics/Latinos may be of any race.
Race / Ethnicity (NH = Non-Hispanic)	Pop 2000	Pop 2010	Pop 2020	% 2000	% 2010	% 2020
White alone (NH)	6,946	4,374	3,197	32.26%	20.49%	13.38%
Black or African American alone (NH)	2,633	2,330	2,186	12.23%	10.91%	9.15%
Native American or Alaska Native alone (NH)	157	77	58	0.73%	0.36%	0.24%
Asian alone (NH)	2,363	2,071	2,512	10.97%	9.70%	10.51%
Native Hawaiian or Pacific Islander alone (NH)	157	127	134	0.73%	0.59%	0.56%
Other race alone (NH)	77	40	137	0.36%	0.19%	0.57%
Mixed race or Multiracial (NH)	880	600	768	4.09%	2.81%	3.21%
Hispanic or Latino (any race)	8,321	11,730	14,904	38.64%	54.94%	62.37%
Total	21,534	21,349	23,896	100.00%	100.00%	100.00%

=== 2020 census ===
As of the 2020 census, Bay Point had a population of 23,896 and a population density of 3,718.6 inhabitants per square mile (1,435.8/km^{2}).

The median age was 33.2 years; 27.1% of residents were under age 18, 10.4% were 18 to 24, 30.1% were 25 to 44, 23.2% were 45 to 64, and 9.2% were 65 years of age or older. For every 100 females there were 98.6 males, and for every 100 females age 18 and over there were 97.3 males.

There were 6,867 households, of which 45.9% had children under the age of 18 living in them. Of all households, 48.2% were married-couple households, 8.3% were cohabiting couple households, 17.4% were households with a male householder and no spouse or partner present, and 26.1% were households with a female householder and no spouse or partner present. About 15.9% of all households were made up of individuals and 6.1% had someone living alone who was 65 years of age or older. The average household size was 3.47, and there were 5,333 families (77.7% of all households).

There were 7,039 housing units, of which 2.4% were vacant. The homeowner vacancy rate was 0.4% and the rental vacancy rate was 2.6%; 54.2% of occupied units were owner-occupied and 45.8% were occupied by renters.

The Census reported that 99.7% of the population lived in households, 0.2% lived in non-institutionalized group quarters, and 0.1% were institutionalized.

99.7% of residents lived in urban areas, while 0.3% lived in rural areas.

Racial composition as of the 2020 census
Race	Number	Percent
White	4,723	19.8%
Black or African American	2,301	9.6%
American Indian and Alaska Native	555	2.3%
Asian	2,581	10.8%
Native Hawaiian and Other Pacific Islander	154	0.6%
Some other race	10,369	43.4%
Two or more races	3,213	13.4%
Hispanic or Latino (of any race)	14,904	62.4%

== History ==
Bay Point was previously known by several names, including Bella Vista and, until 1993, West Pittsburg. An election was held in 1993 to vote on renaming the community Bay Point, reviving a historical name for a town to the west, later renamed Port Chicago. "West Pittsburg," the former name, was sometimes confused with the western unincorporated section of Pittsburg, California. Bay Point is similarly unincorporated.

=== Ambrose Park annexation ===
The neighboring City of Pittsburg annexed Ambrose Park in July 2008. Administrative control remained with the Ambrose Parks and Recreation District, which had owned and operated the site and its facilities since 1946. The move was designed to bring Pittsburg's greater development funding and general resources to a joint project to replace the long-time swimming pool facilities at the park. The new Ambrose Aquatic Center opened on July 4, 2016. By population, about 20% of the Ambrose Parks and Recreation District is within Pittsburg City limits. Ambrose Park features picnic, tennis, basketball and hiking, and picnic facilities in 12.3 acres (5.0 ha) of unincorporated land at 125 Memorial Way, immediately adjacent to the City of Pittsburg. It was a gift to the community from the local Enes family in 1947.

== Education ==
Most of Bay Point is in the Mount Diablo Unified School District. A small portion is in the Pittsburg Unified School District.

In 1940 the only grammar school was Ambrose Elementary, located on Willow Pass Road. The high school was in Pittsburg. A branch of the Contra Costa County Library is located in Bay Point at Riverview Middle School. Bay Point is served by the Mout Diablo Unified School District and has four public schools: Riverview Middle School (formerly Pacifica High School) for grades 6–8, Rio Vista Elementary School (formerly Riverview Middle School) for grades K-5, Shore Acres Elementary School for grades K-5 and Bel Air Elementary School for grades K-5.
