= California Affiliated Risk Management Authority =

California public agency

California Affiliated Risk Management Authority (CARMA) is a California public agency that aims to provide financial protection for its public entity members, including cities, towns, and special districts, against catastrophic loss. It was founded in 1993.

CARMA is an excess general liability pool consisting of six-member joint powers authorities (JPA), with over 160 underlying members. CARMA provides excess liability coverage of up to $35,500,000 per occurrence in the event of a catastrophic loss.
