= Doolittle =

Doolittle may refer to:

== Places ==
- Doolittle, Missouri, United States, a town
- Doolittle, Texas, United States, a census-designated place
- Doolittle Massif, Churchill Mountains, Antarctica
- Doolittle Bluff, Victoria Land, Antarctica

== Other uses ==
- Doolittle (surname)
- Doolittle (album), a 1989 album by Pixies
- Doolittles, a former Irish sandwich making company
- Doolittle (BART station), a Bay Area Rapid Transit station that will be constructed in Oakland, California

== See also ==
- Doolittle Raid, a World War II bombing raid on Tokyo led by Jimmy Doolittle
- Dolittle (disambiguation)
- Doctor Dolittle (disambiguation)
