= Bay Area Rapid Transit rolling stock =

Bay Area Rapid Transit Stock

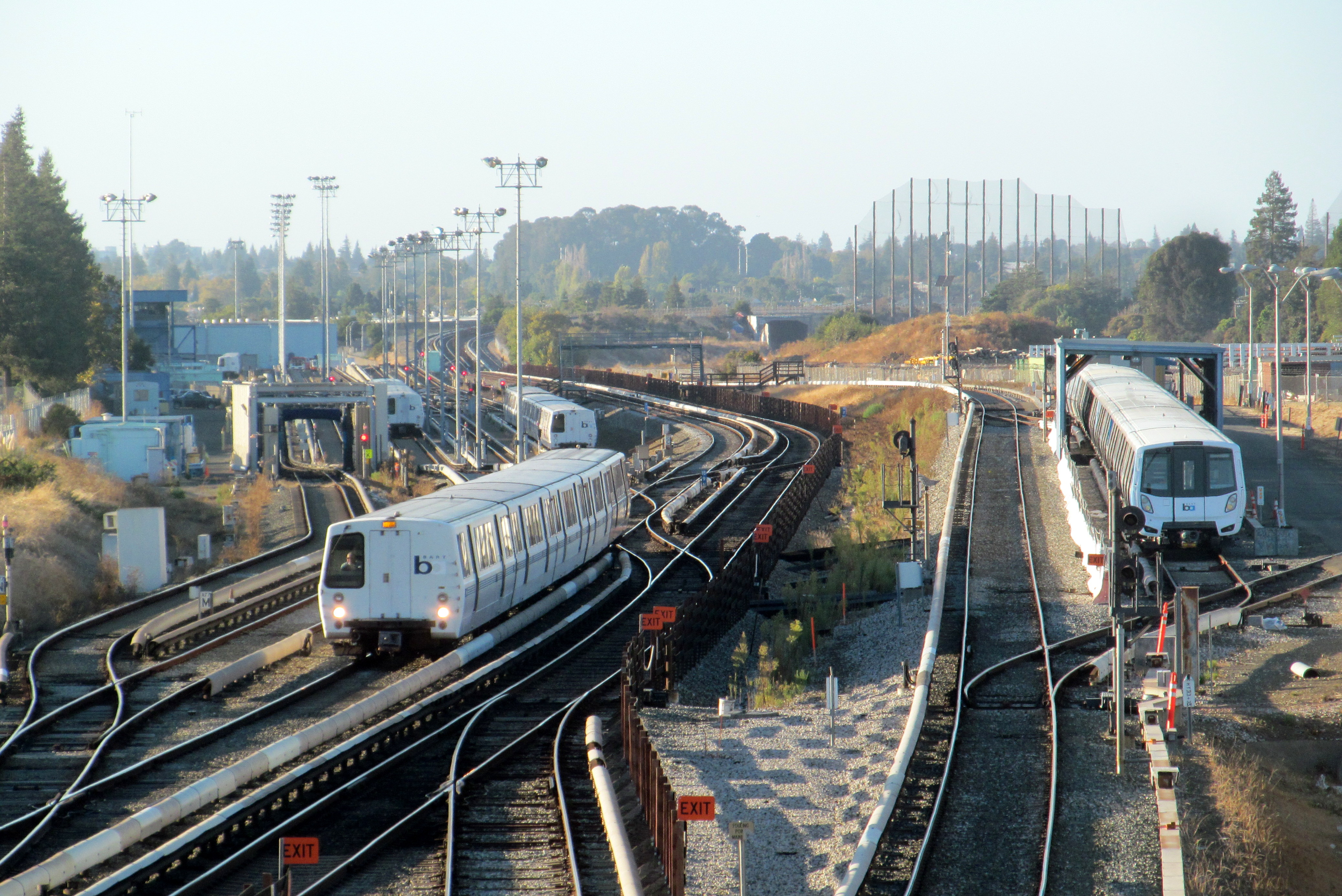
BART trains in the Hayward Yard in 2017

The rolling stock of the Bay Area Rapid Transit (BART) system consists of 782 self-propelled electric multiple units serving the main BART system, built in four separate orders, four permanent three-unit cable-car trainsets in a Cable Liner system connecting Oakland San Francisco Bay Airport, and eight Stadler GTW diesel multiple units on the eBART branch line.

Pre-pandemic, to run a typical peak morning commute, BART required 579 cars. Of those, 535 are scheduled to be in active service; most of the others are used to build up four spare trains (used to maintain on-time service). The remaining 90 cars are in for repair, maintenance, or some type of planned modification work. All trains on the separate automated guideway transit line are in regular use without spares. Alstom (originally Bombardier) is manufacturing a complete replacement of the mainline fleet. With the withdrawal and retirement of the older fleet, there will be 775 vehicles in total, with long-term goals of eventually increasing this to 1,200 cars.

The automated guideway transit line utilizes off-the-shelf cable car technology developed by Doppelmayr Cable Car: the Cable Liner. The eBART extension was constructed to more traditional specifications and uses Stadler GTW articulated diesel multiple units previously utilized in other systems.

The mainline track gauge is 5 ft 6 in (1,676 mm), significantly wider than the 4 ft 8 1/2 in (1,435 mm) standard gauge used on the national passenger and freight railroads and most rapid transit systems in North America. In the past it also used flat-edge rail, rather than typical rail that angles slightly inward. These factors have complicated maintenance of the system, as it requires custom wheelsets, brake systems, and track maintenance vehicles. Stations have a platform height of 39 inches (991 mm). A full consist, which will fill the system's platforms, is ten units, equaling 700 feet (213 m). BART trains are unique among American rapid transit systems as they have proper gangway connections and passengers are permitted to walk between cars, but it is not an open gangway system.

The legacy fleet was removed from regular service on September 11, 2023, but BART kept some cars as a reserve fleet for occasional use. The final operation of the legacy cars was at a decommissioning ceremony on April 20, 2024.

== Original (legacy) fleet ==
=== A and B series ===
A Car
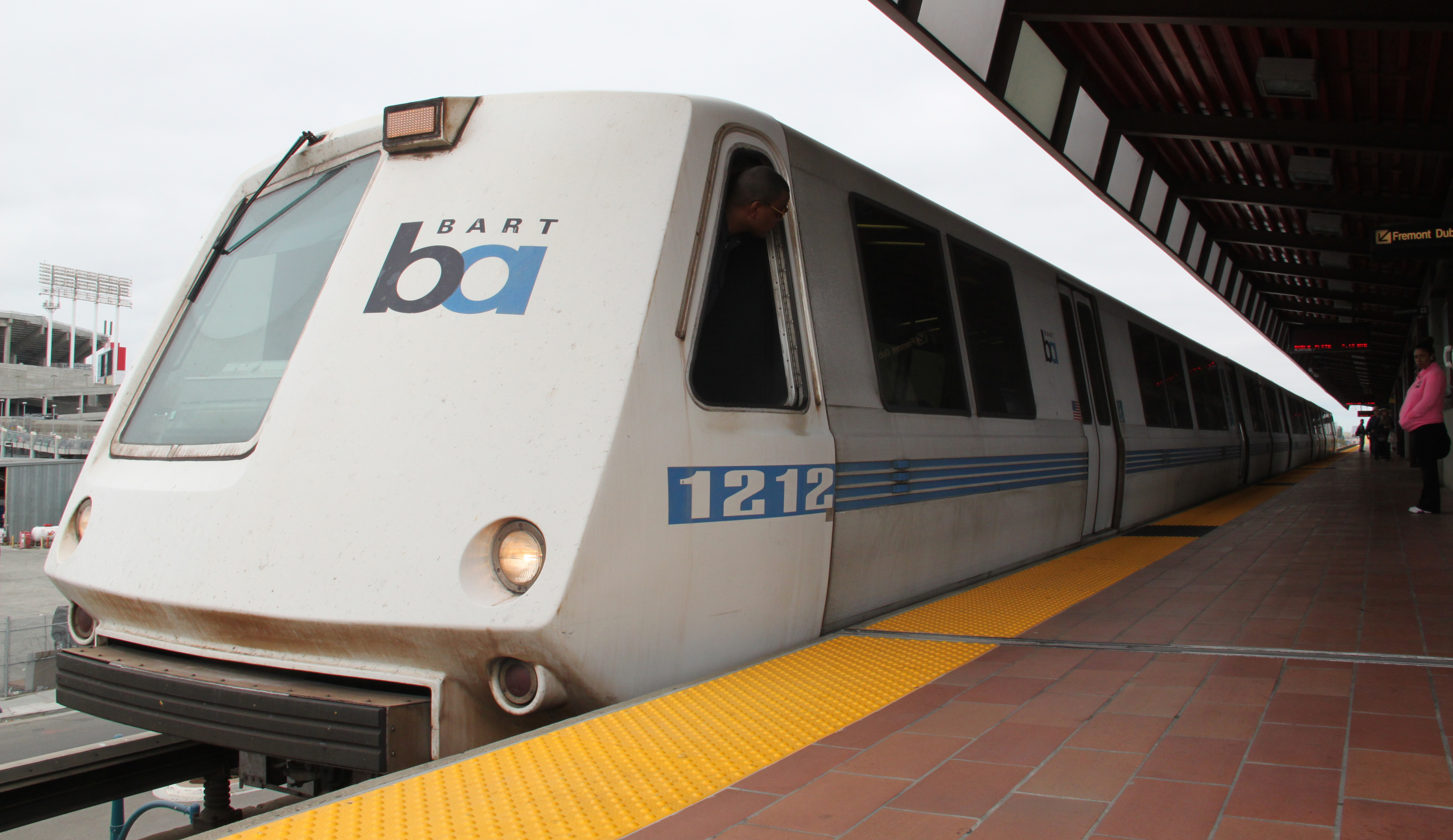
- In service: 1972–2024
- Manufacturer: Rohr, Inc.
- Constructed: 1968–1975
- Entered service: 1972
- Refurbished: 1998–2002, 2014
- Scrapped: 2020–2024
- Number built: 176 (Note: 113 converted to B-2 cars)
- Number preserved: 1
- Number scrapped: 153
- Fleet numbers: 1164–1276 (non-inclusive) (Note: originally 101–276)
- Capacity: 60 (seated); 200 (crush load)
- Operator: 1
- Depots: Colma Yard; Concord Yard; Hayward Complex; Richmond Yard

Specifications
- Car length: 75 ft (23 m)
- Width: 10.5 ft (3.2 m)
- Height: 10.5 ft (3.2 m)
- Floor height: 39 in (990 mm)
- Entry: level
- Doors: 4
- Maximum speed: 80 mph (130 km/h)
- Weight: 63,067 lb (28,607 kg)
- Traction system: Westinghouse chopper control (original); Adtranz IGBT−VVVF (refurbish)
- Traction motors: WH 1463B DC (original); Adtranz 1507C asynchronous 3-phase AC (refurbish)
- Acceleration: 3.0 mph/s (4.8 km/(h⋅s))
- HVAC: Thermo King (original); Westcode (refurbish)
- Electric systems: Third rail, 1 kV DC
- Current collection: contact shoe
- UIC classification: Bo’Bo’
- AAR wheel arrangement: B-B
- Minimum turning radius: 120 m (390 ft)
- Coupling system: WABCO N -3
- Track gauge: 5 ft 6 in (1,676 mm)

B Car
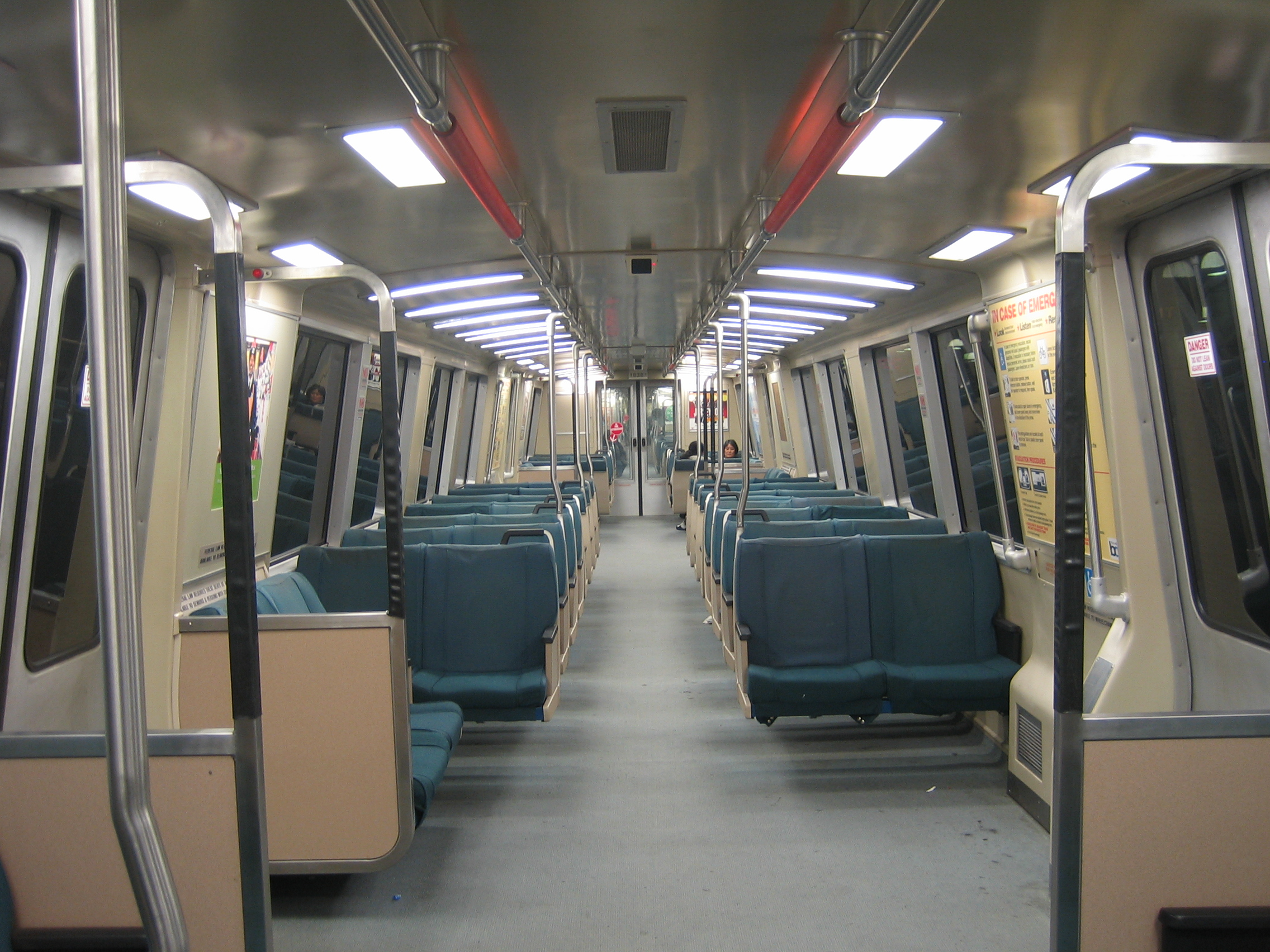
- Manufacturers: Rohr, Inc.
- Constructed: 1971–1975
- Refurbished: 1998–2002
- Scrapped: 2019–2024
- Number built: 274
- Number preserved: 1
- Number scrapped: 258
- Fleet numbers: 1501–1913
- Capacity: 60 (seated); 200 (crush load)

Specifications
- Car length: 70 ft (21 m)
- Weight: 61,410 lb (27,860 kg)

Notes/references
- Same specifications as A cars except where noted

The A and B cars were built from 1968 to 1975 by Rohr Industries, an aerospace manufacturing company that had recently started mass-transit equipment manufacturing. The first of these cars were delivered in 1970. The A cars were designed as leading or trailing cars only, with an aerodynamic fiberglass operator's cab housing train control equipment and BART's two-way communication system, and extending 5 feet (1.52 m) longer than the B-cars. A and B cars can seat 60 passengers comfortably, and under crush load, carry over 200 passengers. B cars have no operator's cab and are used in the middle of trains to carry passengers only. However, since each car is self-propelled, the B cars do have hostler controls allowing manual control as single units at low speeds inside a yard.

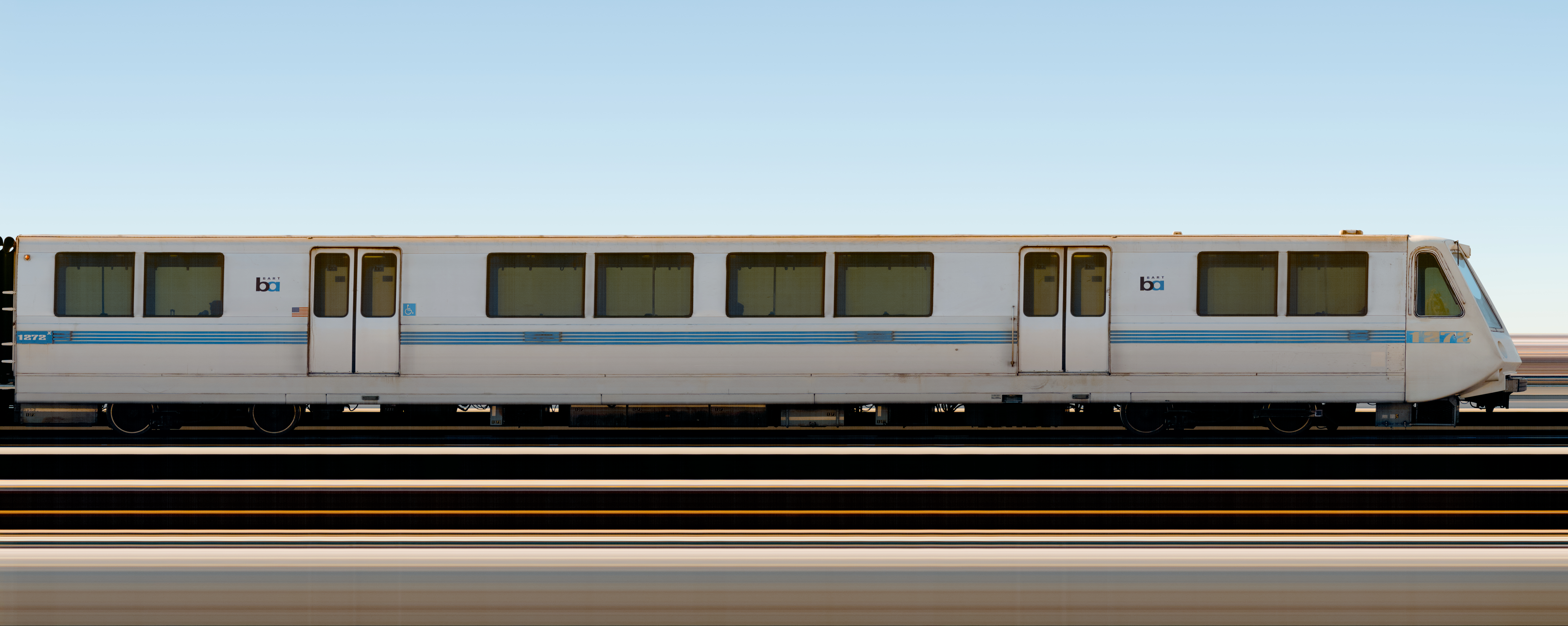
Side view of BART A car showing the aerodynamic fiberglass operator's cab.

As early as 1978, BART realized that it had ordered too many A cars, which were unable to operate in the middle of train, and too few B cars. Over time, about 113 A cars (about 2/3 of the A car fleet) were converted into B cars by removing their fiberglass cabs and installing the inter-car connection equipment.

BART previously operated 56 A cars and 341 B cars, and following their retirement on April 20, 2024, regular service will be of new cars only. To be able to maintain the vehicles until they are taken out of service, the workshop regularly procures computers on the second-hand market that can still address the old systems. Since the first series were newly designed, they had very few standard components, making them difficult to maintain.

=== C series ===
C1 Car
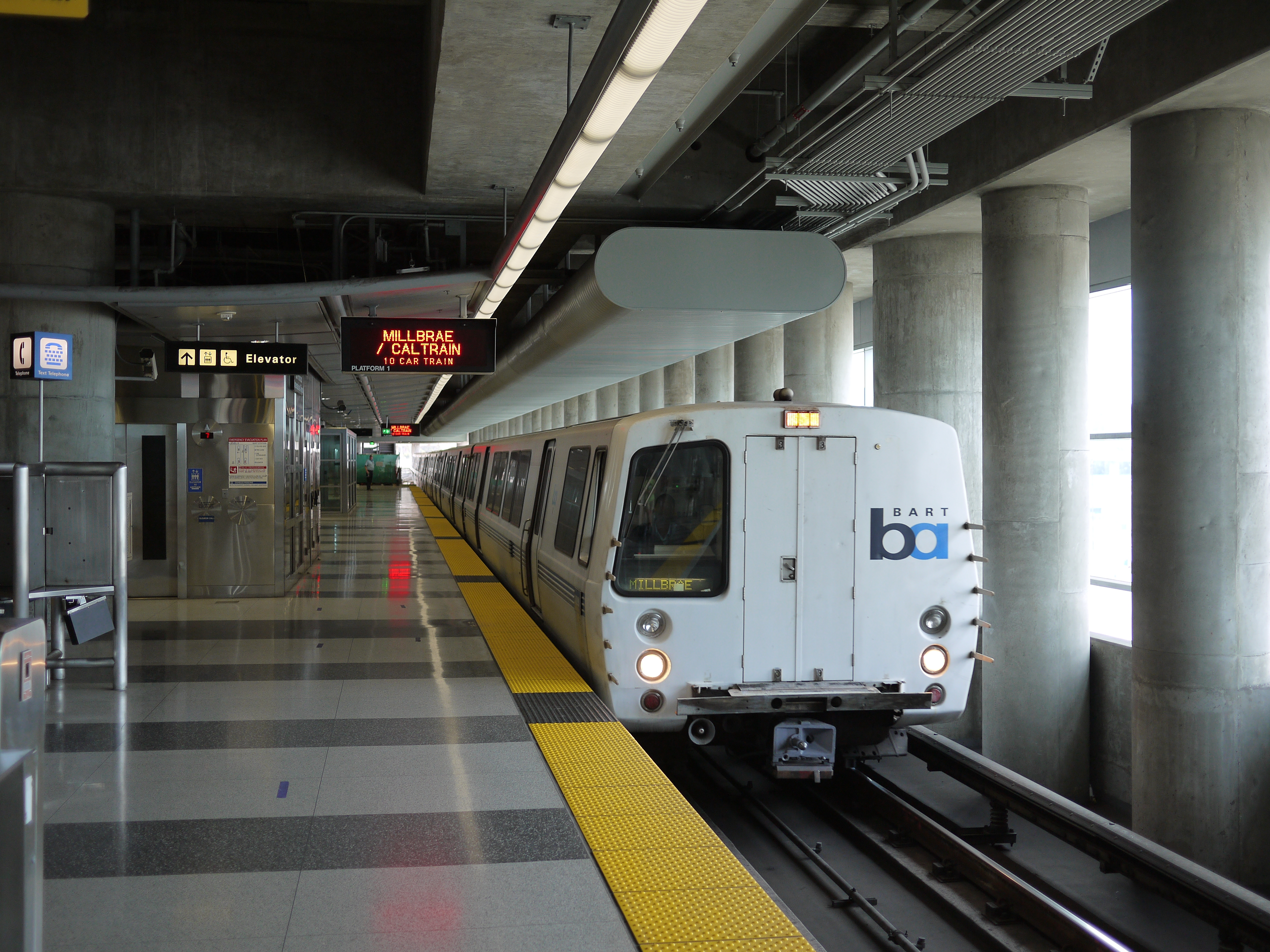

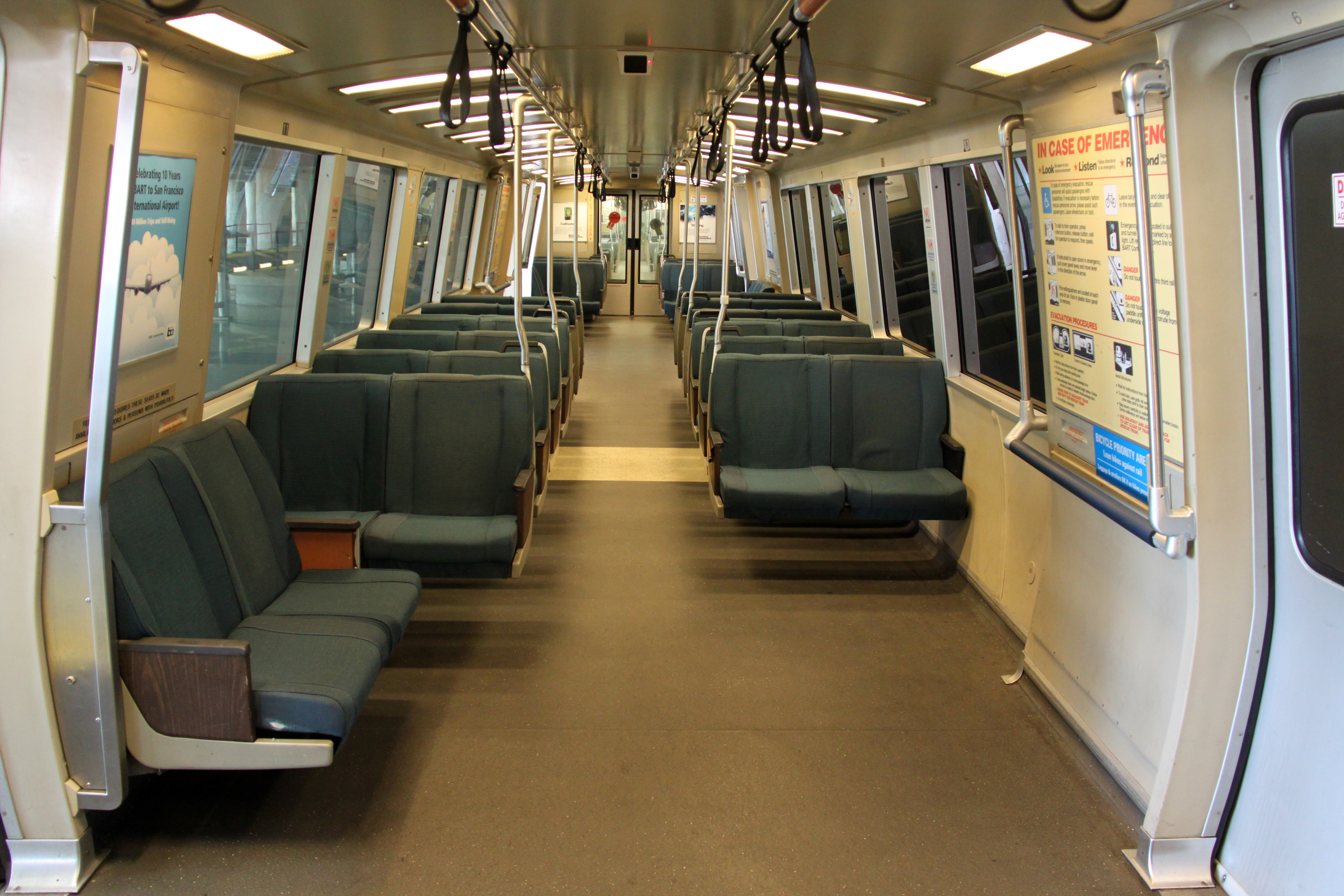
- Manufacturer: Alstom
- Constructed: 1987–1989
- Scrapped: 2019–2023
- Number built: 150
- Number preserved: 2
- Number scrapped: 148
- Fleet numbers: 301–450
- Capacity: 56 (seated); 200 (crush load)

Specifications
- Weight: 63,000 lb (29,000 kg)
- Traction system: Westinghouse chopper control
- Traction motors: WH 1463B DC

Notes/references
- Same specifications as B cars except where noted

C2 Car
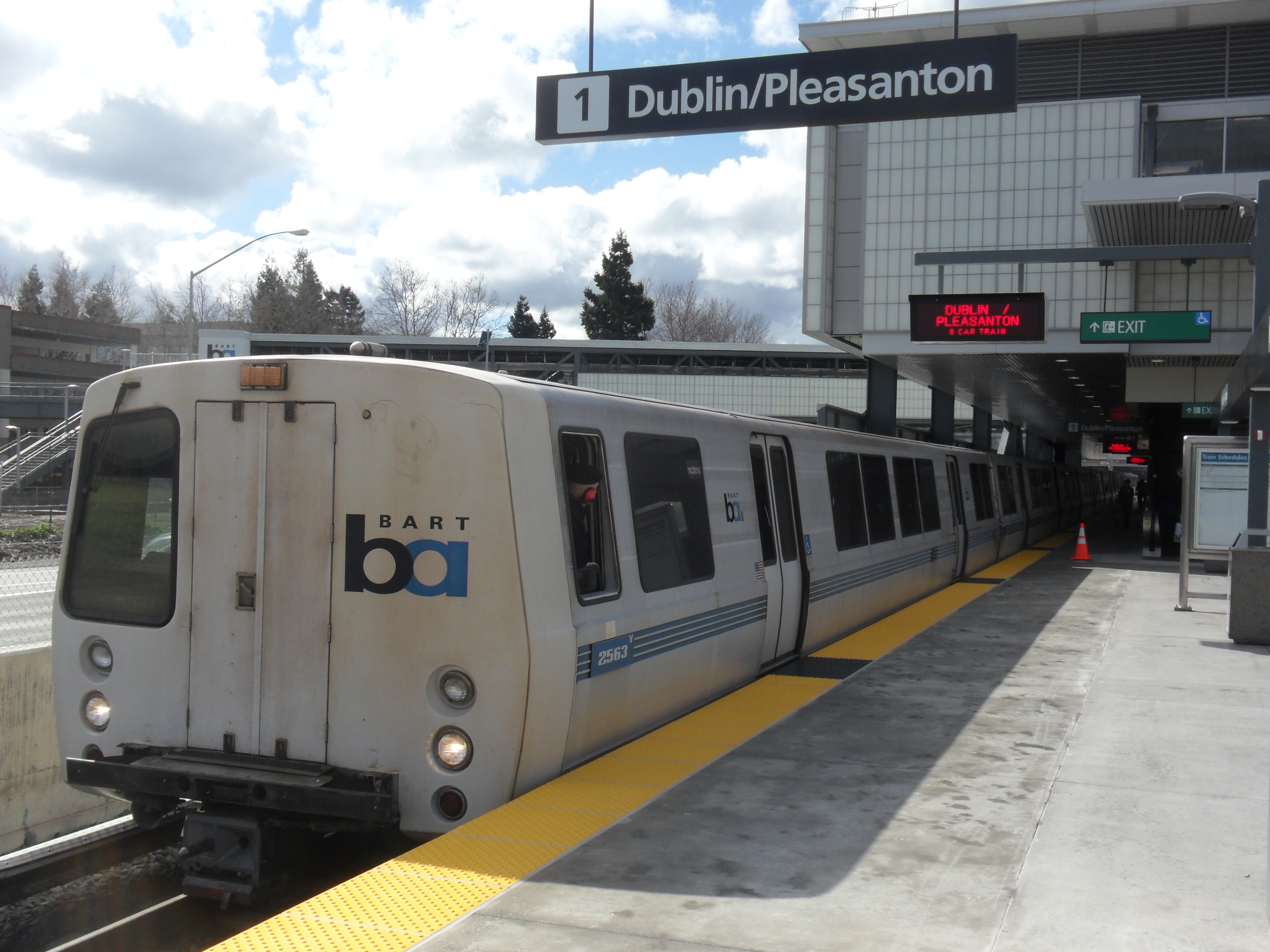

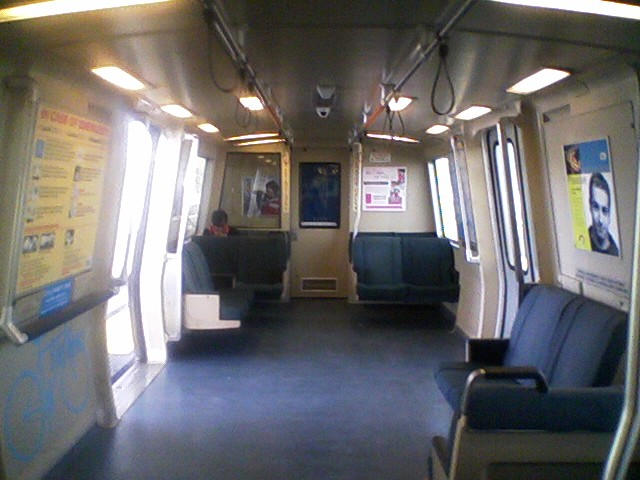
- A demonstration car (modified C2 car) with accommodations for both wheelchairs and bicycles. This car also has hand straps.
- Manufacturer: Morrison–Knudsen
- Constructed: 1994–1996
- Scrapped: 2019–2021
- Number built: 80
- Number scrapped: 80
- Fleet numbers: 2501–2580

Notes/references
- Same specifications as C1 cars except where noted

Just as BART had realized in the mid-1970s that it had ordered too many A cars, it also learned that it took more time than desired to change the length of a train. BART had originally planned to bring trains into yards after the morning rush and remove B cars to shorten the trains for midday service, before returning them to yards again to add cars for the evening rush. Ultimately this procedure resulted in long downtimes and increased the number of operators needed.

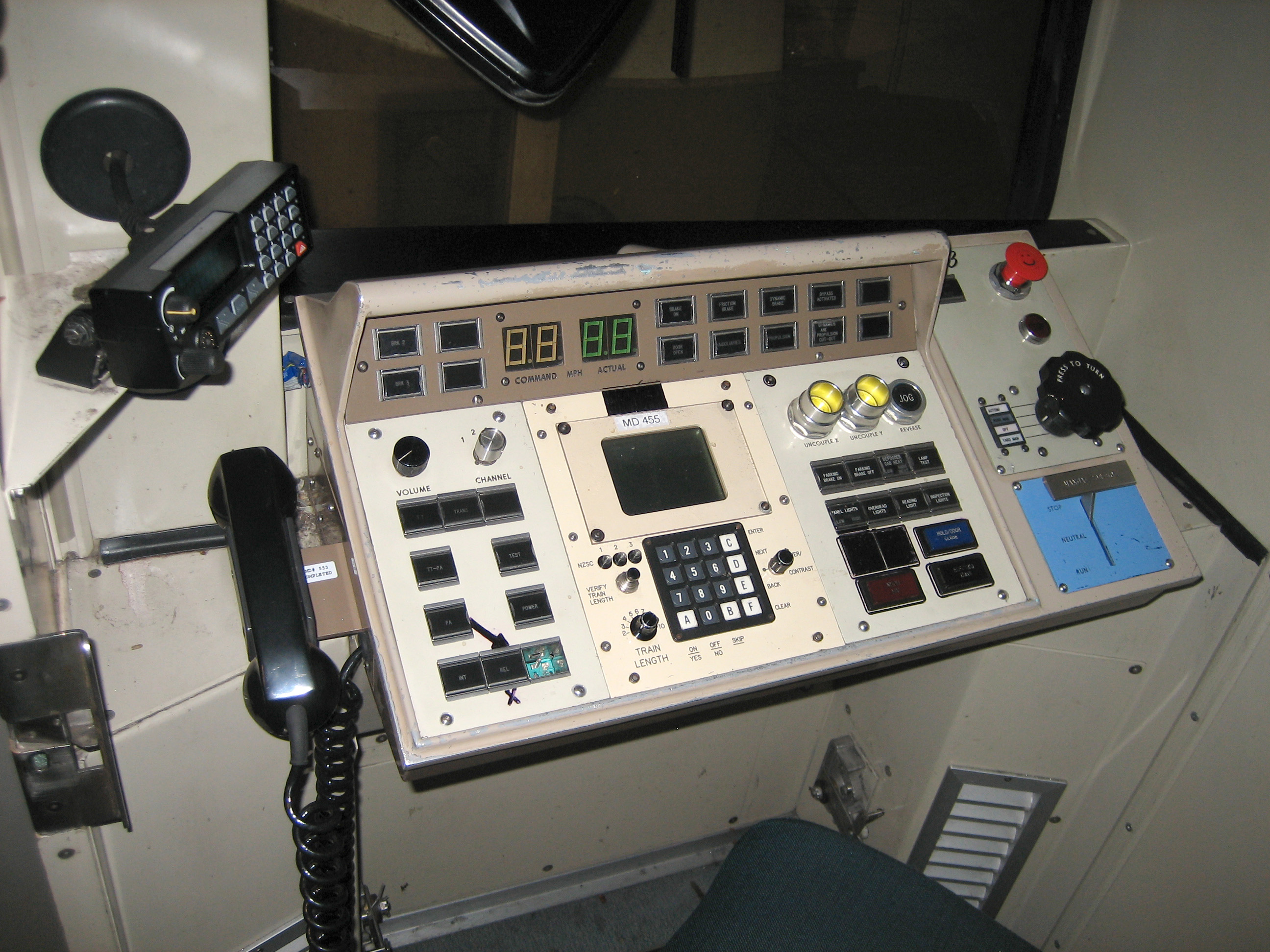
The control panel in a C car

BART's solution to both issues was a new design, the C car. A C car has an operator’s cab like an A car but can also be used as an intermediate car like a B car. When placed in the middle of a train consist, the operator's cab is closed off and a door in the nose opens, allowing passengers to pass through to the next car (always another C car). This allowed BART to make one long train that could quickly break into two trains outside of a yard. Crews could also do the reverse and make one long train from two shorter consists. To add the operator’s cab while maintaining the same length as a B car, the C cars could only seat 56 passengers (a loss of four seats).

The first order of C cars, referred to as the C1 cars, were built by Alstom between 1987 and 1989. The second order of C cars, called the C2 cars, were built by Morrison-Knudsen (with shells built by Linke-Hofmann-Busch) from 1994 to 1996. At the time of their construction, the C2 cars featured flip-up seats which could be folded to accommodate wheelchair users; these seats were later removed during refurbishment.

The C cars had a bright white segment as the final approximately two feet (61 cm) of the car at their cab end.

=== Refurbishments ===
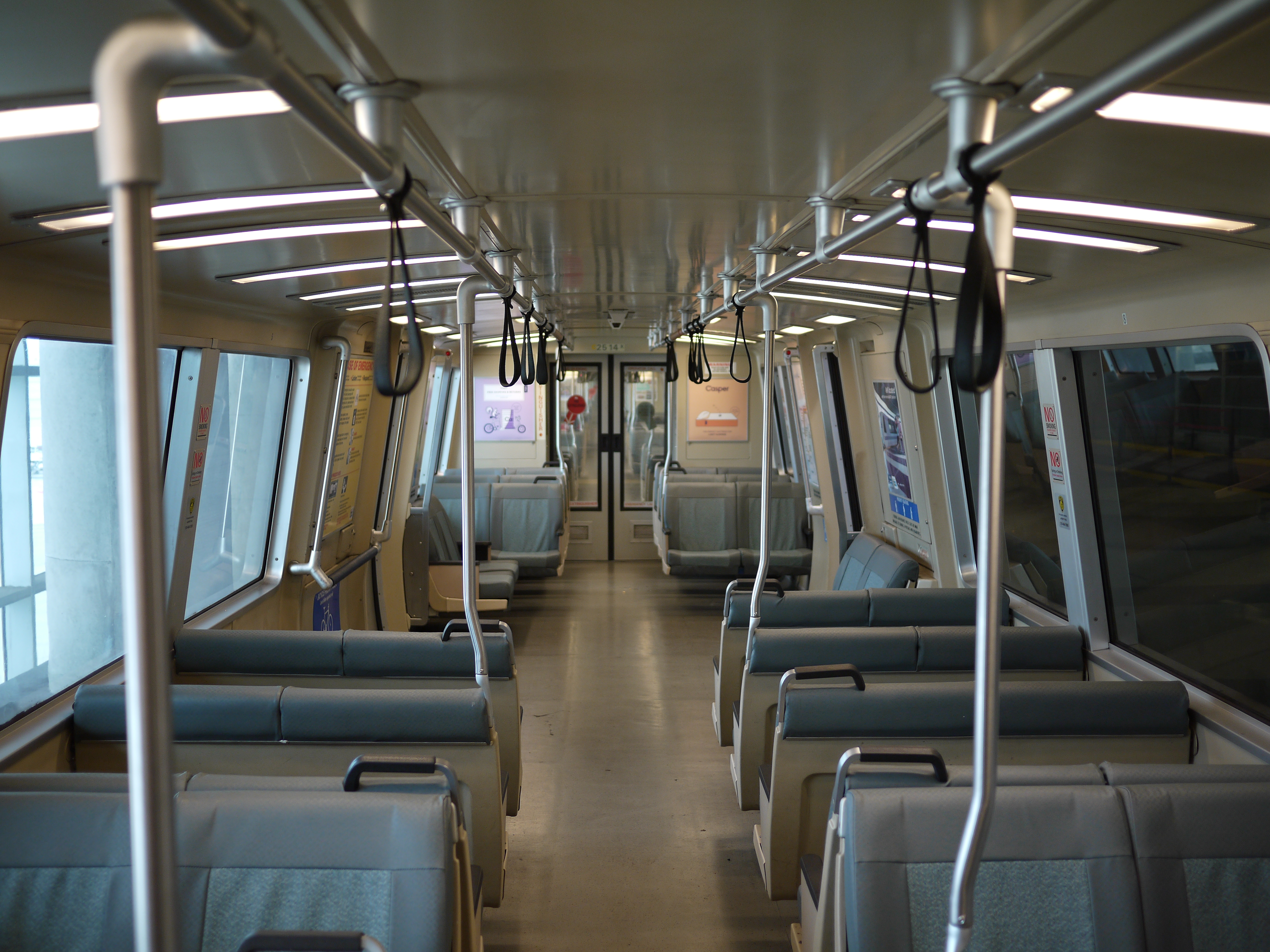
Interior of a C car with upgraded spray-on composite flooring

After about 25 years in service, the A and B car fleet was rebuilt, using lessons learned when building the C cars, and the advances in technology since then. Among the changes were a conversion from DC to AC propulsion (detailed below), rebuilt trucks and suspension, and a complete cleaning and repair to the exterior and interior of the cars. The work was done between 1998 and 2002 at first by Pittsburg, California-based ADtranz and later by Bombardier which acquired the company in 2001.

A cars, (fleet numbers 101–276) were either rebuilt while retaining their cab (and renamed A2 cars, fleet numbers 1164–1276), or rebuilt without a cab (converted into B2 cars, fleet numbers 1838–1913). B cars (fleet numbers 501–774, 801–837) were rebuilt into B2 cars (fleet numbers 1501–1774, 1801–1837).

Because one of the original design goals was for all BART riders to be seated, the older cars had fewer provisions such as grab bars for standing passengers. In the late 2000s BART began modifying some of the C2 cars to test features such as hand-straps and additional areas for luggage, wheelchairs and bicycles. These new features were later added to the A, B, and C1 cars.

Prior to 2012, all BART cars featured upholstered seats. It was reported in 2011 that several strains of molds and bacteria were found on fabric seats on BART trains, even after wiping with antiseptic. These included bacteria from fecal contamination. In April, BART announced it would spend $2 million in the next year to replace the dirty seats. The new seats would feature vinyl-covered upholstery which would be easier to clean. The transition to the new seats was completed in December 2014.

Originally all the cars had carpeted flooring. Due to similar concerns regarding cleanliness, the carpeting in all of the cars was removed. The A and B, and C2 cars featured vinyl flooring in either grey or blue coloring, while the C1 cars featured a spray-on composite flooring.

=== Traction motors ===
Prior to rebuilding, the Direct Current (DC) traction motors used on the 439 Rohr BART cars were Model 1463B with chopper from Westinghouse, who also built the automatic train control system for BART. The Rohr cars were rebuilt with ADtranz model 1507C 3-phase alternating current (AC) traction motors with insulated-gate bipolar transistor (IGBT) inverters. The Westinghouse motors were retained on the Alstom C (C1) and Morrison-Knudsen C2 cars and the motors that were removed from the Rohr cars were kept as spares. Cars have a starting acceleration of 3.0 mph/s or 4.8 km/(h⋅s) and are capable of holding that acceleration up to 31 mph (50 km/h). Residual acceleration at 80 mph (130 km/h) is 0.78 mph/s or 1.26 km/(h⋅s). Braking rates range from 0.45 mph/s or 0.72 km/(h⋅s) up to 3.0 mph/s or 4.8 km/(h⋅s) (full service rate).

The HVAC systems on the Rohr BART cars before rehabilitation were built by Thermo King, when it was a subsidiary of Westinghouse. The current HVAC systems on the rebuilt Rohr-built Gen 1 cars were built by Westcode and possibly also ADtranz who had subcontracted the HVAC system to Westcode.

=== Noise ===
Many BART passengers have noted that the system is noisy, with a 2010 survey by the San Francisco Chronicle measuring up to 100 decibels (comparable to the noise level of a jackhammer) in the Transbay Tube between San Francisco and Oakland, and still more than 90 decibels in 23 other locations. According to BART, the noise in the tunnel used to be "compared to banshees, screech owls, or Doctor Who's TARDIS run amok".

However, then-chief BART spokesperson Linton Johnson stated that BART averages 70–80 dB, below the danger zone, and according to a 1997 study by the National Academy of Sciences, BART ranks as among the quietest transit systems in the nation. Critics have countered that this study analyzed straight, above-ground portions of different systems throughout the country at 30 mph (48 km/h), which is not representative of actual operating conditions. Much of BART is under ground and curvy, even in the Transbay Tube, and has much higher peak operating speeds than many other systems in the country.

Train noise on curves is caused by the wheels slipping along the rails. This slippage also causes noise and surface damage called corrugation. The process by which the noise and corrugation occur is:

1. Pairs of wheels are attached to one another with an axle such that they must have the same rotational speed, but on a curve the distances the outer and inner wheels travel are different. As a result, the wheels must slip along the rails.
2. This slippage causes the wheel and track to wear and become uneven (corrugated).
3. This corrugation causes more noise and corrugation, not only in the original location but elsewhere in the system.

In 2015, after replacing 6,500 feet (1,981 m) and grinding down (smoothing) 3 miles (4.8 km) of rail in the tube, BART reported a reduction of noise there and positive feedback from riders. BART also announced that the new train cars expected to enter service in December 2016 (see below) will be quieter, thanks to "'micro-plug' doors [that] help seal out noise".

=== Decommissioning ===
If Federal Transit Administration funds were used in the purchase of a vehicle and that vehicle is deemed to have a value over $5,000 at the time of sale, the FTA is entitled to a reimbursement proportional to its contribution to that vehicle when it was initially bought. This applies even if the car is donated free of charge.

The older cars began retirement in November 2019 when car 2528 – a C2 car – was the first released from BART ownership. The car had been removed from service in 2014, by which time it had run two million miles (3,200,000 km) and was held in reserve for spare parts. Four additional C2 cars, three B2 cars, and two C1 cars (totalling ten cars) were also sent to the Schnitzer Steel facility in Oakland to be evaluated and recycled.

BART strategically targeted the C2 cars to be the first in the legacy fleet to be completely decommissioned. The C2 cars had a multitude of issues including HVAC units that were the most likely in the fleet to break down, passenger doors that would often come off their tracks, and operator cabs with windows that would frequently fail and windshield wipers that would become stuck. By August 2021, all 80 of the C2 cars had been scrapped. Starting in late 2021, BART targeted the remaining C1 cars for decommissioning. By June 2023, all C1 cars had been decommissioned, and by May 2024, all but two cars had been scrapped, with only one remaining on the property. The surviving cars are 329, currently at the Western Railway Museum, and 323, which is owned by the Hayward Fire Department, who has placed it on a section of elevated trackage at their training center on the southern portion of the Hayward Executive Airport.

The decommissioning of the legacy fleet was complete by September 11, 2023, by which point they no longer operated as part of regularly scheduled operations. However, the agency kept legacy cars on hand for occasional supplement service, such as on days with major events or during a service disruption. Due to reduced ridership in the wake of the COVID-19 pandemic in the United States, full-length trains did not typically fill up, so BART chose to retire the legacy fleet and operate shorter trains with the intention of cutting costs and improving user experience. BART hosted a retirement ceremony for the legacy fleet on April 20, 2024, with trains running on the MacArthur–Fremont segment (the first segment of BART to open). This was the final revenue operation of the A, B, and C cars.

=== Preservation ===
In March 2022, BART announced eight finalists for receipt of decommissioned cars. Planned reuses include a short-term rental, bars, and a training facility for firefighters in Hayward. While systems such as the Chicago Transit Authority and New York City Transit Authority have retained some retired railcars as part of a "heritage fleet" that operates on charters and special occasions, BART has stated such a fleet would not be feasible due to the cars' incompatibility with the newer CBTC system, as well as limited yard space to store them and the obsolete components needed to maintain them. Thus, BART has instead opted to donate their historic cars to the Western Railway Museum, giving them one each of the A, B, and C1 cars, as well as other historic components which are to eventually be featured in the museum's planned Rapid Transit History Center. The museum received the first legacy car, A2 car no. 1164 on August 9, 2024, followed by B2 car no. 1834 on September 11, and finally, C1 car no. 329 on October 4, 2024.

Side view of nine-car BART C1 train. The flat nose of the C series, such as cars 349, 343, 330, and 315 in this image, allows them to be used as middle cars.

== Fleet of the Future (D and E series) ==
D Car
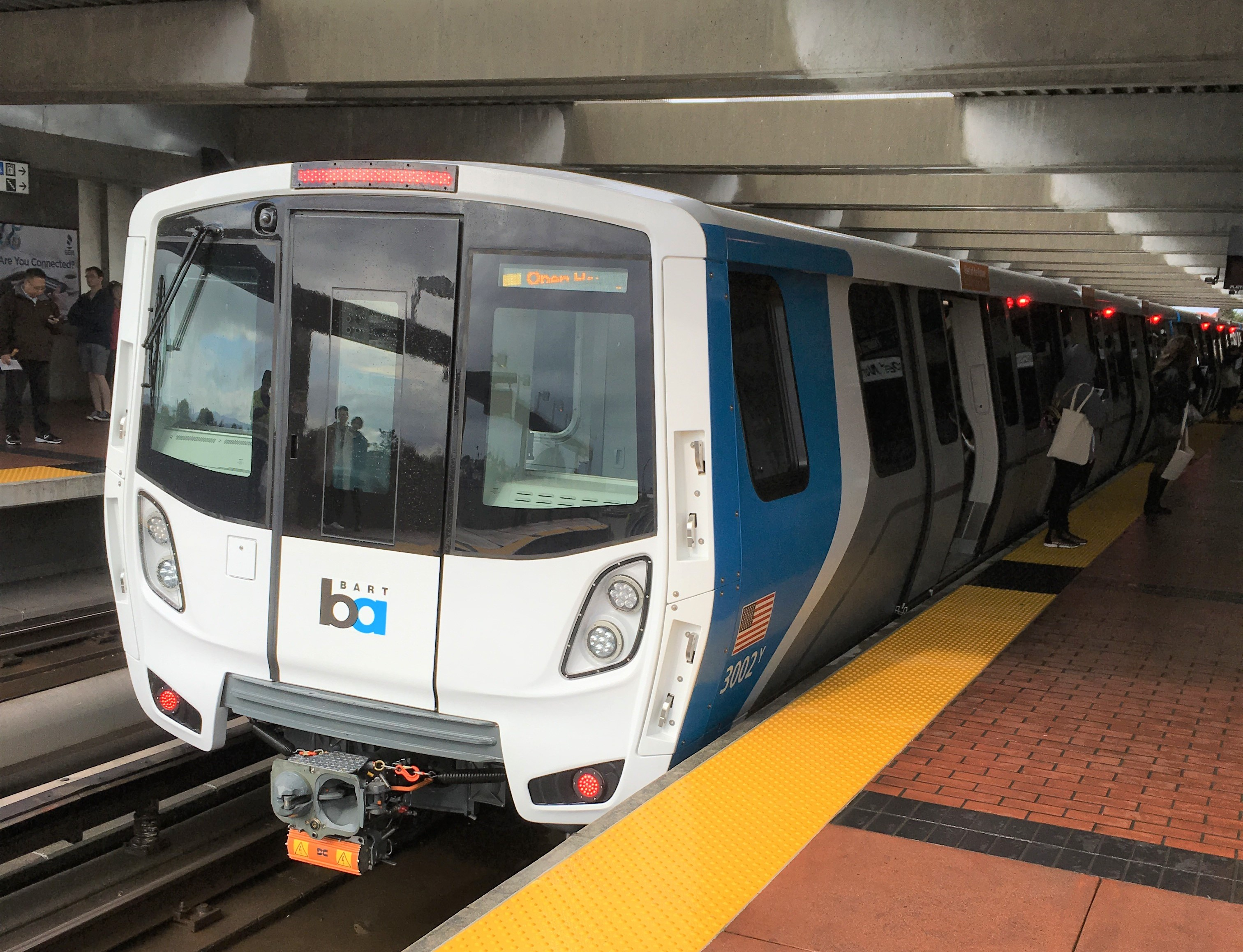

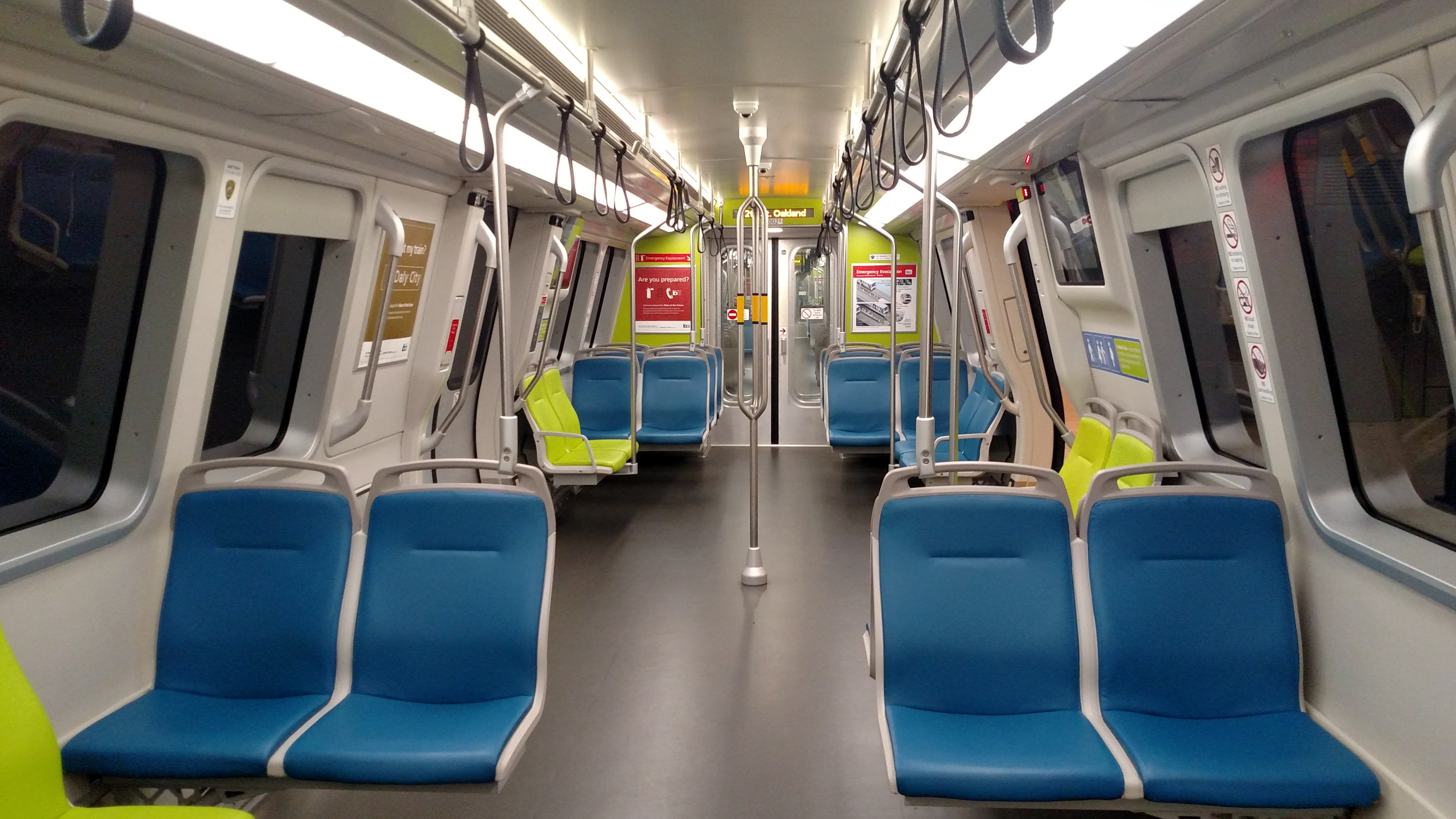
- In service: 2018–present
- Manufacturer: Bombardier/Alstom
- Designer: Morelli Designers
- Built at: Plattsburgh, New York; Pittsburg, California
- Family name: Movia
- Replaced: A, C series
- Constructed: 2012–2024
- Number built: 310
- Number in service: 310
- Fleet numbers: 3001–3310
- Capacity: 51 (seated)
- Depots: Colma Yard; Concord Yard; Hayward Complex; Richmond Yard

Specifications
- Car length: 70 ft (21 m)
- Platform height: 39 in (990 mm)
- Entry: Level
- Doors: 6
- Maximum speed: 80 mph (130 km/h)
- Electric systems: Third rail, 1 kV DC
- Current collection: contact shoe
- Minimum turning radius: 120 m (390 ft)
- Coupling system: Dellner
- Track gauge: 5 ft 6 in (1,676 mm)

E Car
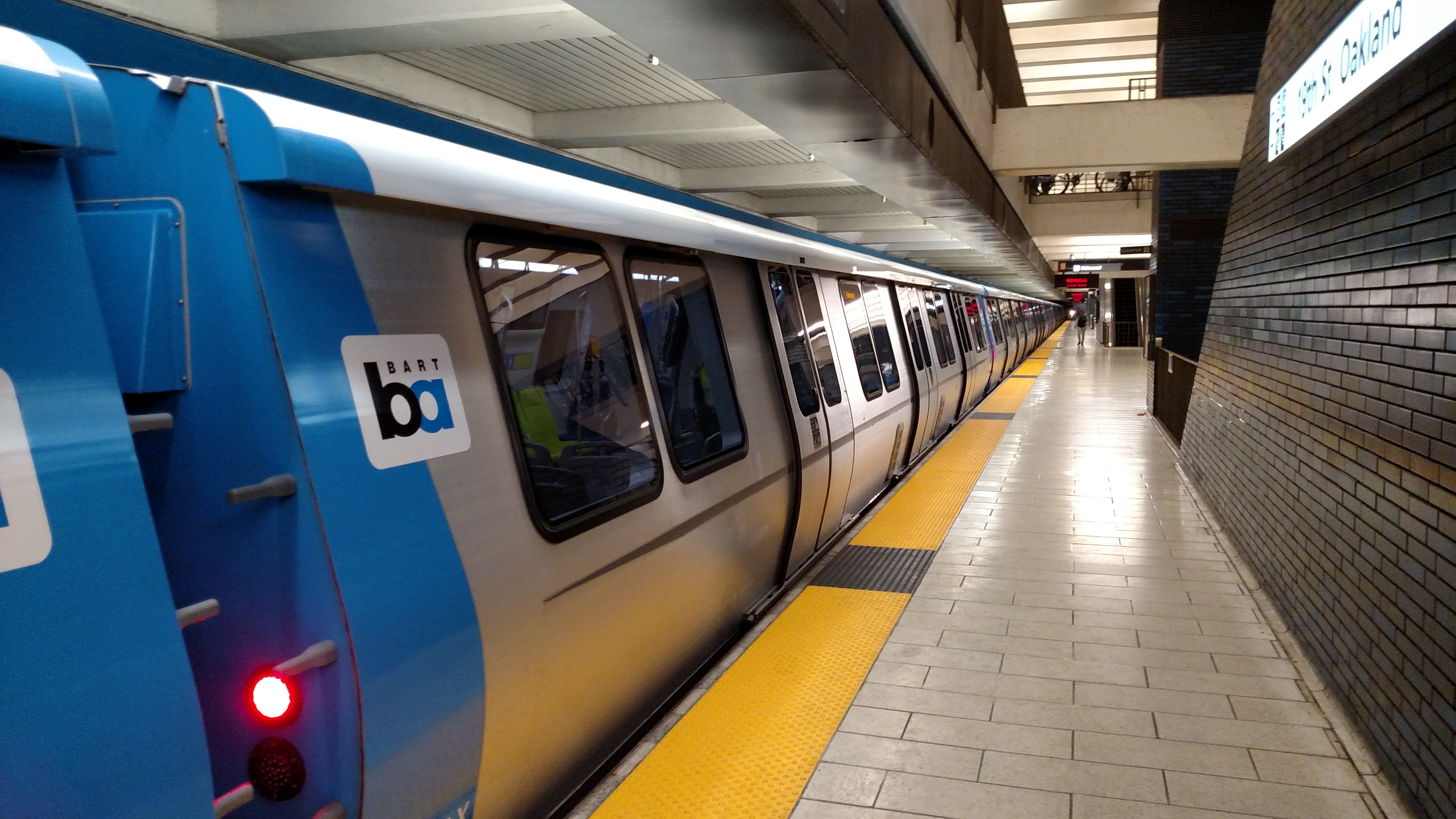
- Replaced: B, C series
- Constructed: 2012–present
- Number built: 760
- Number in service: 760
- Fleet numbers: 4001–4819
- Capacity: 56 (seated)

Notes/references
- Same specifications as D cars except where noted

In a 2010 APTA study, the average age of BART's mainline fleet was reported to be 30 years, longer than the usual lifespan of 25 years. Despite the purchase of newer cars over the years, the majority of the active fleet in 2016 was over 40 years old and had traveled over a million miles. Because of this, they have been increasingly prone to frequent breakdowns and repairs, decreasing the number of available cars and in turn increasing congestion, especially with the need to increase the fleet size for extensions to the network. Consequently, in 2009, BART began the process of expanding and replacing its railcar fleet. By 2010, it had received proposals from five suppliers, and on May 10, 2012, it awarded a $896.3 million contract to railcar manufacturer Bombardier (during delivery the company was bought by Alstom) with an order for 410 new cars, split into a base order of 260 cars and a first option order of 150 additional cars. The car was designed by Morelli Designers, an industrial design firm based in Montréal, Canada. On November 21, 2013, BART purchased 365 more cars, for a total fleet size of 775 new railcars, while also accelerating the delivery schedule by 21 months (from 10 cars per month up to 16 cars per month) and lowering procurement costs by approximately $135 million. The contract requires that at least 2/3 of its value be spent on U.S.-built parts.

The new fleet is composed of two different types of cars: 310 cab cars (D cars) and 465 non-cab cars (E cars). Both types have bike racks, new vinyl seats (54 per car), and passenger information systems that display next-stop information.

A major difference is an extra set of doorways on each side of the new cars to speed up boarding and alighting. They also include redesigned seating, bike racks, digital displays that display travel information, and automatic announcements. Due to potential access issues for people with disabilities, the pilot car layout was modified by the BART board in February 2015 to include two wheelchair spaces in the center of the car, as well as alternative layouts for bike and flexible open spaces.

The first test car was unveiled in April 2016; upon approval, the first 10 cars were expected to be in service in December 2016, and at least 20 by December 2017. This was delayed several times until the production cars were expected to be delivered in October 2017. Delivery of all 775 cars was initially expected to be completed by Fall 2022, with all cars in service by 2023. Bombardier initially agreed to speed production to have all cars available by the end of 2021 and in service by 2022.

In early November 2017, a test train failed a CPUC regulatory inspection due to door issues, leaving the planned late November revenue service in doubt. The first ten-car train received CPUC certification on January 17, 2018, and began revenue service two days later on January 19. Plans to have 198 new cars by July 2018 did not materialize, and the agency had put only 20 in service at that time. After only running on the Orange Line since January, a set of D and E cars began transbay service in October 2018.

In November 2018, BART announced they had negotiated to extend their purchase options to a total of 1,200 cars, though reports in 2019 stated that this deal was still not final. By the end of March 2019, 65 cars were in use; four 10-car trains for revenue service and the remainder for training. In June 2019, with 84 total cars delivered, Bombardier announced it would be moving production from their New York-based plant to a new facility shared with Hitachi Rail in Pittsburg, California in the East Bay.

In January 2021, BART stopped accepting new cars pending reliability improvements to be made by Bombardier. That same month, the struggling Bombardier sold its transportation division to Alstom, which said it would work to recover operations. BART was not alone with issues with Bombardier equipment. Before the Alstom deal, the company had seen declining profits largely caused by a series of major delays in delivering new fleets of trains (including the Flexity streetcars for Toronto and R179 subway cars for New York City) and reliability problems once trains were placed in service. BART resumed accepting new cars in February 2022.

BART has exclusively run Fleet of the Future trains on its base schedule since September 11, 2023. Legacy trains only ran when needed, such as on days with major events or during a service disruption. Since March 4, 2024 when BART had over 700 new cars and no longer needed to rely on the legacy trains, BART exclusively runs Fleet of the Future trains. BART retired the remaining legacy fleet on April 20, 2024, as the last run of revenue service.

The 775th new car was certified in July 2024, finally fulfilling the original Fleet of the Future contract. At that time, options were being exercised for two additional orders of rolling stock. The Transbay Corridor Core Capacity Program calls for an additional 306 cars to be added to allow capacity for 10-car trains to operate through the Transbay Tube at a rate of 30 per hour per direction. The Silicon Valley extension also requires the purchase of an additional 48 cars. These acquisitions will increase the size of the BART fleet to 1,129 main line vehicles.

As of July 20, 2026, BART has received 1,070 D and E cars, all of which have been certified for service. 658 cars are required for peak service, forming 55 trains.

== AGT fleet ==
Cable Liner
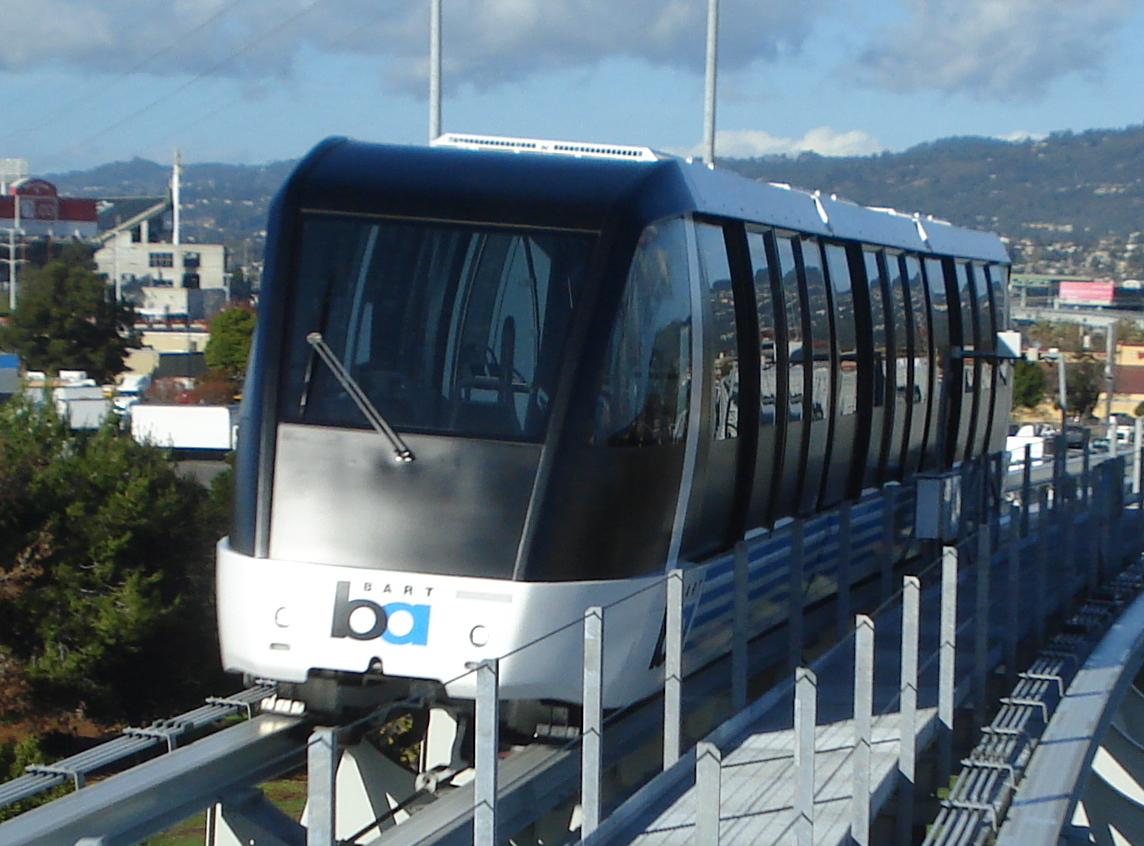

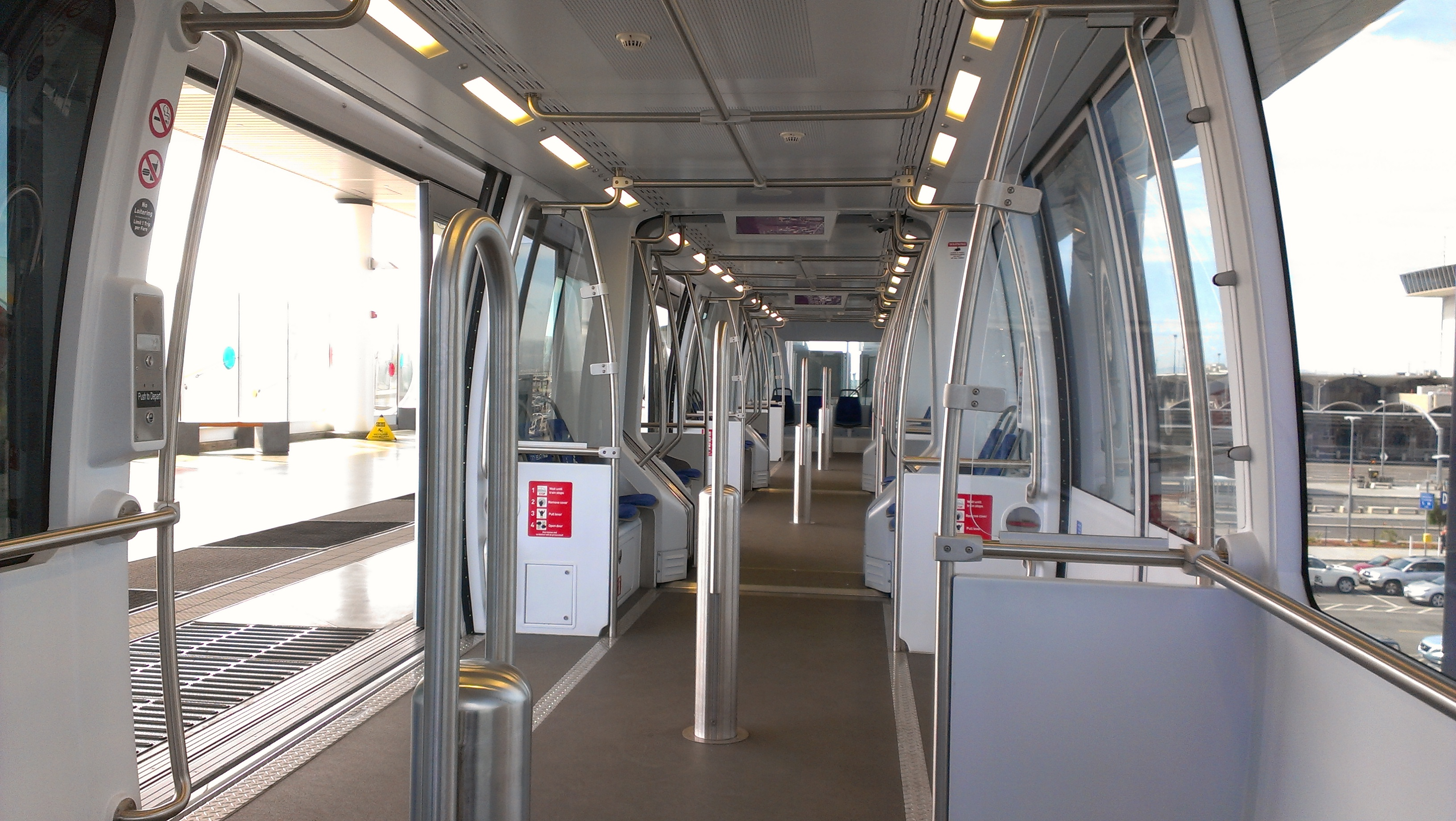
- Manufacturer: Doppelmayr Cable Car (DCC)
- Entered service: 2014
- Number built: 4
- Fleet numbers: 1.3–4.3
- Capacity: 113
- Depot: Doolittle maintenance and storage facility
- Line served: Oakland Airport Connector

Specifications
- Entry: level
- Articulated sections: 3
- Maximum speed: 30 mph (48 km/h)
- Engine type: stationary cable motors

The Oakland Airport Connector uses a completely separate and independently operated fleet as it uses off-the-shelf cable-car-based automated guideway transit technology. The fleet consists of four Cable Liner trains built by Doppelmayr Cable Car arranged as three-car sets, totaling twelve cars. The system is designed to be expanded to four-car trains with a capacity of 148 passengers in the future if necessary.

== eBART fleet ==
Stadler GTW
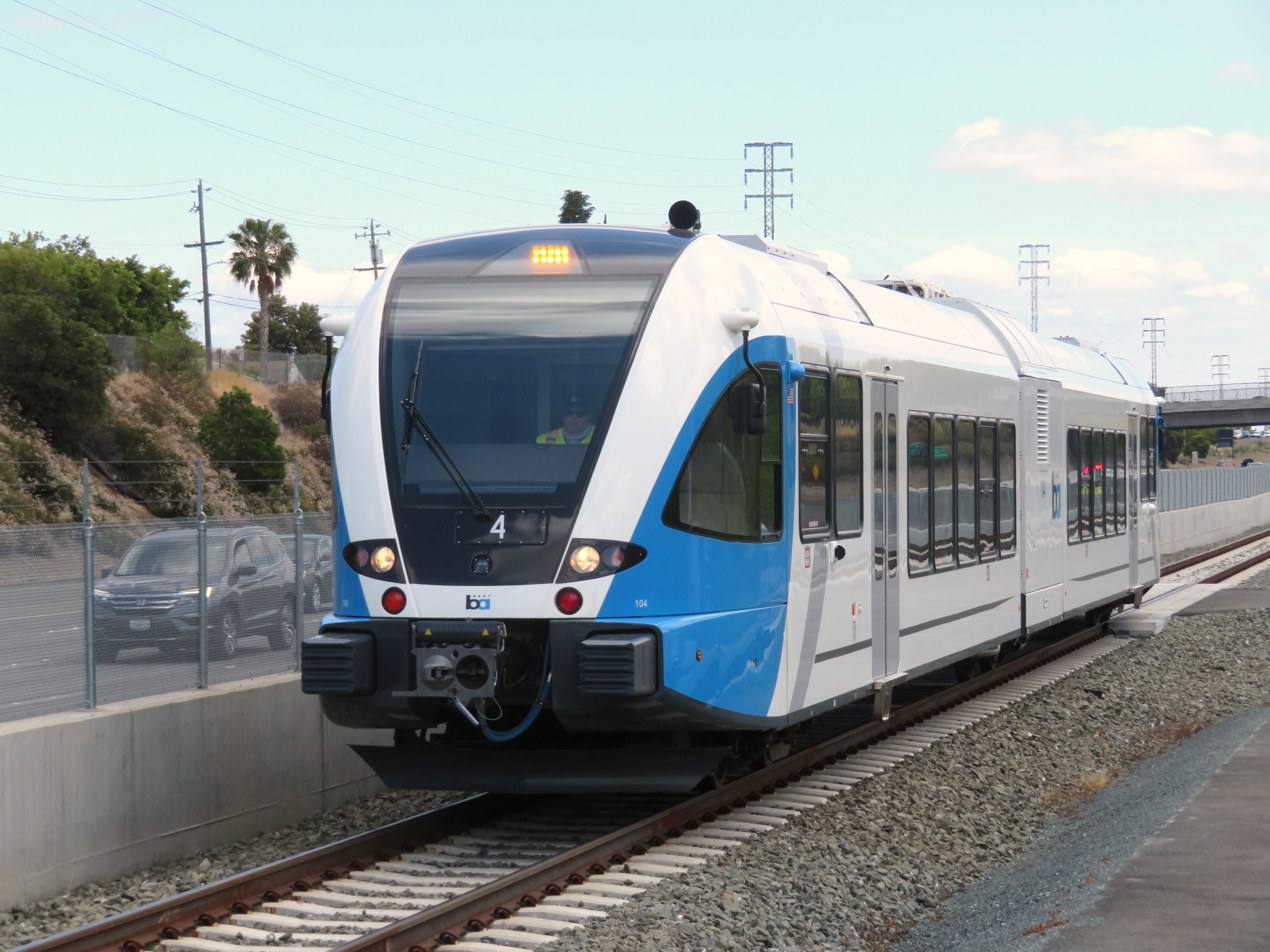
- Stadler GTW near Pittsburg Center station in May 2018

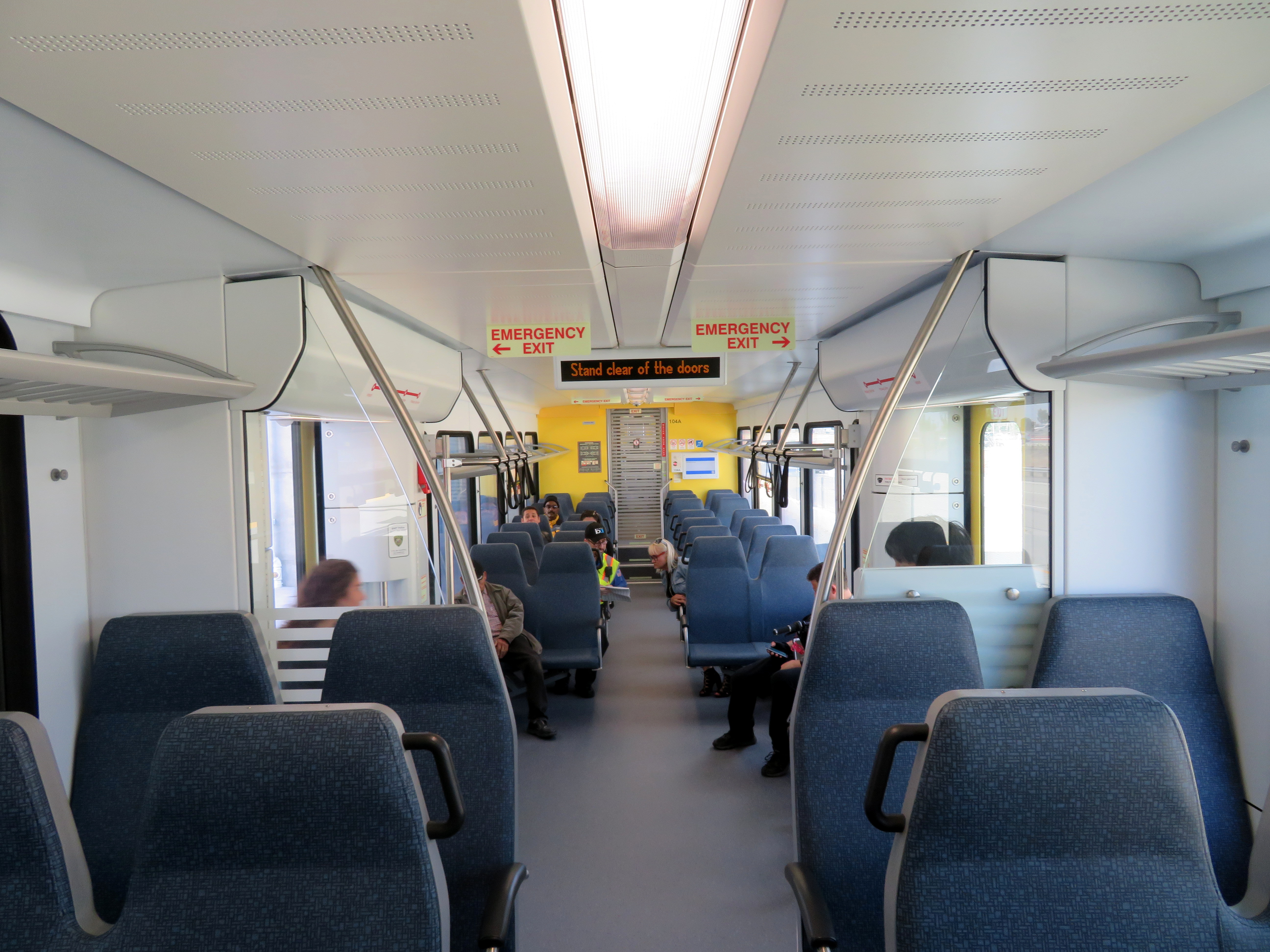
- Interior of the eBART DMU
- In service: 2018–present
- Manufacturer: Stadler Rail
- Built at: Bussnang, Switzerland
- Family name: GTW
- Constructed: 2014–2018
- Entered service: May 26, 2018
- Number built: 8
- Fleet numbers: 101–108
- Capacity: 104/96 (seated/standing)
- Depot: Antioch Yard
- Line served: eBART

Specifications
- Car body construction: Lightweight aluminum (end sections); Steel (middle section)
- Car length: 134 ft 2 in (40.89 m)
- Width: 9 ft 8 in (2.95 m)
- Floor height: High floor sections: 3 ft 4 in (1.02 m); Low floor sections: 24 in (620 mm)
- Entry: level
- Doors: 4
- Articulated sections: 2 (three sections)
- Wheel diameter: 34–31 in (870–800 mm) (driving, new–worn); 30 in (750 mm) (carrying, new)
- Wheelbase: 3 ft 4 in (1.02 m)
- Maximum speed: 75 mph (120 km/h)
- Weight: 71.9 t (70.8 long tons; 79.3 short tons)
- Axle load: 21 t (21 long tons; 23 short tons)
- Traction system: ABB BORDLINE CC750 DE IGBT power converter
- Prime mover: Traktionssysteme Austria TGE 59-28-4 500 hp (370 kW) asynchronous generator
- Engine type: Diesel
- Traction motors: 2 × TSA TMF 50-29-4 400 hp (300 kW) induction motor
- Power output: 800 hp (600 kW)
- Tractive effort: 80 kN (18,000 lb_{f})
- Transmission: TSA GMK 2-55-495B gearbox; 5.46 : 1 gear ratio
- UIC classification: 2′+Bo′+2′
- AAR wheel arrangement: 2-B-2
- Coupling system: Scharfenberg
- Track gauge: 4 ft 8 1/2 in (1,435 mm) standard gauge

Notes/references
- Sourced from except where noted

eBART is a spur line built to different design standards than the majority of the mainline; it is non-electrified 4 ft 8 1/2 in (1,435 mm) standard gauge and serviced by diesel-powered light rail. The vehicle procurement for the line included eight Stadler GTW articulated railcars, with two options to purchase six more. (Note: Stadler was the sole bidder for the contract.) The first was delivered in June 2016. The trains are diesel multiple units (DMUs) with 2/6 articulated power units, based on models previously used in Austin, Dallas and New Jersey.

== Maintenance ==
Builder	Model	In service	Note	Image
Plasser & Theurer	EM 110c	19??–present	Track geometry car	
MERMEC	Roger 600	2023	Track geometry car	
Plasser American			Ballast and switch tamper	
Nordco (Note: Actual builder unknown)			Ballast Regulator	
Shuttlewagon	SWX Series		Railcar mover	
Shuttlewagon			Road–rail vehicle	
Brandt	Maintenance Vehicle	c. 2011–present	Self Powered Flat Cars #5066, 5067, 5068.	
Relco Locomotives	Work Train	2019–2023	Three diesel locomotives and 14 flatcars with overall 800 ft (240 m) length for Transbay Tube refit project. Each locomotive has a limited weight of 132,000 pounds. All 17 cars sold and left Bay Area to Ozark Mountain Railcar in 2022.	
