= Doolittle (surname) =

Doolittle is a surname of English origin. Is is derived from a nickname for someone regarded as lazy or an idler, from the English words do and little. Notable people with the surname include:

- Amos Doolittle (1754–1832), American engraver and silversmith
- Benjamin Doolittle (1825–1895), New York politician
- Bev Doolittle (born 1947), American painter
- Bill Doolittle (1923–2014), American football player and coach Colt Doolittle
- Charles Doolittle (1832–1903), American Civil War general
- Dorothy Doolittle (born 1946), American marathon runner
- Ducky DooLittle (born 1970), American sex educator and performer
- Dudley Doolittle (1881–1957), American congressman from Kansas
- Eliakim Doolittle (1772–1850), American composer
- Eliza Doolittle (singer) (born 1988), British singer
- Emily Doolittle (born 1972), Canadian composer
- Ford Doolittle (born 1941), American biochemist
- Franklin M. Doolittle (1893–1979), American radio pioneer
- Henry C. Doolittle (1850–1926), American judge
- Hilda Doolittle (1886–1961), American poet and novelist known by her initials, H.D.
- Isaac Doolittle (1721–1800), American clockmaker
- James Rood Doolittle (1815–1897), American politician
- Jane Doolittle (1899–1990), American missionary
- Jimmy Doolittle (1896–1993), American aviation pioneer, general and recipient of the Medal of Honor
- Joel Doolittle (1773–1841), American politician
- John Doolittle (born 1950), American congressman from California
- Justus Doolittle (1824–1880), American Board of Commissioners for Foreign Missions missionary to Fuhchau, China
- Kristian Doolittle (born 1997), American basketball player for Hapoel Eilat of the Israeli Basketball Premier League
- Lucius Doolittle (1800–1862), American priest
- Lucy Salisbury Doolittle (1832-1908), American philanthropist
- Melinda Doolittle (born 1977), American singer
- Rilus Doolittle (1900–1983), American long-distance runner
- Robyn Doolittle (born 1984), Canadian reporter
- Russell Doolittle (born 1931), American biochemist
- Sean Doolittle (born 1986), American baseball player
- Sean Doolittle (author) (born 1971), American novelist
- Thomas Doolittle (c. 1632–1707), English nonconformist minister, tutor, and author
- Tilton E. Doolittle (1825–1896), politician and United States Attorney for the District of Connecticut
- William Doolittle

Fictional characters

- Eliza Doolittle, Cockney flower girl in the 1913 play Pygmalion and its 1956 musical adaptation My Fair Lady
- Doctor Dolittle, physician who speaks to animals in a series of children's books by Hugh Lofting, first appearing in 1920
