= Doctor Dolittle (disambiguation) =

Doctor Dolittle is the central character of a series of children's books by Hugh Lofting.

Doctor Dolittle may also refer to:

== Film ==
- Dr. Dolittle (franchise), an American fantasy film franchise
  - Doctor Dolittle (1967 film), an American musical fantasy film
  - Dr. Dolittle (1998 film), an American fantasy comedy film
  - Dr. Dolittle 2, a 2001 American fantasy comedy film
  - Dr. Dolittle 3, a 2006 American direct-to-video fantasy comedy film
  - Dr. Dolittle: Tail to the Chief, a 2008 American direct-to-video fantasy comedy film
  - Dr. Dolittle: Million Dollar Mutts, a 2009 American direct-to-video fantasy comedy film
  - Dolittle (film), a 2020 American fantasy adventure film

== Other uses ==
- Doctor Dolittle (TV series), an American animated television series
- Doctor Dolittle (musical), a 1998 musical by Leslie Bricusse
  - Doctor Dolittle (cast recording), a cast album of the musical

== See also ==
- Dolittle (disambiguation)
- Doolittle (disambiguation)
