= Osaka Electro-Communication University Junior College =

- 大阪電気通信大学短期大学部
- Type: Private
- Active: 1958–2008
- Faculty: Electronics
- Location: Neyagawa Osaka Prefecture, Japan
- Mascot: athletics =

Osaka Electro-Communication University Junior College (大阪電気通信大学短期大学部, Osaka Denki Tsushin Daigaku Tanki Daigakubu) was a junior college in Neyagawa Osaka Prefecture, Japan, and was part of the Osaka Electro-Communication University network.

The Junior College was founded in 1958. The predecessor of the school, Tōa Denki Tsushin kōgakkō, was founded in 1941. The course of this Junior College was Electronics（Daytime and Evening. The school was disestablished in 2008.
