= Dolittle (programming language) =

Programming language

Dolittle (ドリトル)
- Paradigm: multi-paradigm: Object-oriented
- Designed by: KANEMUNE Susumu (兼宗進)
- Developer: Osaka Electro-Communication University
- Stable release: 2.3 / September 2011

Influenced by
- LOGO

Dolittle (Japanese ドリトル doritoru) is a programming language developed at the Osaka Electro-Communication University. Unlike the majority of programming languages it uses keywords based on Japanese and is written in Japanese script. It is named after the character Dr. Dolittle. It is easier for learners whose native language is Japanese to make early progress in understanding programming.

== Features ==
The language uses Japanese keywords, although Korean and English-based versions of the language also exist. The syntax is based on Japanese word order (Subject Object Verb), which is unnatural in English. The language is prototype-based and object-oriented.

The language has native facilities for Turtle graphics, including easy-to-use collision detection, and musical output using the Sakura library and notation to generate Midi. The language has been ported to Arduino for robotic systems.

The language is implemented in Java, and so runs on a range of systems. It is distributed for free, and in an online version.

== Example program ==
This example creates two turtles and two buttons for controlling them.

かめ太＝タートル！作る。
カメ＝タートル！　作る。
時計＝タイマー！　作る　0.1秒　間隔　500回　回数。 時計！　「かめ太！　１０　歩く」　実行。
左＝ボタン！”左”作る。 左：動作＝「かめ太！　２０　左回り」。
右＝ボタン！”右”作る。 右：動作＝「かめ太！　１０　右回り」。
