= Dolittle =

Dolittle may refer to:

- Dolittle (film), a 2020 film
- Dolittle (programming language), a Japanese programming language

== See also ==
- Doctor Dolittle, a fictional character
- Doolittle (disambiguation)
