= Doolittles =

Former Irish sandwich making company

Doolittles was an Irish sandwich making company, headquartered in Laghey, County Donegal. Originally operating as a coffee shop selling its own products, the company later manufactured prepacked sandwiches for sale in retail outlets. Founded in 2001, at its peak it was the "third-largest pre-packed sandwich producer in Ireland [..] employing 32 people". It closed in 2009.

== History ==
In 2001, Jenni Timony opened Doolittles in the "New Row" area of Donegal. The company began to manufacture sandwiches for retail outlets and expanded throughout Ireland. In 2006 the company won the Ulster Bank Invoice Finance/ Irish Independent Business Achievers Award.

Aer Arann served Doolittles sandwiches as part of its buy on board programme.

The company was liquidated in 2009, with many unpaid creditors.
