= Doolittle Maintenance and Storage Facility =

Cable car maintenance facility and proposed station in Oakland, California

Doolittle
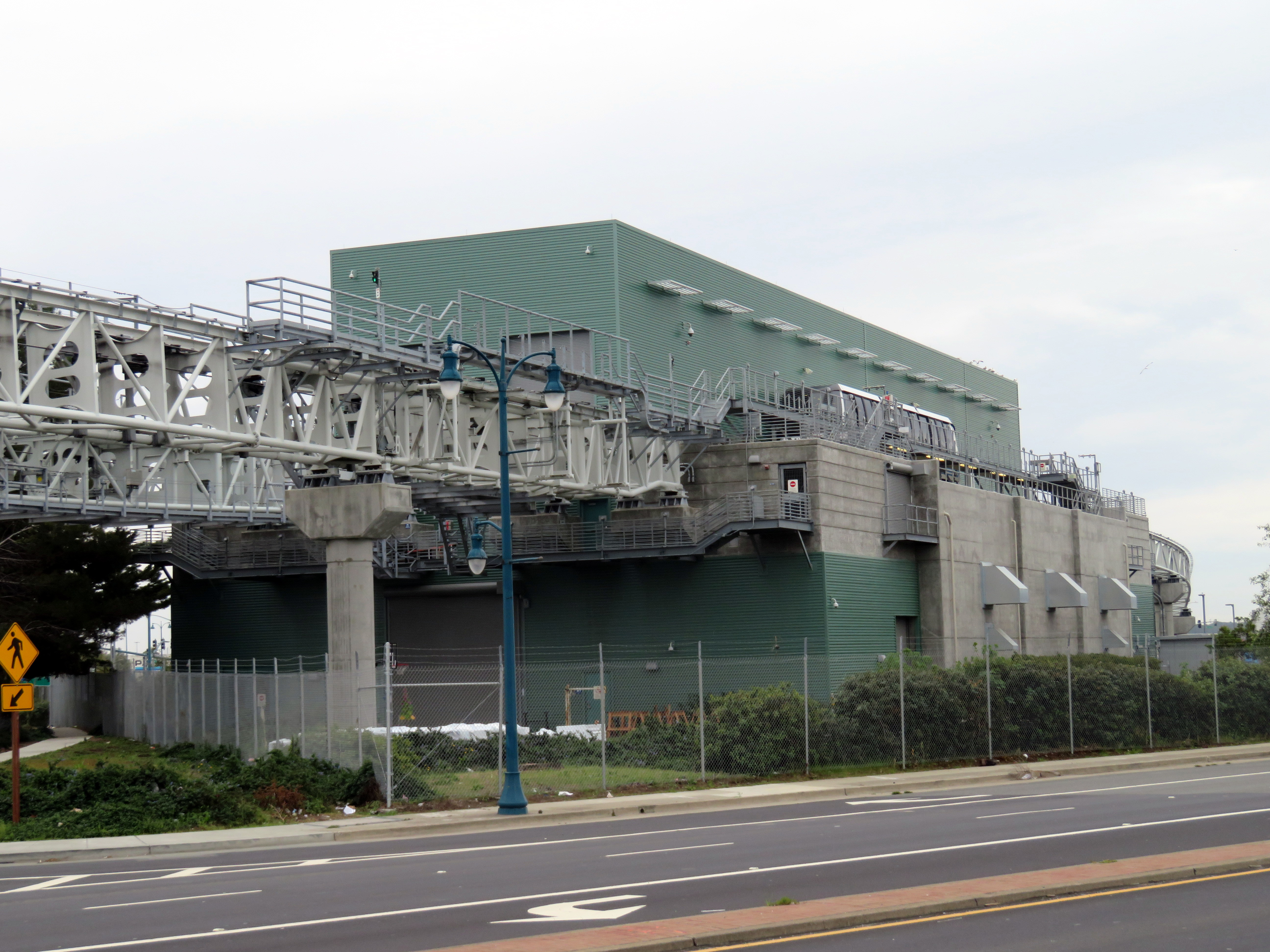
- Doolittle Maintenance and Storage Facility in 2018

General information
- Location: Hegenberger Drive at Doolittle Drive; Oakland, California
- Coordinates: 37°43′42″N 122°11′59″W
- Platforms: 2 side platforms (proposed)

Other information
- Status: Maintenance and storage center Infill station proposed

Proposed services
Preceding station	Bay Area Rapid Transit	Following station
Oakland International Airport Terminus	Oakland Airport Connector Proposed station	Coliseum Terminus
Location

The Doolittle Maintenance and Storage Facility (also known as the Wheelhouse) is the operations management center for the BART Oakland Airport Connector. The building is used for storage and maintenance of the Cable Liner cars, and is also the powerhouse for the system's 12-foot (3.7 m) drive wheels.

In the initial plans for the Oakland Airport Connector, the Doolittle Drive facility was planned to also serve as a passenger station. The station was not built, but the facility's design allows for it to be built in the future. Vehicles stop at the structure in both directions to switch cable loops, but do not allow passengers to disembark.

== History ==
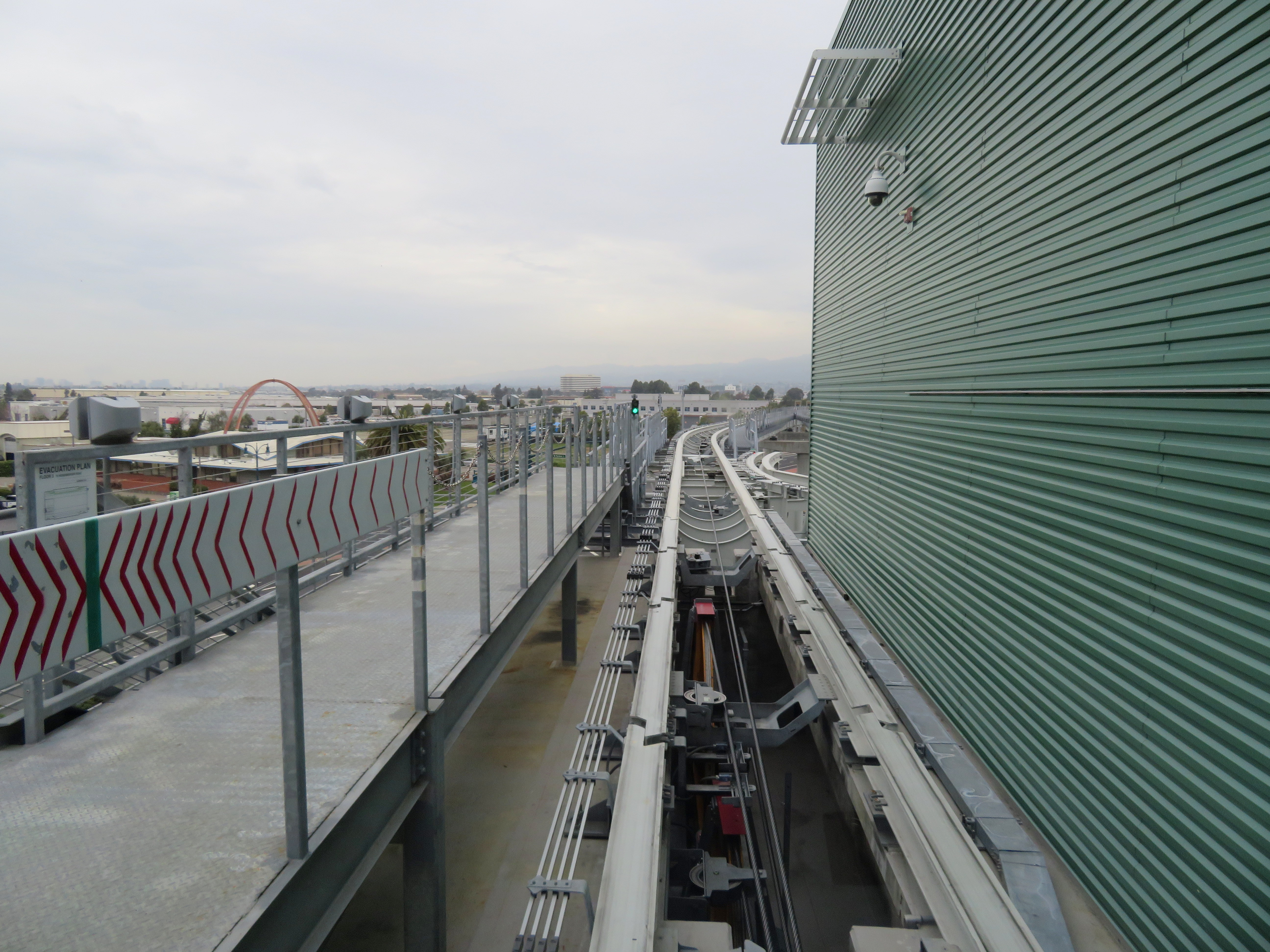
Trackway at the MSF, with planned platform site at left

The Final Environmental Impact Report for the Oakland Airport Connector automated guideway transit (people mover) system, released in 2002, called for two intermediate stations on the line at Doolittle Drive and Edgewater Drive. Those stations were intended to support the City of Oakland's plans to improve development along Hegenberger Road – an area largely occupied by airport hotels and industrial businesses. A November 2006 addendum removed the proposed Edgewater Drive station after transit-oriented development plans fell through, and relocated the Maintenance and Storage Facility (MSF) on a short spur adjacent to the Doolittle Drive station to reduce costs.

By the time construction began in 2013, several additional design changes were made: the MSF was reduced in size and relocated to between the tracks, and the station at Doolittle Drive was deferred until funding was available. A former union house was demolished to provide space for the MSF. The Oakland Airport Connector opened on November 22, 2014, with only the two terminal stations. If funding is secured, an infill station can be added at Doolittle Drive by constructing platforms, a below-track mezzanine, and stairs and elevators for access.
