= William Doolittle =

William Doolittle may refer to:

- William H. Doolittle (1848–1914), U.S. Representative from Washington
- William E. Doolittle (born 1947), American geographer
