= Doolittle Massif =

Mountain in Antarctica

Doolittle Massif (80°50′S 156°42′E) is a compact group of mountain heights in the northwest Churchill Mountains between Zeller Glacier and Sefton Glacier where the glaciers enter the larger Byrd Glacier. The feature is 10 nautical miles (18 km) long and rises to 2,050 metres (6,730 ft) in Mount Rainbow. It was named by the Advisory Committee on Antarctic Names after General James H. (Jimmy) Doolittle United States Air Force, an American aviator and hero who visited McMurdo Station in 1962. In 1942 then Lieutenant Colonel Doolittle initiated heavy aircraft operations from the U.S. Navy aircraft carrier Hornet leading to carrier-based R4D operations from the carrier Philippine Sea during Operation Highjump in January 1946.
