= Bev Doolittle =

American painter (born 1947)

- Born: Bev Doolittle; February 10, 1947 (age 79); California, United States
- Known for: Painting

Bev Doolittle (born February 10, 1947) is an American artist working mainly in watercolor paints. She creates paintings of the American West that feature themes of Native American life, wild animals, horses, and landscapes.

== Biography ==
Doolittle attended college at the Art Center College of Design in Los Angeles, where she met her husband, Jay Doolittle. The Doolittles, after a brief career as graphic artists, became "traveling artists" and drove in a motorhome around the American southwest, painting scenes of the landscape as they went. It was during this period that Bev's paintings of the American Western landscape and its wildlife began to develop and soon after, she began to portray Native Americans—often including them alongside animal themes.

Doolittle's paintings and prints are collected by those interested in Western themes. Realistic Western art has conventionally been dominated by oil painting, and Doolittle was instrumental in bringing watercolors into the genre.

Doolittle has co-authored and illustrated several books. She has long been interested in the plight of Native Americans, wild animals, and ecological and environmental issues and her books and paintings focus on these issues.

She refers to her style as "camouflage technique" in which certain details of her art can be seen in more than one way. For example, in The Forest Has Eyes, the rocks and waterfalls seen close up appear as the faces of Native Americans when viewed from a distance. In Mesa Ruins, close-up viewing appears to show the Mesa Verde Canyon Anasazi dwellings, although from a distance it gives an impression of the eye and nose of a Native American male. In Shoshone Crossing, the snow-filled meadow in which horseback riders are crossing appears from farther away to be the shape of a running horse. Her twenty-four set collection of paintings of dark-brown horses set against light brown rocks and white snow, from a distance and arranged in order spell out the words Hide and Seek.

== Books ==
- Doolittle, Bev; Maclay, Elise (2001). The Art of Bev Doolittle (2nd ed.). Trumbull, CT: Greenwich Workshop Press. ISBN 9780867130089. OCLC 21077294. First edition (1990) at the Internet Archive.
