= Doolittle Bluff =

Doolittle Bluff (77°37′S 162°38′E) is the large rock bluff at the head of Suess Glacier, on the north side of Taylor Valley, Victoria Land. From the Suess Glacier névé, the bluff rises 500 metres (1,600 ft) to a summit area at 1,835 metres (6,020 ft). It was named by the Advisory Committee on Antarctic Names (1997) after John H. (Jack) Doolittle, an American physicist who was: Station Science Leader at Siple Station, winter party 1977; Research Scientist at the Lockheed Martin Palo Alto Research Laboratory, Space Physics Laboratory, from 1983; and Staff Physicist there from 1993; a continuous participant as a South Pole co-investigator in auroral studies since 1983; and made 20 working visits to Antarctica (McMurdo, Siple and South Pole Stations) from the 1975–76 season.
