= Oakland Airport Connector =

Automated guideway transit system in Oakland, California

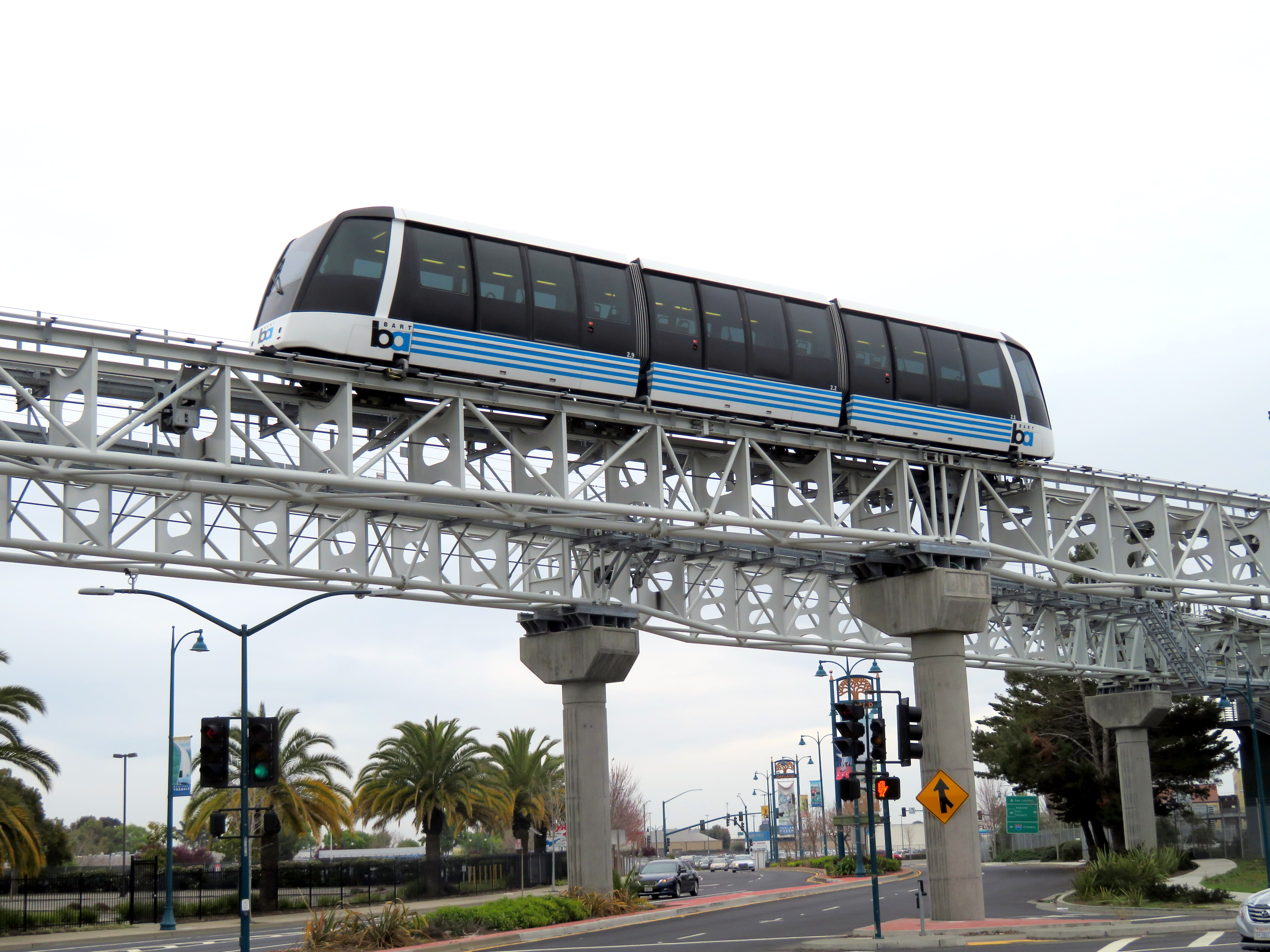
- Train crossing Airport Access Road in March 2018

Overview
- Owner: Bay Area Rapid Transit District
- Locale: Oakland, California, United States
- Stations: 2
- Website: bart.gov/guide/airport/oak

Service
- Type: Automated guideway transit (AGT)
- System: Bay Area Rapid Transit
- Rolling stock: 4 three-car trains
- Daily ridership: 900 (weekdays, Q1 2026)
- Ridership: 374,200 (2025)

History
- Opened: November 22, 2014

Technical
- Track length: 3.2 mi (5.1 km)
- Character: Mostly elevated, with at-grade and underground sections
- Operating speed: 30 mph (48 km/h) (top); 24 mph (39 km/h) (avg.)
Route map
Oakland Airport Connector highlighted in grey

The Oakland Airport Connector is an automated guideway transit (AGT) system operated by Bay Area Rapid Transit (BART) between BART's Coliseum station and Oakland International Airport station. The line is colored on BART maps as grey. The system is integrated into BART's fare system. The line opened for revenue service on November 22, 2014, replacing the AirBART shuttle bus service that had operated since July 1, 1977. Currently operating between two terminal stations, the system includes provisions for an intermediate third station (Doolittle station) that may be built at a later date.

In 2025, the line had a ridership of 374,200, or about 900 per weekday as of the first quarter of 2026.

== Operations ==
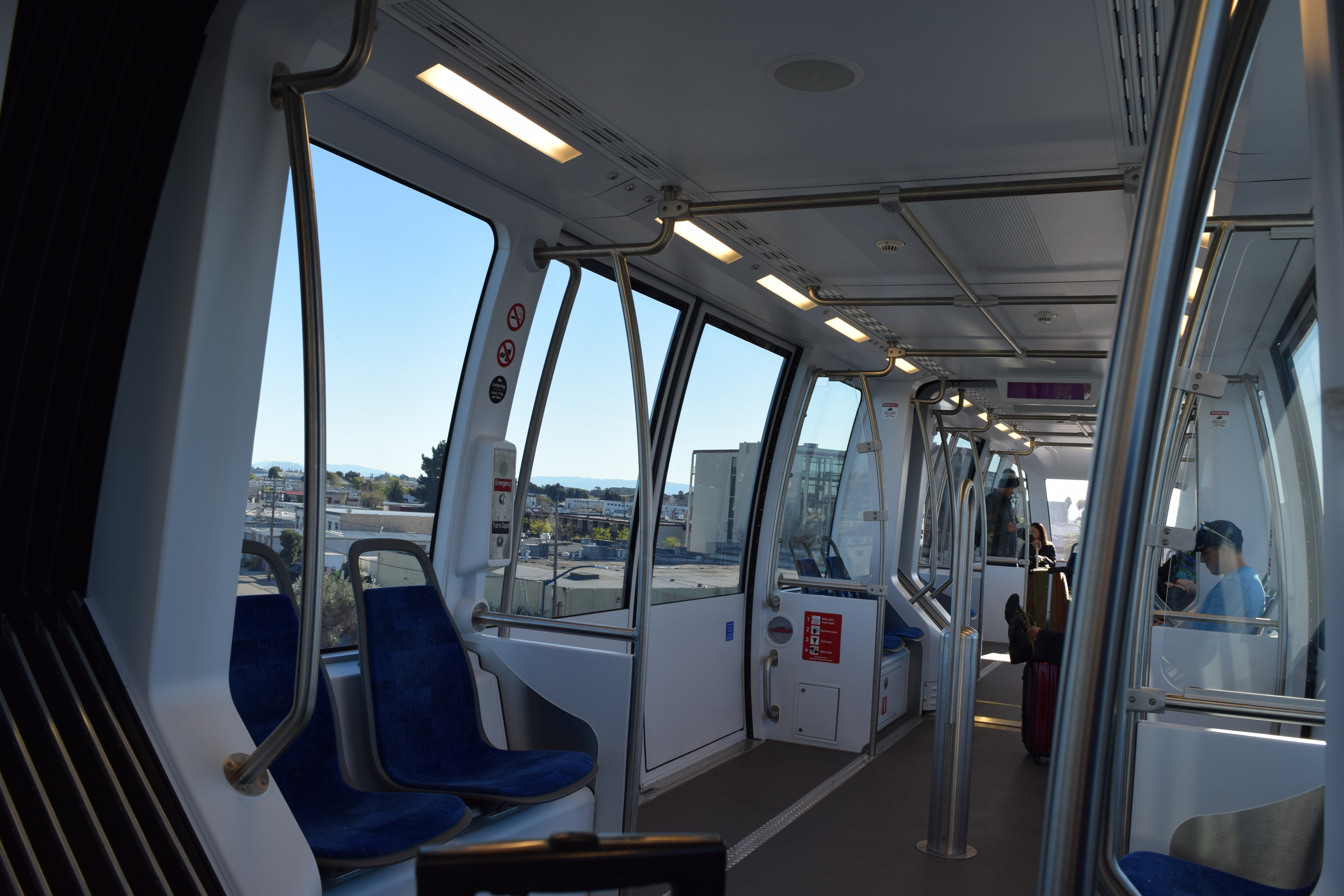
Interior of the vehicle

The Oakland Airport Connector AGT system is operated by BART and is integrated into BART's existing fare system. However, it does not utilize existing BART rolling stock and it is not physically connected with existing BART tracks. Instead it has its own fleet of AGT vehicles that operate on fixed guideways and are cable-drawn. The guideways and Cable Liner vehicles were built by Doppelmayr Cable Car. The line is designed to have an approximate headway of 4.5 minutes (though it is currently operated with a headway of 6 minutes) and to complete a one-way trip in approximately 8 minutes, with an on-time performance of more than 99.5%. The initial setup is four 3-car trains (113 passengers each train), but the system can accommodate an expansion to four 4-car trains (148 passengers each train).

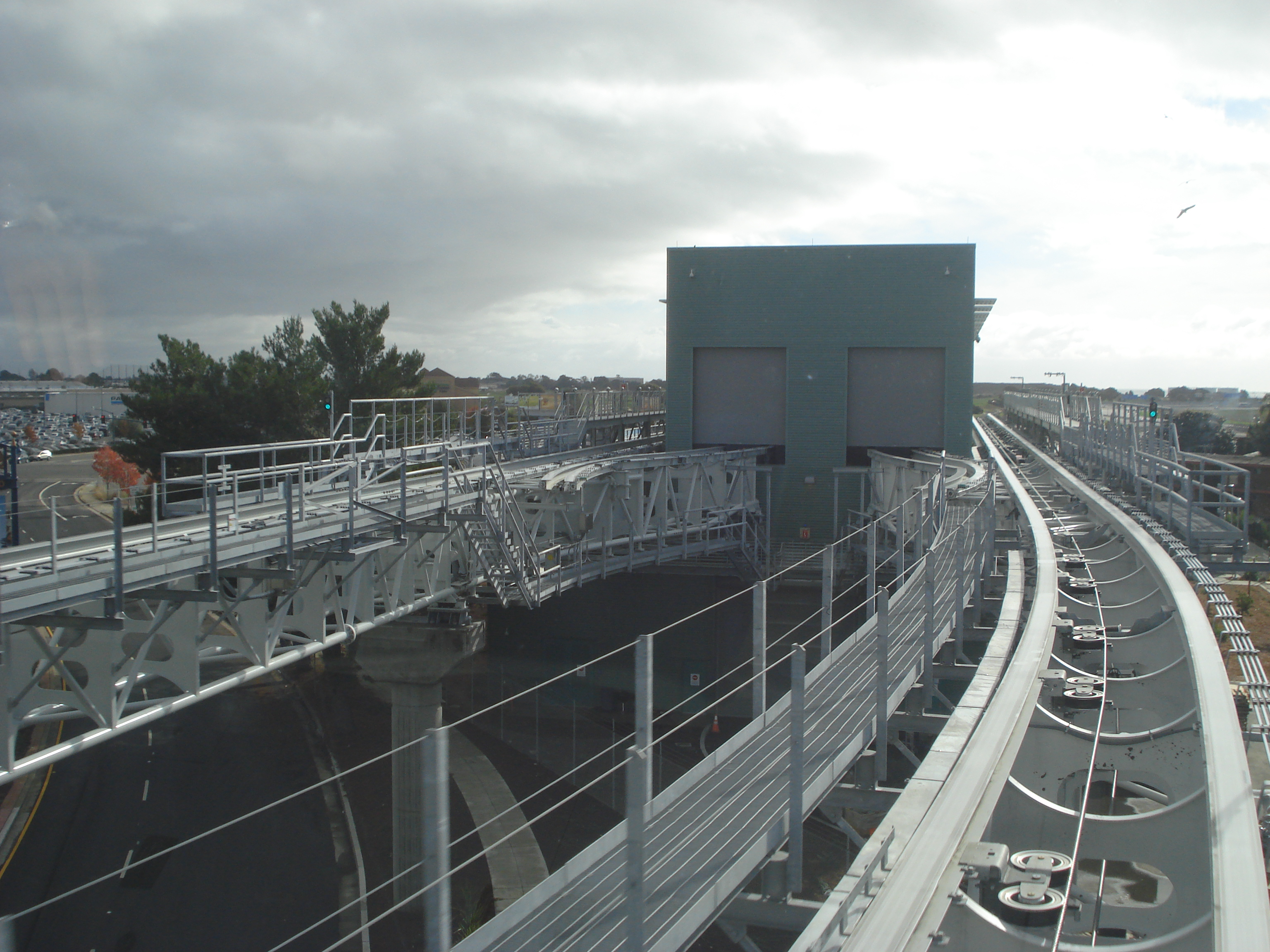
Doolittle Maintenance and Storage Facility

The system has four cable loops and one train per cable. The system uses a pinched-loop configuration, with two lines that merge into a single track just before each terminus. Cars switch cables during dwell time at the station. The trains automatically switch cables four times: once at each end, and halfway between the two stops at the wheelhouse, near the intersection of Hegenberger Road and Airport Access Road. The wheelhouse has four 12-foot (3.7 m) drive wheels that move the cables.

The 3.2-mile (5.1 km) AGT route between Oakland Coliseum Station and the airport is mostly elevated, largely in the median of Hegenberger Road, with one underground section as it passes under Doolittle Drive, and one at-grade section just west of that point, before the AGT enters airport property on an elevated guideway. A maintenance and storage facility is located near the midpoint of the system. A two-person team monitors the operation of the system from a central control room in the Doolittle Maintenance and Storage Facility.

The Airport station's fare gates are located at Coliseum station, between the line's dedicated platform and the elevated walkway above San Leandro Street linking it to the original platform. Both stations for the line feature platform screen doors – a first for the system.

The line is paralleled by AC Transit Route 73, which is less frequent during peak hours but less expensive. Routes 73 and 805 provide overnight service during hours that the Oakland Airport Connector – and the rest of the BART system – are closed.

=== Fares ===
On June 12, 2014, BART's board of directors voted to set the base fare for travel on the BART to Oakland International Airport AGT system at US$6. The board left open the possibility that temporary promotional fares could be introduced in the future. In addition, seniors, people with disabilities, and children age 12 and under will be eligible for BART's 62.5% discount. As of November 2016, the line operated with a farebox recovery ratio of 96%. This lower-than-expected revenue, in part due to competition from ridesharing companies, resulted in a net operating cost of US$860,000 between 2014 and 2016.

== History ==
=== AirBART ===
AirBART
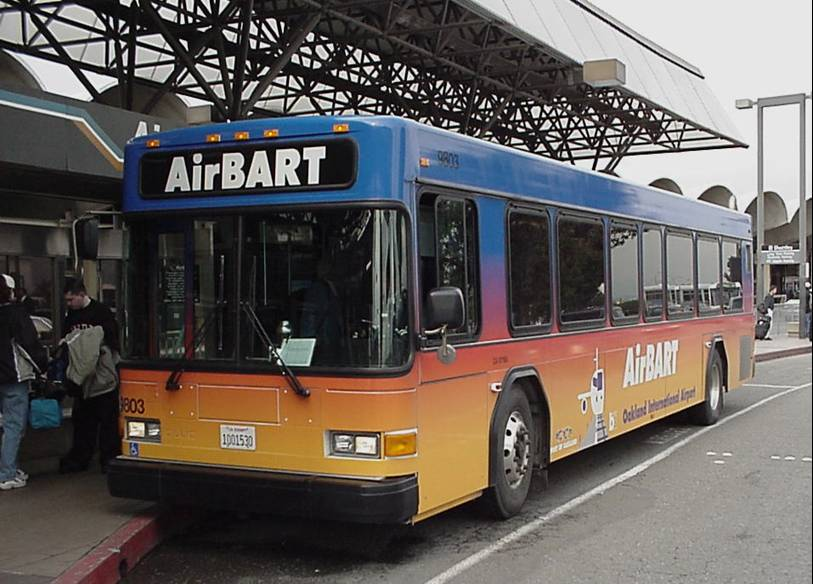
- AirBART bus at the airport around 2008

Overview
- System: Bay Area Rapid Transit
- Status: Defunct
- Began service: 1977
- Ended service: 2014

Route
- Start: Coliseum station
- End: Oakland San Francisco Bay Airport

Service
- Level: Daily
- Frequency: Every 10 minutes
- Operates: 5:00 am – 12:00 am; 8:00 am – 12:00 am (Sundays)

On July 1, 1977, BART began a shuttle bus service called AirBART that ran to the airport terminals from street level at Coliseum station (thereafter named Coliseum/Oakland Airport). The shuttle ride took ten minutes and cost 50 cents. AirBART was a joint project of BART and the Port of Oakland, which owns and operates the airport.

As with other BART-branded connecting buses, AirBART was run by private operators under contract. It was operated by Veolia Transport (Shuttleport) from 2001 to 2012, then by Ampco until 2014. The diesel bus fleet was replaced by compressed natural gas buses around 2008.

At the time of replacement, AirBART ran from 5:00am (8:00am on Sundays) to midnight – approximately matching BART operating hours – with nominal headways of ten minutes at most times. Travel time was estimated as 15 minutes. However, travel times and frequency were inconsistent due to traffic congestion from commuters and Oakland–Alameda County Coliseum events. Passengers were required to pay the $3 fare with exact change or a $3 BART ticket from dedicated fare machines. Because of a dispute between BART and the Port of Oakland about who would pay to modify fare equipment, Clipper Card readers were never installed on the buses.

Ridership was about 2,800 per day in 2008, but dropped to 1,900 daily riders by 2014. AirBART service was discontinued on November 22, 2014, when the Oakland Airport Connector opened, though buses were kept on standby for one week in case the new line experienced failures. The buses were then transferred to airport parking shuttle buses to replace diesel buses.

=== Funding ===
The US$484 million for funding the project came from local government funds (US$275 million, or 57%), state funds (US$79 million, 16%), federal funds (US$25 million, 5%), and BART deficit spending (US$106 million, 22%).

In late 2009, just prior to the award of the contract to construct the system, the project lost US$70 million of funding because the US Federal Transit Administration (FTA) found that BART was out of conformance with Title VI of the 1964 Civil Rights Act. The FTA cited that BART did not complete the necessary analysis to determine if the future change in service would disproportionately impact low-income or minority communities. The FTA forced the Metropolitan Transportation Commission to reallocate the funding.

By September 2010, all necessary federal and state funding for the Oakland Airport Connector had been re-established, and a groundbreaking ceremony was held on October 20, 2010, featuring key administrators: BART Director Carole Ward Allen, Congresswoman Barbara Lee, State Assemblyman Sandré Swanson, Oakland Mayor Ron Dellums and Oakland City Councilman Larry Reid.
