= Oakland International Airport station =

Transit station at Oakland International Airport

Oakland International Airport
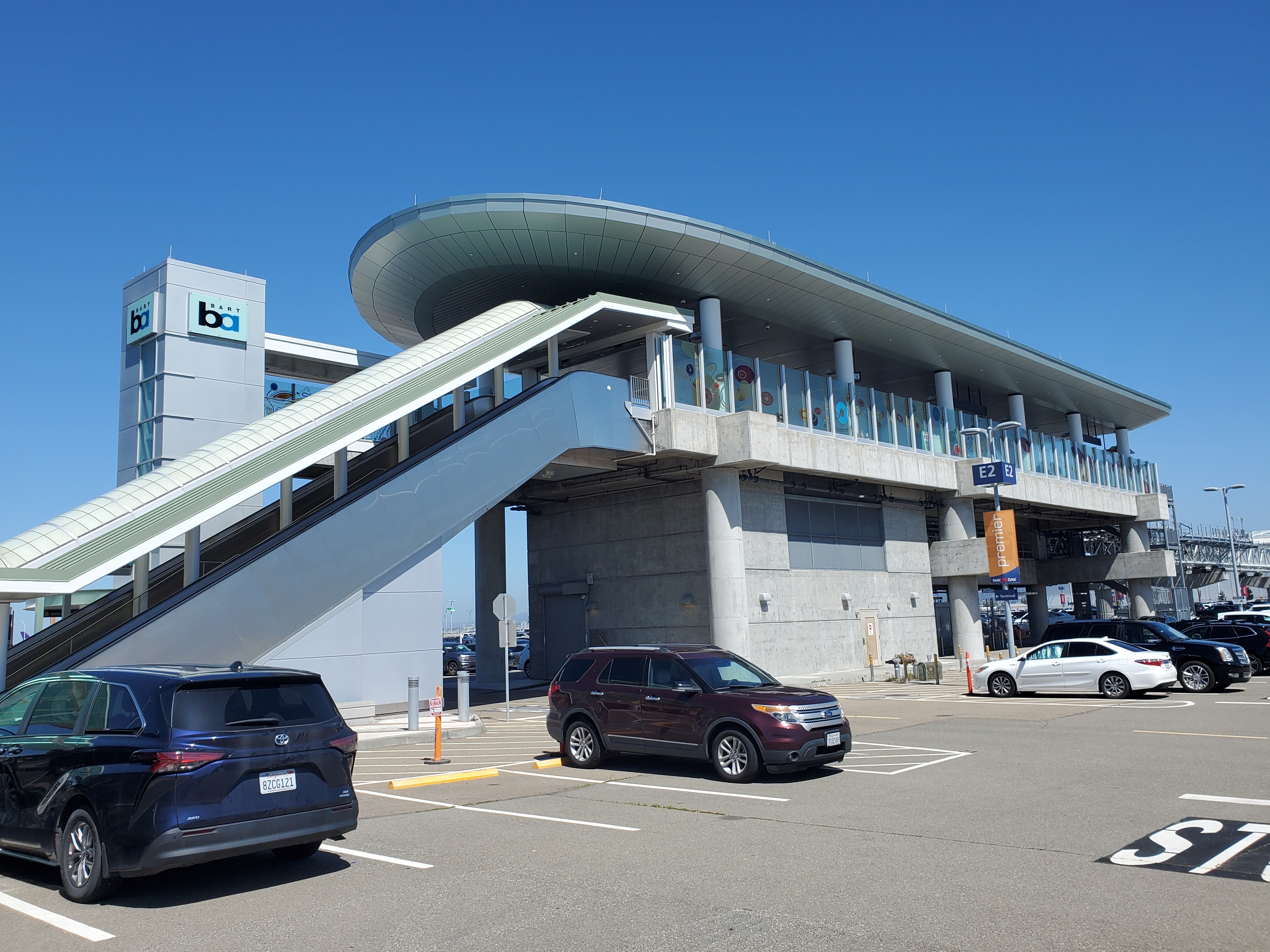
- Oakland International Airport station in April 2024

General information
- Location: 4 Airport Drive; Oakland, California
- Coordinates: 37.7132°N 122.2122°W
- Owner: Bay Area Rapid Transit District
- Platforms: 1 side platform
- Tracks: 1
- Connections: AC Transit: 73, 805; Sonoma County Airport Express

Construction
- Structure type: Elevated
- Parking: Paid parking nearby
- Accessible: Yes

Other information
- Station code: BART: OAKL

History
- Opened: November 22, 2014

Passengers
- 2025: 523 (weekday average)

Services
| Preceding station | Bay Area Rapid Transit | Following station |
|---|---|---|
| Terminus | Oakland Airport Connector | Coliseum Terminus |
Location

Oakland International Airport station is a Bay Area Rapid Transit (BART) station on the Oakland Airport Connector in Oakland, California, serving Oakland San Francisco Bay Airport (OAK). This station is on the system's automated guideway transit (AGT) spur line, which carries passengers between the airport and Coliseum station. It is among the least-used stations on the BART system, with 523 daily boardings in November 2025.

The station opened on November 22, 2014. Unlike the former AirBART shuttle bus system it replaced, the Oakland Airport Connector system is fully integrated into the BART fare system, including the acceptance of Clipper cards. All ticketing machines and faregates for the line are at Coliseum station; no fare equipment is located at Oakland International Airport.
