= Osaka Electro-Communication University =

University in Osaka Prefecture, Japan

Coordinates: 34°45′37″N 135°37′37″E

- 大阪電気通信大学
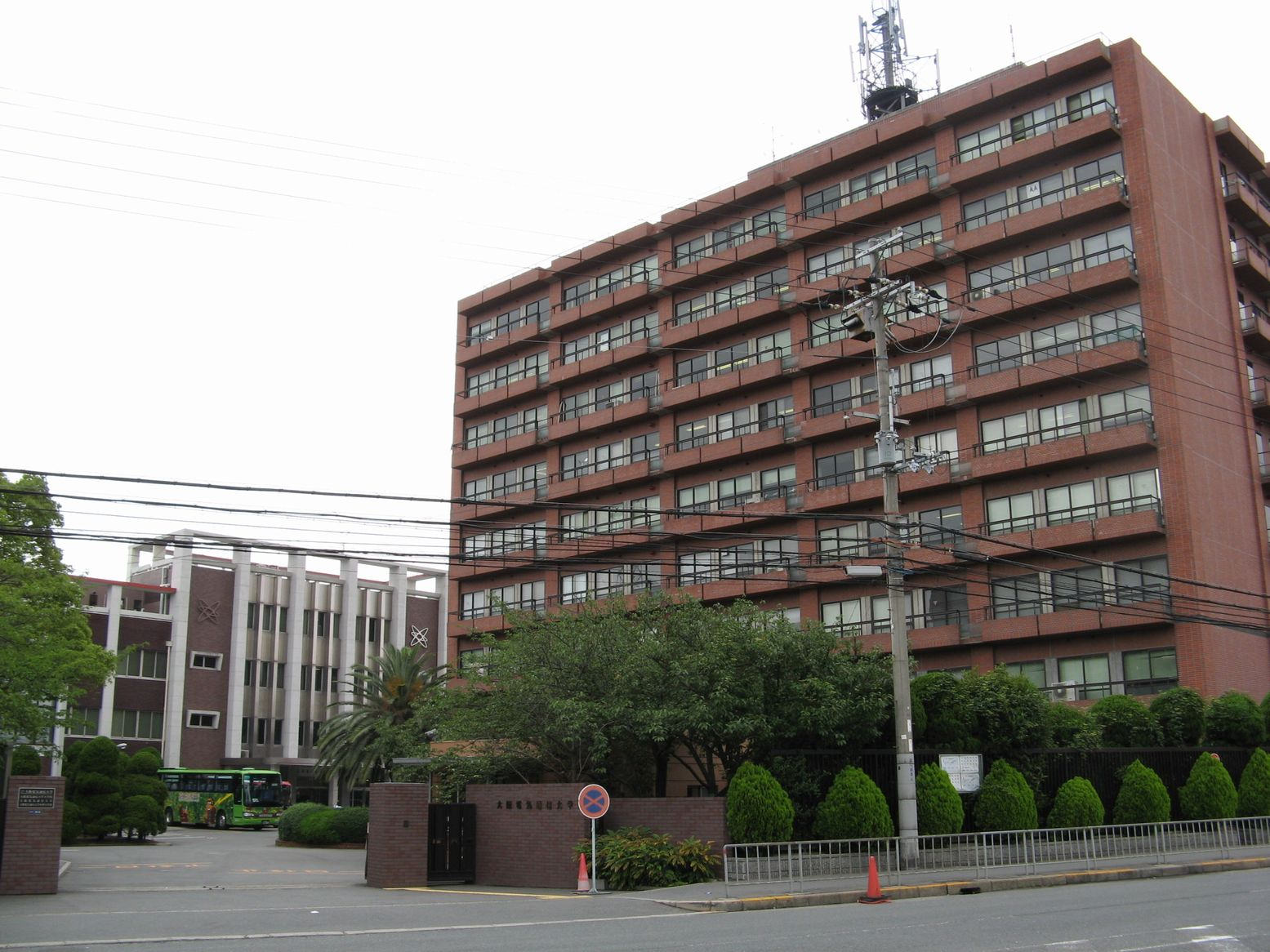
- Type: Private university
- Established: 1961; 65 years ago (Originally in 1924; 102 years ago)
- President: Nobuki Tokura
- Location: Neyagawa, Osaka, Japan
- Campus: Neyagawa, Osaka / Shijonawate, Osaka
- Website: www.osakac.ac.jp/en/

Osaka Electro-Communication University (大阪電気通信大学, Ōsaka denki tsūshin daigaku), OECU is a private university in Japan. The main campus is located in Neyagawa-shi, Osaka Prefecture.

== Faculty and Department ==
In this university, those departments and faculties use a letter for alias.

- E Faculty of Engineering
  - E Department of Electronic Engineering and Computer Science
  - H Department of Electro-Mechanical Engineering
  - J Department of Mechanical Engineering
  - Z Department of Environment Science
  - N Department of Engineering Science
- F Faculty of Biomedical Engineering
  - L Department of Biomedical Engineering
  - Y Physical therapy
  - S Department of Health and Sports Science
- G Faculty of Information and Communication Engineering
  - P Department of Engineering Informatics
  - F Department of Telecommunications and Computer Networks
- H Faculty of Information Science and Arts
  - Q Department of Digital Art and Animation
  - W Department of Digital Games
  - T Department of Computer Science
- I Faculty of Financial Economy
  - A Department of Asset Management
- C 2nd Division, Faculty of Engineering

== Graduate school ==
- Graduate School of Engineering
- Graduate School of Biomedical Engineering
- Graduate school of Information Science and Arts
