= Public transportation in the United States =

Publicly financed transit services in the country

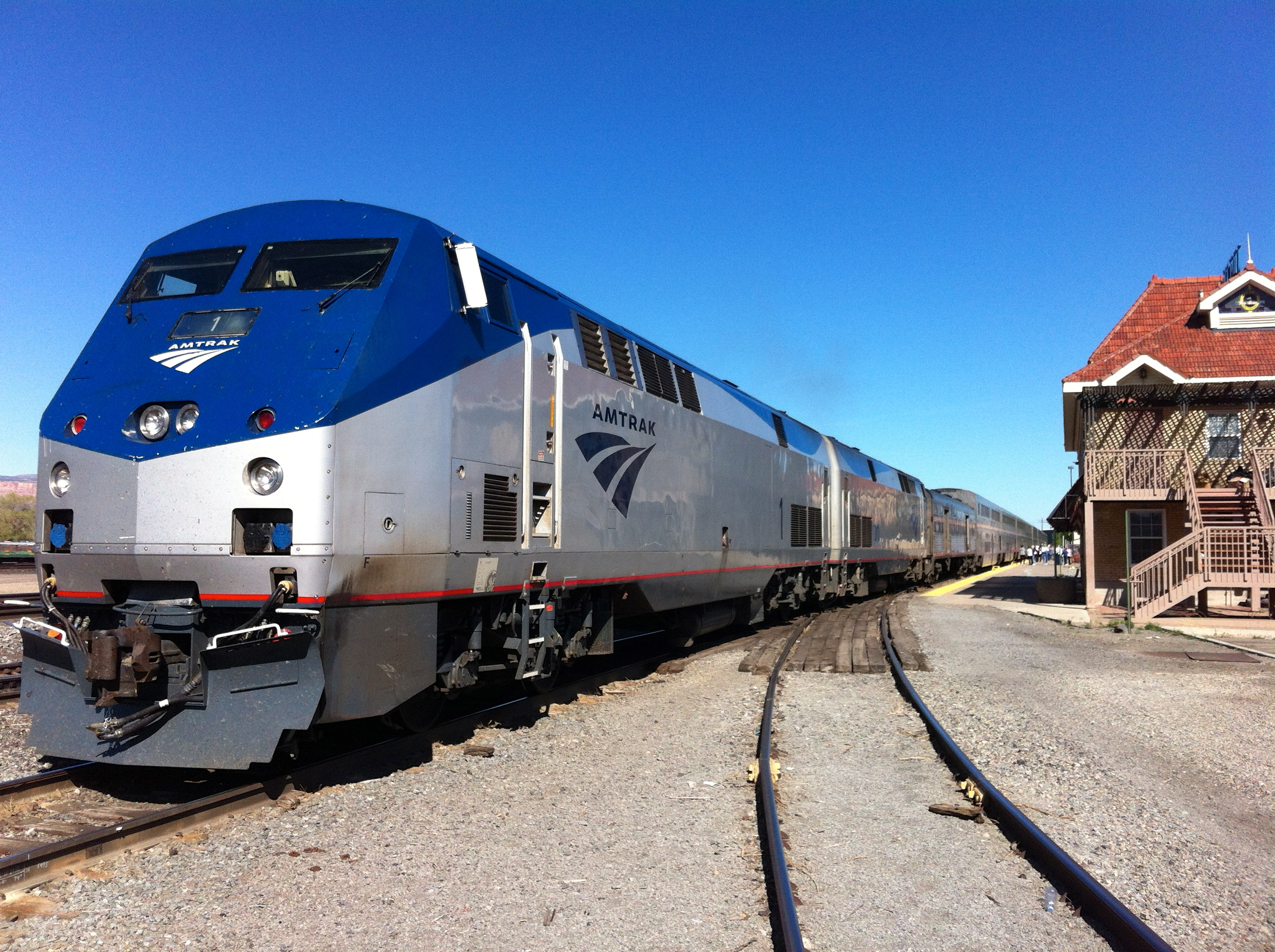
An Amtrak train at Grand Junction station in Grand Junction, Colorado

The United States is served by a wide array of public transportation, including various forms of bus, rail, ferry, and sometimes, airline services. Most public transit systems are in urban areas with enough density and public demand to require public transportation; most US cities have some form of public transit. In more auto-centric suburban localities, public transit is generally less frequent and less common. Most public transit services in the United States are either national, regional/commuter, or local.

In the United States, public transportation is sometimes used synonymously with alternative transportation, meaning every form of mobility except driving alone by automobile. This can sometimes include carpooling, vanpooling, on-demand mobility (i.e. Uber, Lyft, Bird, Lime), infrastructure that is oriented toward bicycles (i.e. bike lanes, sharrows, cycle tracks, and bike trails), and paratransit service.

== Public transport ==
=== Rail ===
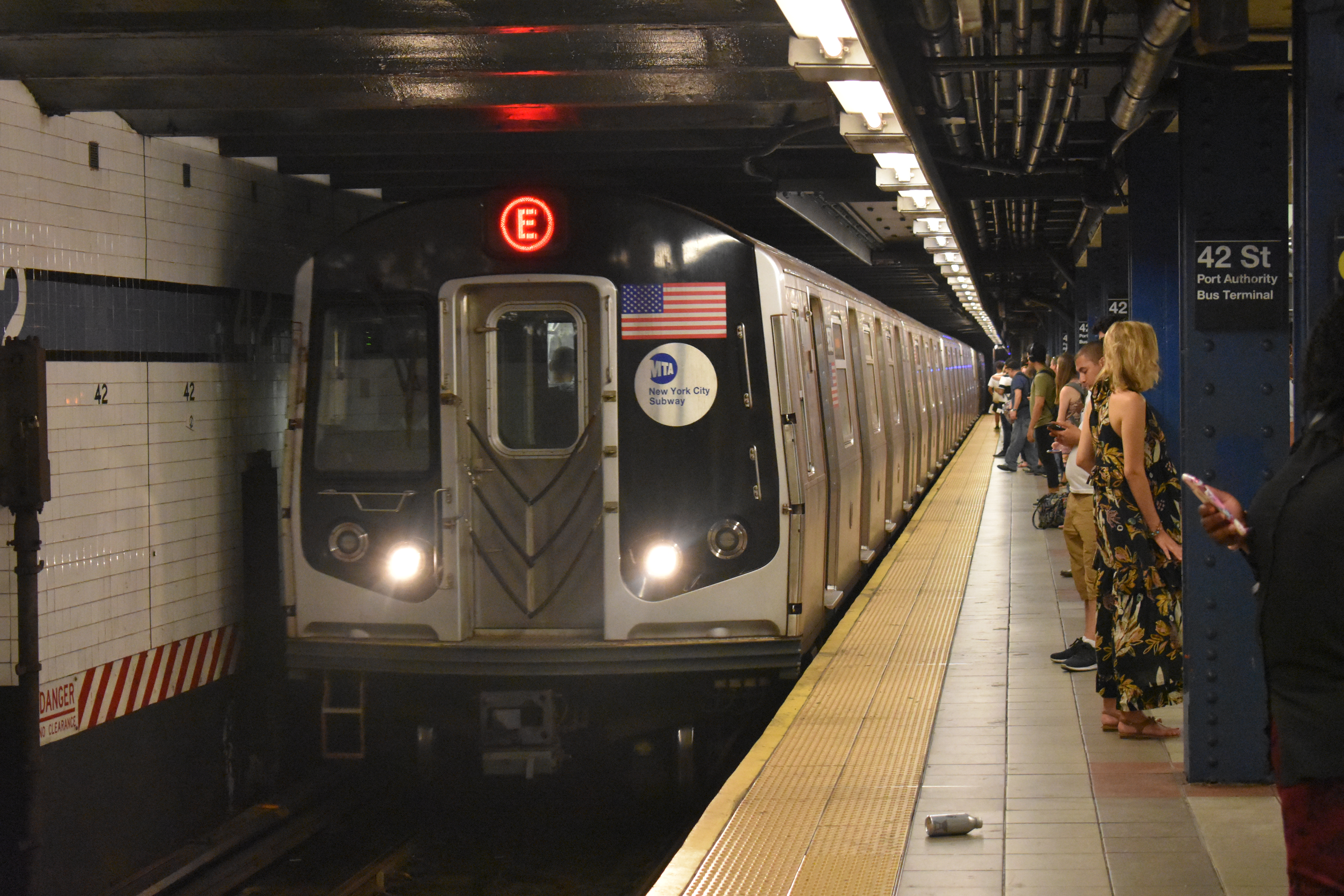
The New York City Subway, the largest heavy rail system in the world by number of stations

Most intercity rail service in the United States is publicly funded at all tiers of government. Amtrak, the national rail system, provides service across the entire contiguous United States, but the frequency of Amtrak service varies. Amtrak's Northeast Corridor is the location of the only operating high speed rail network in the Americas: the Acela Express.

Regional and urban rail services are primarily fixed on a major city or a state. Several cities have light rail systems which operate generally in the core of the city and their surrounding suburbs.

As of 2023, there is only one for-profit, private, intercity passenger rail service in the United States, which is Brightline in Florida.

=== Bus ===
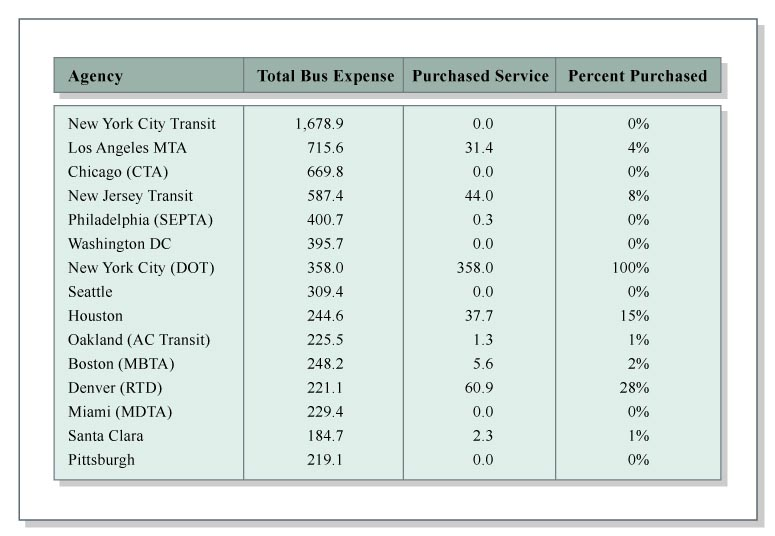
Operating expenses of bus systems in the United States (2004, in millions of dollars) (All agencies with operating cost > $100 million): Agency, Total Bus Expense, Purchased Service.

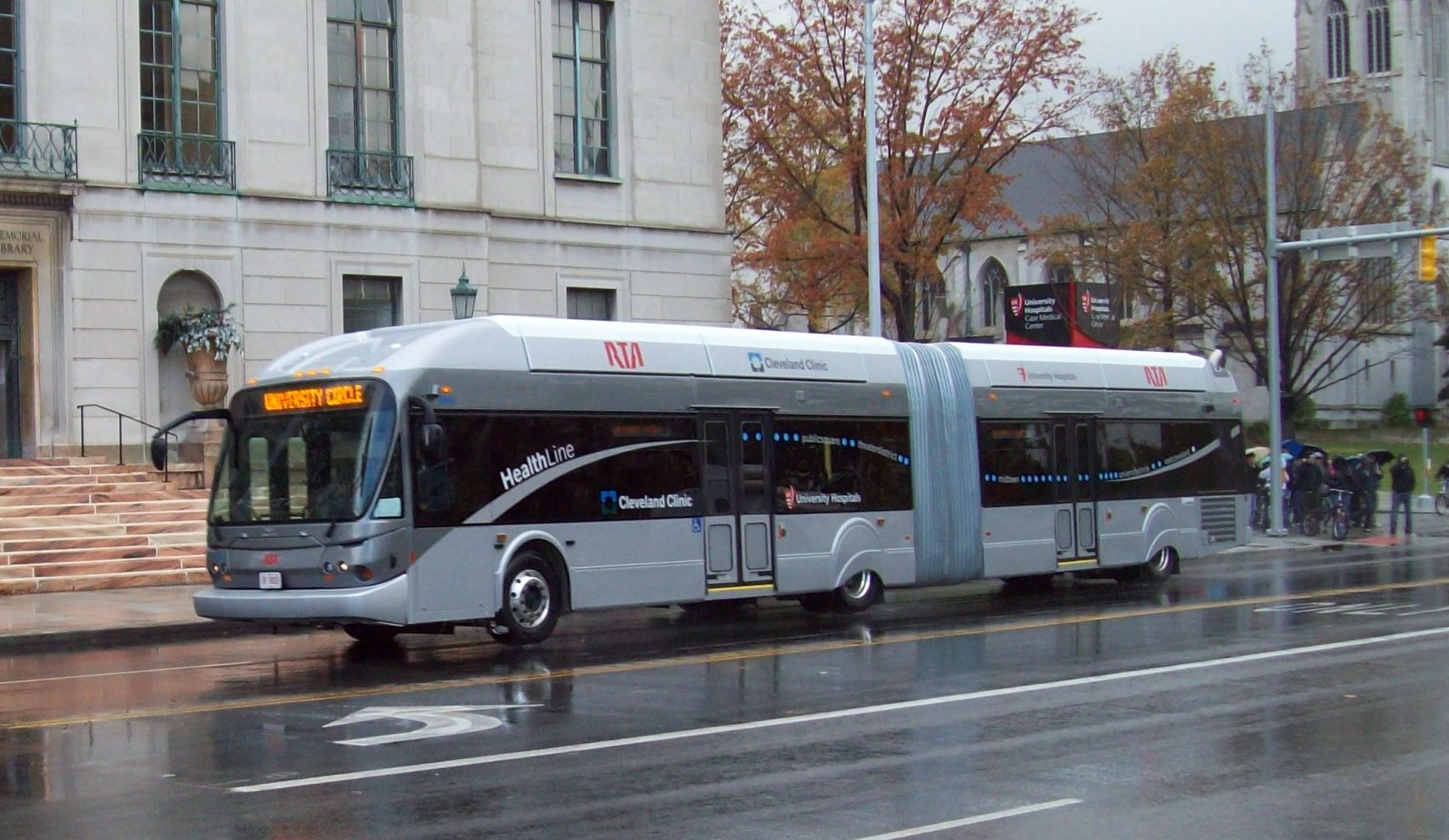
A HealthLine rapid transit bus in Cleveland

There are two common types of urban bus service in the United States: local bus systems in urban areas using diesel or electric buses on the public streets or bus rapid transit (BRT) on its own right-of-way, and intercity buses. Nearly every major city in the United States offers some form of bus service, which have flexible routes on existing streets and make frequent stops. Bus rapid transit attempts to mimic the speed of a light rail system by operating on a separate right-of-way. Most inter-city bus service is private for-profit ventures, although they normally used publicly subsidized highways.

Several coastal cities offer ferry service linking localities that are across large bodies of water where constructing road and railway bridges is not financially viable. Ferry service sometimes is pedestrian only but sometimes may offer platforms for automobiles and public transit vehicles depending on the vessel used.

=== Planes ===
Long-distance public transit too far to travel by rail or bus is typically undertaken by plane. Most airports in major regions are situated on the peripheries of major cities and are publicly owned, while airlines are typically owned by for-profit corporations.

=== Bikes ===
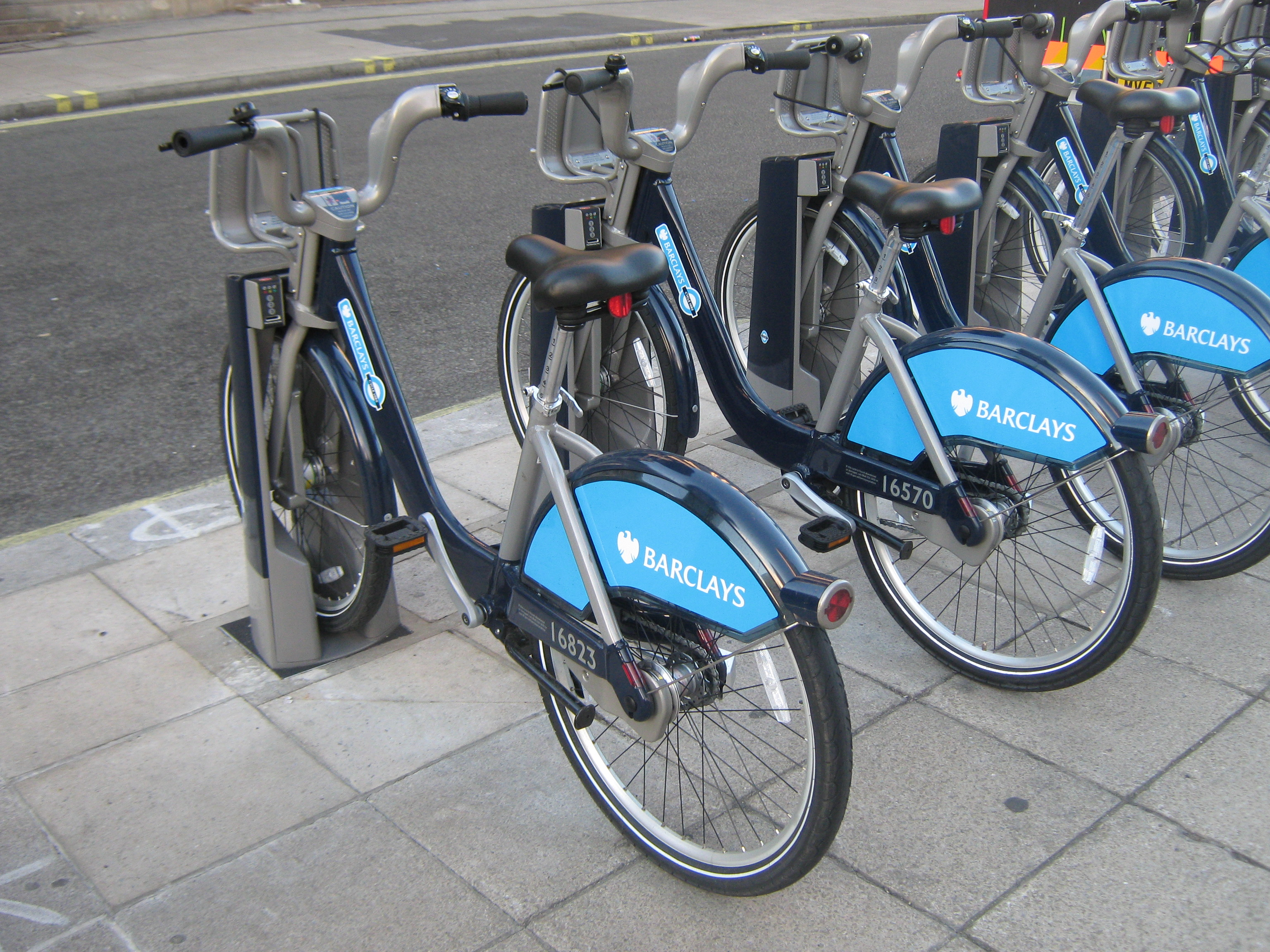
A public bike hire dock operated by barclays

Some cities have public bike sharing companies where you can easily rent a bike for the day from a bike dock. If you live in the city/town/Area you can also buy a bike membership which lowers the price of the bike fee.

City	Company	Operated By-	Notes
New York City, New York	Citi Bike	Lyft	
Boston, Massachusetts	Bluebikes	Lyft	
Chicago, Illinois	Divvy	Lyft	
Philadelphia, Pennsylvania	Indego	Bicycle Transit System (BTS)	
Washington, D.C.	Capital Bikeshare	Lyft	
San Francisco Bay Area, California	Bay Wheels	Lyft	
Denver, Colarado	BCycle	Bicycle Transit System (BTS)	
Los Angeles, California	Metro Bike Share	Bicycle Transit System (BTS)	
Columbus, Ohio	CoGo Bike Share	Lyft	
Portland, Oregon	Biketown	Lyft	Sponsored By Nike

The Lyft Logo

== History ==
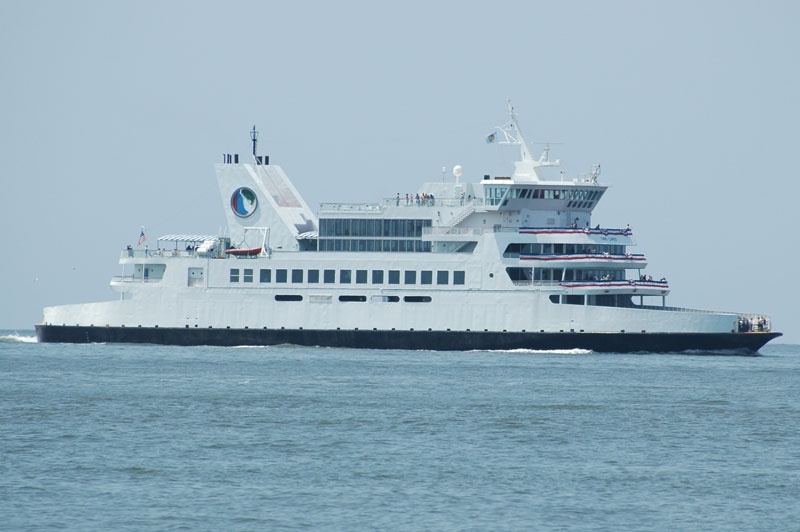
Cape May–Lewes Ferry, connecting South Jersey with Delaware across the Delaware Bay

=== 20th century ===
After the rise of automobiles in the first half of the 20th century, urban transit companies went out of business and ridership declined.

=== 21st century ===
In the 21st century, the U.S. has a low level of public transport compared to other developed Western nations, which has been relatively consistent according to a study covering 1980 through 2010.

A 2012 comparison among 14 western countries found the US in last place in annual public transport trips per capita with 24 trips. The next to last country was the Netherlands with 51 trips and Switzerland was ranked first with 237.

Reasons for the U.S. having a lower demand for public transport than Europe include lower density cities, tax policy, and the high car ownership in American cities. In some cities, there has been opposition to public transit on the grounds that it would increase crime.

== Individual modes ==
=== Rail transit ===
As of March 2020, Amtrak provides public railway transportation on 35 lines, with services concentrated in the Pacific Northwest, Northeast, California, and the Midwest. Amtrak also operates its own long distance bus system to support its train network. The Auto Train is available from Washington, DC to Orlando, Florida that is capable of carrying along passengers’ vehicles.

In 2021, Amtrak plans to deploy a fleet of 28 new Acela trainsets to serve the Northeast Corridor. The first of these trains are currently undergoing a nine month high-speed testing phase and will include personal comforts such as outlets, USB ports, improved Wi-Fi access, and an overall improvement in interior space design allowing 25 percent more passengers. The trains will travel between Boston and Washington D.C. multiple times a day, a route 3.5 million customers took in 2019.

=== Bus transit ===
==== Local bus services ====
===== Bus rapid transit =====
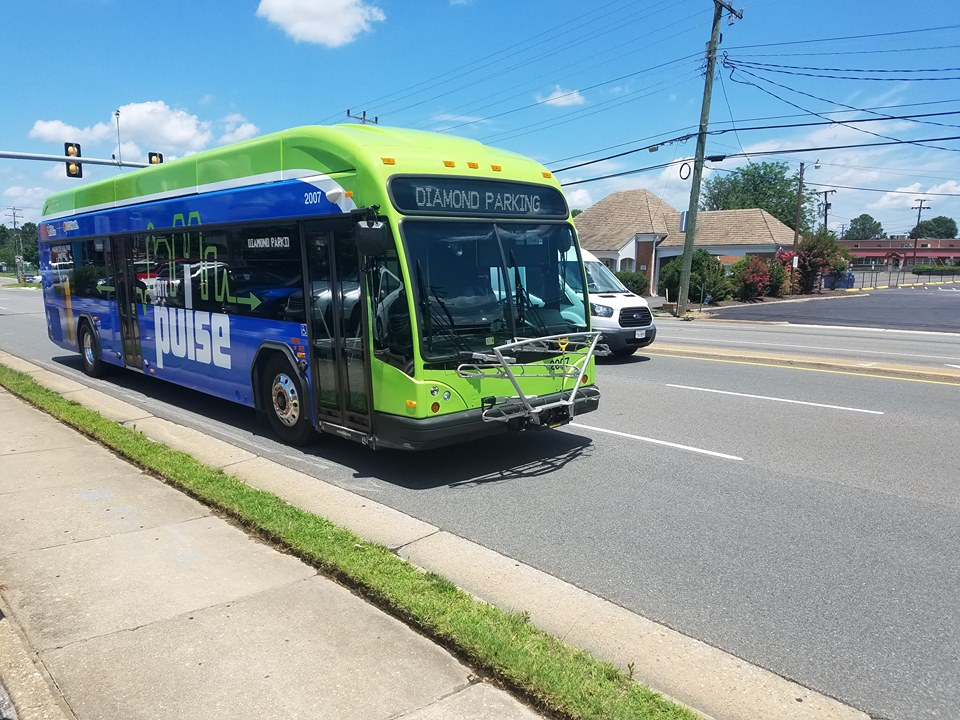
GRTC Pulse bus rapid transit, which has serviced Richmond, Virginia since June 2018

Bus rapid transit (BRT), also called a busway, is a bus-based public transport system designed to improve capacity and reliability relative to a conventional bus system. Typically, a BRT system includes roadways that are dedicated to buses, and gives priority to buses at intersections where buses may interact with other traffic; alongside design features to improve accessibility and reduce delays caused by passengers boarding or leaving buses, or purchasing fares. BRT aims to provide "fast, comfortable, and cost-effective services at metro-level capacities".

In the United States several moderately sized cities have BRT as an alternative to light rail due to perceived costs and political will. Notable examples of moderately sized cities with BRT as their fulcrum of public transportation include the Silver Line in Grand Rapids, Michigan, the GRTC Pulse in Richmond, Virginia, and the BusPlus in Albany, New York. Several satellite and suburban cities to larger cities also have bus rapid transit systems as secondary public transit services to light rail and commuter rail. This includes the Denver suburb of Fort Collins' MAX Bus Rapid Transit system, and the Metroway system in the Washington, D.C. suburbs of Arlington and Alexandria, Virginia.

Some major cities have their own BRT routes within city limits that function as their own rapid transit line, or as auxiliary routes to the rail lines in their respective city. In Cleveland, the HealthLine, which is considered a standard for BRT in the United States, serves most of the city. Minneapolis has the Red Line, and Los Angeles has the F Line, which plans to upgrade to light rail.

===== Urban bus transit =====
Local bus systems are categorized as public transit, especially for large metropolitan transit networks and in medium or small cities across the U.S. that rely on a bus network. These networks rely on diesel engine buses usually with fare controls and run on public streets. A public transit network generally orders vehicles to its own specifications as to length and passenger capacity, seated and standing. Buses meet standards set forth in the ADA and ADA updates to accommodate riders using a wheelchair, and information systems for riders with vision or hearing impairments. Electric-powered buses are appearing in some transit systems in the 2020 decade, as transit operators shift away from diesel fuel and its air pollutants, to this newer technology.

Some urban transit buses are built as articulated, longer vehicles to serve routes with high passenger demand. These buses bend midway, with an extra set of wheels.

Large metro areas in the US have bus networks with frequent scheduled service at a low fare, and in recent years in the 21st century, riders can learn the time of the next bus from software applications that work on a smart phone. New York City, Boston, Philadelphia, Chicago, Atlanta, Seattle, and Los Angeles County are a few of the places offering this type of service, with transfers between bus routes, or between bus and rail, to serve more trips.

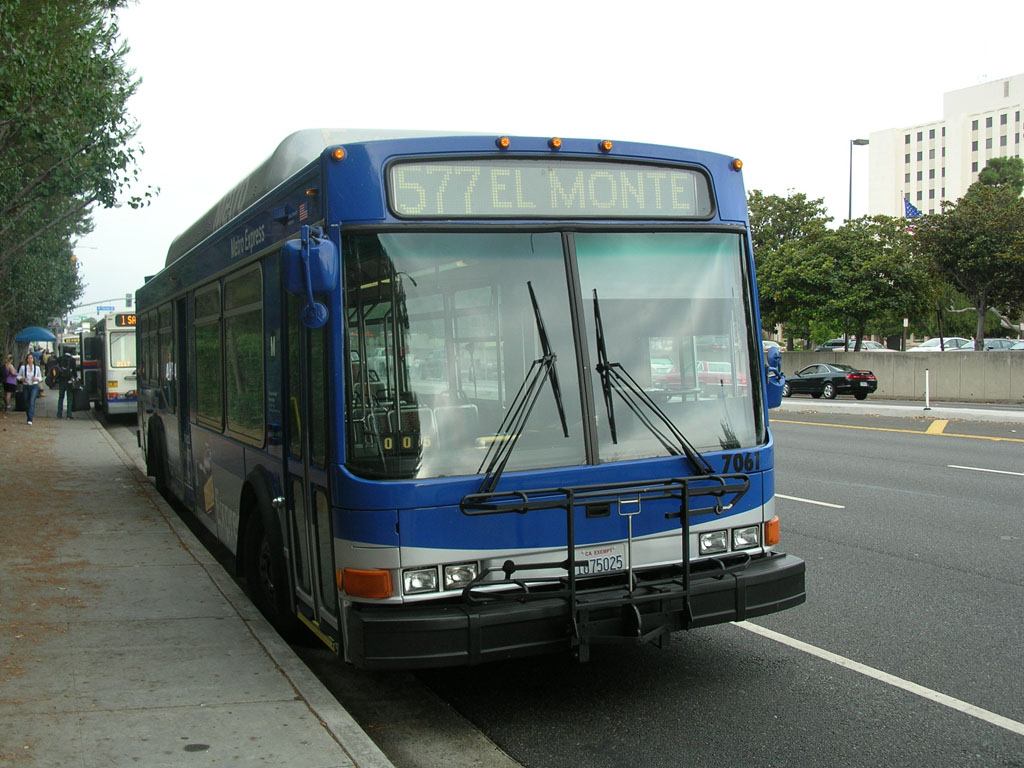
A Metro bus in Los Angeles

Towns or smaller cities with a university campus may have excellent bus networks tailored to their market of riders. Ames, Iowa, for example, offers this sort of bus network with its CyRide system.

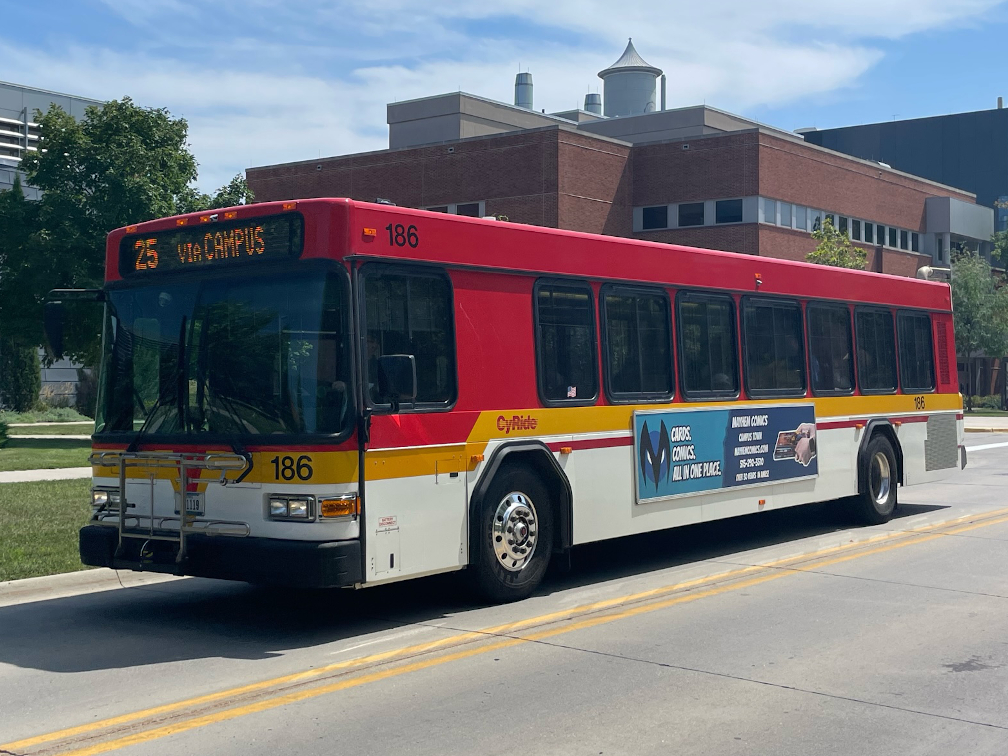
A Gillig bus in CyRide service in 2023

In the Chicago metropolitan area, there are two large transit bus networks. One is operated by the Chicago Transit Authority in Chicago proper and the other network is operated by the regional agency PACE, serving all the surrounding suburban towns and counties. Fares and transfers are coordinated in that region.

A subset of urban transit buses is the higher-fare, longer distance bus for people commuting to work in one or two US metropolitan areas. Those operate where no train service is in place to meet the demand, such as some routes between New Jersey's suburbs and Manhattan in New York City, although there may also be regularly scheduled bus routes. These buses may have more seating than typical buses, since the trip is longer. Providers of such service may call the bus a coach as a marketing term.

=== Ferry transit ===
Information on ferries as public transportation in the United States is available from the FTA National Transit Database and the National Census of Ferry Operators, a bi-yearly census completed by the Bureau of Transportation Statistics.

According to the 2022 version of the National Census of Ferry Operators, 91.6 million passengers were carried on ferries in the United States and its territories.

== Usage ==
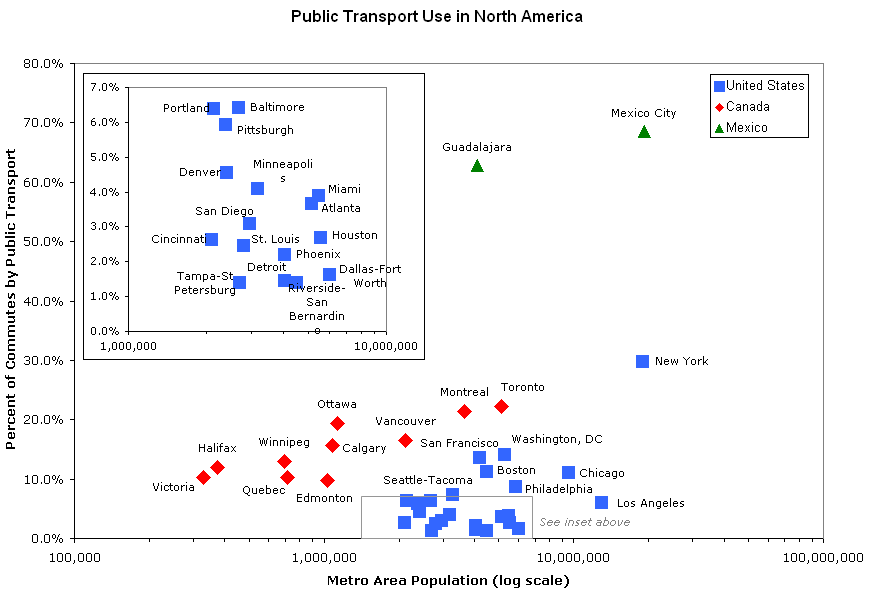
Some North American cities arranged by size along the horizontal axis and public transportation use on the vertical axis. Many U.S. cities have lower public transit use than New York and some similarly sized Canadian and Mexican cities.

Information on transit ridership and usage in the United States is available from the National Transit Database from the Federal Transit Administration.

The number of miles traveled by vehicles in the United States fell by 3.6% in 2008, while the number of trips taken on mass transit increased by 4.0%. At least part of the drop in urban driving can be explained by the 4% increase in the use of public transportation.

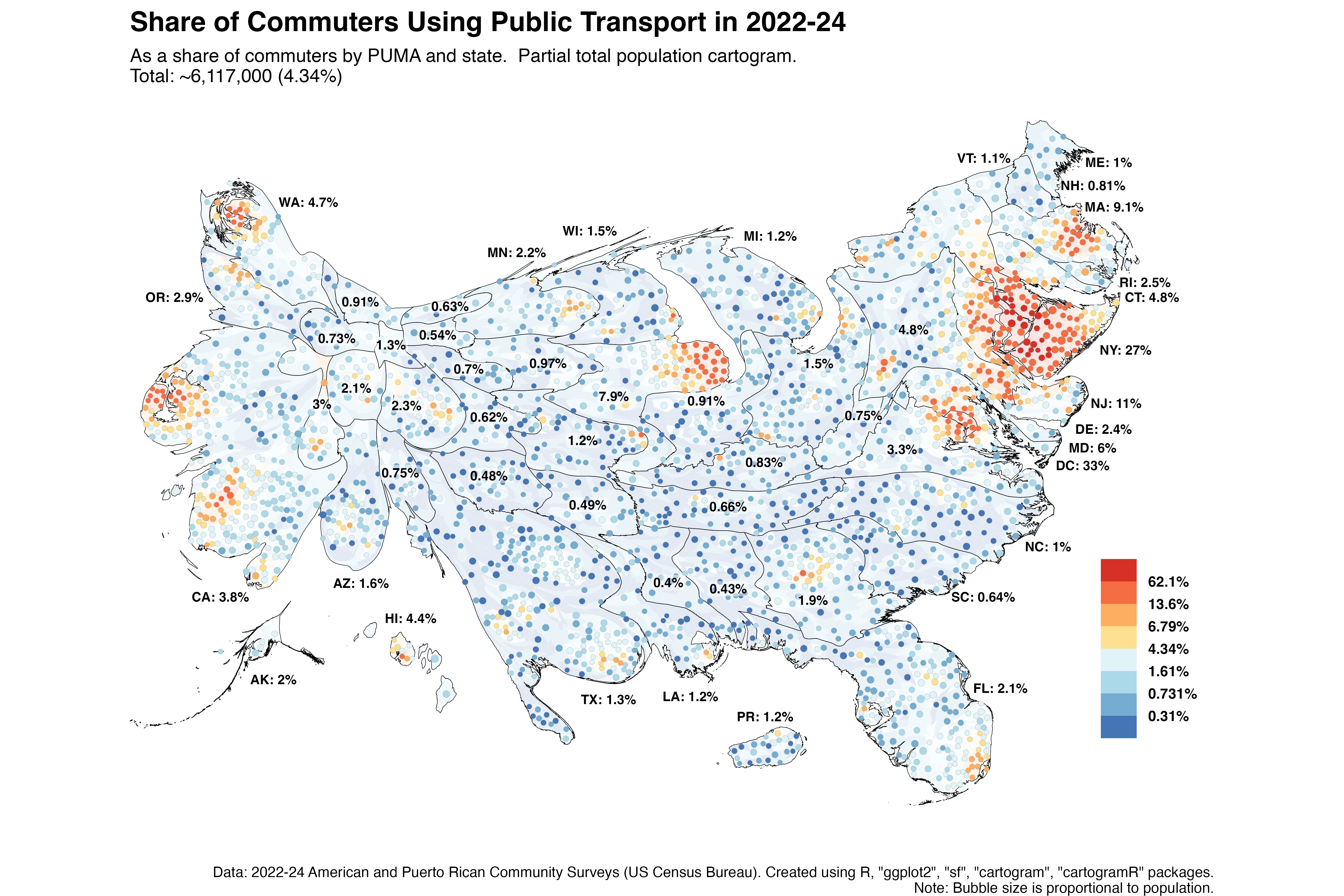
Cartogram of Public Transport Use in the US in 2024

About one in every three users of mass transit in the United States and two-thirds of the nation's rail riders live in New York City and its suburbs.

== Geography ==
Most medium-sized cities have some form of local public transportation, usually a network of fixed bus routes. Larger cities often have metro rail systems (also known as heavy rail in the U.S.) and/or light rail systems for high-capacity passenger service within the urban area, and commuter rail to serve the surrounding metropolitan area.

Information on the geographic extent of fixed-guideway and fixed-route transit services in United States, as gleaned from transit providers' General Transit Feed Specification (GTFS) Schedule data, is available through the National Transit Map, a web map from the Bureau of Transportation Statistics and the Federal Transit Administration.

=== Cities ===
Region	Name	Locale	Type
New York City	Metropolitan Transportation Authority (MTA); Includes: Long Island Rail Road, Metro-North Railroad, New York City Subway, MTA Regional Bus Operations, and Staten Island Railway	New York City, Long Island, Lower Hudson Valley, Coastal Connecticut	Commuter rail, local and express bus, subway, and bus rapid transit
New York City	Port Authority Trans-Hudson (PATH)	Newark / Hudson County, New Jersey and Manhattan, New York	Rapid transit
Los Angeles	Los Angeles County Metropolitan Transportation Authority (Metro)	Los Angeles County, California	Rapid transit (subway), Light rail, Bus, Bus rapid transit
Los Angeles	Metrolink	Southern California	Commuter rail
Chicago	Northern Illinois Transit Authority (NITA) Includes: Chicago Transit Authority (CTA), Metra, and Pace	Chicago metropolitan area	Bus, commuter rail, paratransit, rapid transit (Chicago "L")
Houston	Metropolitan Transit Authority of Harris County (METRO)	Houston	Bus Service, Light Rail, Paratransit Services, Express Lanes
Phoenix	Valley Metro	Phoenix metropolitan area	Light rail, bus, BRT, Vanpool
Philadelphia	SEPTA	Philadelphia metropolitan area	Commuter rail, interurban, rapid transit, streetcar, transit bus, and trolleybus
Austin	Capital Metropolitan Transportation Authority	Greater Austin	Commuter Rail, Local, Express, Bus Transit and Van Pool
San Antonio	VIA Metropolitan Transit	Greater San Antonio	Local, Express, Bus Rapid Transit
Atlanta	Metropolitan Atlanta Rapid Transit Authority (MARTA)	Atlanta Metropolitan Area	Bus routes, bus rapid transit, rail track, rapid transit, and streetcar
Atlanta	Atlanta Streetcar	Atlanta	Streetcar
Baltimore	Maryland Transit Administration (MTA Maryland)	Baltimore-Washington Metropolitan Area	Bus, light rail, heavy rail, commuter rail
Baltimore	Charm City Circulator	Baltimore	Bus, watertaxi
Greater Boston	Massachusetts Bay Transportation Authority		Bus, bus rapid transit, light rail, commuter rail, trolleybus, and ferryboat
Erie and Niagara counties, New York	Niagara Frontier Transportation Authority		Bus, light rail, and rapid transit
New Jersey, Manhattan, Rockland and Orange counties, New York, and Philadelphia County, Pennsylvania	New Jersey Transit		Commuter rail, light rail, and bus
Charlotte-Mecklenburg, North Carolina	Lynx Rapid Transit Services		Light rail and streetcar (bus rapid transit planned)
Cuyahoga County, Ohio	RTA Rapid Transit		Rapid transit, light rail, bus rapid transit, and bus
Dallas, Texas	Dallas Area Rapid Transit		Bus, light rail, commuter rail, streetcar
Denver Metro Area, Colorado	Regional Transportation District		Bus, light rail, and commuter rail
Los Angeles County, California	Metro Rail		Rapid transit and light rail
Greater Miami	Miami-Dade Transit		Rapid transit, people mover, bus rapid transit, and transit bus
Minneapolis-Saint Paul metropolitan area	Metro		Light rail, commuter rail and bus rapid transit
City of New Orleans and Orleans Parish, Louisiana	New Orleans Regional Transit Authority		Bus, heritage streetcar
Allegheny County and bordering portions of Beaver, Washington, Westmoreland and Armstrong counties	Port Authority of Allegheny County		Public transit, light rail, bus rapid transit, and inclined-plane railway (funicular)
Portland metropolitan area, Oregon	TriMet, Portland Streetcar		Bus, Light rail, Commuter rail, Streetcar
Sacramento, California	Sacramento Regional Transit District		Bus and light rail
Greater St. Louis	MetroLink		Light rail
Wasatch Front, Utah	Utah Transit Authority		Bus, light rail (including TRAX), commuter rail, and streetcar
San Diego County, California	San Diego Metropolitan Transit System		Buses, bus rapid transit, light rail, commuter rail, paratransit, and streetcar
San Francisco Bay Area	Bay Area Rapid Transit		Rapid transit
San Francisco	San Francisco Municipal Railway		Bus, trolleybus, light rail, streetcar, and cable cars
San Jose, California	Santa Clara Valley Transportation Authority		Bus and light rail
Puget Sound region, Washington	Sound Transit		Regional express bus, commuter rail, and light rail
The District of Columbia and parts of Maryland and northern Virginia	Washington Metropolitan Area Transit Authority		Rapid transit (Washington Metro), bus (Metrobus), and paratransit (MetroAccess)
Downtown Las Vegas starting from close to McCarran International Airport	Las Vegas Monorail		Elevated monorail currently connecting local hotels and the Las Vegas Convention Center

== Funding ==
American mass transit is funded by a combination of local, state, and federal agencies. At the federal level, the Federal Transit Administration (FTA) provides financial assistance and technical assistance to state governments and local transit providers. From FY 2005 to FY 2009, the funding scheme for the FTA was regulated by the SAFETEA-LU bill, which appropriated $286.4 billion in guaranteed funding. The FTA awards grants through several programs, such as the New Starts program and Transit Investments for Greenhouse Gas and Energy Reduction (TIGGER) program.

Historically, public transportation in the United States has been reliant on private investments. Congress first authorized money for public transport under the Urban Mass Transportation Act (UMTA) of 1964, with $150 million per year. Under the UMTA of 1970, this amount rose to $3.1 billion per year. Since then, ridership has risen from 6.6 billion in the mid-1970s to 10.2 billion today. None of the major transit systems in the US generate enough revenue to cover their operating expenses, but those with the highest percentages include the San Francisco Bay Area Rapid Transit District with 71.6 percent and the Washington, DC metropolitan rail system with 62.1 percent.

The most widely used source for public transport funds in the United States is general sales tax. Whereas most countries usually don’t put motoring taxes to a specific use, there are instances in the United States where this revenue is earmarked to fund public transport. For example, bridge tolls on the Golden Gate Bridge in San Francisco are used to subsidize local bus and ferry services. In contrast to other Western countries, public transport use is low and mostly by the poor, which makes it harder to raise additional funds. In response to reductions in Federal support for public transport, individual states and cities sometimes levy local taxes to maintain their transit systems.

== Legislation ==
On June 26, 2008, the House passed the Saving Energy Through Public Transportation Act (H.R. 6052), which gives grants to mass transit authorities to lower fares for commuters pinched at the pump and expand transit services. The bill also:

- Requires that all Federal agencies offer their employees transit pass transportation fringe benefits. Federal agencies within the National Capital Region have successful transit pass benefits programs.
- Increases the Federal cost-share of grants for construction of additional parking facilities at the end of subway lines from 80 to 100 percent to cover an increase in the number of people taking mass transit.
- Creates a pilot program for vanpool demonstration projects in urban and rural areas.
- Increases federal help for local governments to purchase alternative fuel buses, locomotives and ferries from 90 to 100 percent.

== See also ==
- Federal Transit Administration
- Paratransit
- Rail transport in the United States
- Light rail in the United States
- High-speed rail in the United States
- Transportation in the United States
- Great American streetcar scandal
- List of bus transit systems in the United States
