= Veraldi =

Veraldi is a surname of Italian origin. Notable people with the surname include:

- Attilio Veraldi, Italian novelist
- Dennis Veraldi, American CEO of the Port Authority of Allegheny County
- Donato Tommaso Veraldi (born 1941), Italian politician
- Lewis Veraldi, Ford Motor Company vice president
