= MMT =

MMT may refer to:

== Economics ==
- Modern Monetary Theory, a branch of economic theory

== Geography ==
- 4QMMT (or MMT), one of the Dead Sea Scrolls
- Myanmar Time (UTC+06:30)

== Mathematics ==
- MacMahon's master theorem, a result in enumerative combinatorics and linear algebra

== Technology ==
- MMT (Eclipse), a software project
- Multimode manual transmission, in a motor vehicle
- MPEG media transport, a digital container standard

== Science ==
- Methylcyclopentadienyl manganese tricarbonyl, an organomanganese compound
- MMT Observatory, an astronomical observatory in Arizona, USA
- MMt, one million metric tons
- Montmorillonite, a clay

== Music ==
- Magical Mystery Tour, a record by the English rock band the Beatles

== Television ==
- Miyagi Television Broadcasting, a Japanese commercial broadcaster

== Transportation ==
- Marshalltown Municipal Transit, in Marshalltown, Iowa
