= William Millar (transportation executive) =

William Henry Millar (born August 7, 1954) is the former president of the American Public Transportation Association. From October 1, 1984 until October 31, 1996, he was the CEO of the Port Authority of Allegheny County, which serves the Pittsburgh metropolitan area. In spring 1992, he dealt with a crippling 28-day work stoppage strike that was only resolved by the Pennsylvania Supreme Court, with an agreement not reached until eight months later.

Preceded by James R. Maloney	Port Authority of Allegheny County CEO; 1984 – 1996	Succeeded by Allen Biehler
