= Roadeo =

Motor race

A roadeo is a competitive driving event for motor vehicle drivers. Named as a portmanteau of "road" and "rodeo", these competitions have been held for a range of different vehicles since at least 1937. Typically, drivers compete to pass through a variety of obstacles in the smallest amount of time, although the competitions may include other components, such as a written test.

== Etymology ==
The term "roadeo" is a portmanteau in which the word rodeo is combined with the word road which here represents motor vehicle, since motor vehicles are normally driven on a road. A "roadeo" is then a "rodeo for cars" in that roadeos involve the handling of motor vehicles just as rodeos involve handling livestock. According to Louise M. Ackerman writing in American Speech, the word "roadeo" was probably first used in the 1950s, and its introduction was partially driven by the popularity of rodeos. Of course, roadeos are also held for a variety of other vehicles, such as buses (including transit buses and school buses) and trucks (especially semi-trailer trucks).

== History ==
The first roadeos were mainly events for truck drivers. For example, the National Truck Roadeo (now the National Truck Driving Championships, also known as the National Truck Driving Championships Roadeo) was founded in 1937 by the American Trucking Associations for the purpose of publicly displaying the "incredible degree of safety, courtesy, and driving judgement [that drivers] had achieved".

Since the earliest roadeos, roadeo competitions have been started for a wide variety of commercially operated vehicles. In addition to transit and school buses, competitions are available for minivan drivers and paratransit bus drivers, to name only two of the classes of vehicles served. Even within truck roadeos, vehicles are usually divided by class, such as the International Bus Roadeo, which divides transit buses into 35- and 40-foot divisions, and various truck roadeos, which divide trucks by length and weight. One roadeo was held in Orlando, Florida for motorscooters and small motorcycles.

== Obstacles ==
The obstacles that drivers have to navigate may vary among competitions, but usually measure drivers' abilities to negotiate narrow paths, tight turns, or both while under a time limit. At times, the clearance drivers are given by an obstacle are quite small; one obstacle that bus drivers have to navigate requires them to stop with their front bumpers less than six inches away from a traffic cone. Minimum speed requirements, besides the time limit usually imposed on a course as a whole, can also be used by obstacle course designers to increase the difficulty of an obstacle. The obstacles in a roadeo are usually meant to test drivers' ability to handle situations that would come up during usual day-to-day driving. Some transit bus roadeos include simulated bus stops, school bus roadeos tend to include simulated loading and unloading events, and most roadeos require drivers to navigate very tight spaces in their vehicles, such as those that would be encountered while driving an eighteen-wheeler.

== Other components ==
Some roadeos go beyond merely testing driving skills. Most roadeos have a written component, usually a test drivers have to take before they compete in the driving events. Maintenance competitions are part of many roadeos, especially those involving transit buses; for instance, the International Bus Roadeo includes a bus maintenance challenge in which bus maintenance teams have to diagnose and repair bus mechanical issues. Adding to the challenge, mechanical issues sometimes need to be diagnosed under a strict time limit. It also has added a "Customer Service Challenge", which "allows bus operators to test their customer service skills in some distinctive customer interface scenarios".

== Safety ==
Since the first roadeos, one goal shared by nearly every roadeo is safety. Many roadeos require drivers to have an excellent safety record in order to be able to participate in them. Some, like the International Bus Roadeo and the National Truck Driving Championships, require drivers to have been completely accident-free for a year before the competition, counting accidents that were not the driver's fault.

=== In management ===
Roadeos have been praised as a safety training exercise. Benefits of roadeos include encouraging safety and productivity in the truck driving workforce, as well as improving morale. As it was implemented in one region, bus employees "completed a written examination, an oral interview, a pre-trip inspection, and demonstrated their driving skills through a prescribed course".

== Notable roadeos ==
In the United States, there are a number of national-level roadeos for which drivers qualify by doing well in regional roadeos. These national roadeos usually serve one or a few types of vehicles; for example, the International Bus Roadeo only allows transit bus drivers to compete.

=== International Bus Roadeo ===
The International Bus Roadeo is hosted by the American Public Transportation Association and includes bus driving and bus maintenance competitions.

=== National Truck Driving Championships ===
Described as a "glorified trucking championship" and as an "annual Super Bowl of knowledge, truck driving skills, and safety habits", the National Truck Driving Championships is the final level of the American Trucking Associations-sponsored roadeos, above the state-level Truck Driving Championships. The championships have a number of similarities to the International Bus Roadeo regarding how it operates, including the requirements for drivers (i.e. one accident-free year) and the pre-trip inspection test.
