= Stephen Bland =

American businessman

Stephen G. Bland (c.1962) is the chief executive officer of WeGo Public Transit and the Regional Transportation Authority in Nashville, Tennessee. He was appointed MTA CEO in July 2014, and officially began his new duties on August 25, 2014. Previously, he was the Director/CEO of the Port Authority of Allegheny County serving metropolitan Pittsburgh, Pennsylvania. He was chief executive from June 12, 2006 until his employment was terminated without cause by a 5 to 3 vote of the Port Authority Board on February 1, 2013. with the County Chief Executive wishing for more direct control of the agency.

Prior to coming to Pittsburgh he was the director of the Capital District Transportation Authority in Albany, New York from 2002 to 2006 and York, Pennsylvania's Rabbit Transit CEO for eight years. Bland also was chairman of the Pennsylvania Public Transportation Association board of directors and the New York Public Transit Association as well as positions as Rabbit Transit general manager (3 years), the manager of operations planning for Syracuse's Central New York RTA (4 years), general manager at Cape Ann Transportation Authority in Gloucester, Massachusetts (1 year) and vehicle maintenance system coordinator at Dallas Area Rapid Transit (1 year).

In the summer of 2012 Bland was considered among the top 2 candidates for the CEO position of both MARTA and the Jacksonville Transportation Authority as well as a featured speaker at Carnegie Mellon University's Heinz College.

== Pittsburgh initiatives ==
Bland was championed by area bike riders for his transit innovations that was inclusive of bicyclists, with such things as making the bus fleet completely bike capable in just 4 years, specifically training drivers and staff on bike needs and removing all restrictions on bikes with light rail. Mr. Bland was also widely credited by the business community and other public leadership with spearheading significant improvements in the Port Authority's efficiency, leading a complete redesign of transit services resulting in greatly improved service efficiencies and negotiating two consecutive concessionary collective bargaining agreements with its employee unions.

== Private sector ==
Since February 2013 Bland has been a principal at Pittsburgh-based TransforMotion.

| Preceded by Dennis Veraldi | Port Authority of Allegheny County Director; 2006–2013 | Succeeded by Ellen McLean |
