= Paul Skoutelas =

Paul Skoutelas is an American transit manager. He was born in Pittsburgh, Pennsylvania and got his start in that regions Port Authority of Allegheny County transit agency. In 1991, he was named President of Lynx serving metropolitan Orlando, Florida and in 1997, he came home to lead the Port Authority of Allegheny County retiring on September 12, 2005.

In semi-retirement Skoutelas has been a consultant for Parsons Brinckerhoff as the Transit Market Leader for the Americas since late 2005. Skoutelas retains a license as an active professional engineer and has both an M.B.A. and an M.S.

In 2018, Skoutelas was appointed President/CEO of the American Public Transportation Association in Washington, DC.

Preceded by Allen Biehler	Port Authority of Allegheny County CEO; 1997 – 2005	Succeeded by Dennis Veraldi
