= Marshalltown Municipal Transit =

Provider of mass transportation in Marshall County, Iowa

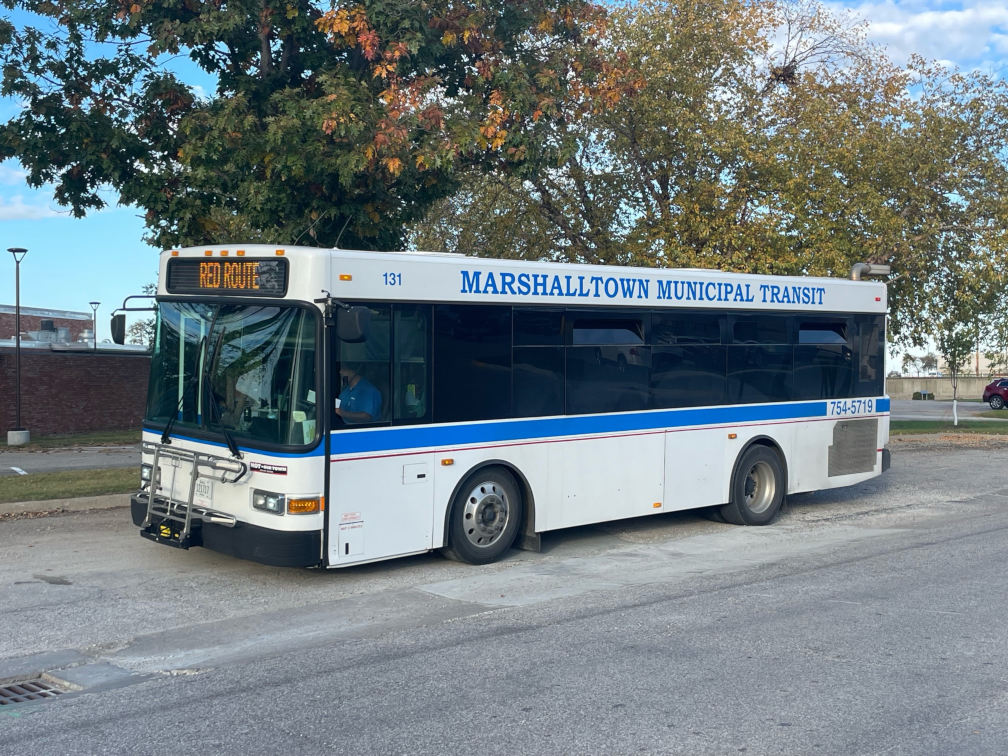
- Marshalltown Municipal Transit #131, a 2013 Gillig Low Floor 29'.
- Headquarters: 905 E Main St, Marshalltown, IA 50158
- Locale: Marshalltown, Iowa
- Service area: Marshall County, Iowa
- Service type: Bus service, paratransit
- Routes: 11
- Hubs: Fisher Community Center
- Fleet: 10 (9 buses & 1 cutaway)
- Annual ridership: 75,629 (2019)
- Website: marshalltown-ia.gov/368/Marshalltown-Municipal-Transit

Marshalltown Municipal Transit, also stylized as mmt, is the primary provider of mass transportation in Marshalltown, Iowa with eleven routes serving the region. As of 2019, the system provided 75,629 rides over 9,072 annual vehicle revenue hours with 6 buses and 3 paratransit vehicles.

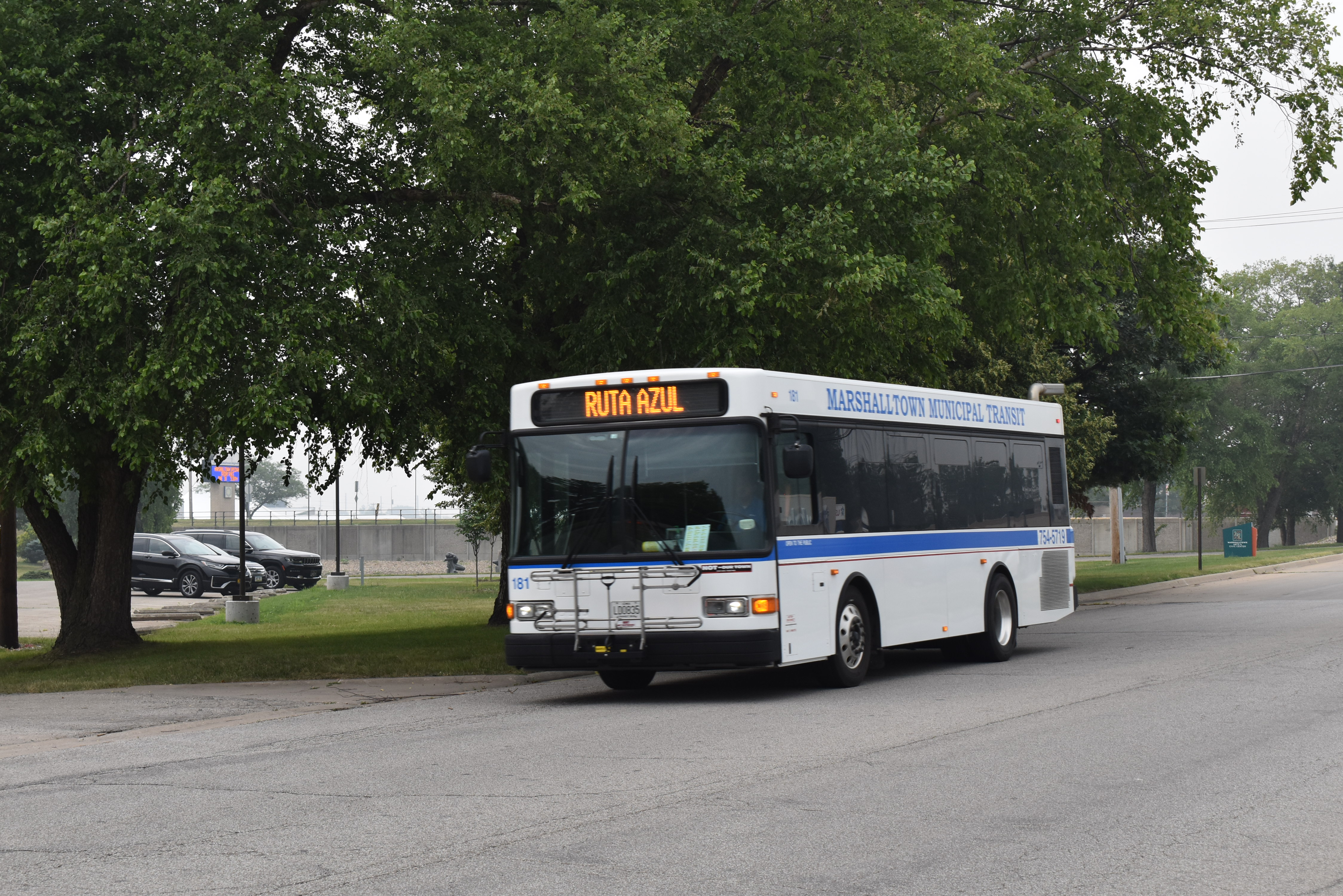
A Marshalltown Municipal Transit bus on Anson Street.

== History ==
Public transit in Marshalltown began with horsecars in 1878, with the Marshalltown Street Railway Co. From 1892 to 1893, the horsecars were replaced with streetcars, which in turn were replaced by buses in 1929. In 2020, fares were temporarily suspended due to the COVID-19 pandemic. Later that year, the agency offered free rides to polling places for election day. Due to staffing shortages, two of the seasonal routes have been temporarily suspended beginning July 5, 2023.

== Routes ==
Marshalltown Municipal Transit operates 5 regular weekday bus routes on a pulse system with all routes serving the Fisher Community Center either on the hour or half hour. These five routes are augmented by two AM Routes, which only make two runs in the morning. In addition, there are four seasonal routes, three of which make one run per day from August to June, while one additional route runs June to August.

Hours of operation for the system are Monday through Friday from 7:15 A.M. to 6:00 P.M. There is no service on Saturdays and Sundays. Regular fares are $1.00.

=== Regular Routes ===
- Red Route
- Orange Route
- Blue Route
- Green Route
- Purple Route
- North A.M. Route
- South A.M. Route

=== Seasonal Routes ===
- Grey Route
- Yellow Route
- Brown Route
- Pink Route

== Fleet ==
Marshalltown Municipal Transit operates 10 buses in its fixed-route fleet. The fleet consists of five 29 foot Gillig Low Floor transit buses, a Chevrolet/Glaval G4500 Titan II LF cutaway bus, and a handful of second-hand and third-hand 40 foot Gillig transit buses formerly operated by CyRide. The current fixed-route fleet is listed in the table below.

Fleet number(s)	Photo	Year	Manufacturer	Model	Powertrain	Transmission	Notes
011, 013		2001	Gillig	Phantom 40'	Cummins ISM	Voith D864.3E	Ex-CyRide; Exx-Metro Transit (Minnesota)
014		2001	Gillig	Low Floor 40'	Cummins ISM	Voith D864.3E	Ex-CyRide; Exx-DART
101		2010	Gillig	Low Floor 29'	Cummins ISL9	Allison B400R	
109		2009	Gillig	Low Floor 29'	Cummins ISL	Allison B400R	
121		2012	Gillig	Low Floor 29'	Cummins ISL9	Allison B400R	
131		2013	Gillig	Low Floor 29'	Cummins ISL9	Allison B400R	
181		2018	Gillig	Low Floor 29'	Cummins L9	Allison B400R	
191		2019	Chevrolet/ Glaval	G4500/ Titan II LF			
991		1999	Gillig	Low Floor 40'	Cummins ISC	Allison B400R	Ex-CyRide

== Fixed route ridership ==
The ridership statistics shown here are of fixed route services only and do not include demand response services.

== See also ==
- List of bus transit systems in the United States
- CyRide
