= Allen Biehler =

American engineer and civil servant

- Born: Allen D. Biehler; Rochester, New York
- Education: Bachelor of Science in Civil Engineering, University of Pittsburgh, 1967; Certificate in Highway Transportation, Yale University, 1968
- Occupations: Engineer and civil servant
- Known for: Secretary of the Pennsylvania Department of Transportation, 2003-2011

Allen D. Biehler was Secretary of the Pennsylvania Department of Transportation, a position he held between 2003 and 2011. Barry Schoch was designated as his successor by Governor Tom Corbett.

== Family and education ==
Born in Rochester, New York, Biehler and his wife, Diane, were longtime residents of Crafton, Pennsylvania prior to his appointment as Secretary of the Pennsylvania Department of Transportation in 2003.

He received his B.S. in Civil Engineering at the University of Pittsburgh and his Certificate in Highway Transportation at Yale University.

== Career ==
From 1996 to 1997, Biehler served as interim CEO of the Port Authority of Allegheny County.

After his tenure as Secretary of the Pennsylvania Department of Transportation, Biehler was appointed as a Distinguished Service Professor of Transportation Systems and Policy at the Heinz College at Carnegie Mellon University and as Executive Director of CMU's University Transportation Center.

He is also an adjunct professor in the Civil and Environmental Engineering Department at Carnegie Mellon University.

== Legacy ==
As Secretary of the Pennsylvania Department Transportation for eight years, Biehler was an advocate for highway funding, which led to him becoming head of an organization that was in charge of highway systems, and enabled him to administer "one of the nation’s largest grant programs for mass transit, rail freight, and aviation."

He also developed and named a program named "Smart Transportation", which:

- streamlined and stabilized the Commonwealth's transit program
- accelerated PennDOT's highway project delivery processes
- ensured that highway projects became assets for the surrounding community.

== Awards ==
- Distinguished Alumnus Award, University of Pittsburgh Civil and Environmental Engineering, 1997.
- William Metcalf Award for Outstanding Engineering Achievement, Engineers Society of Western Pennsylvania, 2004.
- Transportation Person of the Year, The Traffic Club of Philadelphia, 2009.
- Friend of Pennsylvania Award, 10,000 Friends of Pennsylvania, 2010.
- Service to Humanity Award, March of Dimes of Pennsylvania, 2010.
- Bachelor of Science degree in Civil Engineering, University of Pittsburgh, Pittsburgh, PA 1967 and a Certificate in Highway Transportation (Masters equivalent), Yale University, New Haven CT 1968

Preceded by William Millar	Port Authority of Allegheny County CEO; 1996 – 1997	Succeeded by Paul Skoutelas
