= CyRide =

Transit authority of Ames, Iowa, operated by Iowa State University

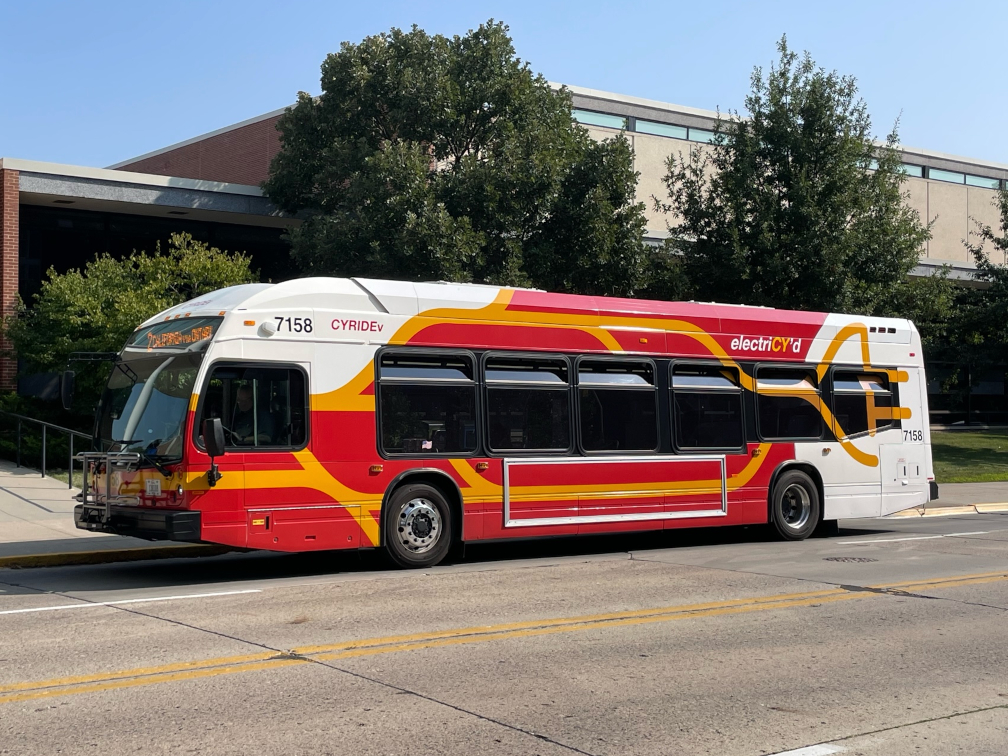
- CyRide #7158, a 2022 Nova Bus LFSe+ electric bus
- Founded: 1976
- Headquarters: 601 N. University Boulevard; Ames, IA 50014
- Service area: Ames, Iowa; Iowa State University
- Service type: Bus service
- Routes: 14
- Stops: 362
- Fleet: 90 (82 buses and 8 cutaways)
- Daily ridership: 12,919 (FY2024)
- Annual ridership: 4.72 million (FY2024)
- Fuel type: Diesel, Hybrid, Electric, Gasoline
- Website: cyride.com

CyRide is the public transit operator in Ames, Iowa, serving Iowa State University. CyRide services are operated by the city of Ames in partnership with the university, serving the university community and the general public. CyRide's namesake is Cy the Cardinal, the mascot of the Iowa State Cyclones athletic teams.

In 2024, CyRide provided over 4.7 million rides, making it the most-used public transit system in the state of Iowa. Additionally, CyRide consistently ranks as one of the most productive transit agencies in the United States, as measured by annual passenger trips per resident in its service area.

CyRide was founded in 1976 as a department of the city of Ames. Service to the Iowa State University campus began in 1979, and the Ames Transit Agency was established in 1981 as a permanent governing body for the service. Fares were made free for Iowa State University students in 2002. CyRide services are funded by Iowa State University student fees and local, state, and federal tax funds.

== History ==
From the 1860s until the early 1890 college students were taxied to and from campus by a horse-drawn carriage that was operated by brothers, Nichols and Maxwell Livery. The town committee published a report on November 1, 1890 stating that there would be a benefit to create a railroad to replace the current system.

On July 4, 1892, the rail line, named the Dinkey (in reference to the size of the engine) departed from its barn on the East end of 5th Street, for its first 2-mile (3.2 km) trip to the Iowa State University campus. The Dinkey ran on 30 lb/yd (15 kg/m) rail; that is small compared to the 136 lb/yd (67 kg/m) rail that is used today. The Dinkey had three passenger cars that were often at maximum capacity because of the growing population of the city.

In 1929, the Dinkey was replaced by a bus system that transported passengers to and from the Iowa State University. In 1976 all operating buses were combined and CyRide was started as a city department.

In 1981 Bob Bourne was hired as the director of CyRide. He brought CyRide from a 12-bus, 3-route system to a 65-bus, 11-route system in his 25 years of employment at CyRide.

CyRide has considered a "fare-free" system for all Ames residents. In 2008, CyRide received 270,000 dollars from paid fares, a small part of the annual revenue. This option was not pursued; fares are collected in 2023. Operating revenues are from many sources, the most significant being the Government of the Student Body of Iowa State University and the university itself. Other sources include the city of Ames and Iowa DOT, and the Federal Transit Administration (FTA). Fares are a small share of total annual revenues, about 2%, and continue to be collected.

In 2009 CyRide was one of 42 applicants to receive a TIGER grant through the Federal Transit Administration. This allowed them to purchase 12 new hybrid buses at a cost of $6 million. The buses—dubbed 'Cybrids'—have an estimated 6 mpg. The fleet previously averaged about 4.5 mpg fuel efficiency.

In 2019, Ames ranked third in the US for transit rides per capita, a measure of the importance of the service to the city, and of the high quality of service delivered. “Entering the new decade, CyRide ranked third in the nation in ridership per capita, standing at 110.2 rides per capita, trailing only New York’s Metropolitan Transportation Authority and San Francisco’s Municipal Transportation Agency.” The anticipated decline in ridership in early 2020 reflects ISU’s expectation of a decline in student enrollment over the next five or ten years. Students are a major part of the ridership. CyRide gains extra financial support from FTA based on its high quality of operation and service as shown in specific service quality measures.

== Routes ==
Route number	Route	Starting Terminal	Ending Terminal	Major Streets traveled
1	Red West	North Grand Mall	Ames Middle School	Mortensen Rd, Lincoln Way, Duff Ave
1	Red East	Ames Middle School	North Grand Mall	Mortensen Rd, Lincoln Way, Duff Ave
2	Green West	North Grand Mall	Ontario St & California Ave	Ontario St, Hyland Ave, 6th St, Grand Ave
2	Green East	Ontario St & California Ave	North Grand Mall	Ontario St, Hyland Ave, 6th St, Grand Ave
3	Blue Campus	S. 5th St	Bessey Hall	S. 4th St, Beach Ave, Lincoln Way, Osborn Dr
3	Blue S. 5th St	Bessey Hall	S. 5th St	S. 4th St, Beach Ave, Lincoln Way, Osborn Dr
5	Yellow	City Hall	City Hall	South Duff Ave, Lincoln Way
6	Brown South	North Grand Mall	ISU Research Park	Bloomington Rd, Stange Rd, University Blvd; Mortensen Pkwy, Osborn Dr
6	Brown North	ISU Research Park	North Grand Mall	Bloomington Rd, Stange Rd, University Blvd; Mortensen Pkwy, Osborn Dr
7	Purple Student Services	Alcott Ave	Student Services	Todd Dr, Lincoln Way, Union Dr
7	Purple Alcott	Student Services	Alcott Ave	Todd Dr, Lincoln Way, Union Dr
8	Aqua (Summer only)	City Hall	City Hall	Grand Ave, 13th St, Furman Aquatic Center
9	Plum Campus	Buckeye and S. 16th	Kildee Hall	S. 16th St, S. Duff Ave, Lincoln Way, Osborn Dr
9	Plum Buckeye	Kildee Hall	Buckeye and S. 16th	S. 16th St, S. Duff Ave, Lincoln Way, Osborn Dr
11	Cherry West	Student Services	West Mortensen Rd	Union Dr, Lincoln Way, South Dakota Ave, Mortensen Rd
11	Cherry East	West Mortensen Rd	Student Services	Union Dr, Lincoln Way, South Dakota Ave, Mortensen Rd
12	Lilac West	Student Services	Dickenson Ave	Union Dr, State Ave, Mortensen Rd
12	Lilac East	Dickenson Ave	Student Services	Union Dr, State Ave, Mortensen Rd
14	Peach South	North Grand Mall	Kildee Hall	24th St, Stange Rd, Osborn Dr
14	Peach North	Kildee Hall	North Grand Mall	24th St, Stange Rd, Osborn Dr
21	Cardinal	Frederiksen Court	Frederiksen Court	Stange Rd, Osborn Dr, Union Dr
23	Orange	Iowa State Center	Iowa State Center	Beach Ave, Osborn Dr, Union Dr
25	Gold North	Towers	40 Schilletter	Welch Ave, Osborn Dr, Stange Rd
25	Gold South	40 Schilletter	Towers	Welch Ave, Osborn Dr, Stange Rd
EASE	East Ames Service Extension	City Hall	City Hall	East Lincoln Way, Dayton Ave, E. 13th St

== Fares ==
Iowa State students

An ISU Card allows students to board any bus for free.

Undergraduate students of Iowa State University are able to ride CyRide without paying the normal fare by presenting the bus driver with their Iowa State identification card. This is necessary on all bus routes except the 21 Cardinal, 23 Orange and 25 Gold Routes which always allow passengers to travel without charge. Iowa State University charges a fee each semester to all undergraduate students for CyRide service. This student fee is paid to CyRide to subsidize the cost of operations.

Reduced fare riders

To qualify for reduced fare, riders must be a student in grades K-12, a senior citizen, or a person with a disability. The reduced Fare is US$0.50 for a one way trip. Multiple tickets can be purchased at a time, if a ticket book is purchased in advance. Reduced fare ticket books come in a packet of 10 which cost US$5. Ticket books can be bought at local grocery stores, Ames City Hall, and CyRide headquarters.

Full fare riders

Full fare riders covers everyone else who is riding. The regular fare is US$1.00. Full fare riders can also purchase multiple tickets in advance. Ticket books come in a packet of 10 which cost US$10. Ticket books can also be bought at local grocery stores, Ames City Hall, and CyRide headquarters.

Children under five

Children under the age of five are free with an accompanying adult. There may be no more than three children per adult.

== Additional services ==
=== Moonlight Express ===
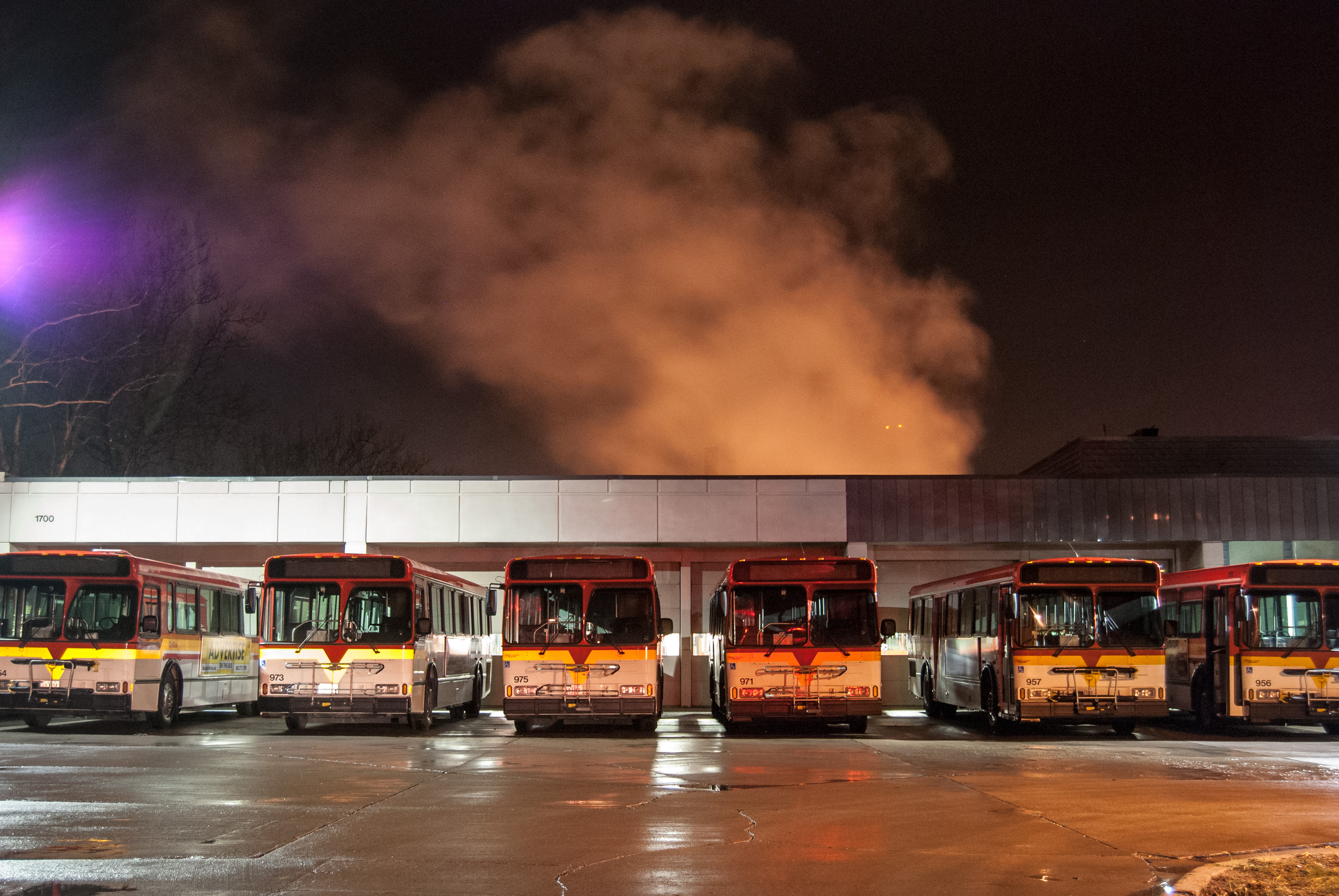
Buses preparing to depart for Moonlight Express

In 1984, Cyride started to operate a Friday and Saturday nights service called NightRide. The service was inadequately funded, leading to its cancellation in 1992. It returned as Moonlight Express in 1993, and has been dubbed "the drunk bus" by students. Operating between 10:30 pm and 2:30 am, Moonlight Express replaces regular night service, instead offering door-to-door rides upon request and optimized fixed-route service.

In the time Moonlight Express has been running, there have been no drunk-driving fatalities in Ames during its hours of operation.

=== Dial-A-Ride ===
Dial-A-Ride is a door-to-door service that caters mostly to elderly and disabled persons. This service take people within ¾ mile from any fixed Cyride route. A Dial-A-Ride rides need to be scheduled the day before to ensure a spot. In 2005 Dial-A-Ride was turned over to the Heart of Iowa Regional Transit Authority (HIRTA) which is operated out of the Heartland Senior Services site in the Ames area.

== Fleet ==
CyRide currently operates a variety of different transit buses. Much of CyRide's fleet consists of 40-foot buses but there are several 62-foot articulated buses used in high-capacity service and several small buses used for lower-capacity services. The majority of CyRide's 40-foot bus fleet is manufactured by Gillig while the remaining 40-foot bus fleet is manufactured by Orion Bus Industries. CyRide maintained a few GM New Look 40-foot buses for training purposes but none currently remain on the active fleet list. The 62-foot articulated buses (as well as two 40-foot electric buses) are manufactured by Nova Bus. Much of the current CyRide fleet can be referenced in the table below.

Manufacturer	Model	Fleet number(s)	Photo	Model Year	Notes
Gillig	Low Floor 40'	105-110		2012	
Gillig	Low Floor 40'	126-128		2010	
Gillig	Low Floor 40'	180-184		2012	
Gillig	Low Floor 40'	186-189 (formerly 0819-0822)		2008	
Gillig	Low Floor 40'	1111-1116		2015	
Gillig	Low Floor 40'	1136-1139		2018-19	
Gillig	Low Floor 40'	1142-1144		2020	
Gillig	Low Floor 40'	1145-1148		2022	
Gillig	Low Floor 40'	1163-1170		2023	
Gillig	Low Floor 40'	1182-1183		2026	
Gillig	Low Floor HEV 40'	418-425, 429-432 (formerly 118-125, 129-132)		2010	Nicknamed "Cybrids".; Delivered in July 2010.; 423 is retired.
Gillig	Low Floor Plus EV 40'	7173-7177		2025	
Orion Bus Industries	Orion VII	501-504 (formerly 1-4)		2006	501 is retired.
Orion Bus Industries	Orion V	9070-9077 (formerly 970-977)		2002	9071 and 9077 are retired.
Nova Bus	LFS Artic	660-661		2012	Delivered in February 2013.
Nova Bus	LFS Artic	6101-6104		2016	
Nova Bus	LFS Artic	6149-6150		2021-22	
Nova Bus	LFSe+	7157-7158		2022	First electric buses in CyRide fleet.
New Flyer Industries	XD60	6178-6179		2026	
Ford	E-450	3151-3156		2021	
Ram New England Wheels	ProMaster Frontrunner; LFXLT	3161-3162		2024	

== Awards ==
- 2018 State Bus Roadeo Winner in small bus division
- 2017 State Bus Roadeo Winners in both large and small bus divisions
- 26 State Bus Roadeo Winners (as of June 2016)
- 2015 State Bus Roadeo Winner in large bus division
- 5th place in the 35' bus division at the 2007 APTA International Bus Roadeo
- 2nd place in the 35' bus division at the 2004 APTA International Bus Roadeo
- 2002 APTA Gold Safety Award Finalist
- 1999 APTA Neil E. Goldschmidt Silver Safety Award Finalist
- 1997 APTA Neil E. Goldschmidt Silver Safety Award Winner
- 1996 APTA AdWheels Award Winner
- 1995 APTA Neil E. Goldschmidt Silver Safety Award Winner
- 1993 APTA Neil E. Goldschmidt Silver Safety Award Finalist
- 1992 Public Risk Management Administration Achievement Award
- 1991 APTA Neil E. Goldschmidt Silver Safety Award Finalist
- 1989 UMTA Outstanding Public Service Award
- 1989 UMTA Administrator's Award
- 1983 All America City Award

== Fixed route ridership ==
The ridership and service statistics shown here are of fixed route services only and do not include demand response. Per capita statistics are based on the Ames urbanized area as reported in NTD data. Starting in 2011, 2010 census numbers replace the 2000 census numbers to calculate per capita statistics.

	Ridership	Change	Ridership per capita
2003	4,848,494	n/a	95.58
2004	4,529,451	▼6.58%	89.29
2005	4,177,180	▼7.78%	82.35
2006	4,224,428	▲1.13%	83.28
2007	4,471,336	▲5.84%	88.15
2008	4,737,992	▲5.96%	93.4
2009	5,258,530	▲10.99%	103.67
2010	5,348,981	▲1.72%	105.45
2011	5,587,101	▲4.45%	92.44
2012	5,774,124	▲3.35%	95.54
2013	6,250,952	▲8.26%	103.43
2014	6,777,675	▲8.43%	112.14
2015	6,704,537	▼1.08%	110.93
2016	6,708,382	▲0.0%	111
2017	6,453,494	▼3.8%	106.78
2018	6,194,467	▼4.01%	102.49
2019	5,704,328	▼7.91%	94.38
2020	2,534,349	▼55.57%	38.2
2021	2,792,048	▲10.17%	51.28
2022	3,669,894	▲31.44%	67.41
2023	4,142,196	▲12.87%	76.08
2024	4,715,514	▲13.84%	86.61

== See also ==
- List of bus transit systems in the United States
