= Dennis Veraldi =

Dennis Veraldi was the interim CEO of the Port Authority of Allegheny County serving metropolitan Pittsburgh, Pennsylvania from September 13, 2005, until June 11, 2006. He was formerly the longtime CEO of Pittsburgh-based Eckert Seamans lawfirm.

Preceded by Paul Skoutelas	Port Authority of Allegheny County CEO; 2005 – 2006	Succeeded by Stephen Bland
