= International Bus Roadeo =

Bus driving and maintenance competition

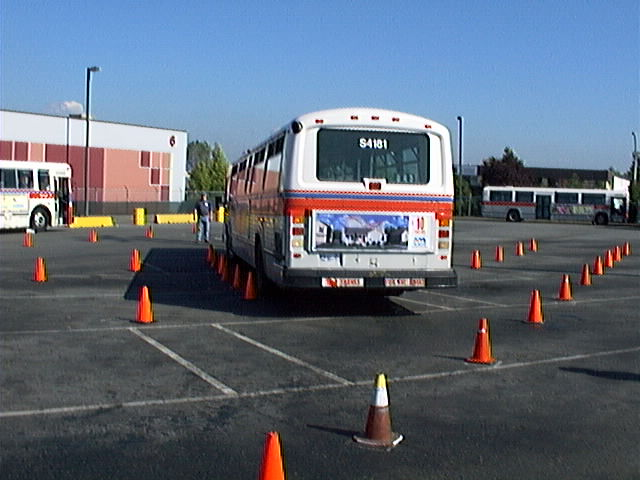
A bus participating in the 1998 Regional Bus Roadeo in Vancouver, British Columbia.

The International Bus Roadeo is an annual bus driving and bus maintenance competition, or roadeo, hosted by the American Public Transportation Association. A grand prize is given to the bus transit system with the highest composite bus operation and bus maintenance score. The bus driving competition consists of an obstacle course. For the bus maintenance competition, teams of mechanics must locate and fix defects in a number of bus power trains and other systems.

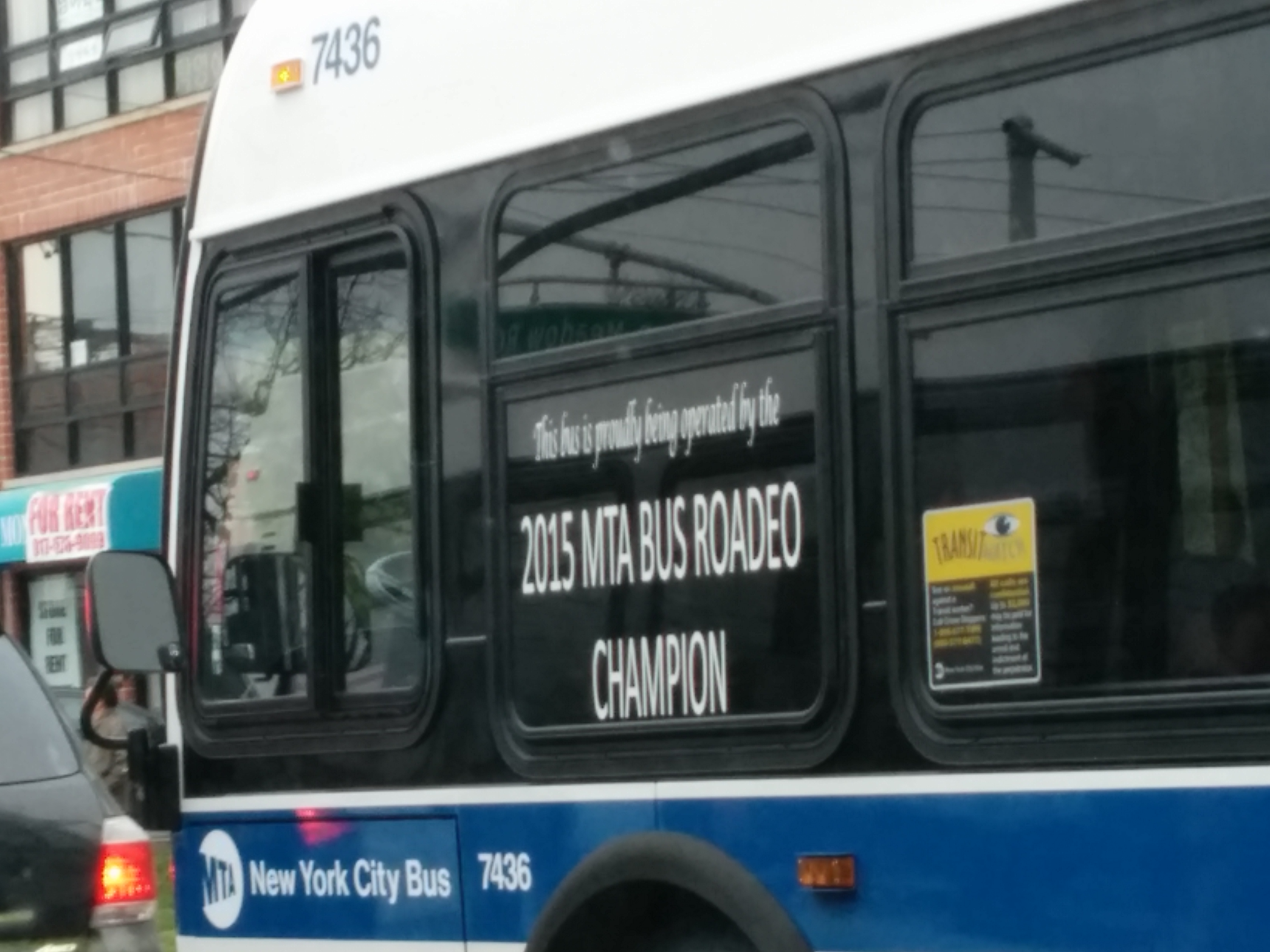
A decal announcing the fact that a bus is being operated by the winner of the 2015 MTA Bus Roadeo.

The International Bus Roadeo is the final competition in a system of qualifying roadeos held at the regional, state, and district levels. Bus operators from across North American are represented at the roadeo. For instance, the Corpus Christi Regional Transit Authority Roadeo winners go on to a state competition in Waco. The winners of each regional or state roadeo go on to represent their region at the international roadeo.

The 2016 International Bus Roadeo was held in Charlotte, North Carolina in May.

== History ==
The name "roadeo" is derived from the rodeo competition. The original roadeos, which began in 1937, featured trucks in various categories going through the same obstacles that the bus drivers go through in the current roadeo.

A bus operator for Minneapolis-St. Paul Metropolitan Transit Commission (MTC) designed the structure of the bus roadeo as it is known today. MTC held a local bus roadeo in September 1975 with over 80 participants. After word spread, other transportation agencies across the country reached out for guidance about developing their own competitions, leading to the creation of a guidebook and a national organizing committee. The first International Bus Roadeo was held in 1976 in San Francisco. Regional competitions below the international one have been held since at least 1982.

== Competition ==
Each transit system is allowed to compete in the bus operation competition (the "operators' roadeo"), the bus maintenance competition (the "technicians' roadeo"), or both.

=== Pre-trip inspection ===
On the day before the competition, the bus operators are required to inspect an inspection bus and find eight planted mechanical defects, as well as one planted security-related defect. The mechanical defects can appear in areas such as flooring and seats; the security-related defect may consist of an "abandoned" briefcase or package.

=== Bus operation ===
Bus operators must drive their buses through a course containing various obstacles while under a strict time limit:

- In the serpentine, the bus must be driven in and out of three cones spaced closer together than the length of the bus.
- In the offset street, the bus must complete a simulated "lane change".
- In the rear duals clearance, the bus must carefully drive through a narrowing lane that is only three inches wider than the bus at its end.
- In the right hand turn, the bus must turn right while the near rear tire of the bus passes within six inches of the corner.
- In the customer stop, the bus must stop within inches of a simulated curb.
- In the reverse, the bus must reverse with the rear bumper coming within three feet of a cone behind the bus.
- In the left hand turn, the bus must turn left without hitting any cones placed close to the bus's path.
- In the diminishing clearance obstacle, the clear audience favorite during at least one regional, the bus must maintain a minimum speed while driving through a narrowing path outlined by cones.
- In the judgment stop, which is the last obstacle in the course, the bus must stop less than six inches from a cone placed on the finish line.

As drivers negotiate the obstacle course, their buses are equipped with a device that generates a "smoothness of operation" score. Awards are given in the thirty-five-foot bus and forty-foot-bus categories.

=== Bus maintenance ===
Bus maintenance teams usually consist of three employees from a transit system. In the technicians' roadeo, technicians must diagnose and repair various mechanical issues with buses. The roadeo consists of a number of portions:

- A written test, with questions on topics such as HVAC, transmission, and brakes;
- A vehicle inspection of a bus with 14 planted defects;
- Two power train events involving inspection of a bus power train with seven planted defects, and correction of a single defect that prevents correct operation of the power train;
- One air brake system event involving inspection of an air brake system with six planted defects;
- One HVAC event involving inspection of a HVAC system with a single planted defect;
- One electrical control system event; and
- One vapor door event, involving inspection of a half-height air door system mockup with seven planted defects.
