= Friends of Garrity Creek =

The Friends of Garrity Creek (FGC) is a political organization in Contra Costa County, California which promote the preservation of Garrity Creek.

== Overview ==
The Friends was formed in 2001 when development on steep slopes near the creek's artesian spring source threatened its existence and quality. The friends were eventually successful in preventing the later determined illegal development which was in violation of grade limits for steepness.

The FGC fund-raise money and work to create awareness of the watershed and its importance to the area. The creek passes through Hilltop Green, under Interstate 80 via pipes, down a small canyon alongside Hilltop Plaza Shopping Center, and then through culverts to a gorge where it has been dammed to create Hilltop Lake. At that point the creek appears as a small lake, surrounded by Hilltop Lake Park. The creek then continues through undeveloped land to its mouth at the shoreline of San Pablo Bay. The friends occasionally have organized volunteer events to clean up trash and to remove invasive species.

== See also ==
- Friends of the Five Creeks
