= Hercules station =

Proposed railway station and ferry terminal in Hercules, California

Hercules, CA
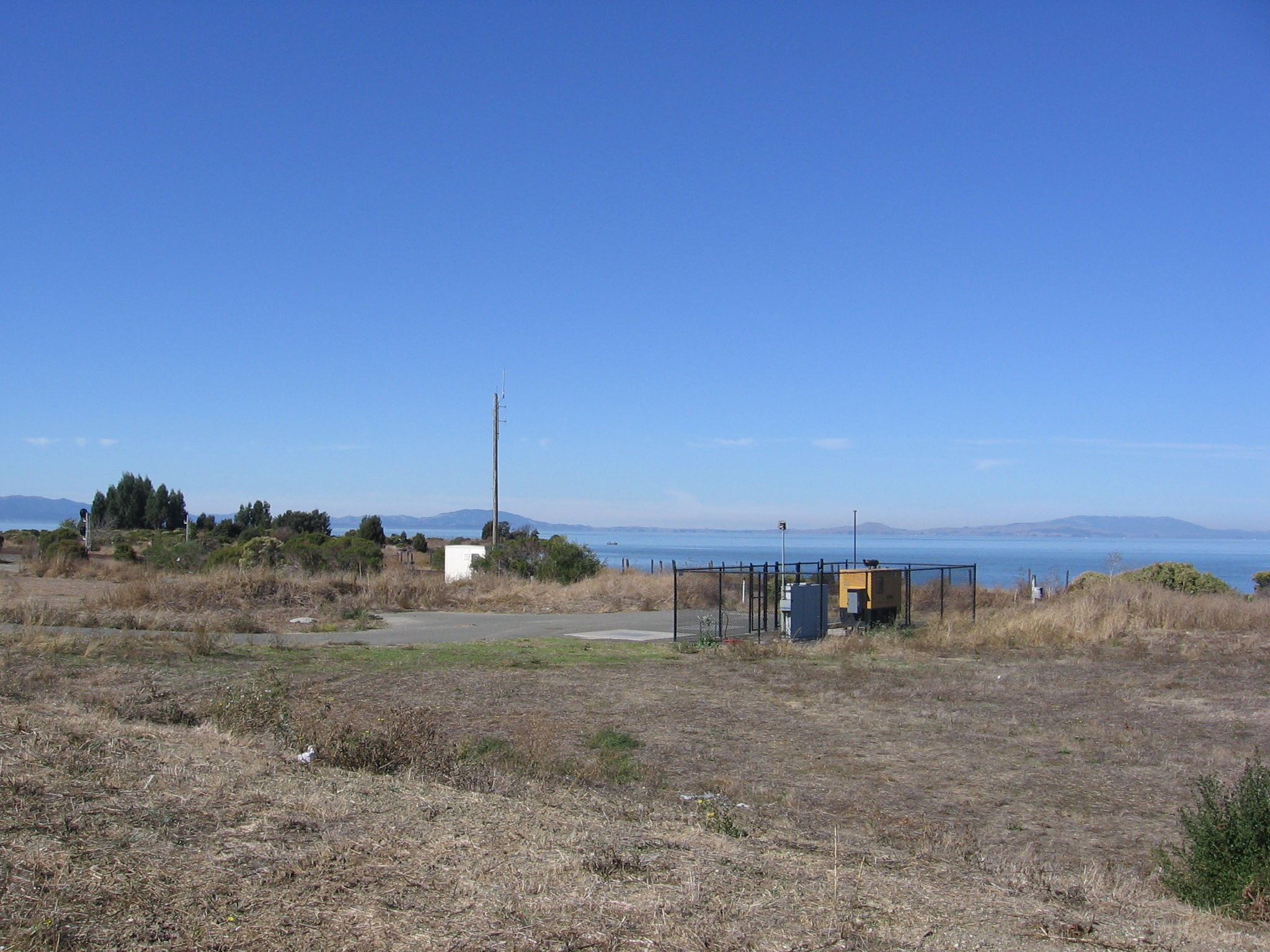
- The proposed station site in October 2012

General information
- Location: Bayfront Boulevard & Railroad Avenue, Hercules, California
- Coordinates: 38°01′13″N 122°17′13″W
- Owner: City of Hercules
- Operator: WETA & CCJPA
- Line: UP Martinez Subdivision
- Platforms: 1 island platform
- Tracks: 2
- Connections: WestCat; San Francisco Bay Ferry

Construction
- Parking: Garage (proposed)
- Cycle facilities: yes
- Accessible: yes

Other information
- Status: In planning
- Station code: HRC

Former services
Preceding station	Southern Pacific Railroad	Following station
Pinole toward Oakland Pier	Overland Route	Rodeo toward Ogden

Proposed services
Preceding station	Amtrak	Following station
Richmond toward San Jose	Capitol Corridor	Martinez toward Auburn
Richmond toward Oakland	Gold Runner	Martinez toward Bakersfield
Location

Hercules station (officially the Hercules Regional Intermodal Transit Center) is a proposed intermodal infill train station and ferry terminal in Hercules, California in Contra Costa County. It is to be the first direct Amtrak-to-ferry transit hub in the San Francisco Bay Area and will be constructed in between the existing Richmond and Martinez stations. By July 2018, three of the station's six construction phases had been complete, including street at Bay Trail approaches. However, no proposed opening date has yet been announced by the City of Hercules.

== Overview ==
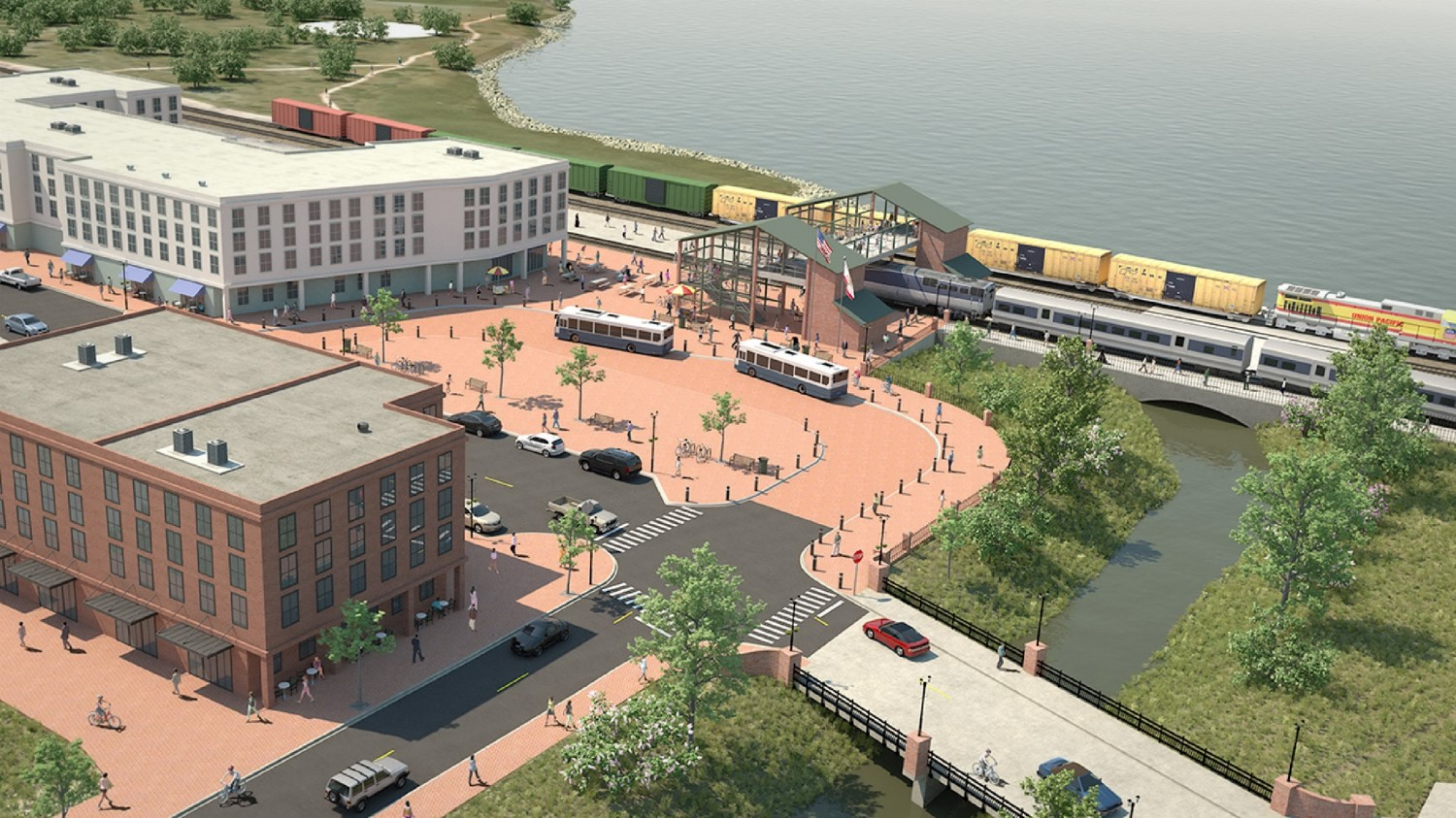
A rendering of the planned station, released by the city in 2018

The station site at Hercules Point, adjacent to Bayfront Boulevard in Hercules, is the subject of a redevelopment effort of the city of Hercules as an office, residential Transit-oriented development (TOD), and intermodal transit hub with a corresponding WestCat bus station and Water Transit Authority ferry terminal. The buses would provide feeder service from the surrounding communities of Pinole, Rodeo, El Sobrante, Crockett, Tara Hills, and Richmond.

=== Rail ===
The station will also host a future Amtrak station. The Capitol Corridor Joint Powers Authority granted the station candidate status in February 2020. The governing body of San Joaquin services are studying adding Hercules as an additional stop as of 2020.

=== Ferry ===
The ferry will take approximately 42 minutes to San Francisco. Ridership was projected at 1,022 passengers per day by the year 2025. The route will run between this terminal and the San Francisco Ferry Building where passengers may walk, bike or take Muni or BART to nearby job centers in the city's downtown Financial District.

=== Transit village ===
A bike and pedestrian friendly community will be built up around the hub to connect it to existing housing in the nearby Refugio and Central neighborhoods. It will feature 220 live/work dwellings in addition to 490,000 square feet (46,000 m^{2}) of office, retail (including restaurants and cafes), and public space.

=== Funding ===
The funding for this project is being coordinated by partnerships and cooperation between the Capitol Corridor Joint Powers Authority, the City of Hercules, and WETA. Funds will be collected from various sources including the Federal Ferryboat Discretionary Fund, Contra Costa County Measure J Sales Tax, Transit Impact Fees, and farebox revenue.

The WETA report indicates that "construction costs for the project are substantially higher compared to other projects due to large mudflats requiring extensive pier and dredging work to access the site."

An additional $30.8M state grant was announced in April, 2023.

== See also ==
- Hercules Transit Center — major local bus hub
