= Hilltop Lake =

Lake in the state of California, United States

- Location within California Location within the United States
- Location: Hilltop, Richmond, California
- Coordinates: 37.986°N 122.328°W
- Type: Lake
- Primary inflows: Garrity Creek
- Primary outflows: Garrity Creek
- Basin countries: United States
- Settlements: Richmond

Hilltop Lake is a lagoon in Richmond, California.

== Overview ==
The lake is fed by Garrity Creek, a small river originating from many springs in the hills east of the Hilltop Green neighborhood in the Hilltop neighborhood. The pond is located within Hilltop Lake Park and is very close to Hilltop Mall. The lake is in the middle of the flow of the creek and the water flows to the marshlands and shoreline of San Pablo Bay. The water body is sometimes confused with Temporary Pond; however, this lagoon lies to the northwest and is fed by a different watershed entirely.

== See also ==
- List of lakes in California
- List of lakes in the San Francisco Bay Area
