= Hercules Transit Center =

Bus station in Hercules, California, United States

Coordinates: 38°00′46″N 122°15′55″W

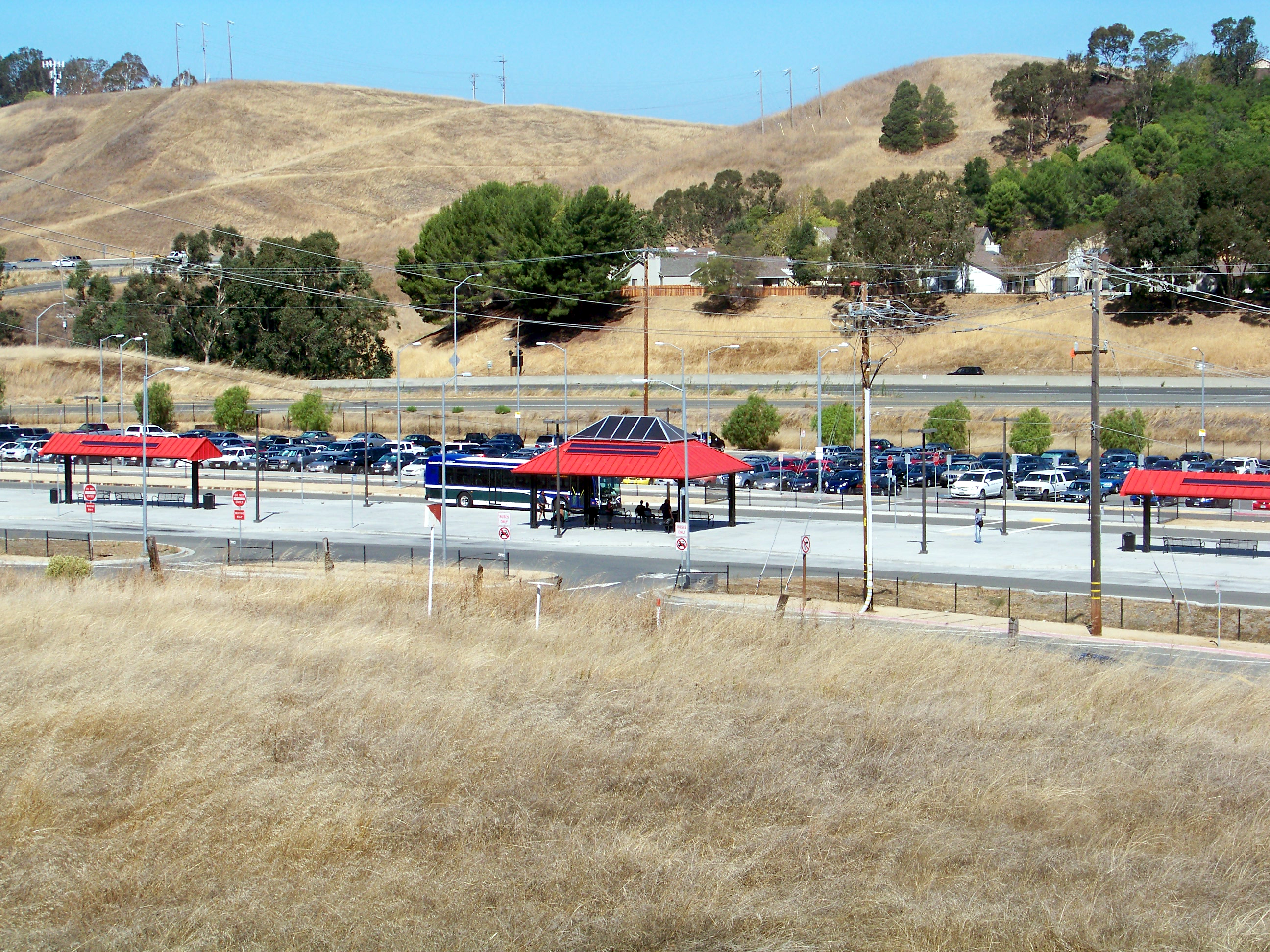
- Hercules Transit Center

General information
- Location: Hercules, California; United States
- Owner: WestCAT
- Connections: WestCAT (local and express), transfers to AC Transit

Construction
- Parking: Paid parking ($3/day)

Other information
- Website: herculestransitcenter.com

History
- Opened: Originally on San Pablo Avenue; relocated August 2009

Services
WestCAT local & transbay buses
Location

Hercules Transit Center is a major commuter hub in the western Contra Costa County city of Hercules, California. It is anchored by WestCAT bus services. The center was originally on San Pablo Avenue. In August 2009, the transit center was relocated to the other side of I-80 with additional paid parking, which is $3/day.

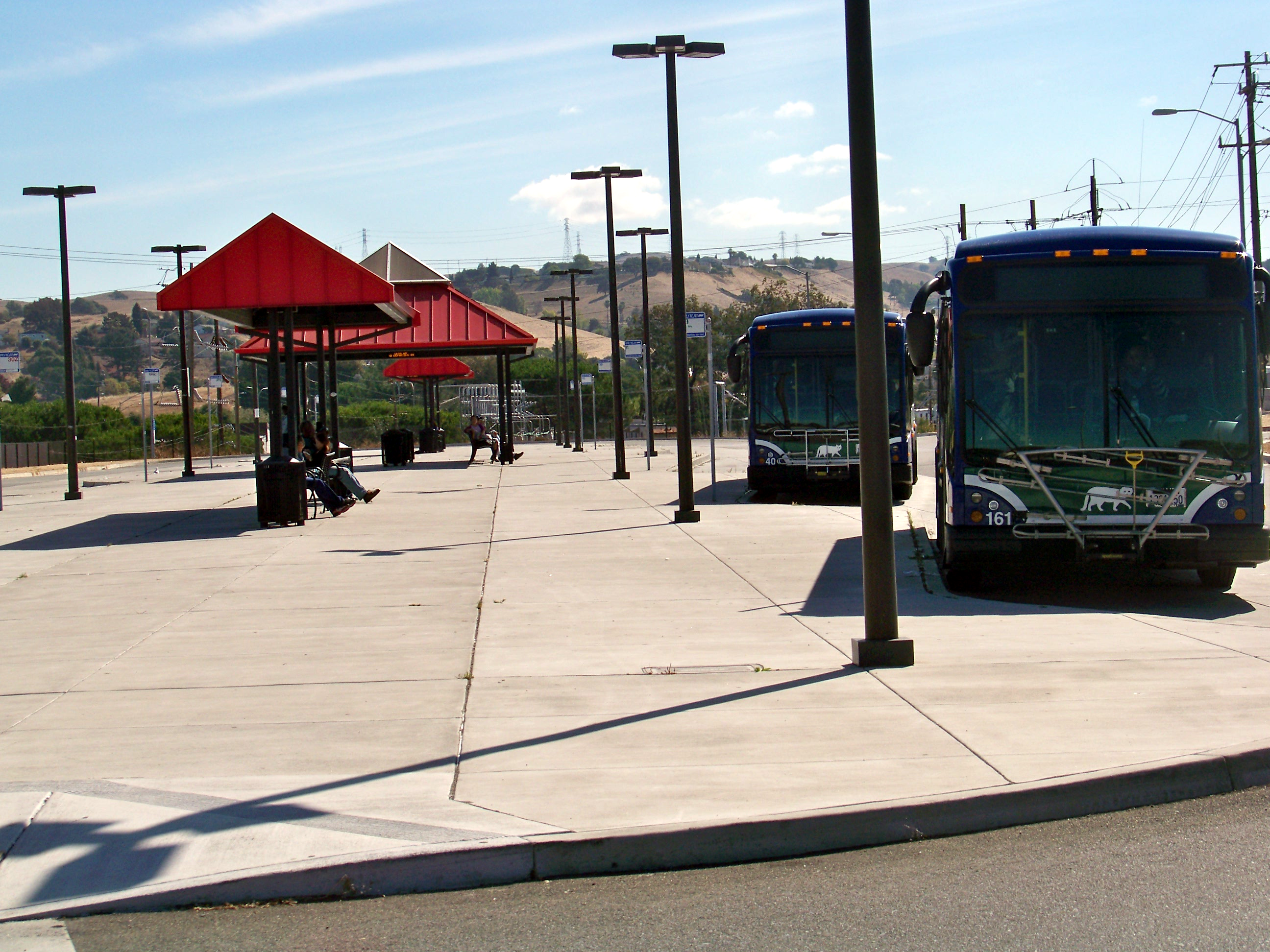

The transit center is a pulse (a timed and synchronized) transfer point for various local feeder bus lines from the adjacent areas of Hercules, Pinole, Rodeo, the northern Hilltop area of Richmond, Bayview-Montalvin, and Tara Hills.

The feeder services direct express commuter bus service to El Cerrito del Norte BART station in El Cerrito, downtown Martinez (the county seat) and the Martinez Amtrak station. These services provide transfers to AC Transit at Richmond Parkway Transit Center, shopping areas at Hilltop Mall Shopping Center and Pinole Vista Shopping Center and weekday transbay service to the San Francisco Transbay Terminal.

The westbound weekday morning commute from this point south towards the San Francisco–Oakland Bay Bridge is the most congested in the San Francisco Bay Area since 2001 according to Caltrans.

Studies have been concluded as to the feasibility of extending BART service to the Transit Center. A larger, proposed Hercules Regional Intermodal Transit Center has been planned for the corner of Bayfront Boulevard and Railroad Avenue, though it would not necessarily discontinue the use of this facility.

== Bus service ==
The following weekday bus lines stop at the center:

=== WestCAT ===
- 10 Gems and Birds: Hercules
- 11 Crockett/Rodeo: Crockett via Rodeo
- 12 Trees and Flowers: Hercules
- 15 Viewpointe: Rodeo
- 19 Hilltop/Hercules: Hilltop Mall (Saturday service only)
- 30Z Martinez Link: Martinez Station
- C3 Contra Costa College
- Dial-a-ride General public dial-a-ride and paratransit service
- J Hercules/BART: El Cerrito del Norte Station
- JPX Hercules/BART: El Cerrito del Norte Station via Pinole Valley Road
- JX Hercules/BART: El Cerrito del Norte Station Non-Stop Express
- Lynx: San Francisco Transbay Terminal
