= Oakley station (California) =

Planned train station in Oakley, California, US

Oakley, CA

General information
- Location: Main Street near 2nd Street; Oakley, California; United States
- Coordinates: 37.998362°N 121.713568°W
- Line: BNSF Stockton Subdivision
- Platforms: 1 side platform
- Tracks: 2

Construction
- Parking: 300 spaces
- Accessible: Yes

History
- Opening: Fall 2027

Services
Preceding station	Amtrak	Following station
Martinez toward Oakland	Gold Runner	Stockton–San Joaquin Street toward Bakersfield
Location

Oakley station is a planned Amtrak California Gold Runner station in Oakley, located near Main Street between O'Hara Avenue and Second Street. Oakley station is expected to replace the Antioch–Pittsburg station. The project was partially funded by a 2018 grant from California's Transit and Intercity Rail Capital Program.

The station was originally expected to open in 2022, but the project was subsequently delayed. As of August 2026, an invitation for bids was expected in summer 2026, with construction scheduled to begin in winter 2026–27 and the station expected to open in fall 2027.
