= Hilltop Green, Richmond, California =

Coordinates: 37.98057°N 122.312851°W

Hilltop Green or "The Green"is a neighborhood in Richmond, California bordering the city of Pinole, the census-designated place of El Sobrante, the neighborhood of Hilltop, and Hilltop Mall.

== History ==
Hilltop Green has its own neighborhood council and community center in its centrally located self-titled park. The area has one entrance and exit to Hilltop Drive and AC Transit commuter bus service to San Francisco. Local bus service was eliminated in 2007. The green was originally one of the first racially integrated suburban developments created in the Bay Area and the nation and it maintains this diverse character to present times. The neighborhood is connected to Pinole Vista Shopping Center by steps and to the Richmond Parkway Transit Center by an overcrossing beyond the aforementioned steps. There is a small strip mall at the neighborhood's entrance, which lies across from Rolling Hills Memorial Park, a cemetery, and Hilltop Park & Ride Lot, a commuter hub. Garritty Creek passes through the neighborhood. Richmond's only synagogue Temple Beth Hilel is located in the Green along Park Central Drive.
