= Antioch–Pittsburg station =

Railway station in Antioch, California

Antioch–Pittsburg, CA
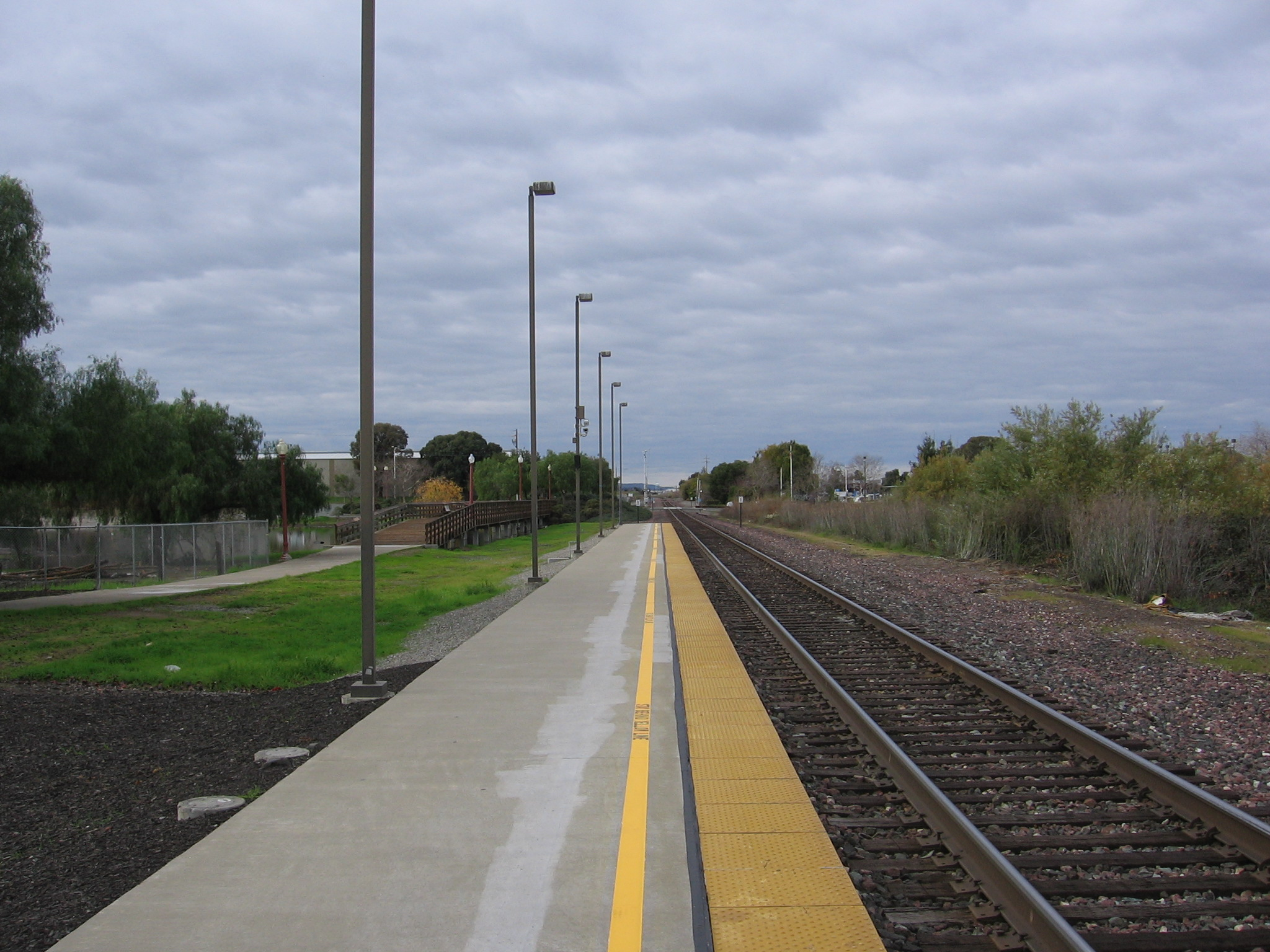
- Looking west along the station platform in December 2012

General information
- Location: 100 I Street; Antioch, California; United States
- Coordinates: 38.017975°N 121.817031°W
- Owner: City of Antioch
- Line: BNSF Stockton Subdivision
- Platforms: 1 side platform
- Tracks: 1
- Connections: Tri Delta Transit: 387, 388, 392

Construction
- Parking: Same-day street parking; Overnight parking (72-hour limit) available in nearby city-owned lot
- Accessible: No

Other information
- Status: Unstaffed
- Station code: Amtrak: ACA

History
- Opened: October 28, 1984

Passengers
- FY 2025: 35,667 (Amtrak)

Services
Preceding station	Amtrak	Following station
Martinez toward Oakland	Gold Runner	Stockton–San Joaquin Street toward Bakersfield
Location

Antioch–Pittsburg station is an unstaffed Amtrak station in Antioch, California and is the closest station to Pittsburg, California, which is located about two miles (3.2 km) west. It is served by Gold Runner trains operating on the branch between Oakland and Bakersfield. The station opened on October 28, 1984, and has a single side platform serving the single track of the BNSF Railway's Stockton Subdivision. The station may close when Oakley station opens in 2027.

== History ==
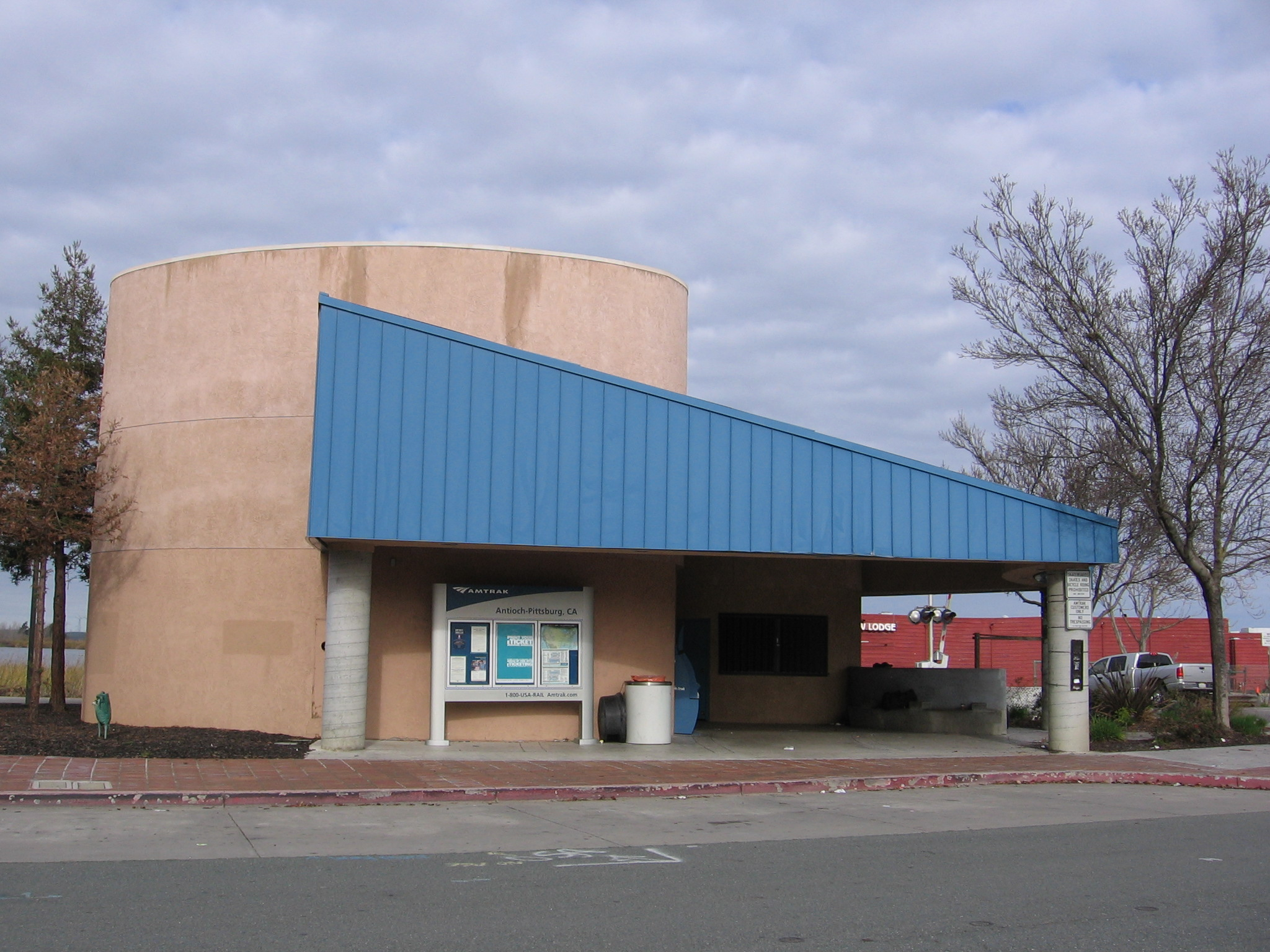
The station shelter building that stood from December 1990 until September 2019

The station opened on October 28, 1984 with a single side platform serving the single track of the BNSF Railway's Stockton Subdivision.

A small shelter building was added in December 1990, with an asymmetric teal-colored metal roof supported by concrete pillars. The building was a partially open-sided pavilion with sheltered concrete benches for travelers. The station building included a ticket booth for passenger assistance, but Amtrak's timetables never listed the station as staffed.

By the late 2010s, the shelter became an "area of concern" for Amtrak, the city of Antioch, and the San Joaquin Joint Powers Authority (SJJPA) because it was "in a consistent state of disarray due to vandalism and transient use." One particularly notable incident came in 2018 when law enforcement discovered a homeless encampment on the station's roof. Because of that incident, in early September 2019 the shelter structure was demolished and additional landscaping was added in January 2020.

Issues continued after the demolition, including assaults on Amtrak employees and theft of a wheelchair lift. In March 2023, the SJJPA voted to closed Antioch–Pittsburg station upon the opening of Oakley station, then expected in 2024. This proved locally controversial; by September 2024, the SJJPA indicated it was willing to consider keeping the station open if the city addressed the safety issues. By that time, Oakley station was expected to open in August 2025.

The Antioch City Council approved $225,000 to a project to help improve the station in order to help keep it open. This project, funded to the total of $375,000, would get the boost from the local gas tax. These upgrades would include putting up a new shelter, benches and fencing. It also would get the station new signage and lighting.
