= Refugio Creek =

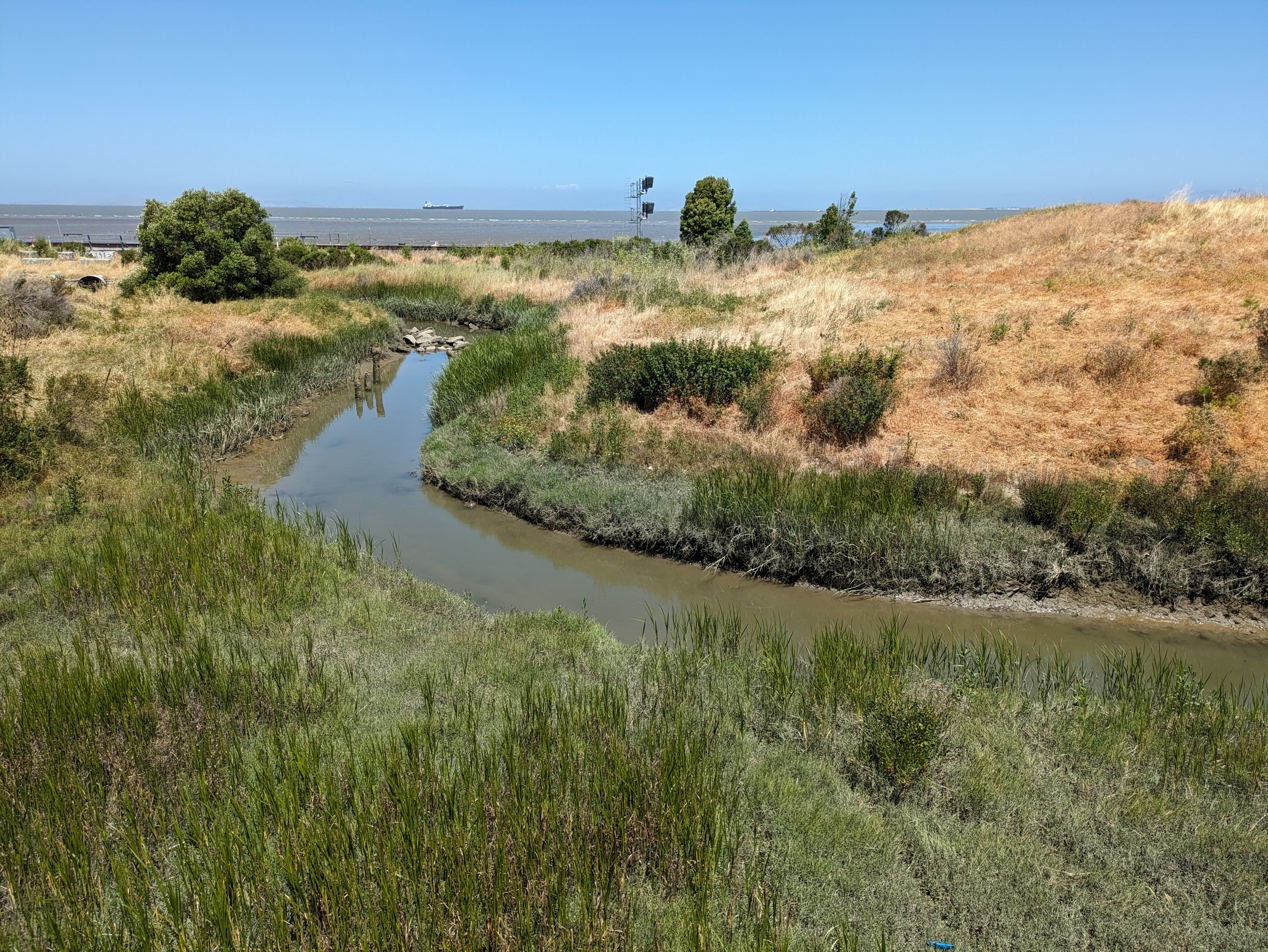

Location
- Country: United States
- State: California
- Region: Contra Costa County
- City: Rodeo, California

Physical characteristics
- Source
  - location: 4 mi (6 km) south of Crockett, California
  - coordinates: 37°59′48″N 122°13′27″W
  - elevation: 660 ft (200 m)
- Mouth: San Pablo Bay
  - location: southwest of Rodeo, California
  - coordinates: 38°1′18″N 122°17′7″W
  - elevation: 3 ft (0.91 m)

Refugio Creek (pronounced REH-foo-GEE-oh from Spanish refugio meaning: shelter) is a 4.4-mile-long (7.1 km) watercourse running through the Refugio Valley from the hills of western Contra Costa County, California.

== History ==
It runs from the hills to its mouth at San Pablo Bay through the city of Hercules and unincorporated areas, including the town of Rodeo. The creek passes through a dense suburban area in addition to Refugio Valley Park. The creek is almost entirely at the surface level and unaltered although its riparian habitat is largely destroyed in the more developed areas. Refugio means "refuge" in the Spanish language.

== See also ==
- List of watercourses in the San Francisco Bay Area
