= Hercules, California =

City in California, United States

- City
- City of Hercules
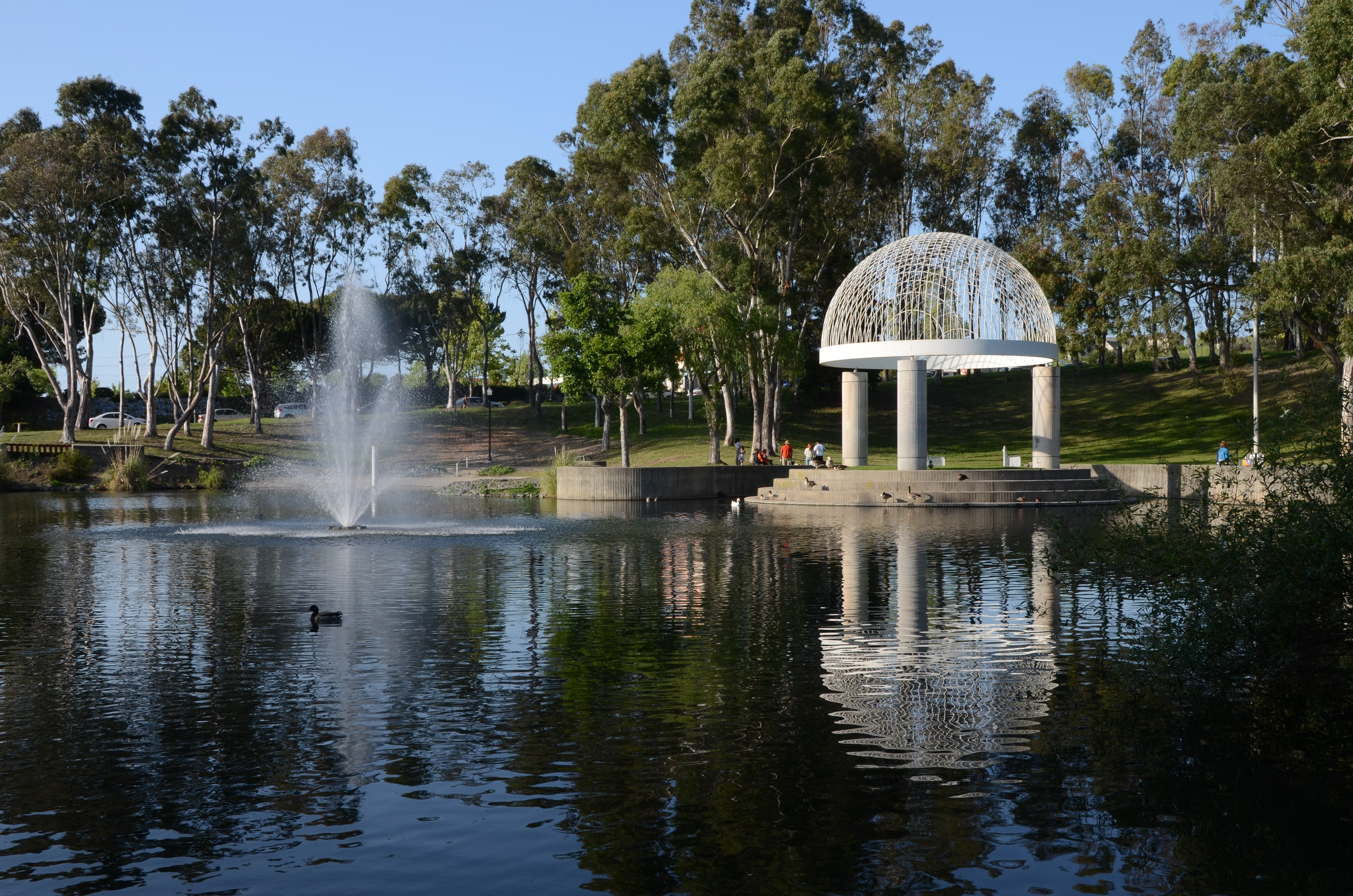
- Refugio Valley Park

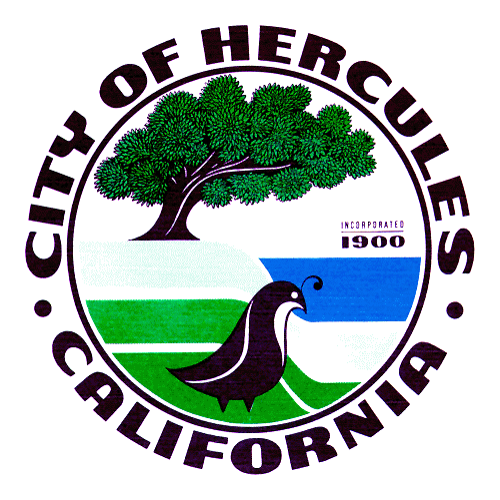
- Seal
- Motto: "The Dynamic City on the Bay"
- Interactive map of Hercules, California
- Location in the United States
- Coordinates: 38°01′02″N 122°17′19″W
- Country: United States
- State: California
- County: Contra Costa
- Incorporated: December 15, 1900
- Named for: Hercules Powder Company

Government
  - City Manager: Dante Hall
  - City Council: Mayor Dion Bailey; Vice Mayor Chris Kelley; Alexander Walker-Griffin; Dilli Bhattarai; Tiffany Grimsley
  - State Leg.: Sen. Jesse Arreguín (D); Asm. Buffy Wicks (D)
  - U. S. Congress: John Garamendi (D)

Area
  - Total: 19.99 sq mi (51.77 km^{2})
  - Land: 6.41 sq mi (16.61 km^{2})
  - Water: 13.58 sq mi (35.16 km^{2}) 67.91%
- Elevation: 79 ft (24 m)

Population (2020)
  - Total: 26,016
  - Density: 4,057/sq mi (1,566.3/km^{2})
- Time zone: UTC-8 (PST)
  - Summer (DST): UTC-7 (PDT)
- ZIP code: 94547
- Area codes: 510, 341
- FIPS code: 06-33308
- GNIS feature IDs: 1658738, 2410746
- Website: www.herculesca.gov

Hercules is a city in western Contra Costa County, California, United States. Situated along the coast of San Pablo Bay, it is located in the eastern region of the San Francisco Bay Area, approximately 10 miles (16 km) north of Berkeley. As of the 2020 census, its population was 26,016, according to the United States Census Bureau. The site of Hercules was first developed in 1881 as a manufacturing facility of the California Powder Works for the production of its patented dynamite formulation, Hercules powder. In 1882, the Hercules Powder Company was incorporated and assumed responsibility for the Hercules site. It was one of several explosive manufacturers that were active along the Pinole shoreline in the late 19th to the mid-20th century. The small company town that grew up near the facility subsequently became known as "Hercules", and was incorporated at the end of 1900. Starting in the 1970s, Hercules was heavily redeveloped as suburban bedroom community that lies along the I-80 corridor in Western Contra Costa County. It has a very ethnically diverse population.

== History ==
=== Prehistory through the 20th century ===
Contra Costa County’s first inhabitants arrived in the area six to ten thousand years ago, including the Bay Miwok people and the Huichin Ohlone People; however there were no known significant settlements in the Hercules area.

The land that would become Hercules was part of a tract of land known as “Pinol y Cañada del Hambre” which was granted in 1823 to Ygnacio Martinez (for whom the city of Martinez, California was named) for his service as the commandant of the Presidio of San Francisco. This grant was reconfirmed in 1842 as Rancho El Pinole. In 1848, this area became part of the United States with the rest of California. Contra Costa County was created in 1850 as one of California's original 27 counties. The Central Pacific Railroad (later part of Southern Pacific) ran the first rail lines across Hercules’ waterfront in late 1878, as the main route for the Transcontinental Railroad was realigned via train ferry through the purpose-built town of Port Costa then to Richmond and Berkeley to connect at the Oakland Pier. The Atchison, Topeka and Santa Fe Railroad came through the area around 1899.

The city's history was primarily shaped by the Hercules Powder Company, named after its main product “Hercules powder”, a specially patented (1874) formulation of dynamite, in turn named after the Roman hero. It began as the California Powder Works with locations in Golden Gate Park and Santa Cruz, California, but the expansion of San Francisco forced the company to find a more remote location for the dangerous process of manufacturing explosives. Hercules's isolated location at the time, plus its proximity to rail and water transportation along San Pablo Bay, made it an ideal choice. In 1879, the company, backed by DuPont and the Laflin & Rand Powder Company created the Hercules Powder Company which purchased land for a new plant that opened in 1881. On December 15, 1900, town management incorporated the City of Hercules as it felt that the County Board of Supervisors had become less supportive of the plant. A post office was established in 1914. On USGS maps the place designation Herpoco (for Hercules Powder Company) along the original Atchison, Topeka and Santa Fe Railway right-of-way (now BNSF), still remains.

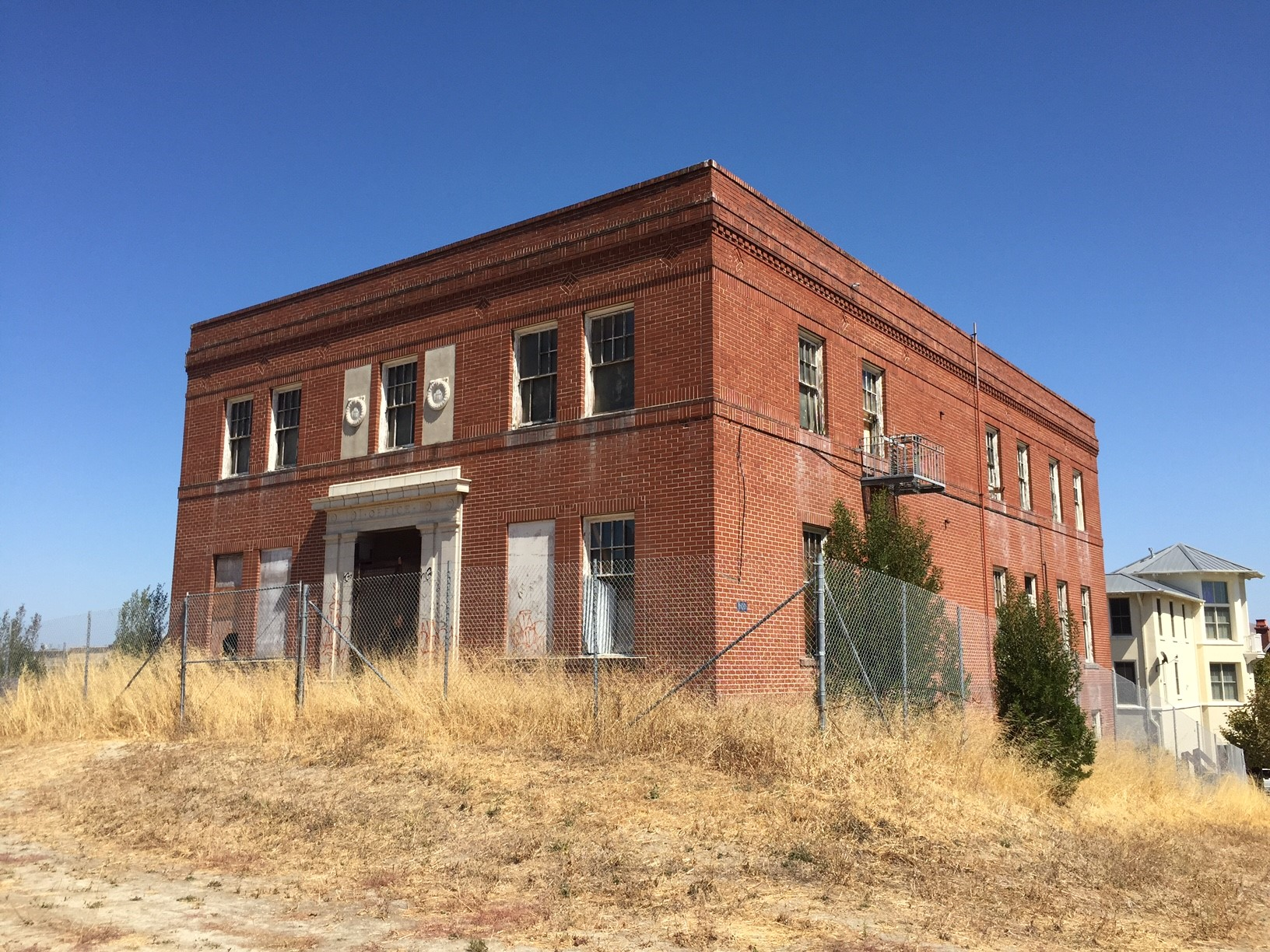
The old administration building for the Hercules Powder Company in 2016, constructed 1918. The building has been saved by its place on the National Register of Historic Places and is awaiting preservation.

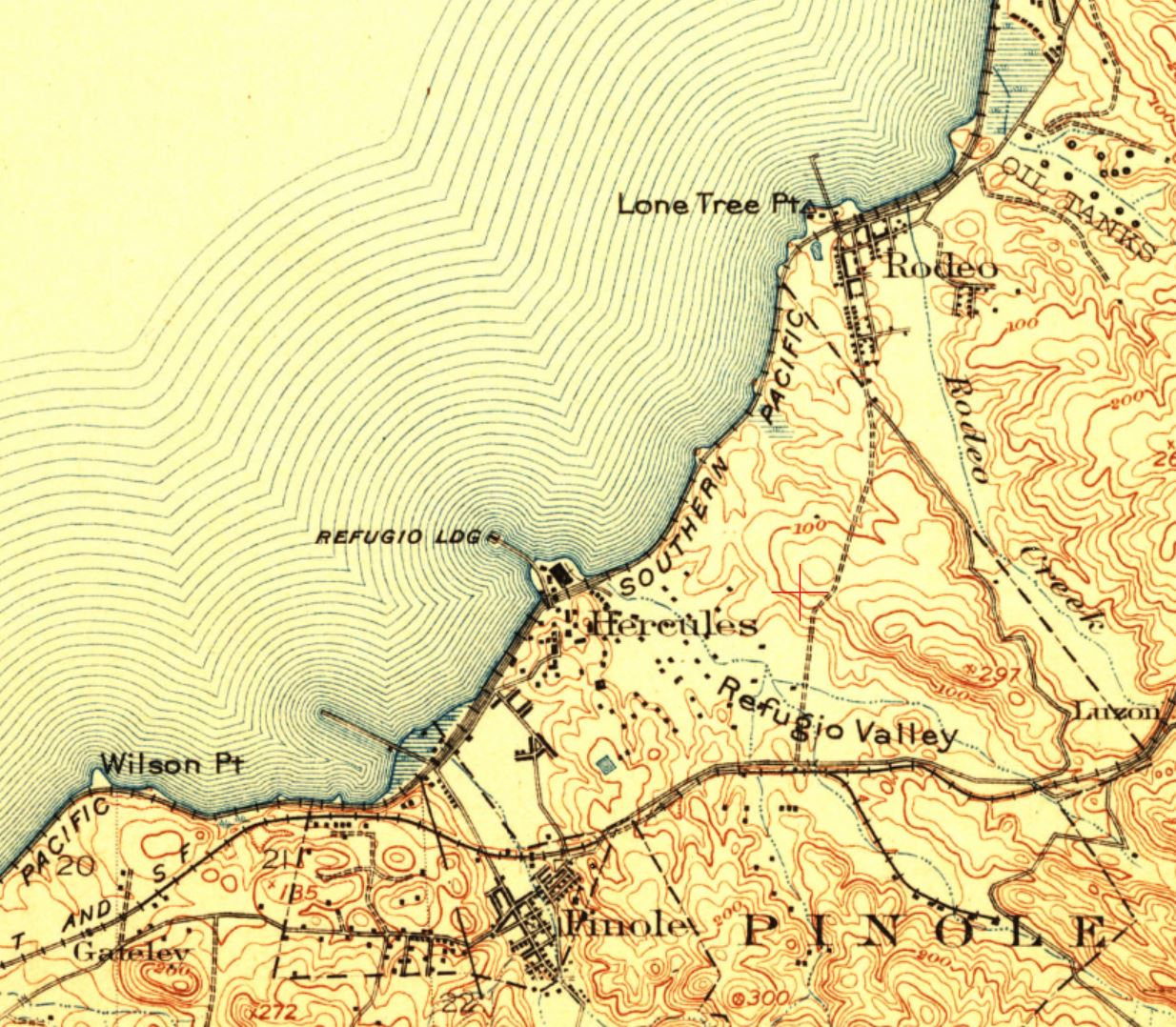
Excerpt from the 1916 USGS 1:24,000 Sectional centered on Hercules with Pinole to the south and Rodeo to the northeast. The town was centered close to the plant's location at the waterfront at Refugio Landing.

Explosives manufacturing was indeed a hazardous industry in that era: in the first 38 years of operations in Hercules, 59 lives would be lost including 24 in a large explosion in February 1908. Later, further deadly explosions would plague the plant in 1944, 1948 and 1953. The Sherman Antitrust Act would force Dupont to spin the Hercules Powder Company off as an independent company in 1912.

The explosives manufactured at Hercules played a significant and decisive role in the United States Army's efforts to contain the fires started by the 1906 San Francisco earthquake, as recounted by General Funston.

Between the 1890s and 1970s, Hercules was a company town of several hundred people. Thirty-six buildings from this era still exist and were nominated to the National Register of Historic Places in 1980. Per this application, “Hercules was the area’s most desirable community to live in” with well-kept homes, a (male only) clubhouse, lighted tennis courts, and hospital. However, all residents were company employees. Although Chinese workers were a large component of the company workforce before the 1910s, they were excluded from residency in the town beyond dormitories provided for them.

By 1917, the Hercules plant had become the largest producer of TNT in the country. During both World Wars Hercules Powder Company, along with Giant Powder Works in neighboring Pinole, supplied the U.S. Navy with explosives through the Port Chicago Magazine (location of the infamous Port Chicago disaster in 1944) which became the now closed Concord Naval Weapons Station. By the 1940s, Hercules organized its own law enforcement department and longtime Hercules Powder Company employee William Darke was named sheriff, becoming its first officer.

After World War II the company began to diversify its production line and build an anhydrous ammonia plant, a base for fertilizer. Explosive manufacturing was discontinued in Hercules in 1964 (neighboring Giant Powder stopped its operations in 1960). In 1974, the cessation of explosives production allowed hundreds of acres of protective “buffer” land (separated by large stands of eucalyptus trees, many of which still stand) to be reused for other purposes. Starting in 1974, real estate development companies began to develop the land and Hercules began to transform into the bedroom community it is known as today. Eventually, the ammonia plant began to be outcompeted by foreign manufacturers, and this combined with labor issues, resulted in its permanent closure in 1976. Although Hercules Powder Company is now gone one legacy remains: a study has been made of upper layer soil contamination from prior emissions of the California Powder Works operations.

In 1966 the Pacific Refinery company started operation on the shores of Hercules and served as large employer until its closure in 1995. Its demise marked the end of 114 years of heavy industry in Hercules. The land the refinery was located on was redeveloped as the Victoria by the Bay subdivision in early 2000s. Biorad, a Fortune 500 biotech company established its headquarters in Hercules in the 1980s and continues to be the town's largest employer.

Starting in the 1970s Hercules created and has continuously updated its master plan to further its development. During the 1970s, Hercules was one of the first cities in the United States to develop a comprehensive Noise Element of the General Plan. This work included the production of noise contour maps for all major highways and arterial roads, as well as a citywide noise mitigation plan. Heavy development as a suburb continued through the 1980s through the present day.

The town's population grew rapidly in the last decades of the 20th century. Per United States Census Bureau data, what was sleepy town of 252 in 1970 grew nearly 24-fold into a town of 5,963 by 1980 which tripled again into a town of 16,829 by 1990. By 2000, the town began to level out to its current population of approximately 25,000.

=== Recent history and development ===
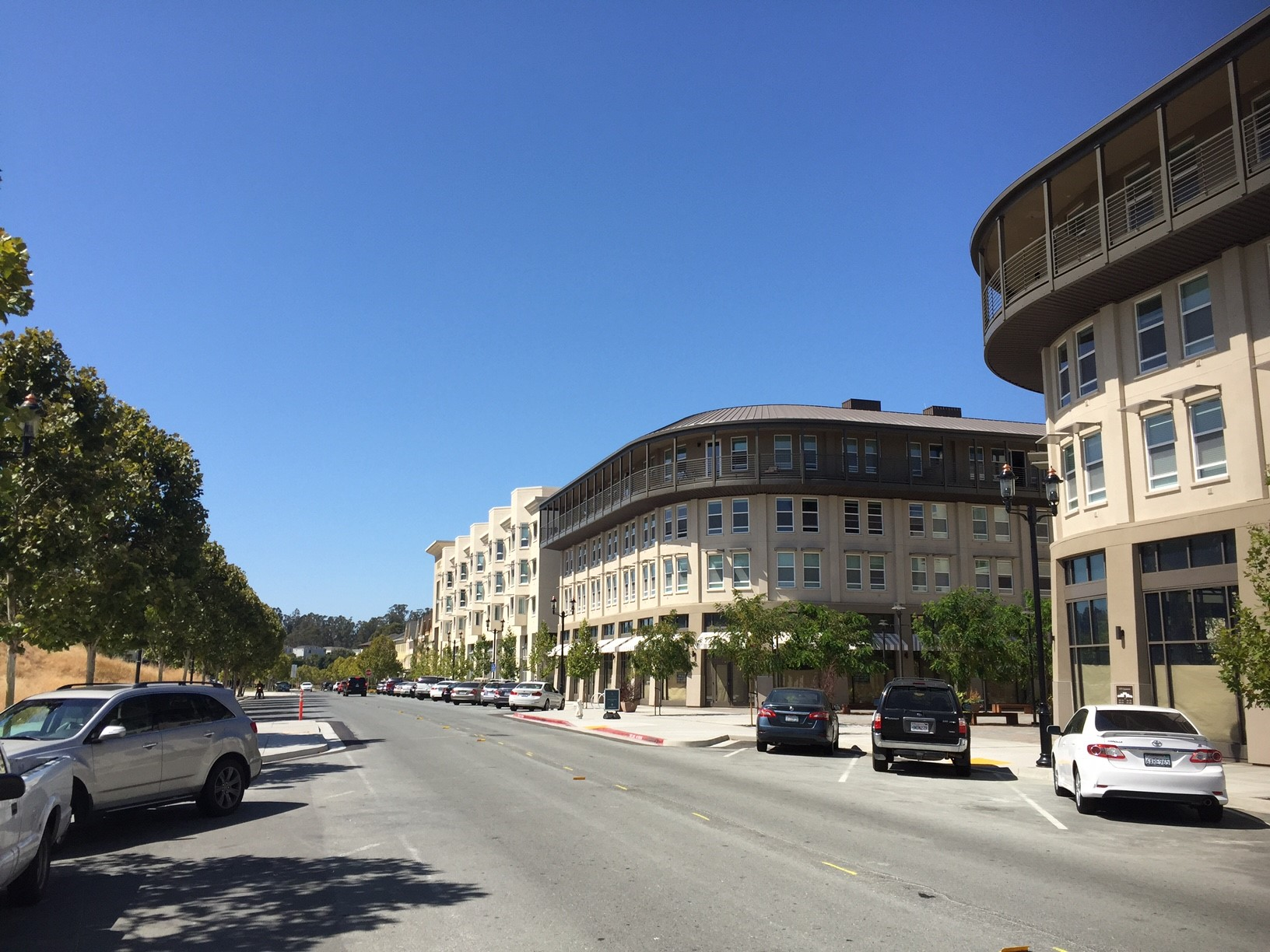
Looking eastward along Sycamore Avenue in Hercules in 2016. This area has been developed as higher density residential/mixed-use in the preceding decade.

In 2000, the City of Hercules chartered an urban-design-based land use planning effort. This plan attempted to balance the preservation of the city's undeveloped land against continued suburban sprawl and to redevelop the city's formerly industrial waterfront. The resulting plan directs that Hercules be turned into a transit-oriented, pedestrian-friendly, mixed-use town. Several new developments were started in that era based on the plan, including the Central Waterfront around the historic core of Hercules and Victoria by the Bay. However, the development of Hercules has not been without its challenges.

In a national story in 2006, Hercules strongly opposed Walmart's attempt to build a new supercenter store on 17-acre (69,000 m^{2}) property overlooking San Pablo Bay as many residents deemed it incompatible with the waterfront redevelopment project, and it was unneeded due to the close proximity of two other Walmarts in Richmond and Vallejo. On May 23, 2006, the Hercules city council voted unanimously to use its power of eminent domain to prevent Wal-Mart from building the supercenter. In 2009, the city purchased the land back from Walmart.

In 2012, a state audit found that the City of Hercules had spent nearly $50 million on “questionable transactions” primarily centered on the city's redevelopment projects (the investigation focused on city manager Nelson Oliva who steered millions of city funds to himself and to a firm run by his relatives). Combined with the Great recession, this nearly bankrupted the city in the late 2000s. Later, new developments came in the market and the city repaired its financial condition.

== Geography ==
=== Location and surroundings ===
Hercules is located at 38°01′02″N 122°17′19″W, at the southeastern shore of the San Pablo Bay. According to the United States Census Bureau, the city has a total area of 18.2 square miles (47 km^{2}), of which 6.2 square miles (16 km^{2}) is land and 12.0 square miles (31 km^{2}) (65.87%) is water.

Hercules is on the southeastern shores of San Pablo Bay, roughly four miles southwest of the Carquinez Bridge. By road, Hercules is roughly 12 miles north of Berkeley, 18 miles north of Oakland and 22 miles northeast of San Francisco. The shoreline at this location runs northeast to southwest. Refugio Creek runs through the middle of Hercules in a northwesterly direction and empties at the shoreline.

The town is bisected by Interstate 80, which runs parallel and roughly one mile inland from the coast. I-80 is the main highway between San Francisco and Sacramento and intersects California State Route 4 within the city limits. Major arterial roads include San Pablo Road, which lies to the north of I-80 (this road is also Historic US 40, which was the predecessor to I-80) and Refugio Valley Road, which runs in a northwest–southeast direction along Refugio Creek.

=== Cityscape ===
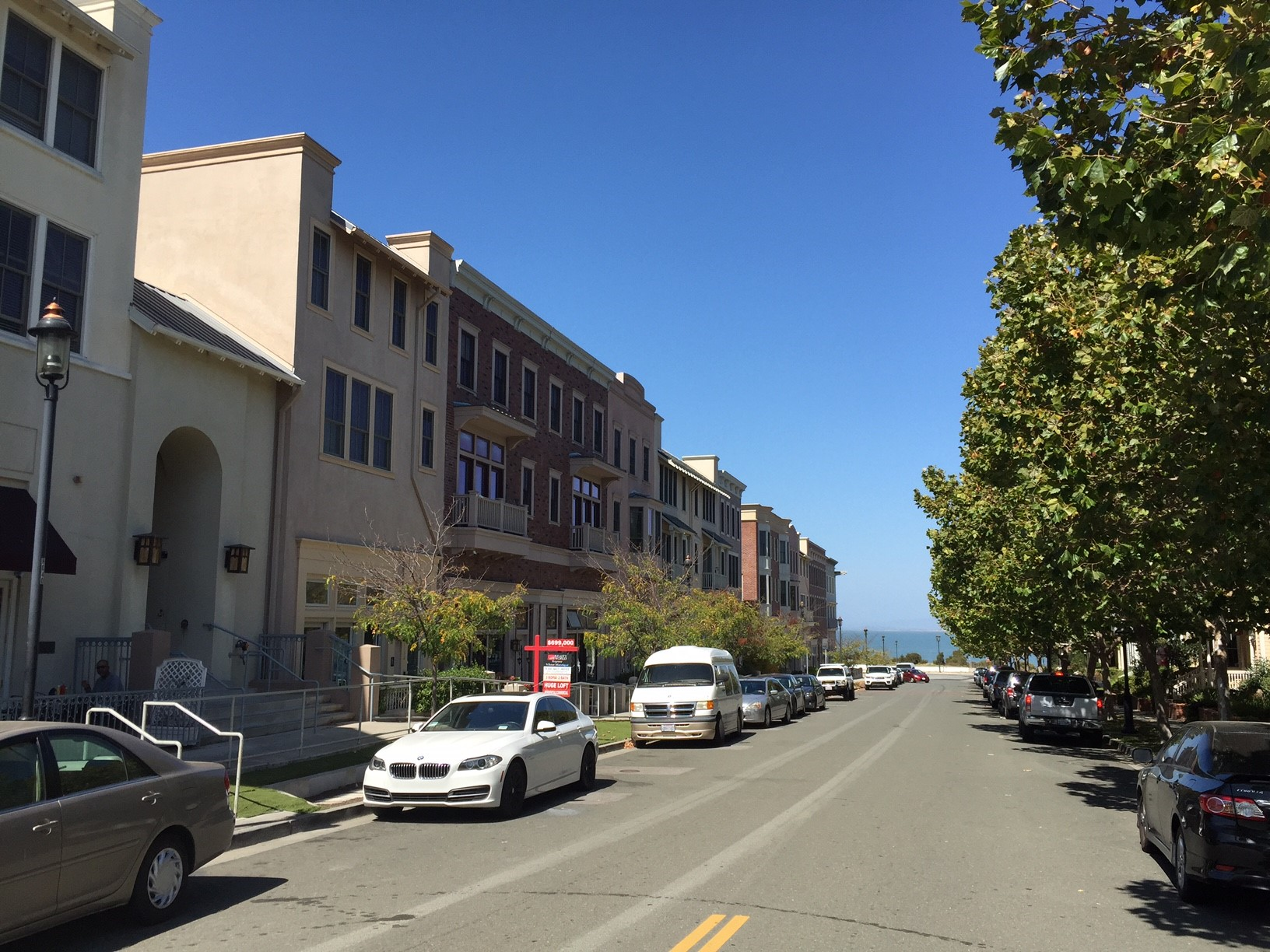
Looking northward along Railroad Ave in Hercules in 2016. This redevelopment is centered near the circa 1900s company town location

The city has a predominantly suburban character dominated by two story detached and attached homes and one story commercial buildings divided into various subdivisions along well landscaped roads. The waterfront, which has a planned rail/ferry station, is zoned for higher density transit oriented development with community retail, and a number of 3 to 5 story mixed-use developments have been constructed there since 2015. The portion inland of Highway 80, which extends 4 miles inland mainly gently rolling hills along Refugio Valley Road, is primarily suburbs built between the 1970s and 1980s. It includes neighborhoods known to the locals as “the Birds”, “the Trees and Flowers”, “the Gemstones”, “the Astronauts”, and “the Islands”, per the street naming conventions of each subdivision. The portion near the shoreline, somewhat flatter but still rolling terrain, was developed starting in the 1980s and has some of the town's newer developments including the Waterfront centered around the historic old town, Olympian Hills (which uses Greek mythical figures for its street naming convention), Hercules by the Bay, Village Park and Victoria by the Bay/New Pacific.

=== Climate ===
Hercules has a mild Mediterranean climate (Köppen climate classification Csb or "Warm-summer Mediterranean"), consistent with much of the northern San Francisco Bay Area. As Hercules is more inland, it is generally warmer than communities closer to the Golden Gate. Average rainfall is 23.35” concentrated from November to March. The average July high is 71 degrees and the average January low is 43 degrees.

Climate data for Hercules, California
| Month | Jan | Feb | Mar | Apr | May | Jun | Jul | Aug | Sep | Oct | Nov | Dec | Year |
|---|---|---|---|---|---|---|---|---|---|---|---|---|---|
| Record high °F (°C) | 76 (24) | 88 (31) | 85 (29) | 94 (34) | 100 (38) | 106 (41) | 98 (37) | 98 (37) | 107 (42) | 100 (38) | 86 (30) | 83 (28) | 106 (41) |
| Mean daily maximum °F (°C) | 57 (14) | 61 (16) | 63 (17) | 66 (19) | 68 (20) | 71 (22) | 70 (21) | 71 (22) | 73 (23) | 72 (22) | 64 (18) | 57 (14) | 66 (19) |
| Mean daily minimum °F (°C) | 43 (6) | 45 (7) | 47 (8) | 48 (9) | 51 (11) | 54 (12) | 55 (13) | 56 (13) | 56 (13) | 53 (12) | 48 (9) | 43 (6) | 50 (10) |
| Record low °F (°C) | 27 (−3) | 28 (−2) | 33 (1) | 31 (−1) | 38 (3) | 43 (6) | 44 (7) | 44 (7) | 46 (8) | 41 (5) | 34 (1) | 24 (−4) | 24 (−4) |
| Average rainfall inches (mm) | 4.91 (125) | 4.41 (112) | 3.52 (89) | 1.35 (34) | 0.54 (14) | 0.17 (4.3) | 0.07 (1.8) | 0.09 (2.3) | 0.27 (6.9) | 1.25 (32) | 3.47 (88) | 3.30 (84) | 23.35 (593.3) |

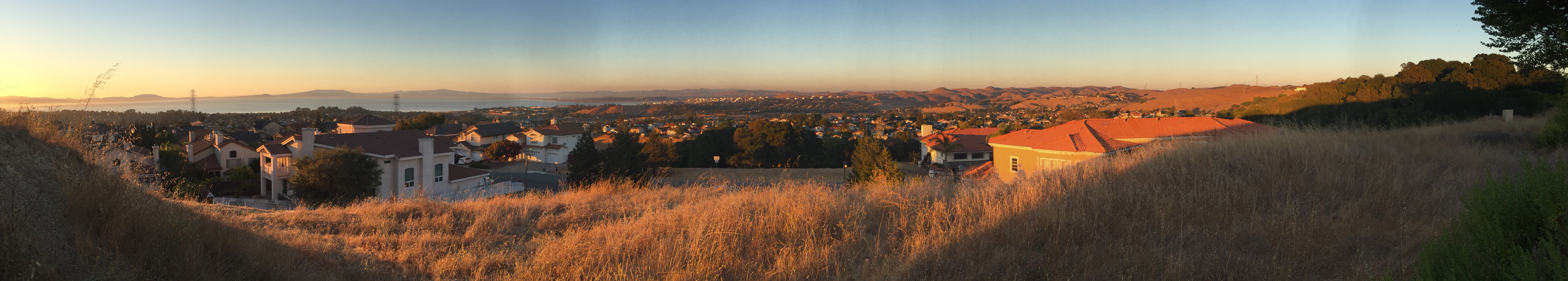
View of Hercules northward from the “Gemstones” neighborhood to San Pablo Bay in 2016

=== Parks and recreation ===
Hercules has over 98 acres of parkland in six parks created as part of its master planning effort, the most central being Refugio Valley Park, and has over 950 additional acres of open space. Hercules is also close to several regional nature preserves including Point Pinole Regional Shoreline, Crockett Hills Regional Park, Carquinez Strait, Wildcat Canyon and Sobrante Ridge Botanic Regional Preserve. Franklin Canyon Golf Course is an 18-hole golf course at the east side of the city. The San Francisco Bay Trail runs right along Hercules' waterfront. The urban centers of Oakland and San Francisco are 18 and 22 miles away respectively. Wine Country (Napa and Sonoma) is roughly a half hour drive to the north.

== Demographics ==
=== Household income, education and occupations ===
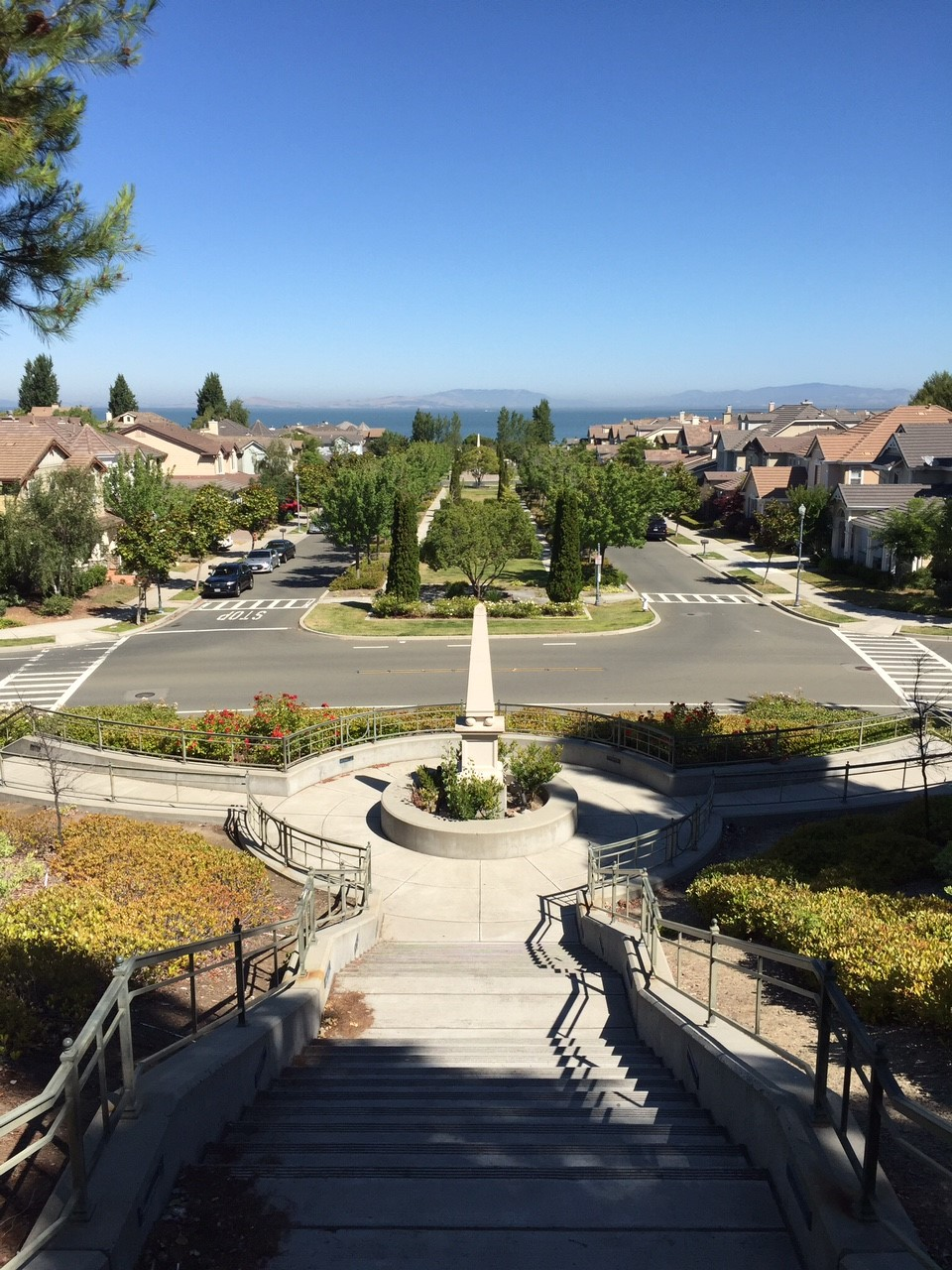
Looking northward from the Victoria Park (in the Victoria by the Bay neighborhood) in Hercules, California to San Pablo Bay in 2016

Per 2014 US Census data, the median household income in the city was $101,018, and the median income for a family was $113,658, which would put much of Hercules’ population in the upper middle class or “mass affluent” categories. Males had a median income of $66,348 and females had a median income of $59,517. The per capita income for the city was $37,247. About 4.0% of families and 5.1% of the population were below the poverty line, including 5.2% of persons under age 18 and 3.2% of those 65 or over. Per the same dataset, 42.7% of Hercules residents were college educated. 46.0% of residents were employed in management, business and arts occupations, 27.2% in sales and office occupations, and 14.3% in service occupations.

Historical population
| Census | Pop. | Note | %± |
|---|---|---|---|
| 1910 | 279 | | — |
| 1920 | 373 | | 33.7% |
| 1930 | 392 | | 5.1% |
| 1940 | 343 | | −12.5% |
| 1950 | 343 | | 0.0% |
| 1960 | 310 | | −9.6% |
| 1970 | 252 | | −18.7% |
| 1980 | 5,963 | | 2,266.3% |
| 1990 | 16,829 | | 182.2% |
| 2000 | 19,488 | | 15.8% |
| 2010 | 24,060 | | 23.5% |
| 2020 | 26,016 | | 8.1% |
U.S. Decennial Census

=== 2020 census ===
As of the 2020 census, Hercules had a population of 26,016 and a population density of 4,056.8 inhabitants per square mile (1,566.3/km^{2}). The median age was 42.4 years. The age distribution was 19.1% under the age of 18, 7.4% aged 18 to 24, 27.0% aged 25 to 44, 28.2% aged 45 to 64, and 18.3% who were 65 years of age or older. For every 100 females there were 92.4 males, and for every 100 females age 18 and over there were 89.1 males age 18 and over.

The census reported that 99.8% of the population lived in households, 0.2% lived in non-institutionalized group quarters, and 0.0% were institutionalized. In addition, 100.0% of residents lived in urban areas, while 0.0% lived in rural areas.

There were 8,861 households in Hercules, of which 34.2% had children under the age of 18 living in them. Of all households, 55.6% were married-couple households, 4.6% were cohabiting couple households, 26.6% had a female householder with no spouse or partner present, and 13.2% had a male householder with no spouse or partner present. About 19.1% of all households were made up of individuals and 8.7% had someone living alone who was 65 years of age or older. The average household size was 2.93, and there were 6,745 families (76.1% of all households).

There were 9,165 housing units at an average density of 1,429.1 units per square mile (551.8 units/km^{2}), of which 8,861 (96.7%) were occupied and 304 (3.3%) were vacant. Of occupied units, 77.1% were owner-occupied and 22.9% were occupied by renters. The homeowner vacancy rate was 0.4%; the rental vacancy rate was 6.2%.

Racial composition as of the 2020 census
| Race | Number | Percent |
|---|---|---|
| White | 4,221 | 16.2% |
| Black or African American | 4,181 | 16.1% |
| American Indian and Alaska Native | 155 | 0.6% |
| Asian | 12,191 | 46.9% |
| Native Hawaiian and Other Pacific Islander | 142 | 0.5% |
| Some other race | 2,239 | 8.6% |
| Two or more races | 2,887 | 11.1% |
| Hispanic or Latino (of any race) | 4,320 | 16.6% |

=== 2010 census ===
The 2010 United States census reported that Hercules had a population of 24,060. The population density was 1,323.5 inhabitants per square mile (511.0/km^{2}). The racial makeup of Hercules was 5,302 (22.0%) White, 4,547 (18.9%) African American, 102 (0.4%) Native American, 10,956 (45.5%) Asian, 101 (0.4%) Pacific Islander, 1,564 (6.5%) from other races, and 1,488 (6.2%) from two or more races. Hispanic or Latino of any race were 3,508 persons (14.6%).

The Census reported that 24,005 people (99.8% of the population) lived in households, 17 (0.1%) lived in non-institutionalized group quarters, and 38 (0.2%) were institutionalized.

There were 8,115 households, out of which 3,175 (39.1%) had children under the age of 18 living in them, 4,675 (57.6%) were opposite-sex married couples living together, 1,250 (15.4%) had a female householder with no husband present, 371 (4.6%) had a male householder with no wife present. There were 344 (4.2%) unmarried opposite-sex partnerships, and 66 (0.8%) same-sex married couples or partnerships. 1,482 households (18.3%) were made up of individuals, and 449 (5.5%) had someone living alone who was 65 years of age or older. The average household size was 2.96. There were 6,296 families (77.6% of all households); the average family size was 3.38.

The population was spread out, with 5,481 people (22.8%) under the age of 18, 2,064 people (8.6%) aged 18 to 24, 6,512 people (27.1%) aged 25 to 44, 7,473 people (31.1%) aged 45 to 64, and 2,530 people (10.5%) who were 65 years of age or older. The median age was 39.0 years. For every 100 females, there were 90.1 males. For every 100 females age 18 and over, there were 86.0 males.

There were 8,553 housing units at an average density of 470.5 units per square mile (181.7 units/km^{2}), of which 8,115 were occupied, of which 6,450 (79.5%) were owner-occupied, and 1,665 (20.5%) were occupied by renters. The homeowner vacancy rate was 2.3%; the rental vacancy rate was 6.2%. 19,067 people (79.2% of the population) lived in owner-occupied housing units and 4,938 people (20.5%) lived in rental housing units.

== Economy ==
=== Overview ===
Hercules is primarily a suburban community, but is the headquarters of Bio-Rad, a Fortune 500 biotech company which as of 2017 had 7,800 employees worldwide and $2.1 billion in revenue. The company is located in the North Shore Business park which includes over 1.1 million square feet of industrial and R&D space. The community has an additional 210,000sf of retail and office space in three neighborhood shopping centers.. In the 1980s the city was known for the company Hercules Computer Technology, makers of the Hercules Graphics Card.

=== Top employers ===
According to the city's 2020 Comprehensive Annual Financial Report, the top 10 employers in the city are:

| # | Employer | # of employees |
|---|---|---|
| 1 | Bio-Rad Laboratories | 2,271 |
| 2 | West Contra Costa Unified School District | 238 |
| 3 | Home Depot | 198 |
| 4 | Contra Costa County Social Services | 106 |
| 5 | Lucky Supermarkets | 100 |
| 6 | Pacific Bio Labs Inc | 94 |
| 7 | City of Hercules | 60 |
| 8 | Kinder's Meats & Deli BBQ & Catering | 40 |
| 9 | Benda Tool & Model Works Inc | 36 |
| 10 | Big Lots | 25 |

== Government ==
=== Form ===
Hercules has a council-manager form of government where five elected city council members appoint a city manager who runs the City administration. In the early years of Hercules, the council members were nearly always officers of the Hercules Powder Company. The five council seats are at large and served in four-year staggered terms. Elections are held the first Tuesday after the first Monday in November, which generally coincides with state and federal election days. In December, after any election the council selects from its own a Mayor and Vice Mayor which serve one-year terms. The City Council also appoint the city attorney, planning commissioners, community and library associations and others.

=== Crime ===
Hercules has a generally low crime rate. Based on 2014 FBI Data, Hercules had 1.12 violent crimes per 1,000 and 13.27 property crimes per thousand, lower than national and state averages. Between 2000 and 2010, the city had only five murders. Another source, using the same data, classified Hercules as the 35th safest city in California in 2016, and 60th in 2017.

=== Politics ===
In 2017, Hercules had 14,293 registered voters with 8,406 (58.8%) registered as Democrats, 1,743 (12.2%) registered as Republicans, and 3,703 (25.9%) decline to state voters.

== Education ==
=== Public schools ===
Hercules is served by two school districts: the West Contra Costa Unified School District and the John Swett Unified School District. The JSUSD serves the Foxboro area (east of Interstate 80 and north of State Route 4) and the WCCUSD serves the rest of the city.

- Hercules Middle/High School serves as the main middle and high school in the city.
- Hanna Ranch Elementary serves the Trees and Mandalay area.
- Ohlone Elementary serves the Birds, Gems and the Hercules Avenue area.
- Lupine Elementary serves the Trees and Flowers area.

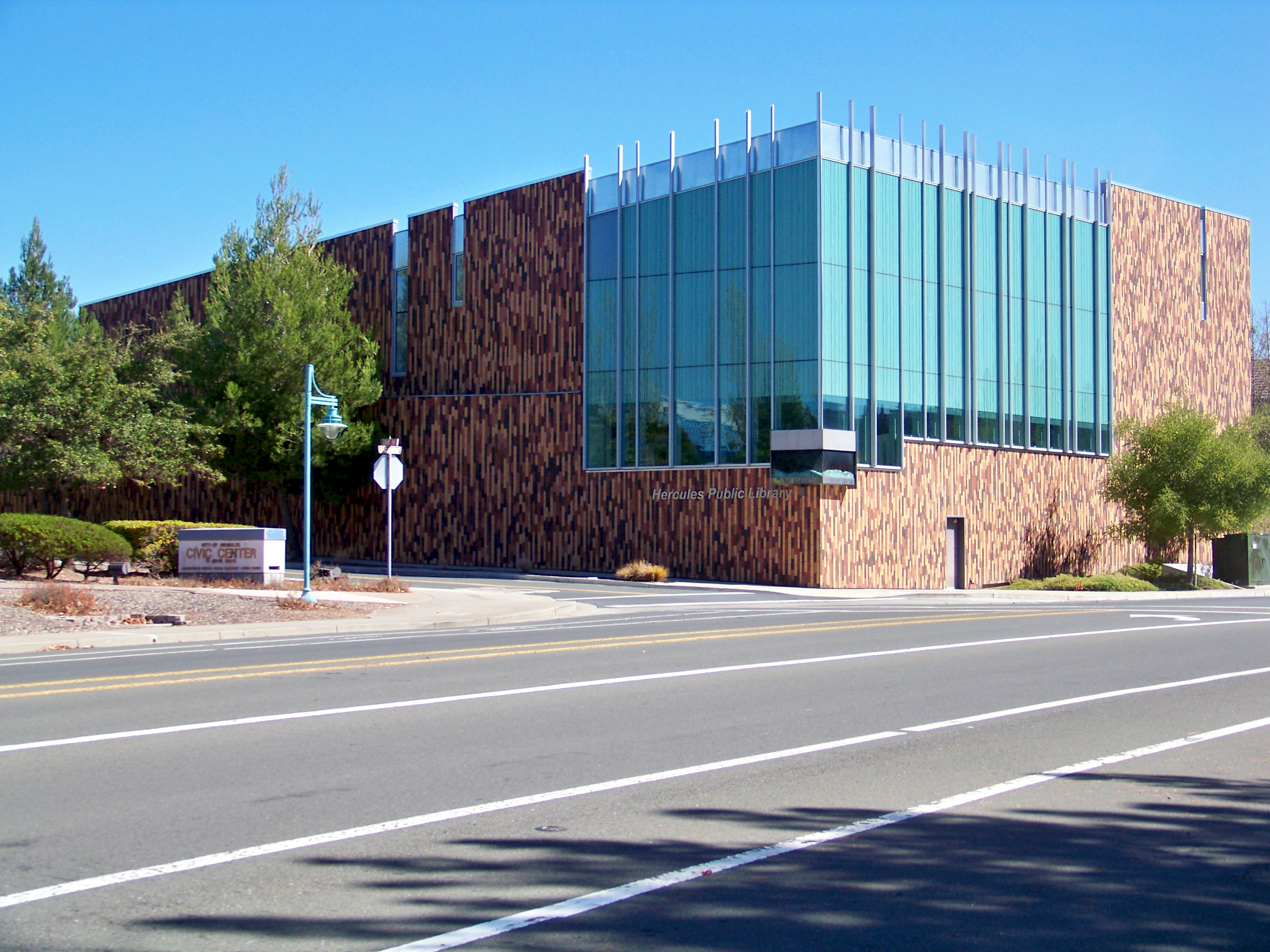
Hercules Public Library

=== Public libraries ===
The Contra Costa County Library System operates the Hercules Public Library.

== Infrastructure ==
=== Transportation ===
Hercules is at the intersection of I-80 and State Route 4. I-80 is an interstate that is the principal route between San Francisco and Sacramento. Highway 4 lead to I -680 which provide access to Concord, California, Walnut Creek, California and the Tri-Valley Area. Per 2015 Census Data, 90% of Hercules’ workforce commutes via automobile to work, the average commute time is 39 minutes.

Public transportation is available through the WestCat bus system. The operator provides local and school buses throughout Hercules and to the neighboring cities of Rodeo, Pinole, and Richmond among other areas. WestCat also offers express buses to the county seat at Martinez, the El Cerrito del Norte BART station and the San Francisco Transbay Terminal. Its major hub is Hercules Transit Center. This had been the proposed location of a future Bay Area Rapid Transit station in BART's 20-year plan, but Hercules Mayor John Delgado and city council declined BART's request to fund a study, precluding the possibility of a BART stop.

The closest international airports are Oakland International (29 miles) and San Francisco International Airport (35 miles). The closest general aviation facilities are Buchanan Field in Concord and Napa County Airport in Napa.

The Southern Pacific and the Burlington Northern railroads (formerly the Atchison, Topeka and the Santa Fe Railway) have rail lines that pass through Hercules; however with the demise of industry Hercules no longer has a direct rail connection. However, a new Hercules station is planned that will provide a stop along the Capitol Corridor line, the first phases of which were constructed by 2018. An environmental study is underway for San Francisco Bay Ferry Service to provide service from the same station to San Francisco, which would take 42 minutes.

== Sister city ==
- Tsushima, Aichi Prefecture, Japan.

== Notable people ==
- Willie McGee, former outfielder for the St. Louis Cardinals and the San Francisco Giants
- Claudell Washington, former MLB outfielder who lived in Hercules during his year with the New York Mets and his first year with the Atlanta Braves.
