= Hilltop Lake Park =

City park in Richmond, California

Coordinates: 37.98484°N 122.3301°W

Hilltop Lake Park, United States, is a city of Richmond, California park in the San Francisco Bay Area situated at Richmond Parkway and Lakeside Drive in the Hilltop neighborhood. The park encompasses Hilltop Lake and several tributaries of Garrity Creek, a grasslands covered canyon. It is located between housing and Hilltop Mall Shopping Center and is a small pristine area surrounded by otherwise developed urban and suburban areas consisting of waterfowl and wildlife wetlands habitat. The park has 35 acres (14 ha) and the city is trying to further develop the park with a small visitor center, pier in the lake, trails, and accessibility with the surrounding area including the Richmond-Hilltop Y.M.C.A.
