= San Joaquin Street station =

Amtrak station in Stockton, California, US

Stockton, CA
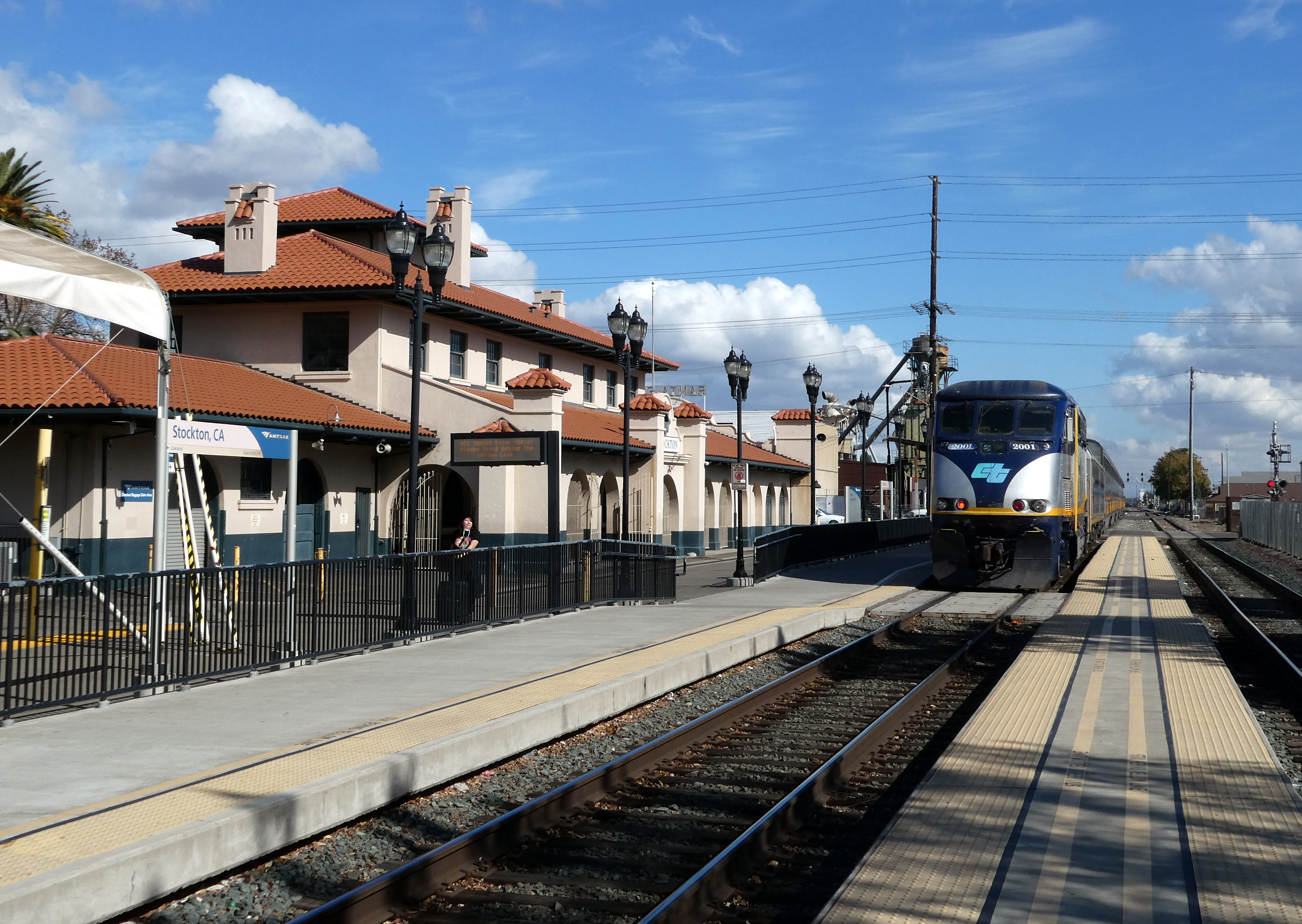
- A San Joaquins train at the station in 2024

General information
- Location: 735 South San Joaquin Street; Stockton, California; United States
- Coordinates: 37°56′43″N 121°17′08″W
- Owner: BNSF Railway
- Line: BNSF Stockton Subdivision
- Platforms: 1 side platform, 1 island platform
- Tracks: 2
- Bus stands: 4
- Connections: Amtrak Thruway: 3, 6; San Joaquin RTD: 315, 510, 710

Construction
- Parking: Yes
- Accessible: Yes

Other information
- Status: Staffed, checked baggage service available
- Station code: Amtrak: SKN

History
- Opened: 1900
- Rebuilt: 2005
- Original company: Atchison, Topeka and Santa Fe Railway

Passengers
- FY 2025: 274,640 (Amtrak)

Services
Preceding station	Amtrak	Following station
Antioch–Pittsburg toward Oakland	Gold Runner	Modesto toward Bakersfield
Former services
Preceding station	Amtrak	Following station
Antioch–Pittsburg toward Oakland	San Joaquins	Riverbank until 1999 toward Bakersfield
Preceding station	Atchison, Topeka and Santa Fe Railway	Following station
Holt toward Richmond	Valley Division	Escalon toward Barstow
Location

San Joaquin Street station, also known as Stockton – San Joaquin Street, is an Amtrak station in Stockton, California. Originally built for the Atchison, Topeka and Santa Fe Railway (which acquired the San Francisco and San Joaquin Valley Railroad), it is a stop for trains on Amtrak's Gold Runner line between Oakland and Bakersfield. The Mission Revival style building cost $24,470 to construct (equivalent to $777,375 in 2025), and includes typical design features such as stuccoed walls, a red tile roof and shady arcades.

The San Joaquin Street station is one of two train stations in Stockton. San Joaquin trains running between Sacramento and Bakersfield, as well as Altamont Corridor Express (ACE) trains do not pass this station and instead use the Robert J. Cabral Station closer to downtown.

Two Amtrak Thruway bus routes serve this station. Route 3 connects passengers to the other station in Stockton, Sacramento, Chico and Redding. Route 6 connects with San Jose.
