= Garrity Creek =

Location
- Country: United States
- State: California
- Region: Contra Costa County
- City: Richmond, California

Physical characteristics
- Source
  - location: El Sobrante, California
  - coordinates: 37°58′49″N 122°18′14″W
- Mouth: San Pablo Bay
  - location: Pinole, California
  - coordinates: 38°0′11″N 122°19′43″W
  - elevation: 7 ft (2.1 m)

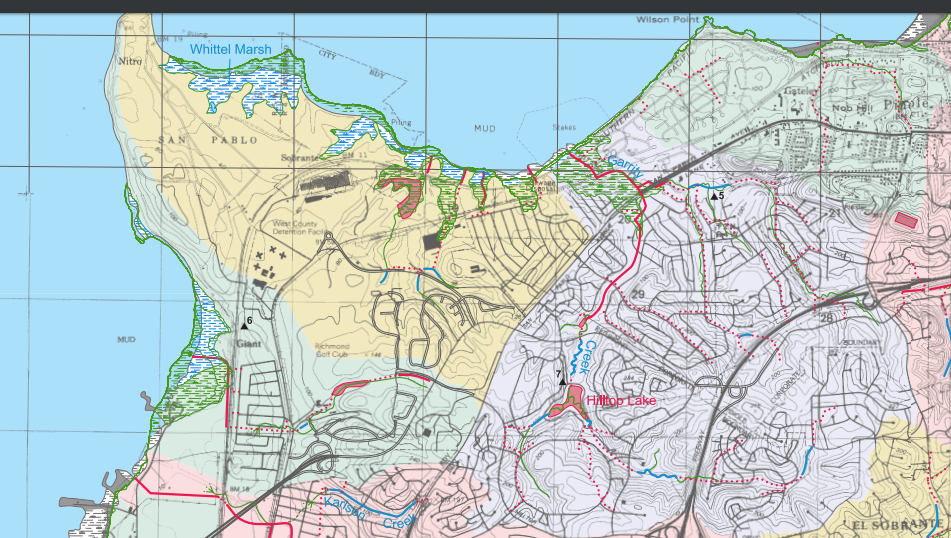
An excerpt of a larger watershed map; this image shows the pathway of Garrity Creek from its source to its mouth in the San Pablo Bay Sections in red have been altered by development; engineered channels, culverted under ground, or simply moved and straightened.

Garrity Creek is a 3.0-mile-long (4.8 km) creek in Richmond, California's Hilltop neighborhood. It runs into San Pablo Bay. It is sometimes called Hilltop Creek.

The creek is supported by two springs, two separate legs which join into Garrity Creek in El Sobrante, California. The basin feeding this watershed was, for hundreds of years, a sacred fishing and hunting site for the Huchiun Band of the Native Ohlone at Garrity Creek & Along San Pablo Bay. Garrity Creek was a highly prized and sacred site because it provided food; acorns from tanbark, valley, coast and live oak trees, as well as buckeye trees. The Huchiun also harvested seeds, berries, greens, nuts and roots in the basin and would travel along Garrity Creek to fish for steelhead, salmon and sturgeon that swam up Garrity Creek to spawn.

Major sections of the creek have been dramatically, and perhaps irrecoverably altered by development. Much of waterway to the bay is now underground; in culverts under the Hilltop Green residential development, under highway 80, and under the Hilltop Mall. Just north of the Hilltop mall, the water is retained in "Hilltop Lake". This man made lake was first created by the Standard Oil company as a recreation site for its employees in the early 1900s. This lake and area around it has now been designated as Hilltop Lake Park

For nearly 20 years, the headwaters of Garrity Creek were threatened by potential development. This was opposed by residents, neighborhood associations, the organization Friends of Garrity Creek and environmentalists. They claimed the proposed plans for developing the 10-acre (40,000 m^{2}) site were illegal since it violates county rules prohibiting construction on slopes steeper than 26 feet (8 m). Ultimately, the developer was forced into bankruptcy in 2010 and the creek was saved, for the time being.

In 2011, in perhaps the best possible turn of events for Garrity Creek and the watershed, a group of organic farmers purchased the 10-acre property. They have planted over 1000 fruiting trees and shrubs on the landscape in "swales" that will help protect the water quality of Garrity creek and rehydrate the groundwater that supports the springs which feed the creek.
