= Richmond Parkway Transit Center =

Transit hub in Richmond, California

Coordinates: 37.985991°N 122.31622°W

The Richmond Parkway Transit Center, or RPTC, is a park and ride lot and bus terminal located in Richmond, California. It is named after the adjacent Richmond Parkway and serves as a transfer point for WestCAT and AC Transit. The center is situated on the corner of Richmond Parkway and Blume Drive, near the Pinole border and adjacent to Interstate 80 and the Hilltop Plaza shopping center.

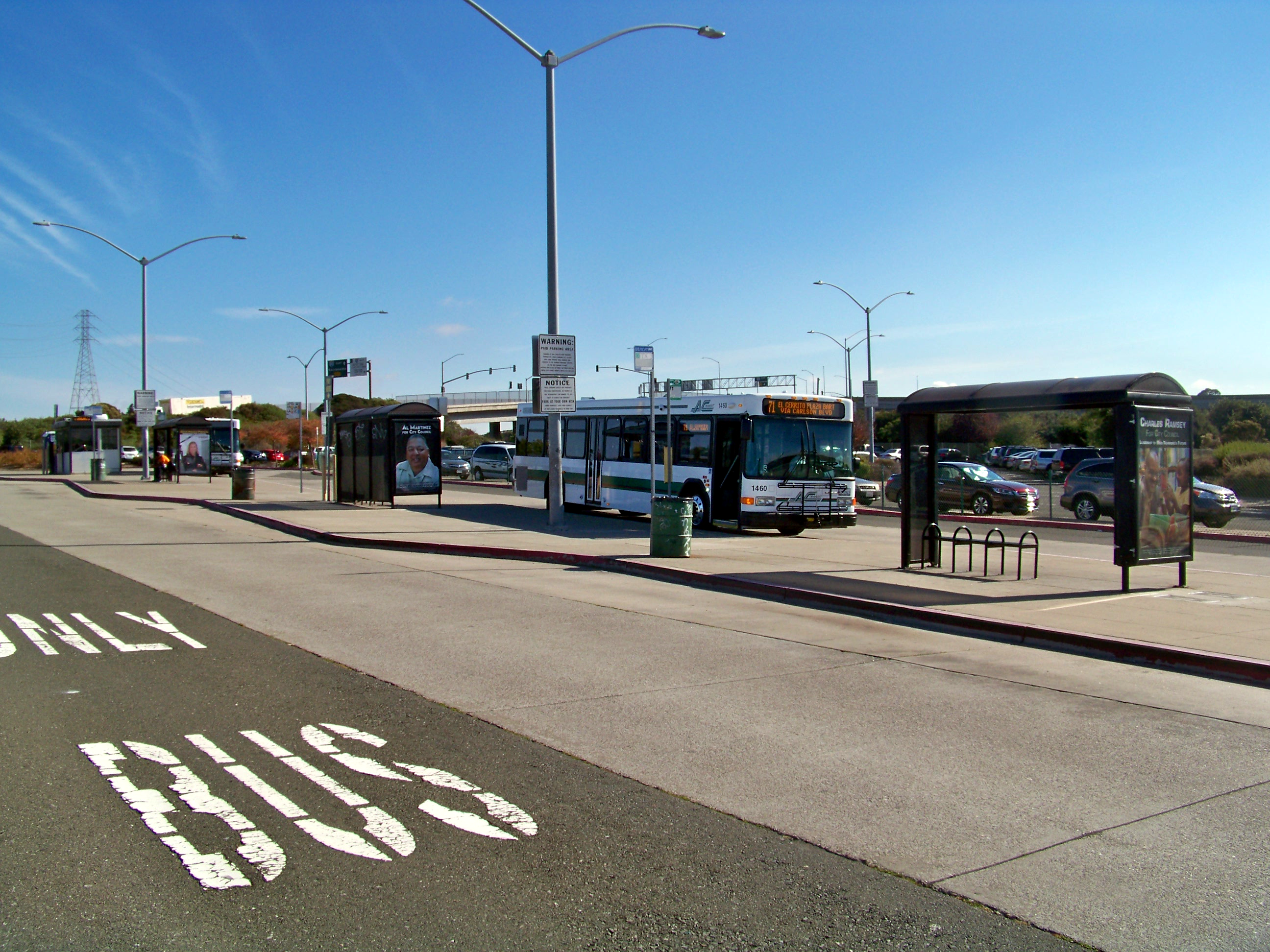

== Bus service ==
The following bus services stop at the center:

AC Transit

- 70 - Appian/Rheem to Richmond BART
- 71 - Carlson/Birmingham Drive to El Cerrito Plaza BART
- 76 - Market/Cutting to El Cerrito del Norte BART
- 376 - North Richmond (Nighttime only)
- LA - Hilltop to San Francisco (commute trips only)

WestCAT

- 16 - Pinole
- 17 - Bayview
- 18 - Tara Hills
- 19 - Hilltop/Hercules (Saturday service only)
- 30Z - Richmond Parkway - Martinez Amtrak Station half of trips are interlines with JPX.
- JPX - Del Norte BART-Hercules via Pinole Valley Road (some buses continue as/from Route 30Z to Martinez)
- JR - Del Norte BART-Hercules via Richmond Parkway & Blume Drive

== Transit Village ==
As reported in 2006 by the East Bay Express, an East Bay newspaper, there were plans to build a transit village at or adjacent to the site. The purpose of the village is to promote smart growth and encourage transit use. It is modeled after the Fruitvale Model, specifically the Fruitvale Transit Village located at the Fruitvale BART station in Oakland, California. Similar projects can be found surrounding BART and Caltrain stations, regional ferry terminals, Park & Ride lots, and Transit Centers, all aimed at reducing sprawl and traffic.

== Planning ==
In 2016 an ultra light rail service was proposed and supported by the Richmond City Council to connect the center with the city's waterfront (Marina Bay). In 2017 the Metropolitan Transportation Commission mulled expanded parking here to address projected double digit traffic growth in the area through 2040.

It has also been studied as a potential location for a future BART station extension along the Orange Line (BART).
