= WestCAT =

Public transportation service in Contra Costa County, California

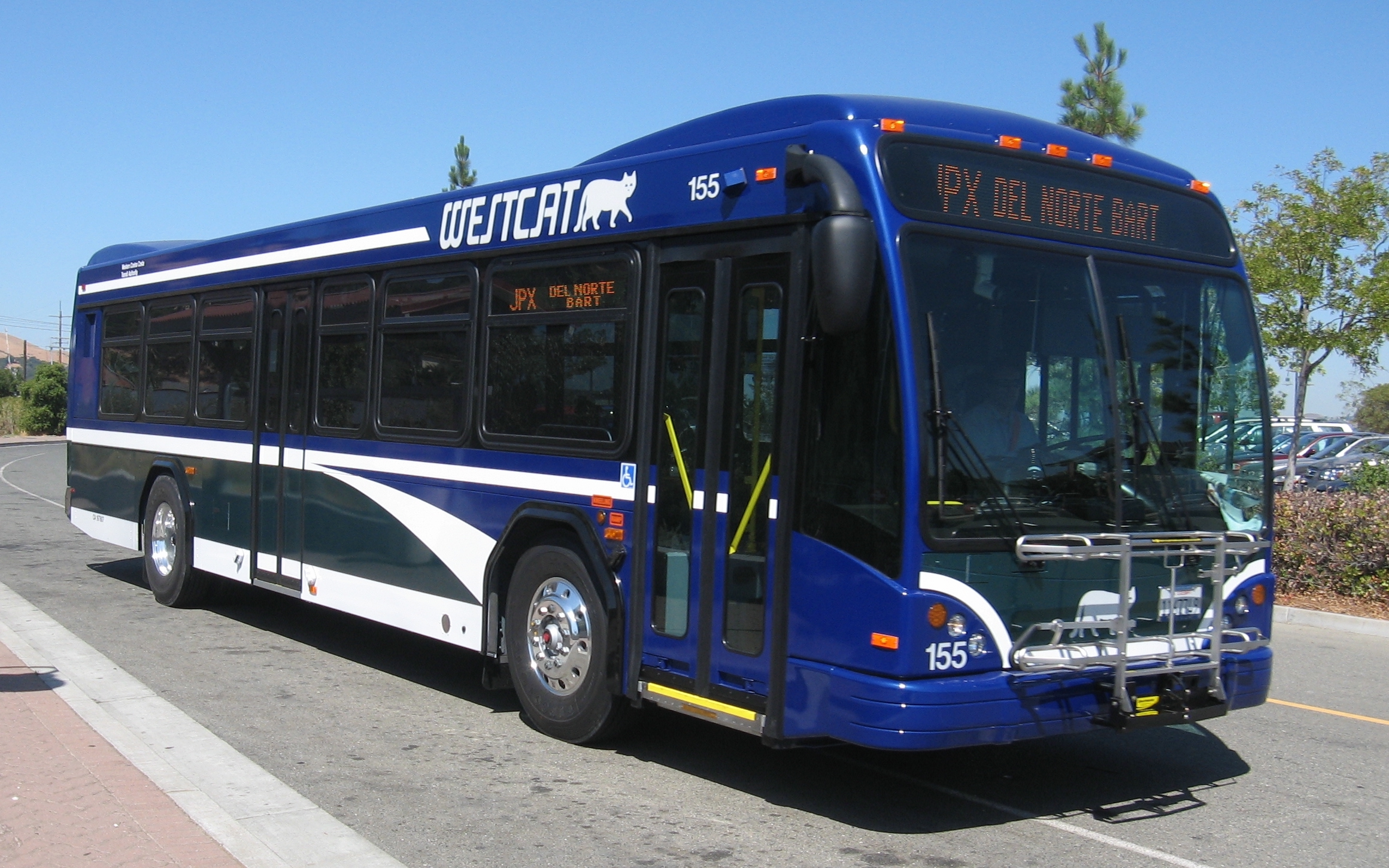
- WestCAT branded Gillig Low-Floor BRT traveling along the JPX route
- Parent: Western Contra Costa Transit Authority
- Founded: 1977
- Headquarters: 601 Walter Ave, Pinole
- Service area: Contra Costa County, California
- Service type: transit bus, express bus, paratransit
- Routes: 14
- Stops: 300
- Fleet: 57
- Daily ridership: 4,944
- Fuel type: Diesel, Gasoline, & Hybrid Electric
- Operator: MV Transportation
- Website: westcat.org

WestCAT is a public transportation service in western Contra Costa County (north of Alameda County). It is a service of the Western Contra Costa Transit Authority. Contra Costa County has four public bus transportation services, divided geographically into western (WestCAT), central (County Connection), and eastern (Tri Delta Transit) territories. Bayshore cities and communities along the western edge of Contra Costa and Alameda counties are served by the bi-county AC Transit, which is headquartered in Oakland, California.

== History and governance ==
The Western Contra Costa Transit Authority was established in August 1977 as a Joint Exercise of Powers Agreement between Contra Costa County and the cities of Hercules and Pinole. It was created with the purpose of owning, operating and administering a public transportation system serving the area between the Richmond/El Sobrante border to the west and the Carquinez Bridge to the east. The service territory covers approximately 20 sq mi (52 km^{2}).

WestCAT is governed by a 7-member Board of Directors and supported by professional staff of seven. The two cities of Pinole and Hercules are each represented by two board members, while the unincorporated communities of Crockett, Rodeo, and Montalvin Manor each have one representative, appointed by the Contra Costa Board of Supervisors.

Since 1978, WestCAT has contracted a private operator to provide bus operation and supervision services. Initially, three fixed routes were provided until September 1979, when all operations were switched to dial-a-ride. Fixed routes were reintroduced in July 1987. In 2013, the contract for fixed route and dial-a-ride services was awarded to MV Transportation.

== Fleet ==
WestCAT's fleet started out with shuttle vans, and then used cutaway van chassis upfitted as minibuses by ElDorado National, Thomas Built Buses, and Starcraft.

As of July 2024, WestCAT local, regional, and express fixed routes use 35- and 40-foot Gillig Low Floor transit buses. WestCAT also uses 45-foot Motor Coach Industries D4500 and Prevost X3-45 over-the-road coaches and 43-foot Alexander Dennis Enviro500 double-decker buses for the LYNX Transbay service. For on-demand Dial-A-Ride service, WestCAT uses Ford E-450 Paratransit cutaway vans and Toyota Camry hybrid electric sedans.

WestCAT published plans in 2023 to convert to a zero-emissions fleet by 2040. Starting in 2027, WestCAT will replace vehicles in its revenue fleet which reach their end of life on a one-for-one basis with hydrogen fuel cell electric vehicles, based on service distances and terrain. Although the current replacement plan does not include battery electric buses, these may be selected as the technology improves.

== Fixed-route service ==
As of September 2013, WestCAT provides a network of local and express bus routes throughout western Contra Costa County. In addition, WestCAT operates regional service between Martinez (Route 30Z) and the Hercules Transit Center and between the Hercules Transit Center and Contra Costa College (Route C3).

The (Local) routes are 10, 11, 12, 15, 16, 17, 18, and 19.

Express routes include JX, JL/JR (referred to as the "J" by most riders, the "L" designates via Lakeside Drive, and the "R" designates via Richmond Parkway), JPX (serves Pinole Valley residents wanting to go to the Hercules Transit Center or BART). These routes previously were provided by BART as "BART Express" bus service through a contracted bus operator; WestCAT assumed operations in 1998.

WestCAT also operates LYNX transbay service between the Hercules Transit Center and the Salesforce Transit Center in San Francisco with stops in the Rodeo Park and Ride located on Willow Avenue, North Shore Business Park near Bio-Rad, the Victoria by the Bay neighborhood in Hercules and the Hercules Transit Center. From the Hercules Transit Center the line then goes nonstop to San Francisco via the High Occupancy Vehicle (HOV) lanes on I-80. WestCAT currently offers free Wi-Fi service on the LYNX line.

Major transfer points for WestCAT routes connecting with other local transit agencies include:

- Hercules Transit Center in Hercules
- Hilltop Mall Shopping Center in Richmond
- Richmond Parkway Transit Center in Richmond
- El Cerrito del Norte BART in El Cerrito
- Martinez Amtrak Station in Martinez
- Salesforce Transit Center in San Francisco

=== Routes ===
WestCAT fixed routes
Route Number	Direction	Terminals		Days of Operation			Notes
Route Number	Direction	North/East Terminal	South/West Terminal	Weekday	Saturday	Sunday / Holiday	Notes
Local Routes (Note: Local routes are mostly operated as loops which use the Hercules Transit Center as a hub.)
10	Loop	Hercules Transit Center - Turquoise		Yes	No		
11	Loop	Hercules Transit Center - Crockett		Yes		No	
12	Loop	Hercules Transit Center - Mandalay/Bonaire		Yes	No		
15	Loop	Hercules Transit Center - Viewpointe Blvd		Yes	No		
16	Loop	Richmond Parkway Transit Center - Wright Ave/Doidge Ave		Yes	No		
19	Loop	Hercules Transit Center - Hilltop Mall Shopping Center		No	Yes	No	[19]
Regional Routes (Note: Regional routes are operated east/west to and from the Hercules Transit Center)
30Z	East-West	Martinez Amtrak	Hercules Transit Center	Yes	No		[30Z]
C3	East-West	Hercules Transit Center	Contra Costa College	Yes	No		
Express Routes (Note: Express routes are operated as feeder routes to BART, running north/south between the Hercules Transit Center and El Cerrito Del Norte BART station)
J (JR/JL)	North-South	Hercules Transit Center; Weekdays; Willow/Viewpointe; Weekdays after 8pm & Weekends	El Cerrito del Norte BART	Yes			[J]
JX	North-South	Hercules Transit Center	El Cerrito del Norte BART	Yes (Note: Does not operate mid-day)	No		
JPX	North-South	Hercules Transit Center	El Cerrito del Norte BART	Yes	No		[JPX]
Transbay Routes (Note: The Lynx Transbay route operates from Hercules Transit Center to the Salesforce Transit Center in San Francisco)
Lynx	North-South	Willow Avenue; Commute trips Hercules Transit Center; Non-commute trips	Salesforce Transit Center (San Francisco)	Yes	No	Limited	[Lynx]

WestCAT discontinued fixed routes
Route Number	Direction	Terminals		Days of Operation			Notes
Route Number	Direction	North/East Terminal	South/West Terminal	Weekday	Saturday	Sunday / Holiday	Notes
17	Loop	Richmond Parkway Transit Center - Cypress/Broadmore		Yes	No		
18	Loop	Richmond Parkway Transit Center - Tara Hills		Yes	No		
705	North-South	MacArthur BART	Temporary Transbay Terminal	Yes	No		[Early Bird]
708	North-South	El Cerrito del Norte BART	19th Street Oakland BART	Yes	No		[Early Bird]

- [JPX] Richmond Parkway Transit Center service only during midday from 9:40am to 2:30pm, route also serves Hercules Transit Center.
- [J] JR Via Richmond Parkway and Blume Drive and JL Via Lakeside Drive.
- [Lynx] Route serves Hercules Transit Center, and most peak period services also serve Bio-Rad, all terminating at Victoria By The Bay. Also operates midday (non-commute) trips between San Francisco and Hercules Transit Center, and it does not serve Bio-Rad or Victoria By The Bay.
- [Early Bird] These routes were part of the BART Early Bird Express service, which provides a limited number of weekday bus trips in the early morning before regular BART rail operations begin. These routes were discontinued by 2024.

== Service Area ==
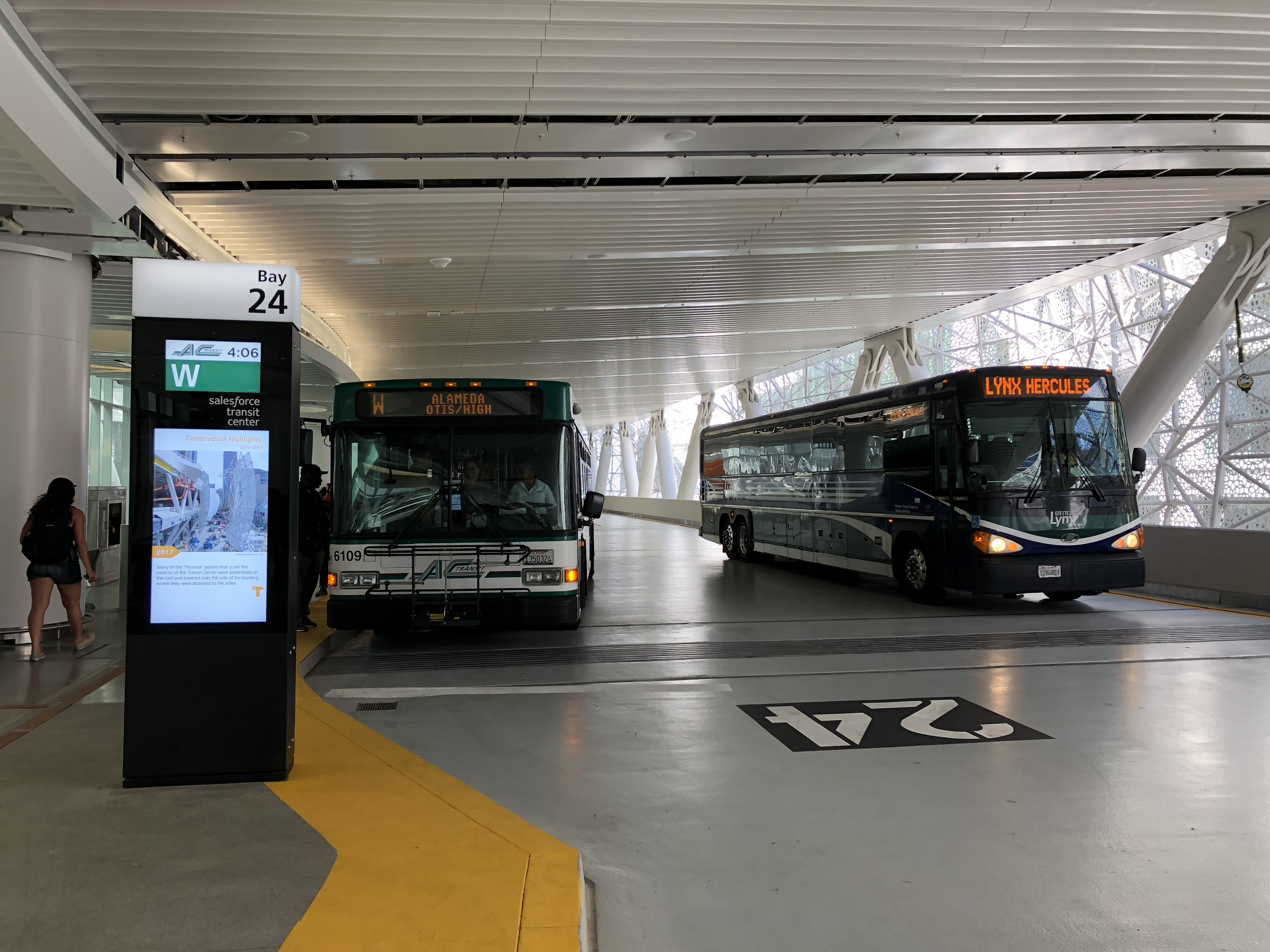
A WestCAT Lynx fixed route bus, alongside an AC Transit bus, at the Salesforce Transit Center in San Francisco.

WestCAT provides service to the communities of:

- Bayview
- Crockett
- El Cerrito
- Hercules
- Martinez
- Montalvin Manor
- Pinole
- Port Costa
- Richmond
- Rodeo
- San Francisco
- San Pablo
- Tara Hills

The local transportation demand management organization 511 Contra Costa also provides information for intermodal transfers throughout Contra Costa County, and works closely with WestCAT to help transit users make regional connections beyond their immediate service area.
