= Fairmede-Hilltop, Richmond, California =

Coordinates: 37.97316°N 122.3307°W

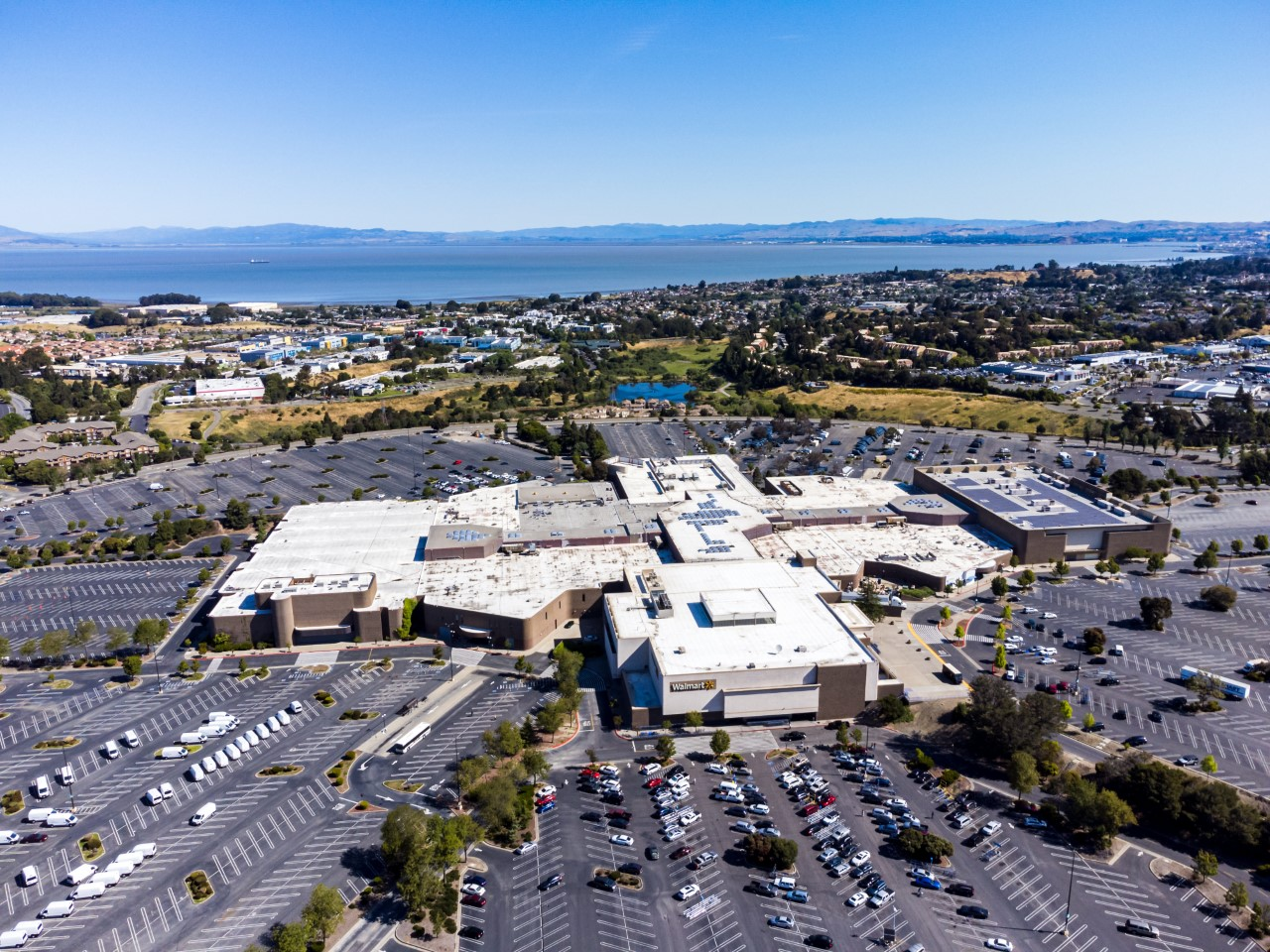
Aerial view of the Hilltop District and the mall.

Hilltop District, more commonly known simply as Hilltop, is a neighborhood located in the northeastern area of Richmond, California.

== Overview ==
It forms the bulk of the retail commercial sector which is anchored by Hilltop Mall. This shopping center, like many around the country, killed downtown after opening in the 1970s. The area has become a booming bedroom community since a high increase in new housing being built in the desirable neighborhood. This area is of interest due to its proximity to job centers in Oakland and San Francisco, its relative adjacency compared to other suburbs, and affordability. Many single family attached and detached homes as well as condos and apartment developments have been added, along with many new shops and strip malls since the late 1990s.

== Transportation ==
Geographically the area enjoys excellent views of the San Pablo Bay due to its medium elevation. It features the Mall, a multiplex movie theatre, regional commuter bus hub (Richmond Parkway Transit Center) and proximity to State Route 4, Interstate 80, and the Richmond Parkway. The area is served by express WestCAT buses to the El Cerrito del Norte BART station and local service connecting Hilltop with El Sobrante, central Richmond, San Pablo, Oakland, and San Francisco. Extending BART here has been established as a high priority.

== Stolen sculpture ==
The Hilltop Retail Plaza once featured a 12-foot (3.7m) statue called "Sold" christened in 1978; however it mysteriously disappeared in 1988 leading to a 2 million dollar lawsuit.
