= Martinez station =

Train station in Martinez, California, US

Martinez, CA
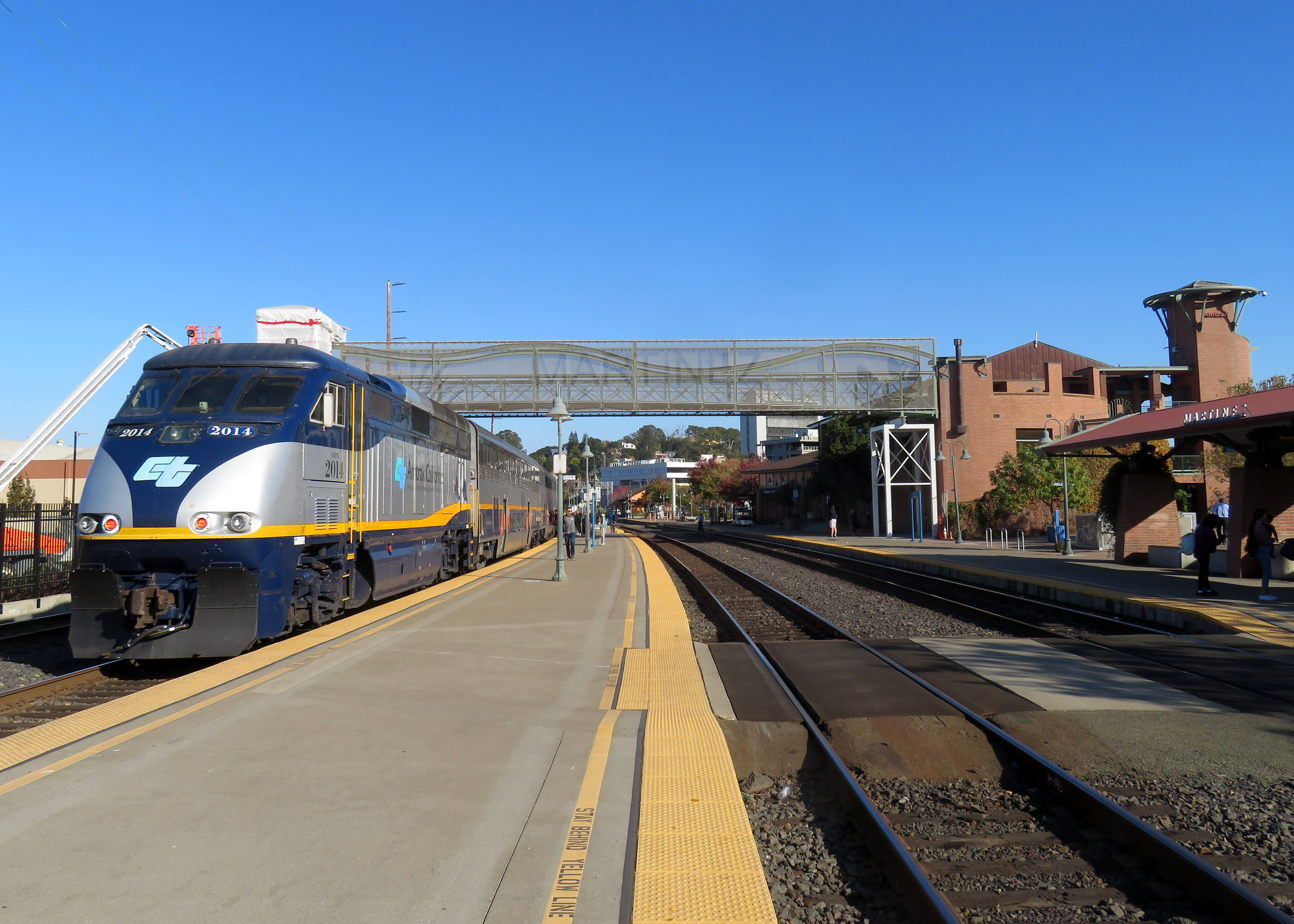
- A northbound Capitol Corridor train at Martinez in 2019

General information
- Location: 601 Marina Vista Avenue; Martinez, California; United States
- Coordinates: 38.019292°N 122.138754°W
- Owner: City of Martinez
- Line: UP Martinez Subdivision
- Platforms: 1 side platform, 1 island platform
- Tracks: 4
- Connections: Amtrak Thruway: 7; County Connection: 16, 18, 19, 28, 98X, 99X, 316; Tri Delta Transit: 200X; WestCAT: 30Z

Construction
- Parking: 136 spaces (main lot), 175 spaces (overflow lot), free with rail ticket
- Cycle facilities: Yes
- Accessible: Yes

Other information
- Status: Staffed, checked baggage service available
- Station code: Amtrak: MTZ

History
- Opened: September 22, 1877
- Rebuilt: September 12, 2001

Passengers
- FY 2025: 267,797 (Amtrak)

Services
Preceding station	Amtrak	Following station
Richmond toward Emeryville	California Zephyr	Davis toward Chicago
Richmond toward San Jose	Capitol Corridor	Suisun–Fairfield toward Auburn
Emeryville toward Los Angeles	Coast Starlight	Davis toward Seattle
Richmond toward Oakland	Gold Runner	Antioch–Pittsburg toward Bakersfield
Former services
Preceding station	Amtrak	Following station
Richmond toward Los Angeles	Spirit of California 1981–1983	Suisun-Fairfield toward Sacramento
Preceding station	Southern Pacific Railroad	Following station
Port Costa toward Oakland Pier	Shasta Route	Benicia Junction toward Portland
Port Costa toward Oakland Pier	Overland Route	Benicia Junction toward Ogden
Port Costa toward Oakland Pier	San Joaquin Valley Line	Bay Point toward Los Angeles
Port Costa toward Oakland	San Joaquin Daylight	Pittsburg toward Los Angeles
Location

Martinez station is an Amtrak passenger train station in Martinez, California, United States. Located at the west end of downtown Martinez, the station has one side platform and one island platform, which serve three of the four tracks of the Union Pacific Railroad Martinez Subdivision. It is served by the daily California Zephyr and Coast Starlight long-distance trains, five daily round trips of the Gold Runner corridor service, and fifteen daily round trips (eleven on weekends) of the Capitol Corridor service. Martinez is also served by Amtrak Thruway buses plus County Connection, Tri-Delta Transit, and WestCAT local buses.

== History ==
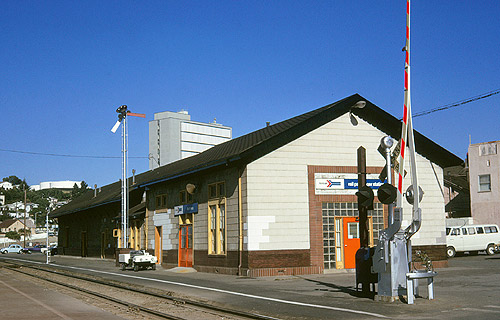
The 1877-built station in 1974

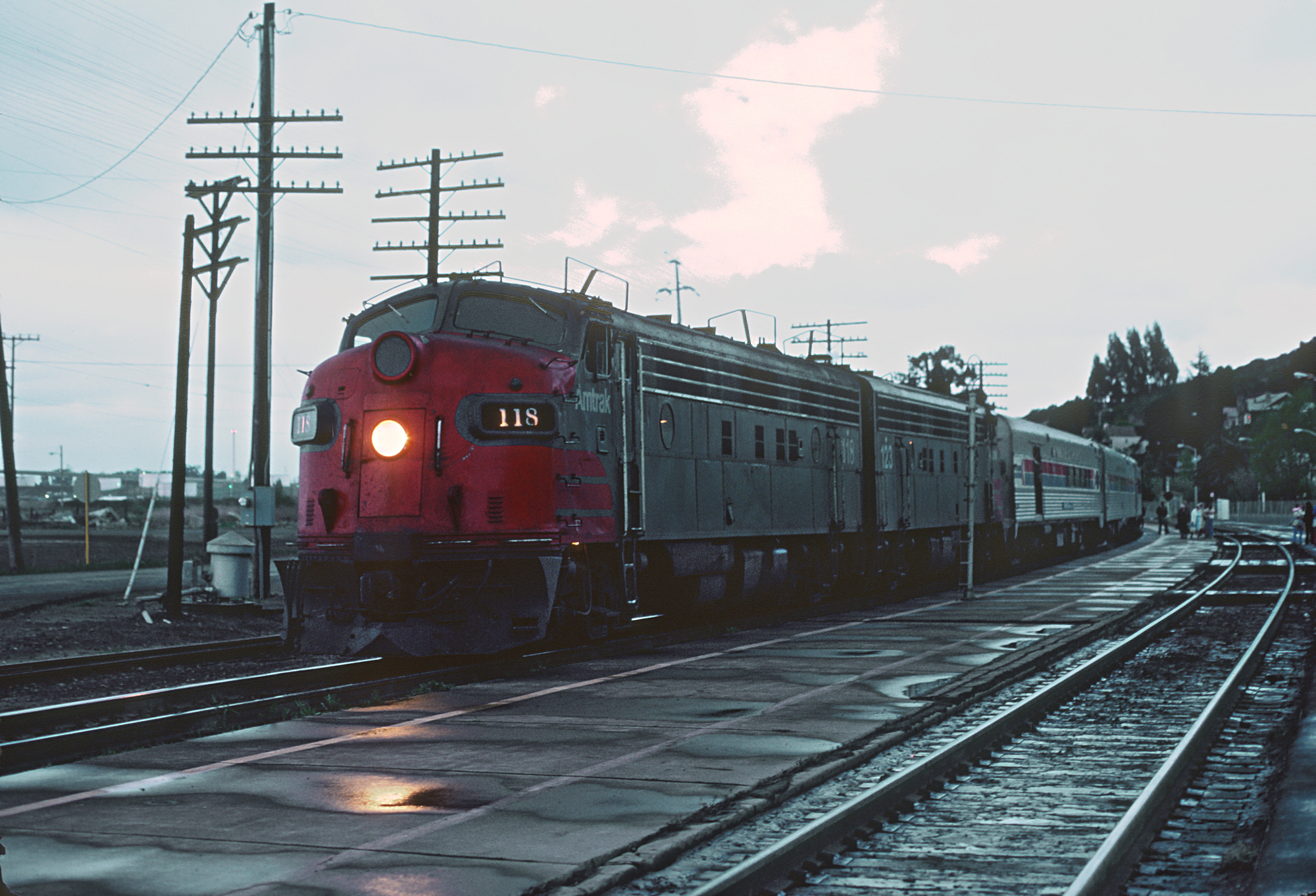
The San Joaquin at Martinez in 1976

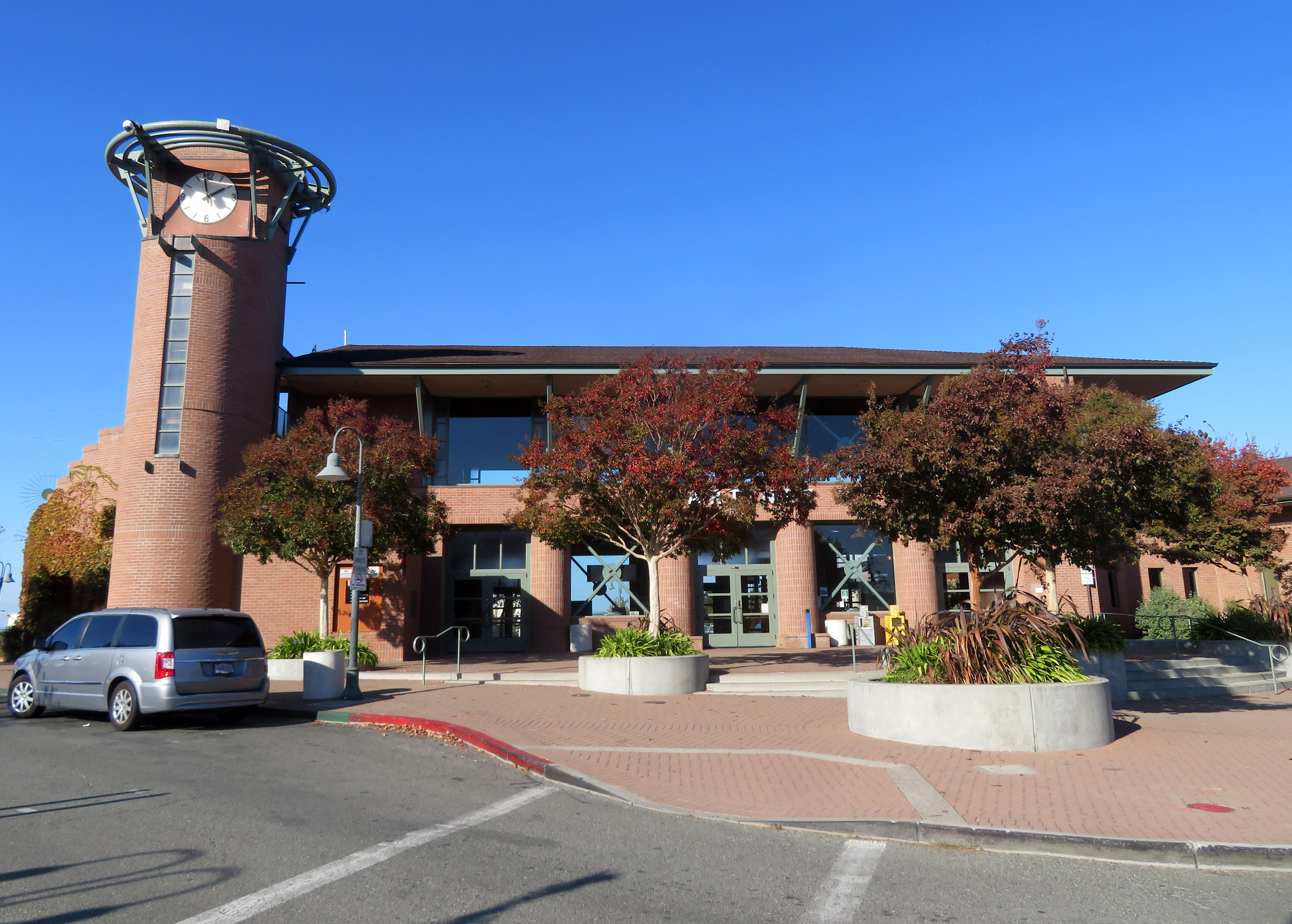
The 2001-built station in 2019

In early 1877, the Central Pacific Railroad (CPRR) began construction of two lines meeting at Martinez. The Northern Railway subsidiary built along the coast from Oakland to Martinez, while the San Pablo-Tulare Railway Company followed an inland route from Martinez to Tracy. A passenger station and freight house were built in Martinez east of Ferry Street, along with an engine house and turntable. The first train from Oakland to Martinez ran on September 22, 1877, with regular scheduled service beginning the next January. In August 1878, the line was completed to Tracy, where it met the First transcontinental railroad.

Transcontinental service was rerouted over the new route via Martinez on September 8, 1878. On December 6, 1879, the CPRR opened a new line from Benicia to Fairfield, where it connected with the California Pacific Railroad to Sacramento. A train ferry was operated between Benicia and Port Costa; Martinez was cut off from transcontinental service. The Southern Pacific Railroad (SP) leased the CPRR in 1885. On June 7, 1891, the SP opened its San Ramon Branch from Avon (just east of Martinez) to San Ramon; it was later extended to Pleasanton. The Atchison, Topeka and Santa Fe Railway opened a line through the south part of Martinez in 1899, with a station at John Strentzel's fruit ranch. The station, later named Muir, was never heavily used for passenger service and was closed around the 1940s.

On November 10, 1930, the SP opened the Benicia-Martinez Railroad Drawbridge east of Martinez, replacing the train ferry and adding Martinez to the Oakland–Sacramento mainline. Passenger service on the San Ramon Branch ended in 1931. The second story on the east end of the station was removed in 1942. Local service between Martinez and Tracy ended in the early 1950s, and between Oakland and Sacramento in 1962. However, Martinez remained a stop on long-distance trains including the Cascade, City of San Francisco, and San Joaquin Daylight.

Amtrak took over most intercity passenger operations in the United States on May 1, 1971. Amtrak did not continue service to the San Joaquin Valley, but Martinez was served by the Seattle–San Diego Coast Daylight/Starlight (later the Coast Starlight) and the Oakland–Chicago City of San Francisco (later the San Francisco Zephyr and California Zephyr). The Oakland–Bakersfield San Joaquin began service on March 5, 1974, with a stop at Martinez. The station was renovated in 1983.

The San Jose–Sacramento Capitols (later Capitol Corridor) began on December 12, 1991. As service increased on the new route, the old Martinez station was inadequate for the increased ridership. In 1994, the city acquired a former rail yard site west of Ferry Street. The first phase of the station project – construction of the parking lot, replacement of the Alhambra Creek railroad bridge, and addition of two tracks through the station – was completed in 1997. The new $31 million station opened on September 22, 2001. The city acquired the vacated old station that year; it was used as a temporary library building, and may be converted into a museum.

In 2008, the city acquired an industrial parcel north of the tracks to serve as an additional parking lot. The city originally planned to construct a bridge over the tracks to the new lot and the shoreline park areas, as Ferry Street is frequently blocked by trains, but it proved too costly to construct. The city decided in 2013 to build a less-expensive bridge across Alhambra Creek, linking the lot to Berrellesa Street. That bridge opened in 2016. In 2018, the city began construction on the final part of the station project: a footbridge connecting the station building to the new lot. The 110-foot (34 m) span was lifted into place in January 2019.

Modifications to the platforms, restrooms, and ticket counter for accessibility took place in 2021–2023. The project cost $8.5 million.

== Bus connections ==
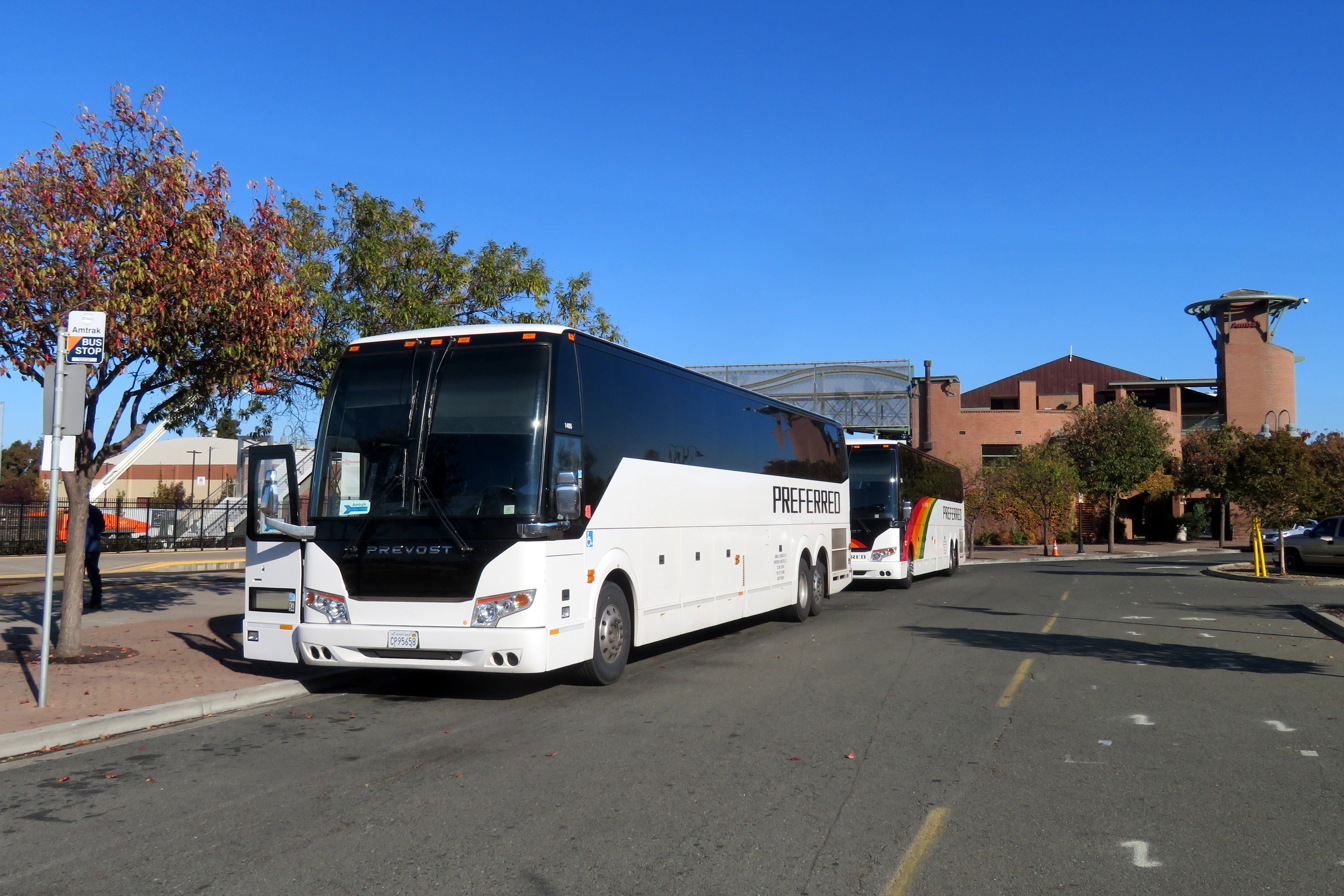
Amtrak Thruway buses at Martinez

Martinez is served by Amtrak Thruway route 7 buses which serve the North Coast region along the Highway 101 corridor, including stops to/from Vallejo, Napa, Petaluma, Santa Rosa, Ukiah, and Eureka, ultimately terminating in Arcata.

The station is also served by several local bus systems:

- County Connection: 16, 18, 19, 28, 98X, 99X, 316
- Tri-Delta Transit: 200X
- WestCat: 30Z to the Hercules Transit Center
