= 2012 Aurora theater shooting =

Mass shooting in Colorado, U.S.

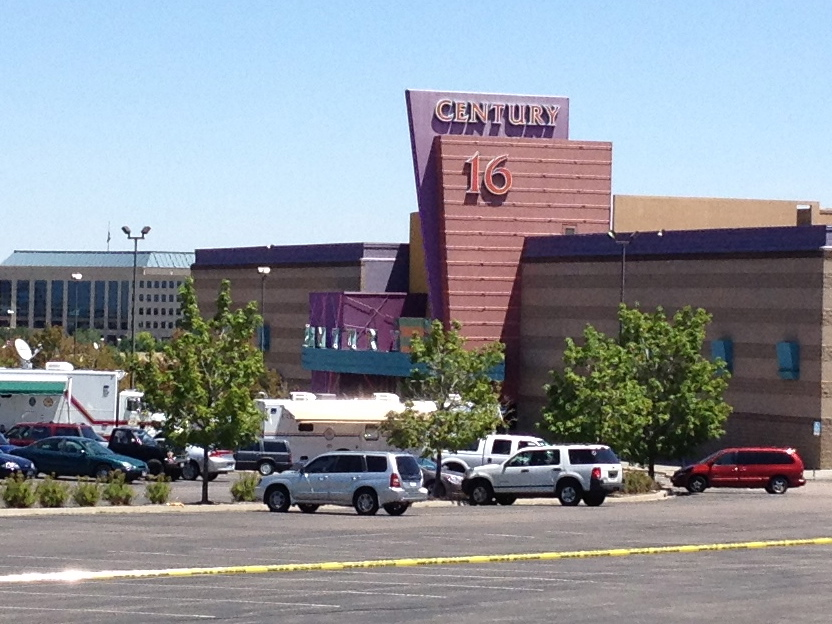
- Century 16 at Mershops Town Center at Aurora

- Bottom left: Map of Colorado with Aurora marked Top: Map of central Aurora; Bottom right: Town Center at Aurora and the location of the Century 16 multiplex
- Location: 39.7059°N 104.8206°W; 14300 East Alameda Avenue, Aurora, Colorado, U.S.
- Date: July 20, 2012; 14 years ago c. 12:38 a.m. – c. 12:45 a.m. (MDT; UTC−06:00)
- Target: Primarily young adults watching The Dark Knight Rises
- Attack type: Mass shooting; mass murder; tear gas attack
- Weapons: Two tear gas grenades; .223 Smith & Wesson M&P15 Sport semi-automatic rifle; Remington 870 Express Tactical 12-gauge shotgun; Two .40 S&W Glock 22 Gen4 handgun (One unused)
- Deaths: 12 (Note: A survivor miscarried a week after the attack. However, the unborn child is not included in the official fatality count.)
- Injuries: 70 (Note: 58 by gunfire, 4 from tear gas, 8 from fleeing accidents)
- Perpetrator: James Holmes
- Motive: Disputed: Achieving infamy (prosecution); Severe mental illness (defense); Undetermined (psychological evaluation)
- Verdict: Guilty on all counts
- Convictions: First-degree murder (24 counts); Attempted first-degree murder (140 counts); Possessing an illegal explosive device
- Sentence: 12 consecutive life sentences without the possibility of parole plus 3,318 years

On July 20, 2012, a mass shooting occurred inside a Mershops Town Center Century 16 movie theater in Aurora, Colorado, United States, during a midnight screening of the film The Dark Knight Rises. 24-year-old James Eagan Holmes set off tear gas grenades and shot into the audience with multiple firearms. Twelve people were killed and 70 others were injured, 58 of them due to gunfire. Holmes' shooting remains the deadliest mass shooting by a lone shooter in Colorado's history.

Holmes was arrested minutes later in his car outside the cinema. Earlier, he had rigged his apartment with homemade explosives and incendiary devices. These were defused by the Arapahoe County Sheriff's Office Bomb Squad a day after the shooting.

Fearing copycat crimes, movie theaters showing the same film across the United States increased their security. Gun sales increased in Colorado, and political debates were generated about gun control in the United States.

Holmes confessed to the shooting but pleaded not guilty by reason of insanity. Arapahoe County prosecutors sought the death penalty. The trial began on April 27, 2015. On July 16 of that year, Holmes was convicted of 24 counts of first-degree murder, 140 counts of attempted first-degree murder, and one count of possessing explosives. On August 7, the jury deadlocked on whether to impose the death penalty. On August 26, Holmes was given 12 life sentences, one for every person he killed; he also received 3,318 years for the attempted murders of those he wounded and for rigging his apartment with explosives.

The shooting had a major impact on film exhibition. Several theater chains implemented restrictions on the wearing of costumes, and the incident precipitated the end of traditional midnight showings for blockbusters, in favor of earlier Thursday previews.

== Events ==
=== Shooting ===
The shooting occurred in Theater 9 at the Century 16 multiplex (operated by Cinemark Theatres), located in the Town Center at Aurora shopping mall at 14300 E. Alameda Avenue. Police said that Holmes bought a ticket, entered the theater, and sat in the front row. About 20 minutes into the film, he left Theater 9 through an emergency exit door beside the movie screen, with direct access to the lightly used parking area at the back of the complex, while propping the door slightly open with a plastic tablecloth holder. There were about 400 people inside Theater 9.

Holmes went to his car (which he had parked near the exit door), changed into protective clothing, and retrieved his guns. About 30 minutes into the movie, police say, around 12:30 a.m., he reentered the theater through the exit door. Holmes was dressed in black and wore a gas mask, a load-bearing vest, a ballistic helmet, bullet-resistant leggings, a bullet-resistant throat protector, a groin protector, and tactical gloves. He was listening to a techno radio station, which was playing the song "Becoming Insane" by Infected Mushroom, through a set of headphones so that he could not hear anything from people in the theater. Initially, few in the audience considered Holmes to be a threat. Some witnesses thought he was wearing a costume, like other audience members who had dressed up for the screening. Some believed he was playing a prank, while others thought he was part of a special effects setup for the film's premiere, or a publicity stunt by the studio or theater management.

Holmes reportedly threw one canister towards the left side of the theatre, emitting a gas or smoke, that partially obscured the audience members' vision, made their throats and skin itch, and caused eye irritation. He fired a 12-gauge Remington 870 Express Tactical shotgun, first at the ceiling and then at the audience. He also fired a Smith & Wesson M&P15 semi-automatic rifle with a 100-round drum magazine, which eventually malfunctioned. Finally, he fired a .40-caliber Glock 22 Gen4 handgun. He shot first to the back of the room, and then toward people in the aisles. A bullet passed through the wall and hit three people in adjacent theater 8, which was screening the same film. Witnesses said the multiplex's fire alarm system began sounding soon after the attack began, and staff told people in Theater 8 to evacuate.

Holmes fired 76 shots in the theater: 6 from the shotgun, 65 from the semi-automatic rifle, and 5 from the .40-caliber handgun.

=== Police response ===
The first phone calls to emergency services via 9-1-1 were made around midnight, prior to his attack, as can be heard in the opening statements of the prosecution, as well as the recorded transcript of his interview with the FBI. At 12:39 a.m., after he began shooting, other victims began to call the police who arrived within 90 seconds and found three .40-caliber handgun magazines, a shotgun, and a large drum magazine on the floor of the theater. Some people reported the shooting via Twitter or text messaging rather than calling the police; officers were already at the theater by the time that the tweets were sent. Ambulances were hindered by chaos and congestion in the parking lot, and they were unable to reach the back of the complex where police had pulled the injured out through the emergency exit doors of Theatre 9. Sgt. Stephen Redfearn, one of the first police officers to arrive on the scene, sent victims to area hospitals in squad cars.

At about 12:45 a.m., police officer Jason Oviatt apprehended Holmes behind the cinema, next to his car, without resistance. Because of his tactical clothing, Holmes was at first mistaken for another police officer. He was described as being calm and "disconnected" during his arrest. Two federal officials said that Holmes had dyed his hair red and called himself "The Joker", although authorities later declined to confirm this. Three days later, at his first court appearance in Centennial, Colorado, Holmes's hair appeared reddish-orange. Later, the Colorado district attorney who prosecuted Holmes said he never called himself the Joker, and blamed the federal officials for the rumor. The officers found several firearms in the theater and inside the shooter's car, including another Glock 22 handgun. Holmes was found carrying a first-aid kit and spike strips, which he later admitted in an interview he had planned to use if police either shot at or chased him.

Following his arrest, Holmes was initially jailed at the Arapahoe County Detention Center, under suicide watch. The police interviewed more than 200 witnesses of the shooting. Speaking on behalf of himself and FBI agent James Yacone, who was in charge of the investigation, Aurora Police Chief Dan Oates said he was confident that the shooter acted alone.

=== Discovery of explosive devices ===
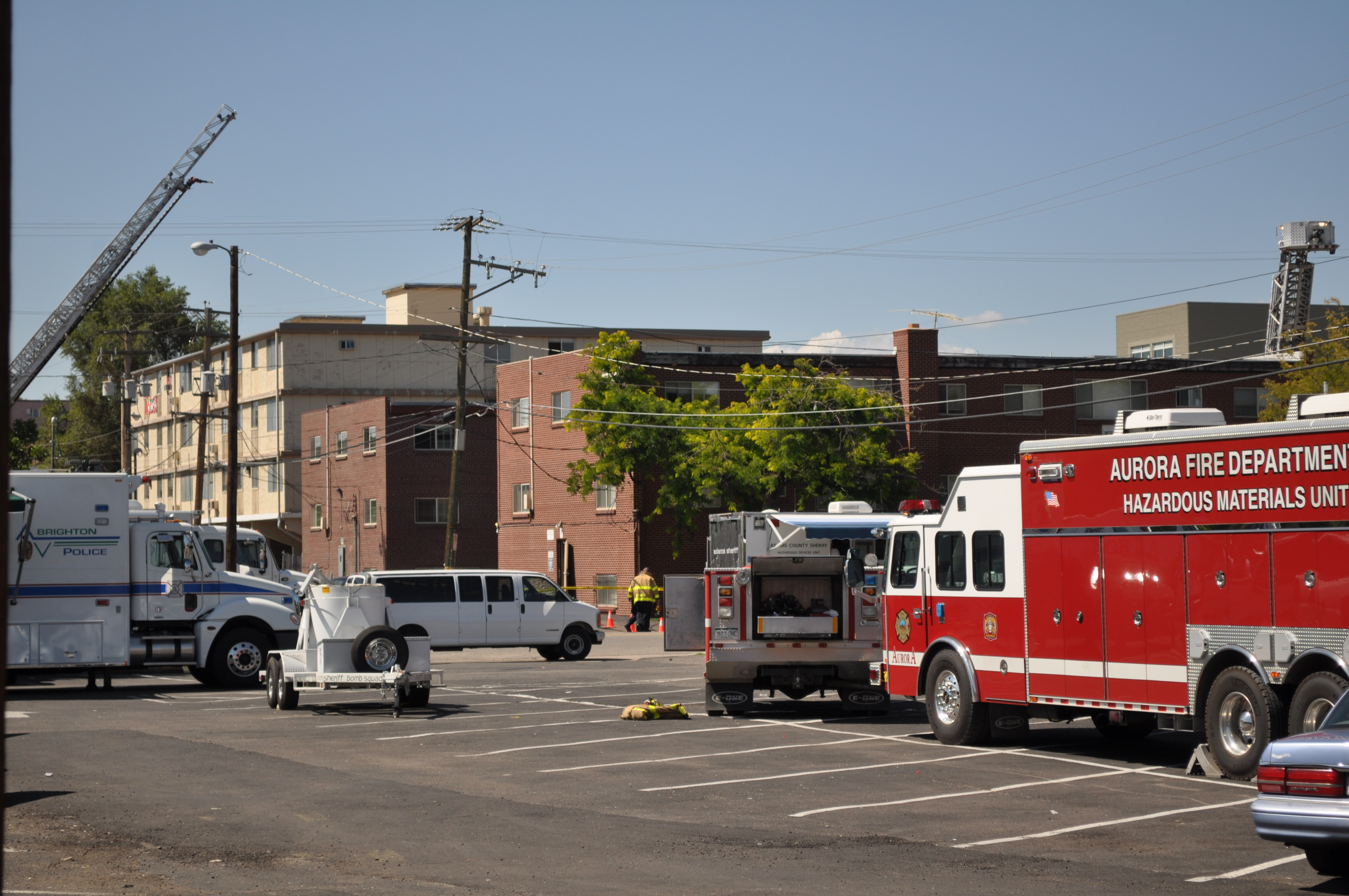
A view of the multi-jurisdictional effort to clear the shooter's apartment of booby traps. The corner of his apartment building is visible between the white van and the fire truck. Note the white-painted bomb-disposal trailer.

When apprehended, Holmes told the police that he had booby-trapped his apartment with explosive devices. Police evacuated five buildings surrounding his Aurora residence, which was about 5 mi (8 km) north of the cinema. Holmes' apartment complex is limited to University of Colorado Medical Center students, patients, and employees. One day after the shooting, officials disarmed an explosive device that was wired to the apartment's front door, allowing a remote-controlled robot to enter and disable other explosives. The apartment held more than 30 homemade grenades, wired to a control box in the kitchen and filled with at least 30 US gal (110 L) of gasoline.

Neighbors reported loud music from the apartment around midnight on the night of the massacre, and one went to his door to tell him she was calling the police; she said the door seemed to be unlocked, but she chose not to open it.

A police official said a Batman mask was found in the apartment. On July 23, police finished collecting evidence from the apartment. Two days later, residents were allowed to return to the four surrounding buildings, and six days later, residents were allowed to move back into the formerly booby-trapped building.

== Casualties ==
Twelve fatalities were reported along with 70 injuries. 58 were hit by bullets, and were reported by mainstream news as the most victims of any mass shooting in United States history. This figure was not surpassed until the 2016 Orlando nightclub shooting, which killed 49 people and injured 58 others for a combined total of 107 casualties. Four people's eyes were irritated by the tear gas grenades, while eight others sustained non-gunshot injuries while fleeing the theater. The massacre was the deadliest shooting in Colorado since the Columbine High School massacre on April 20, 1999.

=== Fatalities ===
Ten victims died at the scene and two more were pronounced dead in local hospitals. An unborn child was also killed. The people murdered were:

- Jonathan Blunk, 26
- Alexander J. Boik, 18
- Jesse Childress, 29
- Gordon Cowden, 51
- Jessica Ghawi (also known as Jessica Redfield), 24
- John Larimer, 27
- Matt McQuinn, 27
- Micayla Medek, 23
- Veronica Moser-Sullivan, 6
- Alex Sullivan, 27
- Alexander C. Teves, 24
- Rebecca Wingo, 32

Ghawi had survived the Eaton Centre shooting in Toronto that occurred a month prior.

Veronica died only two days after the shooting, on Sunday, July 22.

=== Injuries ===
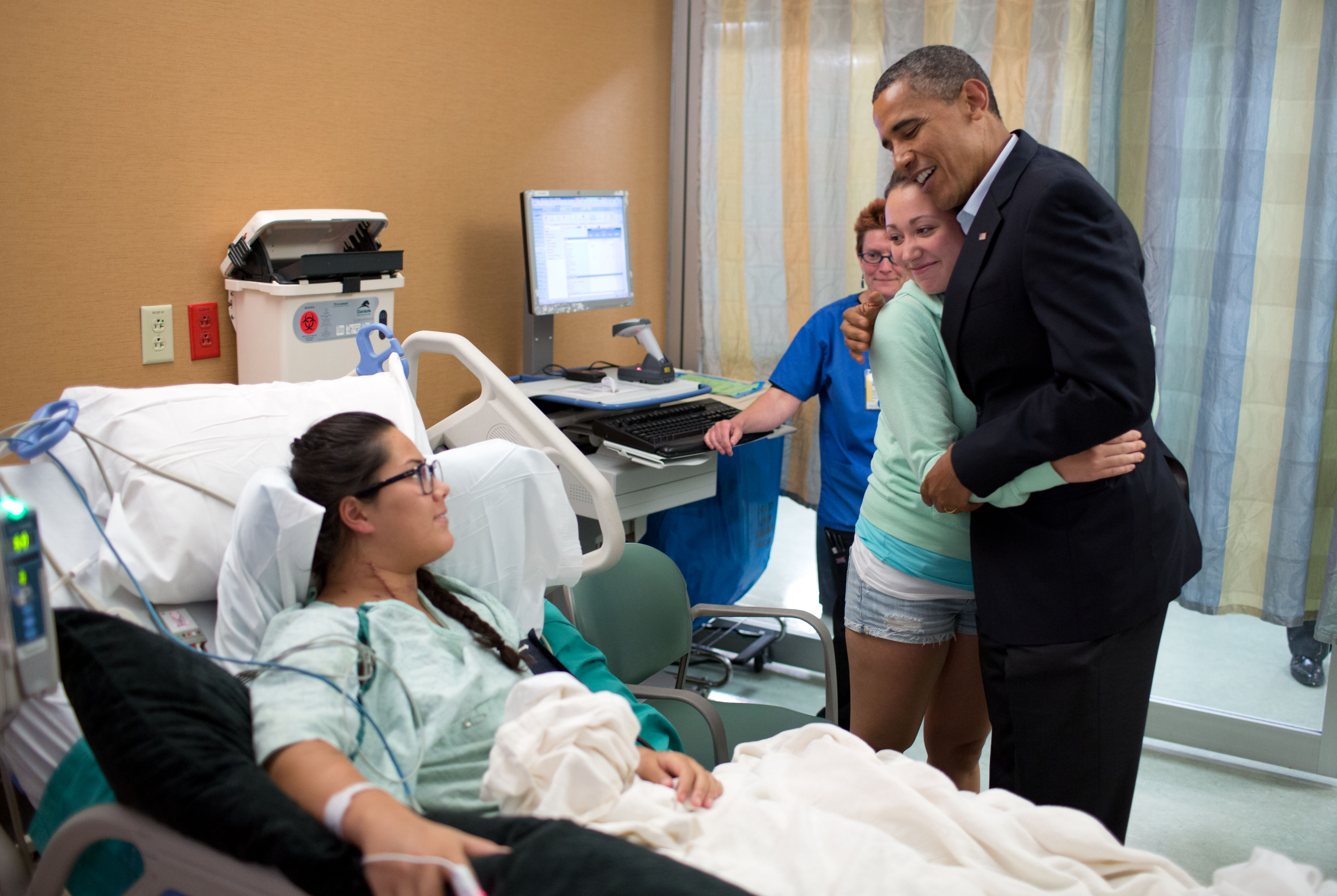
President Barack Obama visiting shooting victims at University of Colorado Hospital on July 22, 2012

The injured were treated at Children's Hospital Colorado, Denver Health Medical Center, The Medical Center of Aurora, Parker Adventist Hospital, Rose Medical Center, Swedish Hospital, and University Hospital. On July 25, three of the five hospitals treating victims announced they would limit medical bills or forgive them entirely.

Ashley Moser, Veronica Moser-Sullivan's mother, suffered critical injuries after being shot three times in the chest, neck, and abdomen. She was rendered a paraplegic due to one of the bullets lodging in her spine. She miscarried a week after the attack.

Caleb Medley, the last victim discharged, left University Hospital on September 12. He had serious brain damage and an injury to his right eye from a shotgun blast to the head and underwent three brain surgeries. He required a feeding tube, had severely impaired movement, and could no longer speak.

Stefan Moton was paralyzed from the chest down after a bullet went through his spine.

The Community First Foundation collected more than $5 million for a fund for victims and their families. In September, victims and their families received surveys asking about their preferences for how collected funds should be distributed, either by dividing it equally among victims or through a needs-assessment process.

On November 16, 2012, the Aurora Victim Relief Fund announced that each family of the dead would receive $220,000.

== Court proceedings ==
Holmes' booking photo was released, and he first appeared in court on July 23, 2012. According to press reports, he seemed dazed and largely unaware of his surroundings.

On July 30, Colorado prosecutors filed formal charges against Holmes, including 24 counts of first-degree murder, 116 counts of attempted first-degree murder and one count of illegal possession of explosives. Two charges were filed for each victim to expand the opportunities for prosecutors to obtain convictions. Colorado State District Court Judge William B. Sylvester, who was the trial judge overseeing the case, placed a gag order on lawyers and law enforcement, sealing the court file and barring the University of Colorado from releasing public records relating to Holmes' year at the school. Media organizations challenged the sealing of the court file.

On August 9, Holmes' attorneys said he is mentally ill and they needed more time to assess the nature of his illness. The disclosure was made at a court hearing in Centennial, Colorado, where news media organizations asked a judge to unseal court documents in the case. Prosecutors alleged on August 24, 2012, that Holmes told a classmate he wanted to kill people four months before the shooting.

A judge ruled on August 30 that a notebook written by Holmes, in which he allegedly described a violent attack, was covered by physician–patient privilege because it was addressed to his psychiatrist. This made it inadmissible as evidence unless Holmes' mental health became an issue in the case. Prosecutors dropped their request for access to the notebook on September 20, 2012.

On January 2, 2013, prosecutors and defense attorneys in the case returned to court in advance of the preliminary hearing, the public's first officially sanctioned look at the evidence, due to the gag order. It began on January 7. Prosecutors offered their case as to why the trial should proceed, and defense lawyers argued that it should not. At the conclusion, Judge Sylvester decided there was enough relevant, admissible evidence to proceed to a trial.

Also on January 7, lawyers for both sides argued whether to admit four unspecified prescription bottles and immunization records investigators had seized from Holmes' apartment when they searched it in July 2012, considering doctor-patient confidentiality laws. The judge ruled in October that prosecutors could keep the items.

On March 27, Holmes' lawyers offered a guilty plea in exchange for prosecutors not seeking the death penalty. On April 1, the prosecution announced it had declined the offer. Arapahoe County district attorney George Brauchler said: "It's my determination and my intention that in this case for James Eagan Holmes justice is death."

Jury selection started on January 20, 2015. It ended on April 15, 2015.

=== Trial ===
On February 27, 2014, Arapahoe County District Court Judge Carlos Samour set the start of Holmes' trial for October 14. The trial was delayed to December 8 upon a defense request for a continuance to further evaluate Holmes' mental condition. On that date, the trial was again postponed, as Holmes' lawyers asked for another continuance to further prepare their case and review the paperwork of evidence.

Jury selection eventually started on January 20, 2015, after a request by Holmes' lawyers for yet another continuance was denied. The juror selection process lasted three months and summoned 9,000 candidates, making it the largest jury summons in U.S. history. On April 15, selection ended, with a total of nineteen women and five men serving. There were concerns about the selection of the jurors, as at least two from the pool of twelve primary jurors, along with twelve alternates, had ties to the 1999 Columbine High School massacre: "Juror No. 535", was the aunt of a Columbine survivor; and "Juror No. 737", was a student there at the time and was also a former friend of the shooters.

The trial began on April 27 with opening arguments by the prosecution explaining that Holmes intentionally went to the movie theater that evening with the deliberate intent to kill as many people as possible in a mass shooting spree. The defense opened their argument by admitting the fact that Holmes was the shooter, but said that he was mentally ill with severe schizophrenia and was never in control of his right mind. Starting on April 28, and over the next few weeks, prosecution testimony included various survivors of the massacre and enumerated the after-effects on the survivors.

On May 26, the notebook Holmes mailed to his psychiatrist hours prior to the shooting was presented as evidence. There had previously been intense debate as to whether the notebook was eligible as evidence and should be admitted, since it detailed Holmes' thoughts. Prosecutors argued the content in Holmes' notebook, which had attack plans, proved the shooting was premeditated, while Holmes' attorneys argued that his writing indicated his mental illness.

On May 27, William Reid, a court-appointed psychiatrist who interviewed Holmes for a total of about 22 hours, testified that Holmes was mentally ill but legally sane. He diagnosed him as having schizotypal personality disorder, which is characterized by constricted behavior and difficulties relating to others. Reid and another doctor evaluated Holmes in December 2013, determining him to be legally sane, and said that his mental illness did not prevent him from forming intent and knowing the consequences of his actions. Holmes had told Reid that he did not target children, hence why he chose a PG-13 film showing, and felt remorse when he learned children were killed. Holmes's attorneys tried to call for a mistrial, saying that the jurors heard an unprompted opinion that complicated the legal standard for judging the sanity of a person, but the judge refused to grant the request.

On May 29, videos of Reid's interviews with Holmes in 2013 were shown to the court. In the videos, Holmes described his social awkwardness and the violent, paranoid thoughts he had been having prior to the massacre. He also stated his belief that he was being followed by federal agents at the time of the massacre and hoped they would apprehend him at the theater before he could act. According to him, he transitioned from suicidal thoughts to homicidal thoughts after becoming depressed from his breakup with his girlfriend. On June 8, a second psychiatrist, Jeffrey Metzner, testified that Holmes was mentally ill but legally sane when he plotted and carried out the shooting, and that he suffered from schizoaffective disorder. He interviewed Holmes for a total of 25 hours.

On June 9, the trial came to a standstill after three jurors were dismissed by the judge for violating orders to refrain from talking about news reports regarding the trial. One of the jurors had begun discussions about sensitive details of the case with the other two jurors outside of the court on at least two occasions. Two days later, Holmes's attorneys requested the dismissal of a fourth juror after her brother-in-law was shot during a robbery the previous day, and other jurors had seen her crying. Judge Carlos Samour responded that he would consider it, and agreed to the motion by dismissing her on June 15. On June 17, a fifth juror was dismissed after Judge Samour was advised that she personally knew a wounded victim of the shooting.

On June 19, the prosecution called as their last witness Ashley Moser, the mother of slain victim Veronica Moser-Sullivan. Moser was critically injured and left paralyzed by the shooting. Afterward, they rested their case.

On July 9, Samour asked Holmes if he would testify in court, and advised him of his right to do so. Holmes chose not to testify.

On July 10, the defense showed two videos of Holmes' behavior in his jail cell. One video showed him running and slamming his head against the wall before sitting down while the other showed him tethered to a bed while naked, attempting to cover his head with a blanket and then a sheet. Afterward, they rested their case.

On July 14, closing statements were made; jury deliberations began on July 15 and continued into July 16.

=== Verdict and sentencing ===
On July 16, after deliberating for over twelve hours, the jurors found Holmes guilty on all twenty-four counts of first-degree murder, 140 counts of attempted first-degree murder, one count of possessing explosives, and a sentence enhancement of a crime of violence. They began deciding his sentence on July 22. The court expected the sentencing phase to last for one month. Holmes declined to make an allocution statement. On July 23, the jury ruled that Holmes acted in a cruel manner, was lying in wait, and ambushed his victims during the shooting, which constituted aggravating factors. The jurors decided that Holmes did not intend to kill children when he opened fire.

On July 27, Holmes's sister testified that her brother became withdrawn from the family after they moved from Salinas to San Diego during his early teenage years. On July 28, Holmes' father pleaded for his son's life, stating that he is severely mentally ill and did not deserve to die, regardless of his crimes. He displayed photos of camping trips and family vacations with Holmes to the jury. On July 30, Holmes' lawyers made a final appeal to the jurors, urging them to consider mental illness in his sentencing, despite their rejection of the insanity defense used in the trial. The appeal for clemency was rejected on August 3, based on mitigating factors such as mental illness not outweighing aggravating factors such as the number of casualties in the massacre.

On August 7, Holmes was sentenced to life in prison without the possibility of parole after jurors failed to unanimously agree on a death sentence. One juror was opposed to sentencing Holmes to death due to his mental health issues, while two other jurors were uncertain. Formal sentencing began on August 24 and ended on August 26. On August 26, Samour formally sentenced Holmes to 12 consecutive life sentences without the possibility of parole for the murder charges, and an additional 3,318 years for the attempted murder and explosives possession charges. In imposing the sentence, Samour stated for the record that it was "the intention of the court that the defendant never sets foot in free society again", and added that "the defendant deserves no sympathy."

== Reactions ==
=== Government ===
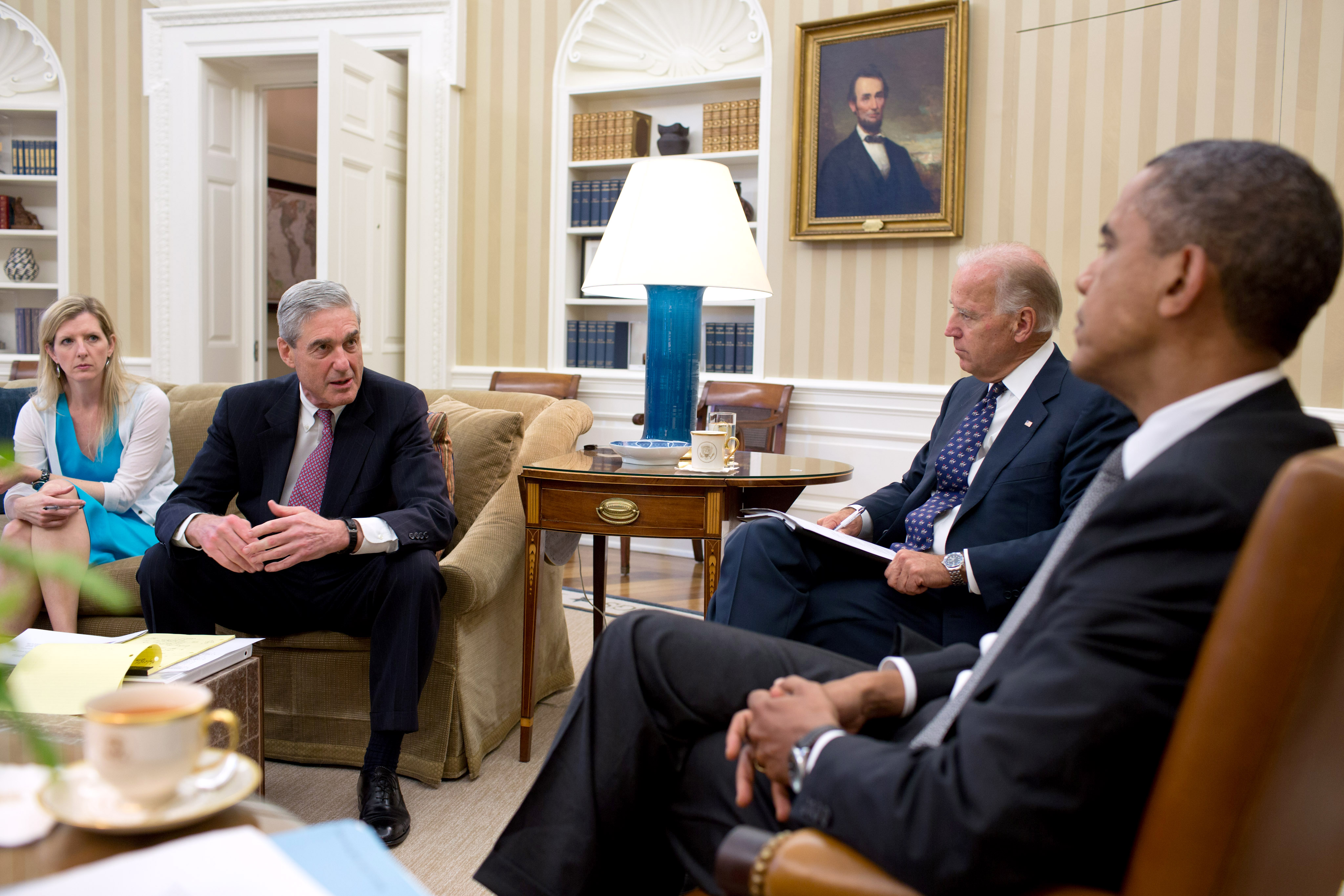
President Obama and Vice President Joe Biden meet with Kathryn Ruemmler, Counsel to the President, and FBI Director Robert Mueller in the Oval Office to discuss the shootings in Aurora, July 20, 2012

The evening after the shooting, a candlelight vigil was held at the site in Aurora. President Barack Obama ordered flags at government buildings flown at half-staff, in tribute to the victims, until July 25. Both Obama's and Mitt Romney's campaigns temporarily suspended television advertising in Colorado for the 2012 presidential election. On July 22, President Obama met with victims and local and state officials and gave a nationally televised speech from Aurora. Many world leaders sent their condolences, including Queen Elizabeth II, French President François Hollande, Israeli Prime Minister Benjamin Netanyahu, Russian President Vladimir Putin, and Pope Benedict XVI.

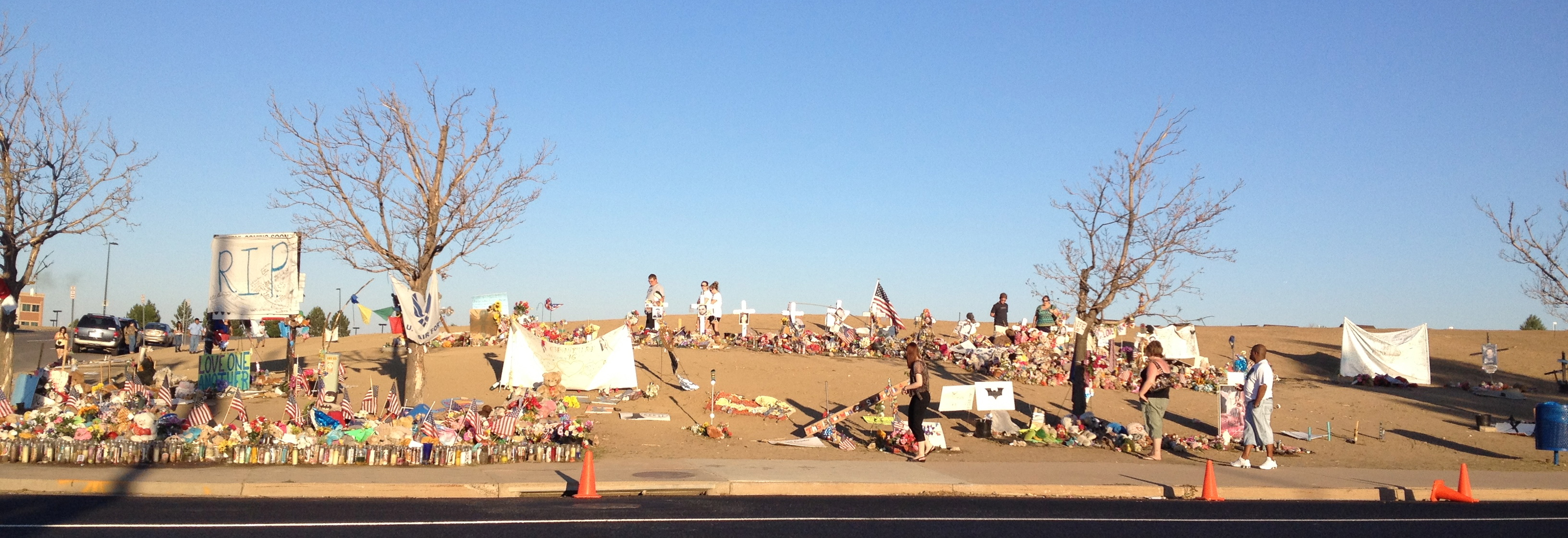
Memorial across the street from the Aurora Century movie theater, in September 2012

=== Entertainment industry ===
I would not presume to know anything about the victims of the shooting but that they were there last night to watch a movie. I believe movies are one of the great American art forms and the shared experience of watching a story unfold on screen is an important and joyful pastime. The movie theatre is my home, and the idea that someone would violate that innocent and hopeful place in such an unbearably savage way is devastating to me. Nothing any of us can say could ever adequately express our feelings for the innocent victims of this appalling crime, but our thoughts are with them and their families.

— Director Christopher Nolan's reaction to the theater shooting in Aurora, Colorado.

Warner Bros., the distributor of The Dark Knight Rises, said it was deeply saddened by the shooting. The studio canceled the film's gala premieres in France, Mexico, and Japan, scaled down its marketing campaign in Finland, and decided not to report box-office figures for the movie until July 23. Some television advertisements for the film were also canceled. Other major film studios joined Warner Bros. in withholding early box-office numbers on July 21. Warner Bros. reportedly made a "substantial" donation to Colorado's Community First Foundation to benefit victims.

Christopher Nolan, the film's director, spoke on behalf of his cast and crew and called the event "savage" and "devastating". Christian Bale, who plays Batman in the film series, privately visited victims on July 24. Members of the Colorado Rockies baseball team also visited victims. Members of the Denver Broncos also called or visited individuals at the hospitals.

Warner Bros. instructed cinemas to stop screening a trailer for the film Gangster Squad, which preceded The Dark Knight Rises screenings in some cities (though not in Aurora), because it contained a scene involving the main characters shooting at a movie theater audience with machine guns. The film's release date was rescheduled to January 2013, and the theater scene was replaced by a new sequence in a different setting.

In the wake of the shooting, DC Comics delayed the release of Batman Incorporated #3, which includes a scene in which a female Leviathan agent brandishes a handgun in a classroom full of children while disguised as a schoolteacher. Warner Bros. Animation reportedly edited the Cartoon Network series Beware the Batman to make the firearms look less realistic.

Hans Zimmer, who composed the soundtrack for The Dark Knight Rises, recorded a choral song entitled "Aurora" in honor of the victims. The song was sold for donations that went to a fund for the victims.

Cinemark agreed to pay any funeral expenses incurred by the deceased victims' families not covered by the Crime Victims' Compensation Fund. Cinemark closed the entire Century Aurora 16 multiplex in the wake of the shooting but reopened January 17, 2013, with a 40-minute ceremony led by Aurora Mayor Steve Hogan, followed by a showing of The Hobbit: An Unexpected Journey. As of 2020, Cinemark Theatres has not released any photographs or video evidence.

Soon after the shooting, police departments and cinemas across the United States and around the world increased security for fear of copycat incidents. In New York City, police officers were deployed to theaters screening the new film.

The National Association of Theatre Owners distributed checklists from the U.S. Department of Homeland Security to its members and said in a July 21 statement that members were "working closely with local law enforcement agencies and reviewing security procedures". AMC Theatres announced it would "not allow any guests into our theatres in costumes that make other guests feel uncomfortable and we will not permit face-covering masks or fake weapons inside our buildings". Security Director News raised the possibility in a July 23 article that "the massacre could be a Virginia Tech for movie theaters, causing security to become a bigger part of the conversation and more stringent security procedures to be adopted at theaters across the country."

=== Civil litigation ===
==== Cinemark Theaters ====
Three victims sued Cinemark Theatres in the U.S. District Court for the District of Colorado on September 21, 2012, for the company's alleged negligence in failing to provide adequate safety and security measures. Their attorneys released a statement that "[r]eadily available security procedures, security equipment and security personnel would likely have prevented or deterred the gunman from accomplishing his planned assault on the theater's patrons."

In response, Cinemark's representation filed a motion to dismiss on September 27, 2012, on the grounds that there was no liability under Colorado law for failure to prevent an unforeseeable criminal act. Cinemark's motion quoted extensively from the landmark California appellate opinion that held McDonald's had no duty of care to prevent the 1984 San Ysidro McDonald's massacre. On October 30, 2012, the court hearing the criminal case against Holmes denied a motion by some of the survivors that would have let them access sealed evidence for review in their civil action against the theater chain. On January 24, 2013, U.S. Magistrate Judge Michael Hegarty issued a recommendation that most of the claims be dismissed, as they were not allowable under Colorado law. He also said claims alleging violations of the Colorado Premises Liability Act could proceed.

Judge R. Brooke Jackson stated that for theaters today, "One might reasonably believe that a mass shooting incident in a theater was likely enough (that is, not just a possibility) to be a foreseeable next step in the history of such acts by deranged individuals". Attorney Christina Habas, who represents several theater victims, has said, "We essentially don't have a single photograph, a single piece of evidence that we can show to a jury". In June 2016, a federal judge dismissed the last claims in the lawsuit.

In a separate lawsuit in state court, Cinemark was sued by families of the victims, who alleged the theater should have taken greater measures to prevent such a shooting. In May 2016, after years of legal debate, a jury took three hours to deliver a unanimous verdict that the theater chain was not liable to any degree. The judge allowed Cinemark Theatres to submit a bill of costs to the plaintiffs to recover expenses due to the litigation, as Colorado state law allows for prevailing parties. In September 2016, Cinemark dropped all claims for reimbursement of legal fees.

==== University of Colorado ====
On January 14, 2013, Chantel Blunk, the estranged wife and widow of victim Jonathan Blunk, sued the University of Colorado in federal court. She alleged that a school psychiatrist could have prevented the slaughter by having Holmes detained after he admitted he "fantasized about killing a lot of people". This type of lawsuit had been anticipated in an August 2012 article co-authored by bioethicist Arthur Caplan which discussed the applicability of the landmark California Supreme Court decision in Tarasoff v. Regents of the University of California (1976) to the facts of the Aurora shooting. The lawsuit was dismissed in 2016.

=== Community center ===
A grassroots community center, Aurora Strong Resilience Center, was established by community leaders, elected officials, and mental health professionals, as a response to the shooting. The center offers therapy for people who experienced traumatic stress from the theater shooting, and also people who were victims of other crimes and refugees who experienced a traumatic event in their country of origin before coming to the United States.

== Aftermath ==
=== Sale of guns and gun control debate ===
Colorado gun sales spiked after the shooting, with the number of background checks for people seeking to purchase a firearm in the state increasing to 2,887, up 43% from the previous week. Gun sales in Washington, Florida, California, and Georgia also increased. The shooting reignited the political debate on gun control, with one issue being the "easy access" Holmes had two semi-automatic rifles and high-capacity magazines, which were banned federally from 1994 to 2004. The results of a survey released on July 30, 2012, by the Pew Research Center suggested the incident did not change Americans' views on the issue.

=== Colorado ban on high-capacity magazines ===
On March 20, 2013, Colorado governor John Hickenlooper signed House bill 13-1224, which made the sale, transferral, or possession of magazines holding 15 rounds or more illegal unless said magazines were lawfully owned prior to July 1, 2013. The law also specified that firearms with a tubular magazine which are either chambered in .22 rimfire or operated by lever action are exempt from this regulation, as are magazines "permanently altered" to limit the capacity to 15 or fewer. On May 6, 2026, the United States Department of Justice sued the state of Colorado over the 2013 law banning high-capacity magazines, alleging it violates the Second Amendment.

=== Impact on film exhibition ===
In the immediate wake of the shooting, most theater chains announced a boost to the number of security personnel at their sites. The National Association of Theatre Owners said that its members would work with local law enforcement to develop changes to their security policies. AMC Theatres implemented a ban on face-concealing masks and fake weapons. This had particular significance because costumes were a common tradition in midnight showings, especially for fantasy and science fiction movies.

The shooting had a significant role in the end of traditional midnight previews for major movies in favor of earlier showtimes on Thursday. TheWrap had begun noting the shift as early as 2013, stating that both the incident and economic incentives had contributed to the change. In 2015, The Spectrum documented that midnight showings had largely disappeared. And in 2018, Variety confirmed that Thursday PM previews had become the norm, a paradigm that was precipitated by the shooting.

=== Campaign against media coverage ===
In 2015, a campaign titled "No Notoriety" was started by the parents of Alexander Teves, who died in the shooting. According to Teves' father, the campaign's incentive is to encourage media outlets to limit the usage of the suspect's name and photos when reporting about the Aurora shooting, as well as other mass shootings that receive national media coverage. In an interview on CNN, Teves' parents said they and the relatives of other victims believe the mass media coverage of Holmes' name and photo may inspire others to commit mass shootings or similar attacks for notoriety.

=== Theater ===
The Century 16 theater where the shooting occurred was rebranded as the Century Aurora theater by its parent company Cinemark Theatres. Despite heavy criticism from families and loved ones of victims, the theater was not demolished, and reopened to the public after cleaning and renovation on January 25, 2013, six months after the shooting. The reopening ceremony, which was boycotted by opponents of the theater's reopening, included a memorial service and a screening of The Hobbit: An Unexpected Journey. Theater room 9, where the actual shooting occurred, was combined with an adjoining room into a new XD theater room.

=== Memorial ===
A memorial to the victims of the attack was installed near Aurora Municipal Center, some 850 m (929.57 yd) from the theater, and dedicated on July 19, 2018, one day before the sixth anniversary of the attack. It consists of a park-like dell with 83 abstract birds, one for each victim. Thirteen of the birds, with translucent wings, are on a center column and represent the thirteen deceased victims, including the unborn child. The memorial, titled "Ascentiate", was designed by artist Douwe Blumberg.

=== Copycats ===
On July 22, 2015, in Broken Arrow, Oklahoma, two brothers murdered five of their family members; one of the perpetrators claimed that he and his brother planned the act for some time and intended to commit a shooting spree outside the family, hoping it would rival and even outdo both the 1999 Columbine High School massacre and the Aurora theater shooting.

== See also ==
- 1989 Harlem Nights movie theater shooting – Detroit suburban theater shooting that occurred simultaneous to a shooting scene in the film
- 1993 Aurora, Colorado shooting – shooting at a Chuck E. Cheese that also occurred in Aurora 19 years prior
- 2015 Lafayette shooting – theater shooting in Lafayette, Louisiana, that occurred during the screening of the film Trainwreck
- Dark Night, a 2016 film about the shooting
- Gun laws in Colorado
- Gun law in the United States
- Gun violence in the United States
- List of rampage killers in the United States
- Mass shootings in the United States
