= James Holmes (mass murderer) =

American mass murderer (born 1987)

- Mugshot of Holmes at Arapahoe; County Jail after his arrest
- Born: James Eagan Holmes; December 13, 1987 (age 38); San Diego, California, U.S.
- Education: University of California, Riverside (BS); University of Colorado, Denver (incomplete Ph.D. program)
- Known for: Perpetrator of the 2012 Aurora theater shooting
- Status: Incarcerated
- Motive: Disputed: Acquiring fame/infamy (prosecution); Severe mental illness caused by schizoaffective disorder (defense); Undetermined (psychological evaluation)
- Convictions: 12 counts of first degree murder 140 counts of attempted first degree murder 1 count of possessing an illegal explosive device 1 sentence enhancement of a crime of violence
- Penalty: 12 consecutive life sentences without the possibility of parole, and an additional 3,318 years

Details
- Killed: 12
- Injured: 70
- Weapons: Two tear gas grenades; .223 Smith & Wesson M&P15 Sport semi-automatic rifle; Remington 870 Express Tactical 12-gauge shotgun; .40 S&W Glock 22 Gen4 handgun
- Imprisoned at: USP Allenwood

James Eagan Holmes (born December 13, 1987) is an American convicted mass murderer who perpetrated the 2012 Aurora theater shooting in which he killed 12 people and injured 70 others (62 directly and eight indirectly) at a Century 16 movie theater on July 20, 2012. He had no known criminal background before the shooting occurred. Before the shooting, Holmes booby-trapped his apartment with explosives, which were defused one day later by a bomb squad. The shooting is the deadliest by a lone gunman in the U.S. state of Colorado.

Holmes was arrested shortly after the shooting and was jailed without bail while awaiting trial. Following this, he was hospitalized after attempting suicide several times while in jail. Holmes entered a plea of not guilty by reason of insanity, which was accepted. His trial began on April 27, 2015. On August 26, 2015, Judge Carlos Samour sentenced Holmes to 12 consecutive life sentences plus 3,318 years without parole after the jury spared Holmes the death penalty by a single vote. In imposing sentence, Judge Samour declared "it is the intention of this court that the defendant never set foot in free society again."

== Personal life ==
Holmes was born on December 13, 1987, in San Diego, California. His father Robert Holmes is a mathematician and scientist with degrees from Stanford University, UCLA and UC Berkeley, and his mother Arlene Holmes is a registered nurse. He has a younger sister. Some of his father's ancestors came to the U.S. via the Mayflower, and thus he has some English ancestry.

Holmes was raised in Oak Hills, a community in Monterey County near Castroville, California, where he attended elementary school. At twelve years old, Holmes moved back to San Diego. There, he lived in the affluent Rancho Peñasquitos neighborhood, where he reportedly began to decline socially. He went to Westview High School and graduated in 2006. Holmes played soccer and ran cross-country in high school. He attended Peñasquitos Lutheran Church with his family, according to the Lutheran church's pastor. According to Holmes' lawyer, Daniel King, Holmes began to suffer from mental health issues in middle school and attempted suicide at age 11.

According to Holmes, during his childhood, he was frightened of what he called "Nail Ghosts" that would hammer on the walls at night. Holmes saw social worker Margaret Roth once before she sent him to psychiatrist Lynne Fenton. Holmes was depressed and "obsessed with killing for over a decade".

Despite these issues, Holmes graduated from high school in 2006 with high academic honors and completed a bachelor's degree at University of California, Riverside, with top grades, in 2010. He decided to pursue a graduate degree in neuroscience at the University of Colorado and moved to Aurora.

In Aurora, Holmes lived on Paris Street in a one-bedroom apartment in a building with other students involved in health studies at the University of Colorado. In a rental application for an apartment, he described himself as "quiet and easygoing", and in an online dating profile, Holmes identified himself as an agnostic. He left some digital footprints, like a university email address, an old Myspace photo, a dating profile on Match.com, and a profile on Adult FriendFinder, as well as a résumé at the employment website Monster.com. Holmes allegedly hired sex workers and left reviews of their services on an online message board.

In October 2011, Holmes began dating a fellow student in his biology class. Their relationship lasted until a Saint Patrick's Day encounter between Holmes and another man who talked to her during a date. She said that the episode made her feel distant from him, that Holmes often made deadpan jokes that made other people feel uncomfortable, and that he had expressed his desire to kill people. She tried to recommend him getting professional help despite not taking his claims seriously. They resumed their relationship in early January 2012, but it ended again in February. Holmes told a state-appointed psychiatric physician that "their breakup contributed to his violent depression."

== Education and career ==
In 2006, Holmes worked as an intern at the Salk Institute for Biological Studies, where he was assigned to write computer code for an experiment. Holmes, who was described by his supervisor as stubborn, uncommunicative and socially inept, presented his project to the other interns at the end of the internship, but never completed it.

Holmes wrote of his experience at the Salk Institute in a college application essay: "I had little experience in computer programming and the work was challenging to say the least. Nonetheless, I taught myself how to program in Flash and then construct a cross-temporal calibration model.... Completing the project and presenting my model at the end of the internship was exhilarating."

Graduating from Westview High School in the Torrey Highlands community of San Diego in 2006, Holmes attended the University of California, Riverside (UCR). In 2010, he received his undergraduate B.S. degree in neuroscience with highest honors. He was a member of several honor societies, including Phi Beta Kappa and Golden Key. According to UCR recommendation letters submitted to the University of Illinois at Urbana–Champaign (UIUC), Holmes graduated in the top 1 percent of his class with a 3.949 GPA. The UCR letters also described Holmes as "a very effective group leader" and a person who "takes an active role in his education, and brings a great amount of intellectual and emotional maturity into the classroom". Holmes scored in the 98th percentile on the verbal portion, the 94th percentile on the quantitative portion and the 45th percentile on the analytical writing portion of the Graduate Record Examinations.

In the summer of 2008, Holmes worked as a counselor at a residential summer camp in Glendale, California, which served children aged 7–14. There, he was responsible for ten children and had no disciplinary problems.

In the fall of 2010, Holmes was employed at a pill and capsule-coating factory in San Diego County. One of his co-workers later said that Holmes was unsociable, and once acted strangely at a laboratory work station by staring at a blank wall and not verbally responding, only making a quick glance and smirking, when his co-worker asked if he was okay.

In June 2011, Holmes enrolled as a Ph.D. student in neuroscience at the University of Colorado Anschutz Medical Campus in Aurora. He received a $21,600 grant from the National Institutes of Health, according to agency records, which was disbursed in installments from July 2011 to June 2012. Holmes also received a $5,000 stipend from the University of Colorado, Denver. Though Holmes received a letter of acceptance to UIUC, where he was offered a $22,600 stipend and free tuition, he declined their offer without specifying a reason. Reviewers of Holmes' application at UIUC remembered his application in part because he submitted a picture of himself with a llama.

Beginning in graduate school, Holmes would see shadows and "flickers" at the corners of his eyes, which would fight each other with firearms and other weapons. At the University of Colorado, Holmes sought help in 2012 for his mental state at the student health clinic after he broke up with his girlfriend. Because he pleaded not guilty by reason of insanity, his caregivers were allowed to testify at his trial. He was seen by psychiatrist Dr. Lynne Fenton, who testified at his trial that she was worried about his homicidal ideation expressed in their last meeting. She saw him a total of seven times over three months, twice with a male psychiatrist. Holmes rejected their suggestions for treatment. In June 2012 after Holmes had sent her a threatening email, she activated a threat assessment team to help her formulate a plan for Holmes. She expressed concerns about his social phobia and "psychotic-level thinking" and believed he may have had schizoid personality disorder. She listed specific concerns, such as his long-standing fantasies about killing as many people as possible, his reluctance to discuss any details about his plans, his refusal to allow them to talk to anyone else and the unclear timeline; she didn't know if he was always that way or if this was a new behavior. She consulted with his mother, who said he had longstanding social problems. Although the center offered to treat him if he lost his insurance, he left treatment.

In 2012, Holmes' academic performance declined, and he scored poorly on the comprehensive exam in the spring. The university was not planning to expel him; however, Holmes was in the process of withdrawing from the university. Three days after failing a key oral exam at the university in early June 2012, Holmes dropped out of his studies without further explanation. At the time of his arrest, he gave his occupation as "laborer."

== Aurora theater shooting ==
=== Background ===
Holmes' defense attorneys stated in a motion that he was a psychiatric patient of the medical director of Anschutz Medical Campus's Student Mental Health Services prior to the Aurora shooting. The prosecutor disagreed with that claim. Four days after the release of the defense attorney's motion, the judge required this information to be blacked out. CBS News later reported that Holmes had met with at least three mental health professionals at the University of Colorado before the massacre. One of them, who was informed by Holmes of his homicidal thoughts, considered placing him on an involuntary mental health hold, but decided against it, noting her belief that Holmes was "borderline" and the commitment would only inflame him.

One of Holmes' psychiatrists suspected that prior to the shooting, Holmes suffered from a mental illness that could have been dangerous. A month before the attack, Dr. Lynne Fenton told the campus police that he had also made homicidal statements. Two weeks before the massacre, Holmes sent a text message asking a graduate student if the student had ever heard of the disorder dysphoric mania, and warning the student to stay away from him "because [he was] bad news".

Initial reports from the Los Angeles Times quoting one of Holmes' classmates indicated that Holmes was a fan of superheroes and also quoted an anonymous law enforcement official as claiming that Holmes' apartment was "decorated with Batman paraphernalia". However, later reports described Holmes' apartment as relatively empty, while mentioning the presence of a single Batman mask. George Brauchler, the district attorney who prosecuted Holmes, stated after the trial that there was no evidence to suggest that Holmes had an obsession with Batman. William Reid, the psychiatrist who interviewed Holmes after the shooting, said that Holmes "picked that movie simply because it was guaranteed to be full". Dave Aragón, an actor from the MTV television series Pimp My Ride, stated that Holmes called him twice the month before the shooting took place. Aragón was the writer, director, and star of a then-upcoming film titled The Suffocator of Sins, which depicts a vigilante who shoots criminals, and Aragón claimed that Holmes showed interest in his movie's trailer.

According to Arapahoe County District Attorney George Brauchler, Holmes chose the Century 16 theater for his attack because he liked movie theaters and that specific theater had doors that he could lock in order to increase the number of casualties, as well as being in an area where police response would take longer. He specifically chose to attack a midnight screening because he believed fewer children would be present, not wanting to kill them. Holmes allegedly considered other locations for a mass shooting, such as an airport, but ruled it out because an airport would have too much security. He also wrote his reasoning that an attack on an airport would be confused as an act of terrorism, saying, "Terrorism isn't the message. The message is, there is no message." In addition, he had been considering using explosives, chemical agents, or biological agents in his attack, but rejected the scenario as he thought he might "blow himself up". Holmes had also considered serial killing as an option, but later reasoned it was "too personal, too much evidence, easily caught, few kills."

=== Prelude ===
On May 22, 2012, Holmes purchased a Glock 22 pistol at a Gander Mountain shop in Aurora. Six days later, on May 28, he bought a Remington 870 Express Tactical shotgun at a Bass Pro Shops store in Denver. On June 7, just hours after failing his oral exam at the university, he purchased a Smith & Wesson M&P15 Sport rifle. All three of these weapons were bought legally, and background checks were performed. In the four months prior to the shooting, Holmes also bought 3,000 rounds of ammunition for the pistol, 3,000 rounds for the M&P15, and 350 shells for the shotgun over the Internet. On July 2, he placed an order for a Blackhawk Urban Assault Vest, two magazine holders, and a knife at an online retailer. He also purchased spike strips, which he later admitted he planned to use in case police would shoot at or follow him in a car chase.

On June 25, less than a month before the shooting, Holmes emailed an application to join a gun club in Byers, Colorado. The owner, Glenn Rotkovich, called him several times throughout the following days to invite him to a mandatory orientation, but could only reach his answering machine. Holmes left Rotkovich one voicemail in reply. Due to the nature of Holmes' voicemail, which Rotkovich described as "bizarre", "freaky", "guttural", "spoken with a deep voice", "incoherent and rambling", Rotkovich instructed his staff to inform him if Holmes showed up, though Holmes neither appeared at the gun range nor called back. "In hindsight, looking back – and if I'd seen the movies – maybe I'd say it was like the Joker – I would have gotten the Joker out of it... It was like somebody was trying to be as weird as possible," Rotkovich said.

On July 19, just hours before the shooting started, Holmes mailed a notebook to his psychiatrist. The notebook detailed his thoughts and plans during the weeks preceding the shooting. The notebook was found in an undelivered package in the Anschutz Medical Campus mail-room. Immediately prior to the shooting, Holmes reportedly called a crisis hotline for mental health with the hopes that someone would talk him out of committing the massacre at the last minute. However, the call was disconnected after nine seconds.

=== Arrest ===
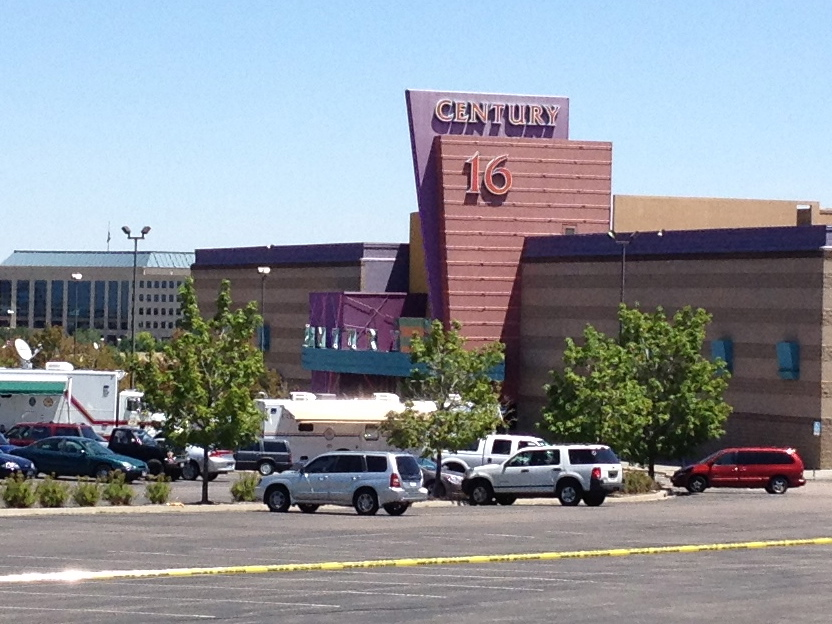
Century 16 at Town Center at Aurora, scene of the shooting

Holmes snuck out of an exit door, propped it open, and returned with weapons and other gear, setting off several gas or smoke canisters. He then opened fire on the theater audience, killing 12 and wounding 70. On July 20, 2012, police arrested Holmes without resistance while he was standing next to his car behind the Century 16 theater, moments after the shooting. According to testimonies during the following trial, Holmes was initially "calm and detached" during the arrest, but became interested in watching the aftermath of the shooting after being placed in the back of a police car. The responding officers recovered several guns from inside the car and the theater.

Once apprehended, Holmes told the police that he had booby-trapped his apartment with explosive devices before heading to the theater. Police later confirmed the presence of explosives in the apartment.

== Legal proceedings ==
=== Detention and pretrial court appearances ===
Holmes was initially jailed at Arapahoe Detention Center, under suicide watch. He was held in solitary confinement to protect him from other inmates, a routine precaution for high-profile cases.

Holmes made his first court appearance in Centennial, Colorado, on July 23, 2012, before Judge William B. Sylvester. He was read his rights, and no bail was set due to the nature of the charges. A mandatory protection order was issued by the judge. The judge appointed the Colorado State Public Defender for Holmes' defense. Holmes said nothing and never looked at the judge. His appearance and behavior, which was described as "dazed" and "confused" fueled speculation about his mental state.

On July 30, Colorado prosecutors filed formal charges against Holmes that included 24 counts of first degree murder, 116 counts of attempted murder, possession of explosive devices, and inciting violence. The multiple charges expand the opportunities for prosecutors to obtain convictions. For each person killed in the shooting, Holmes was charged with one count of murder with deliberation and one count of murder with extreme indifference. Holmes agreed in court to waive his right to a preliminary hearing within 35 days.

On August 9, Holmes' attorneys said their client was mentally ill and that they needed more time to assess the nature of his illness. The disclosure was made at a court hearing in Centennial where news media organizations were asking a judge to unseal court documents in the case.

On September 19, the prosecution filed a motion to add 10 new charges against Holmes and asked to amend 17 others. The additional charges would bring the total counts Holmes faced to 152. Holmes appeared in the Arapahoe County Court house the following day for the first time without his dyed-red hair, his cropped hair revealing his natural brown color.

On September 28, court documents released by prosecutors said Holmes’ access to the University of Colorado campus was revoked because he threatened a professor. The university had said Holmes was denied access to non-public parts of the campus because he had withdrawn from school.

On October 11, Holmes' attorneys asked Judge William Sylvester to postpone a preliminary hearing scheduled for November. On October 25, the preliminary hearing was set for the week of January 7.

Holmes' lawyers filed an emergency motion on November 14 to delay a pre-trial hearing, citing an unspecified condition that left him unable to appear in court: "As a result of developments over the past 24 hours, Mr. Holmes is in a condition that renders him unable to be present in court for tomorrow's hearing." They requested a delay, which they received. It was rescheduled for December. Evidently, Holmes made various suicide attempts referred to as "half-hearted" in the days before the scheduled hearing on November 15.

Holmes returned to court on January 7, 2013, at which 9-1-1 phone call recordings and videos from the cineplex were presented as evidence, information that up until then had not been released. Holmes's defense team continued to maintain that he was mentally ill. On that same day, it was reported that investigators seized four prescription bottles plus immunization records from his apartment when it was searched in July 2012. It was not revealed what the prescriptions were or what they were for. The judge ultimately ruled in October that prosecutors could keep the items.

On January 10, 2013, a judge ruled that the evidence presented was sufficient for Holmes to face trial on all counts with which he had been charged. His plea hearing was delayed until March 2013.

On March 27, 2013, Holmes' attorneys said he would be willing to plead guilty to avoid the death penalty. On March 28, prosecutors said they were not ready to accept Holmes' offer to plead guilty and avoid the death penalty and also criticized the offer as a deliberate ploy by the defense in order to delay the start of the trial.

On April 1, 2013, prosecutors announced they would seek the death penalty in a trial to start in February 2014. On May 7, 2013, Holmes's attorneys filed their intent for him to plead not guilty by reason of insanity. He made this change in his plea on May 31. On May 23, 2013, Holmes's attorneys called the state's insanity-plea rules unconstitutional. On May 29, 2013, the judge ruled on the constitutionality of the laws for an insanity plea questioned by Holmes's attorneys, concluding that the laws were not in violation of the Constitution. On June 4, 2013, the presiding judge accepted his plea of insanity.

On August 5, 2013, Holmes was transferred to the Colorado Mental Health Institute in Pueblo, Colorado. By August 20, 2013, Holmes was no longer detained at Colorado Mental Health Institute.

=== Trial ===
On February 27, 2014, Arapahoe County District Court Judge Carlos Samour set the start of Holmes' trial for October 14. The trial was delayed to December 8 upon a defense request for a continuance to further evaluate Holmes' mental condition. On that date, the trial was again postponed, as Holmes' lawyers asked for another continuance to further prepare their case and review the paperwork of evidence.

Jury selection eventually started on January 20, 2015, after a request by Holmes' lawyers for yet another continuance was denied. The juror selection process lasted three months and summoned 9,000 candidates, making it the largest jury summons in U.S. history. On April 15, selection ended, with a total of nineteen women and five men serving. There were concerns about the selection of the jurors, as at least two from the pool of twelve primary jurors, along with twelve alternates, had ties to the 1999 Columbine High School massacre: "Juror No. 535", was the aunt of a Columbine survivor; and "Juror No. 737", was a student there at the time and was also a former friend of the shooters.

The trial began on April 27 with opening arguments by the prosecution explaining that Holmes intentionally went to the movie theater that evening with the deliberate intent to kill as many people as possible in a mass shooting spree. The defense opened their argument by admitting the fact that Holmes was the shooter, but said that he was mentally ill with severe schizophrenia and was never in control of his right mind. Starting on April 28, and over the next few weeks, prosecution testimony included various survivors of the massacre and enumerated the after-effects on the survivors.

On May 26, the notebook Holmes mailed to his psychiatrist hours prior to the shooting was presented as evidence. There had previously been intense debate as to whether the notebook was eligible as evidence and should be admitted, since it detailed Holmes' thoughts. Prosecutors argued the content in Holmes' notebook, which had attack plans, proved the shooting was premeditated, while Holmes' attorneys argued that his writing indicated his mental illness.

On May 27, William Reid, a court-appointed psychiatrist who interviewed Holmes for a total of about 22 hours, testified that Holmes was mentally ill but legally sane. He diagnosed him as having schizotypal personality disorder, which is characterized by constricted behavior and difficulties relating to others. Reid and another doctor evaluated Holmes in December 2013, determining him to be legally sane, and said that his mental illness did not prevent him from forming intent and knowing the consequences of his actions. Holmes had told Reid that he did not target children, hence why he chose a PG-13 film showing, and felt remorse when he learned children were killed. Holmes's attorneys tried to call for a mistrial, saying that the jurors heard an unprompted opinion that complicated the legal standard for judging the sanity of a person, but the judge refused to grant the request.

On May 29, videos of Reid's interviews with Holmes in 2013 were shown to the court. In the videos, Holmes described his social awkwardness and the violent, paranoid thoughts he had been having prior to the massacre. He also stated his belief that he was being followed by federal agents at the time of the massacre and hoped they would apprehend him at the theater before he could act. According to him, he transitioned from suicidal thoughts to homicidal thoughts after becoming depressed from his breakup with his girlfriend. On June 8, a second psychiatrist, Jeffrey Metzner, testified that Holmes was mentally ill but legally sane when he plotted and carried out the shooting, and that he suffered from schizoaffective disorder. He interviewed Holmes for a total of 25 hours.

On June 9, the trial came to a standstill after three jurors were dismissed by the judge for violating orders to refrain from talking about news reports regarding the trial. One of the jurors had begun discussions about sensitive details of the case with the other two jurors outside of the court on at least two occasions. Two days later, Holmes's attorneys requested the dismissal of a fourth juror after her brother-in-law was shot during a robbery the previous day, and other jurors had seen her crying. Judge Carlos Samour responded that he would consider it, and agreed to the motion by dismissing her on June 15. On June 17, a fifth juror was dismissed after Judge Samour was advised that she personally knew a wounded victim of the shooting.

On June 19, the prosecution called as their last witness Ashley Moser, the mother of slain victim Veronica Moser-Sullivan. Moser was critically injured and left paralyzed by the shooting. Afterward, they rested their case.

On July 9, Samour asked Holmes if he would testify in court, and advised him of his right to do so. Holmes chose not to testify.

On July 10, the defense showed two videos of Holmes' behavior in his jail cell. One video showed him running and slamming his head against the wall before sitting down while the other showed him tethered to a bed while naked, attempting to cover his head with a blanket and then a sheet. Afterward, they rested their case.

On July 14, closing statements were made; jury deliberations began on July 15 and continued into July 16.

=== Verdict and sentencing ===
On July 16, after deliberating for over twelve hours, the jurors found Holmes guilty on all twenty-four counts of first-degree murder, 140 counts of attempted first-degree murder, one count of possessing explosives, and a sentence enhancement of a crime of violence. They began deciding his sentence on July 22. The court expected the sentencing phase to last for one month. Holmes declined to make an allocution statement. On July 23, the jury ruled that Holmes acted in a cruel manner, was lying in wait, and ambushed his victims during the shooting, which constituted aggravating factors. The jurors decided that Holmes did not intend to kill children when he opened fire.

On July 27, Holmes's sister testified that her brother became withdrawn from the family after they moved from Salinas to San Diego during his early teenage years. On July 28, Holmes' father pleaded for his son's life, stating that he is severely mentally ill and did not deserve to die, regardless of his crimes. He displayed photos of camping trips and family vacations with Holmes to the jury. On July 30, Holmes' lawyers made a final appeal to the jurors, urging them to consider mental illness in his sentencing, despite their rejection of the insanity defense used in the trial. The appeal for clemency was rejected on August 3, based on mitigating factors such as mental illness not outweighing aggravating factors such as the number of casualties in the massacre.

On August 7, Holmes was sentenced to life in prison without the possibility of parole after jurors failed to unanimously agree on a death sentence. One juror was opposed to sentencing Holmes to death due to his mental health issues, while two other jurors were uncertain. Formal sentencing began on August 24 and ended on August 26. On August 26, Samour formally sentenced Holmes to 12 consecutive life sentences without the possibility of parole for the murder charges, and an additional 3,318 years for the attempted murder and explosives possession charges. In imposing the sentence, Samour stated for the record that it was "the intention of the court that the defendant never sets foot in free society again", and added that "the defendant deserves no sympathy."

=== Restitution ===
On December 4, 2015, Judge Carlos Samour ordered Holmes to pay $955,000 in restitution to the victims. The judgment ordered $851,000 of the restitution to be sent to the state victim compensation fund, and $103,000 to be paid directly to the victims.

== Imprisonment ==
In September 2015, Holmes was moved to the Colorado State Penitentiary in Cañon City. Authorities said they had not determined at which facility Holmes would be ultimately incarcerated and that it was possible he might be moved out of state due to his notoriety.

On October 8, 2015, Holmes was assaulted by another inmate, identified as Mark Daniels, who had been convicted of auto theft. Daniels attacked Holmes after a corrections officer inadvertently opened a gate separating the two; he struck Holmes twice before being subdued by prison staff. At the time, Holmes was not allowed interaction with other inmates. As a result of the attack, he was secretly transferred to an undisclosed location outside the state. Holmes is currently incarcerated at USP Allenwood in Gregg Township, Union County, Pennsylvania. The exact reason for the transfer to federal custody is not known for certain; the Washington Post speculated that it was, in part, due to a heightened need for security.

== See also ==
- Gun laws in Colorado
- List of rampage killers
