= Oak Hills, Monterey County, California =

Unincorporated community in California, United States

Oak Hills
- Unincorporated community
- Location in California
- Coordinates: 36°46′40″N 121°42′58″W
- Country: United States
- State: California
- County: Monterey
- County service area established: 1966
- Elevation: 56 ft (17 m)

Oak Hills is an unincorporated community in Monterey County, California, United States. It lies at an elevation of 56 feet (17 m) and is located on California State Route 156 between Castroville and Prunedale.

== Notable people ==
- James Holmes, perpetrator of the 2012 Aurora shooting, sentenced to 12 life sentences without parole plus 3,318 years, attended elementary school in Oak Hills.
