= William Reid (psychiatrist) =

American forensic psychiatrist

William H. Reid is an American forensic psychiatrist based in Texas. Reid has given expert witness testimony on several high-profile legal cases and has contributed to various academic publications.

== Early life ==
Reid graduated with a B.A. in psychology in 1966 and completed his M.D. medical degree in 1970, both at the University of Minnesota. He undertook a psychiatric residency at the University of California, Davis, between 1970 and 1975, interrupted for military service. He then obtained a Master of Public Health (M.P.H) qualification from the University of California, Berkeley in 1975.

== Career ==
Reid is a professor at Texas Tech University Health Sciences Center, the Texas A&M College of Medicine, and the University of Texas Dell Medical School. He was the Medical Director of the Texas Department of Mental Health and Mental Retardation from 1989 to 1996. He has authored or co-authored over 300 publications and abstracts, and 17 books, including A Dark Night in Aurora, which described the life of, mass shooting by, and trial of James Holmes.

For the 2015 trial of James Holmes for the 2012 Aurora, Colorado shooting, Reid was retained as Judge Carlos Samour, Jr.'s independent forensic expert. He reported around 300 hours of preparation and conducted 22 hours of perpetrator interviews which were shown in their entirety to the jury. He reportedly was paid $500,000. He nearly caused a mistrial by immediately openly opining that Holmes met the legal standard of sanity. The BBC in 2017 reported that Reid had told them the shooting "was completely unrelated to the medication. For me, it was a result of mental illness" (but not sufficient illness to find him legally insane at the time).

In 2005 Reid supported psychiatrist Park Dietz over erroneous testimony that had contributed to a guilty verdict and a possible execution of Andrea Yates. Dietz had testified that Yates got the idea of drowning children and claiming postpartum psychosis from a recent episode of Law and Order, a TV show Dietz had consulted on, but later admitted such an episode didn't exist and that Yates hadn't told him she watched the show. Reid called it an 'accident' and 'off-the-cuff answer' that shouldn't affect Dietz's credibility, blaming the prosecutor for exploiting it.

In 2001 Reid reported on statistics resulting from a law in Texas that all deaths within two weeks of Electroconvulsive therapy be reported to the Department of Mental Health and Mental Retardation; the article concluded that "The mortality rate associated with ECT (less than two per 100,000 treatments) in Texas is extremely low" and opposed the reporting of deaths within two weeks. A 2010 British study reported the Reid article as concluding that suicides after ECT were unrelated to the treatment itself, but were themselves "unable to determine whether ECT suicides occurred due to relapse or to the receipt of ECT".

In 1999 Reid published an informal survey of psychiatrists who had personally, or knew of relatives who had personally, undergone electroconvulsive therapy. Reid reported in abstract that based on the psychiatrists' informal perceptions, "Almost all patients had moderate to excellent improvement" while clarifying in the full text that this was "sometimes with lasting relief". Reid alleged that later limited availability of ECT contributed to two suicides.

In 1998 Reid, along with an economist from Novartis pharmaceutical company, reported a significantly lower rate of suicides in patients prescribed clozapine. Yale professor of psychiatry Michael Sernyak and others have critiqued the statistical comparison for excluding suicides by people who had discontinued clozapine, a factor potentially linked to suicide, as well as not systematically establishing the basic demographic equivalence of the groups.
