= Mershops Town Center at Aurora =

Shopping center in Aurora, Colorado

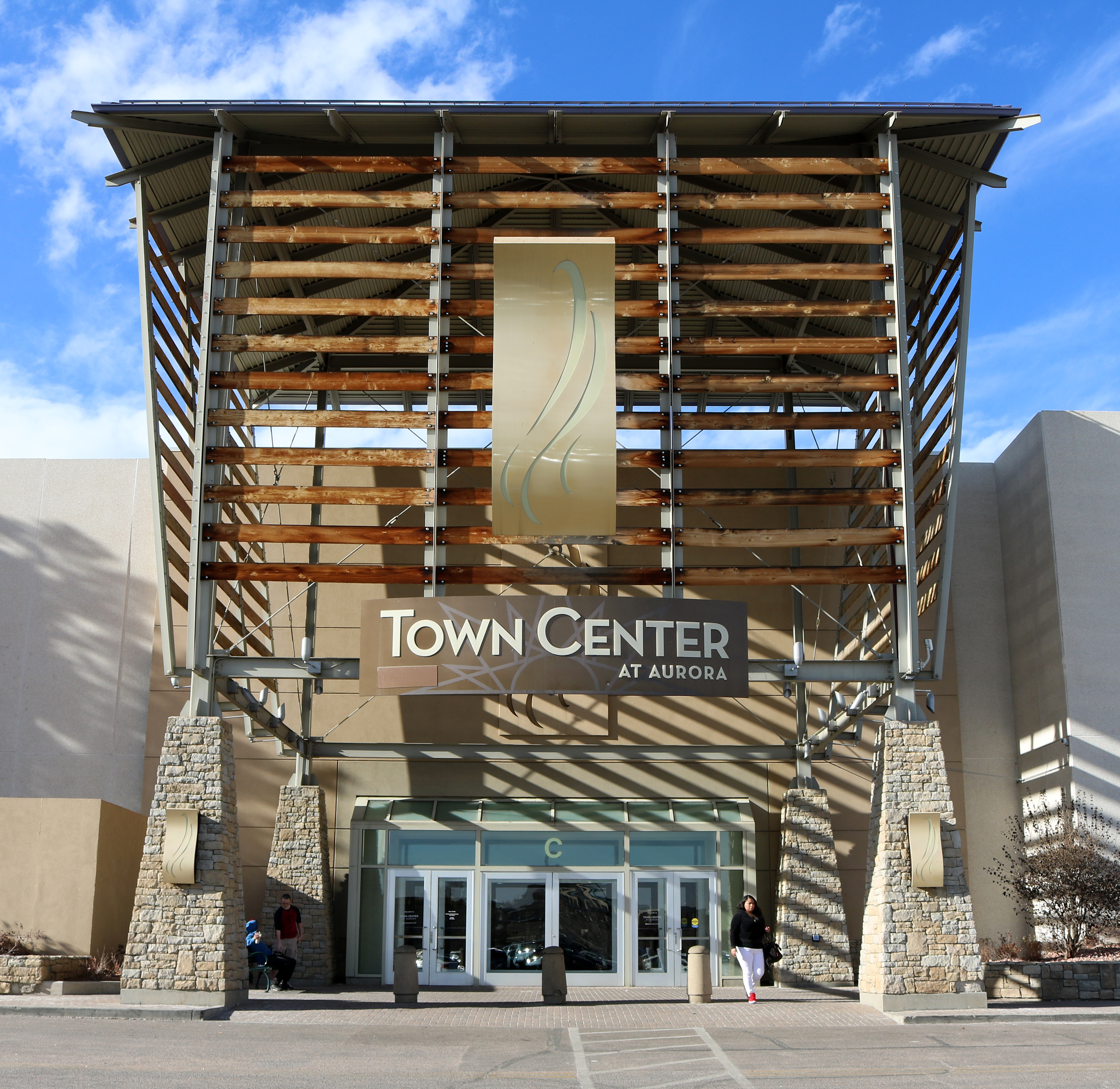
- One of the Mershops Town Center at Aurora’s entrances in Aurora, Colorado. (Pictured January 20, 2018)
- Location: Aurora, Colorado, US
- Coordinates: 39°42′29″N 104°49′25″W
- Address: 14200 E. Alameda Ave.
- Opened: 1975; 51 years ago
- Previous names: Aurora Mall (1975 - 2005) Town Center at Aurora (2005 - 2026)
- Developer: Edward J. DeBartolo Corporation
- Manager: Spinoso Real Estate Group
- Owner: Mershops
- Num. of stores: 125
- Num. of anchor tenants: 4
- Floor area: 1,081,000 sq ft (100,400 m^{2})
- Floors: 2
- Website: http://www.towncenterataurora.com

Mershops Town Center at Aurora is an enclosed, two-level regional shopping center located in Aurora, Colorado, and covers a leasable area over 1 million square feet. It lies at the center of the commercial and retail district in the area, adjacent to Aurora City Square, Aurora City Place, and Aurora Park Shopping Center, a strip mall. The commercial district itself is located in central Aurora, and the mall's primary trade area includes a mostly suburban, middle-income demographic. The mall is owned by Mershops and is managed by Spinoso Real Estate Group.

== Stores ==
Anchor stores and major tenants at the mall are Dillard's (originally The Denver, became May-D&F in 1987, then Foley's in 1993), Macy's (originally May-D&F, became May-D&F Men's in 1987, then Foley's Men's in 1993, then a full-line Foley's in 2005), JCPenney, Century Theatres, and Fieldhouse USA (originally Sears).

== History ==
=== Construction and Opening ===
The mall was developed by the Edward J. DeBartolo Corporation in 1974, and opened a year later in 1975 as Aurora Mall. The mall is set in a typical sprawling, suburban environment, and the demographics mostly reflect that trend.

=== 2000s and 2010s ===
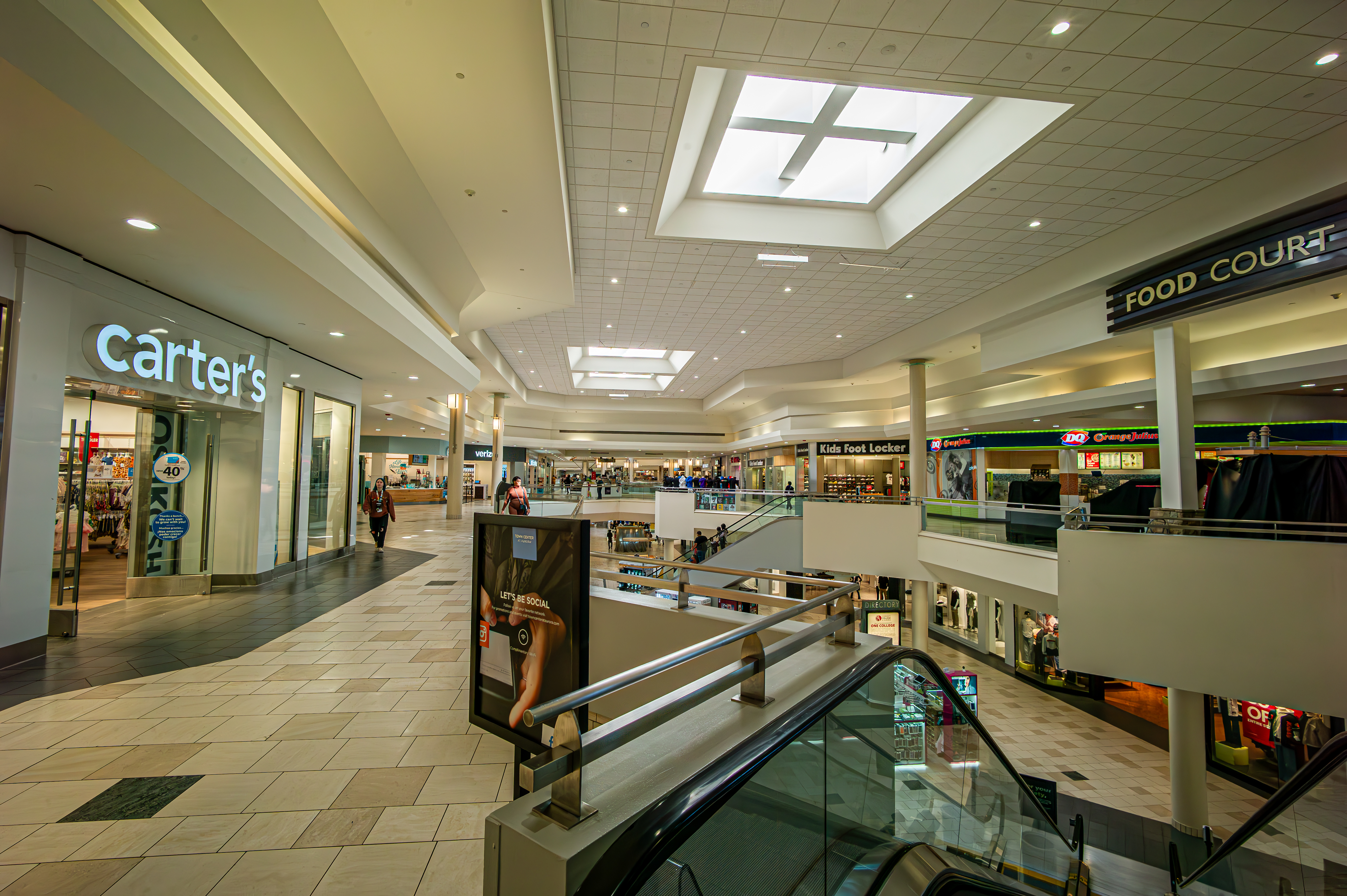
Interior of Mershops Town Center at Aurora near the food court.

In 2003, the mall announced a major two-part renovation with a cost of approximately $100 million. The first part consisted of a remodeling of the Foley's department store, to a Dillard's that replaced the former anchor. Dillard's at Buckingham Square Mall, also in Aurora, closed, and moved into the newly renovated space. The second part involved the rest of the mall, including the construction of a new food court, re-pavement, and other site upgrades. The renovation project was completed in 2005, and the mall reopened under its new name Town Center at Aurora.

During the renovation project, a controversy arose regarding one of mall management's new focus on attracting a white-only clientele. A top leasing agent was recorded in a conversation with a tenant, who served food that apparently catered to an ethnic minority. The conversation seemed to provide the mall's new direction after renovations were complete: to discourage people of an ethnic minority from shopping there. City officials quickly condemned the "racist" views, and demanded an apology from Simon's management; no apology has yet been given.

On August 31, 2019, it was announced that Sears would be closing this location a part of a plan to close 92 stores nationwide. The store closed on December 15, 2019.

=== 2020s ===
In August 2021, the former Sears became a Fieldhouse USA.

In April 2025, it was announced that the malls owner, Washington Prime Group (WPG), which had owned Town Center at Aurora since 2014, announced that it will be selling off the rest of its portfolio, which included Town Center at Aurora.

In January 2026, Mershops quietly purchased the Town Center at Aurora for an unknown price from Washington Prime Group (WPG). Because of this acquisition, Town Center at Aurora was rebranded as Mershops Town Center at Aurora in line with other Mershops centers.

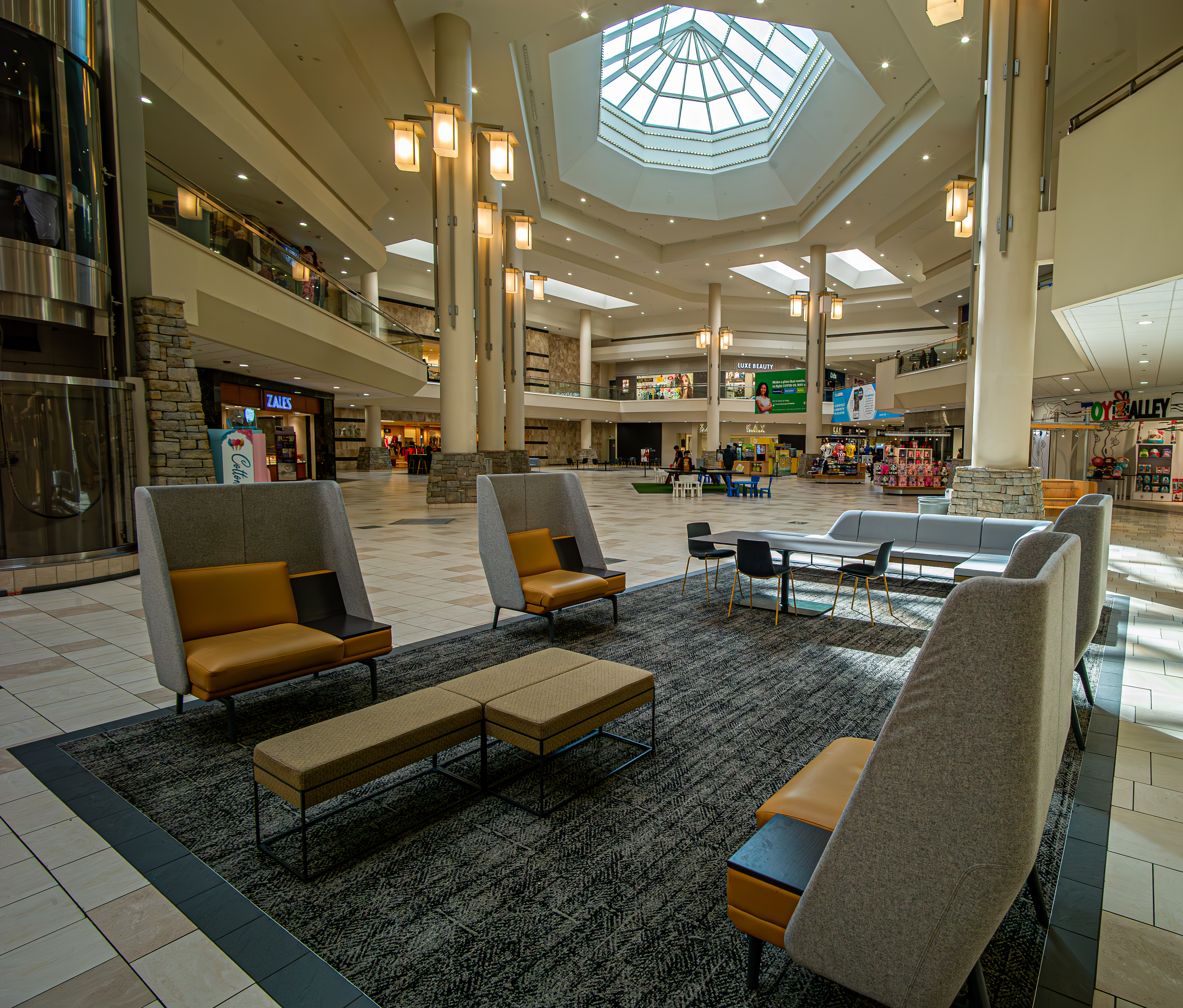
Interior of Mershops Town Center at Aurora in the center court.

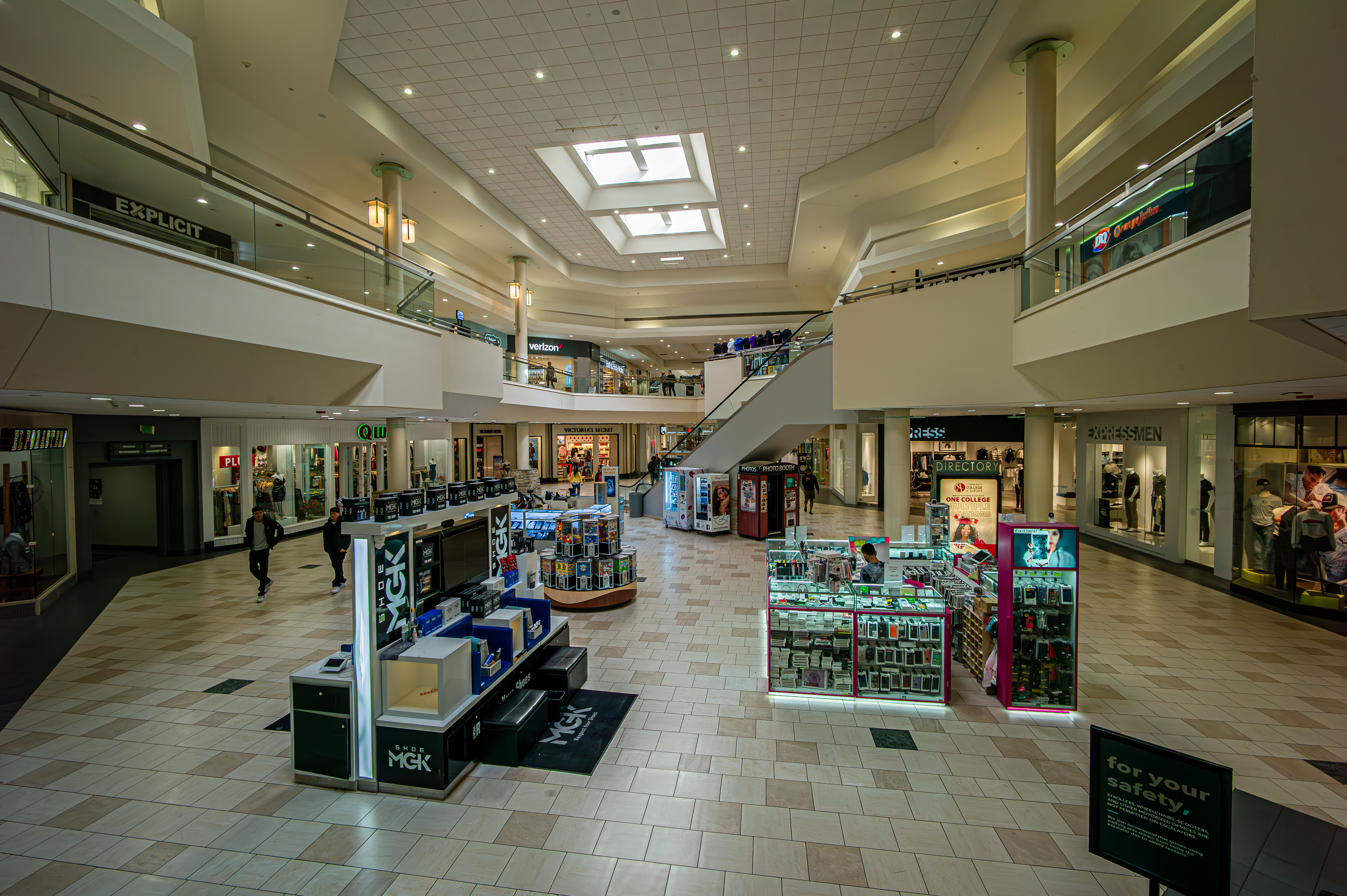
Interior of Mershops Town Center at Aurora in the center court.

=== 2012 shooting ===
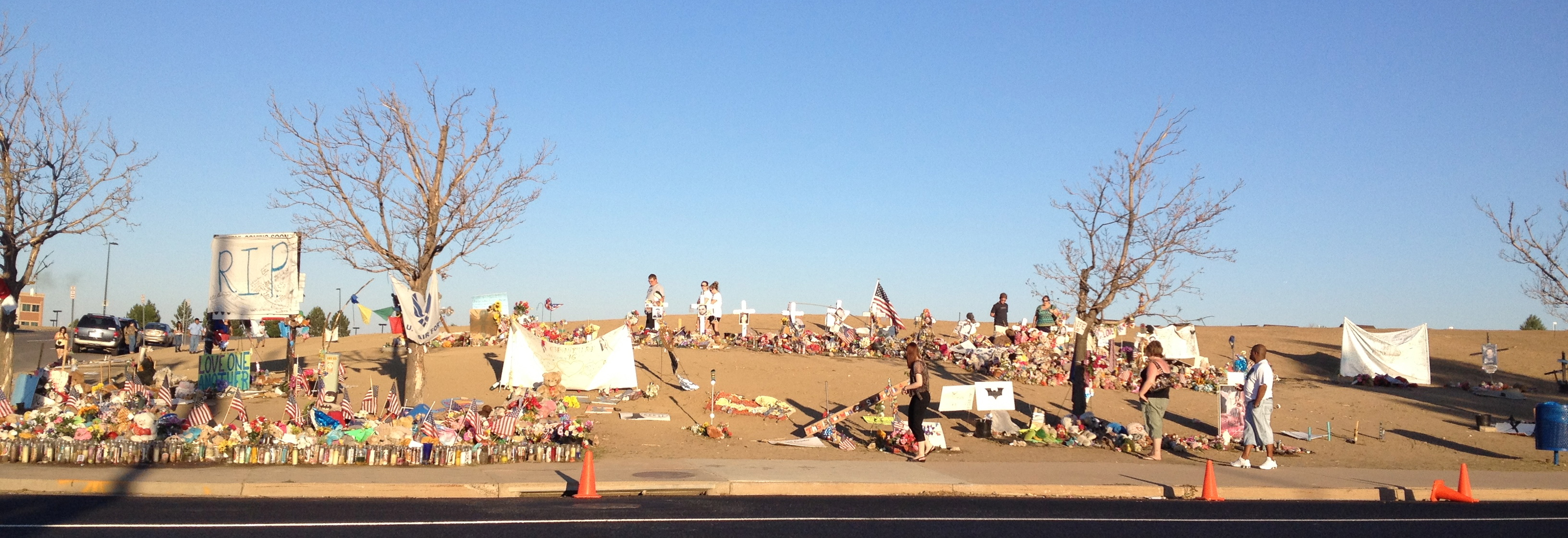
Memorial near Mershops Town Center at Aurora for the shooting at the Century Movie Theatre.

On July 20, 2012, a mass shooting occurred at the Century 16 at Town Center at Aurora, during a midnight screening of the film The Dark Knight Rises. A gunman, dressed in tactical clothing, set off tear gas grenades and shot into the audience with multiple firearms, killing 12 people and injuring 70 others. The gunman, James Holmes, was arrested outside the cinema minutes later. On August 24, 2015, he was sentenced to life in prison without the possibility of parole.

== Community ==
Due in part to the Town Center's suburban environment and demographic, the Aurora Public Schools (APS) system and Aurora's PTO are heavily involved in the mall's events and activities.

The mall sponsors a "Cash for Class" program, which awards schools within the district based on a points system. Schools can get points for submitting report cards, attendance records, and even mall purchases. All rewards are provided directly to the schools. In 2011, Town Center at Aurora awarded a total of $13,000 to nine schools.

In 2009, APS announced a new computer system in a joint venture with the mall. Several kiosks were installed throughout the mall. The system allows parents to view grades, assignments, and other resources regarding their child's education, as well as to browse the mall's various shopping events.

== Gallery ==
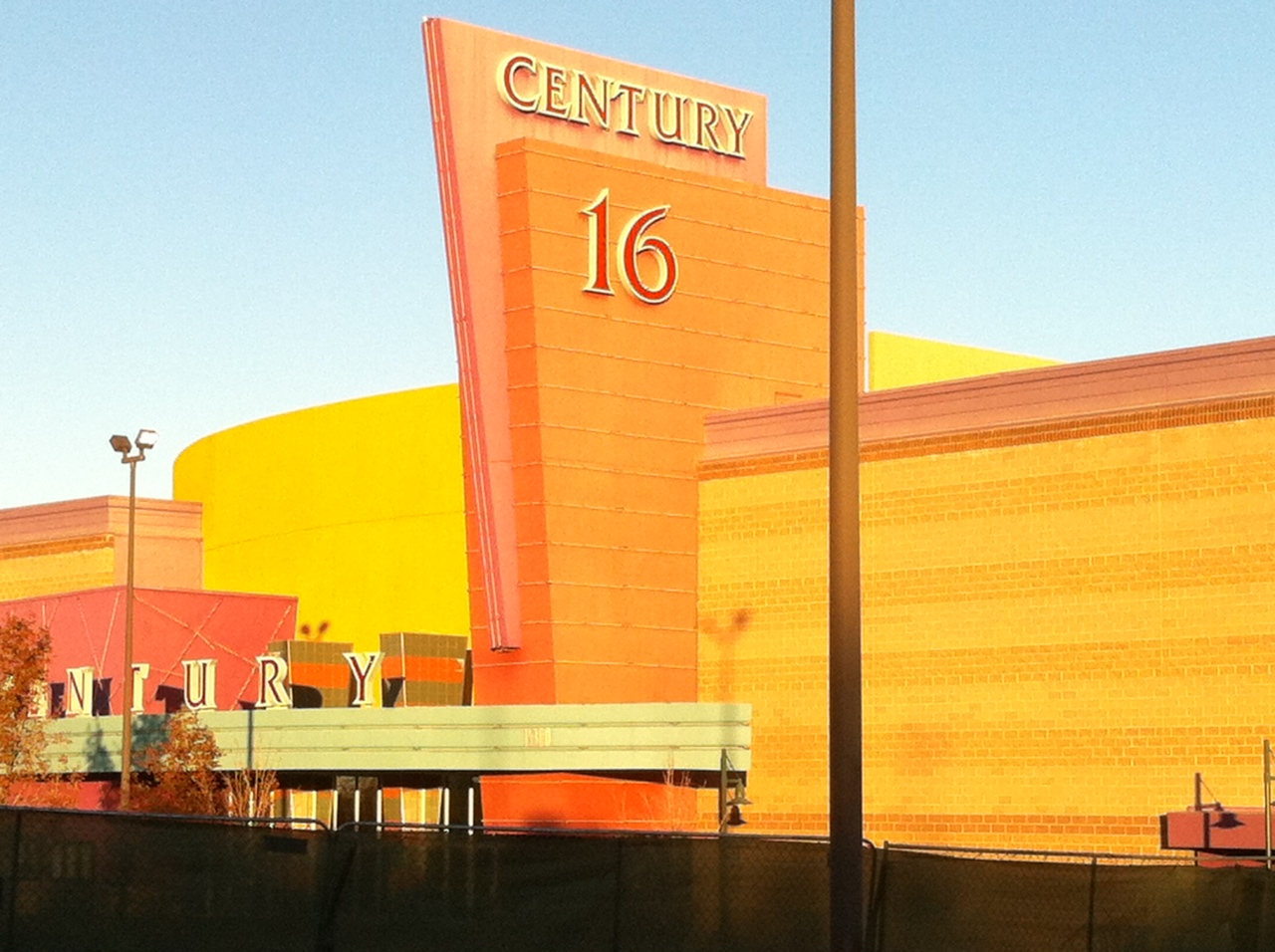
Century 16 Theatre later the same year of the 2012 shooting

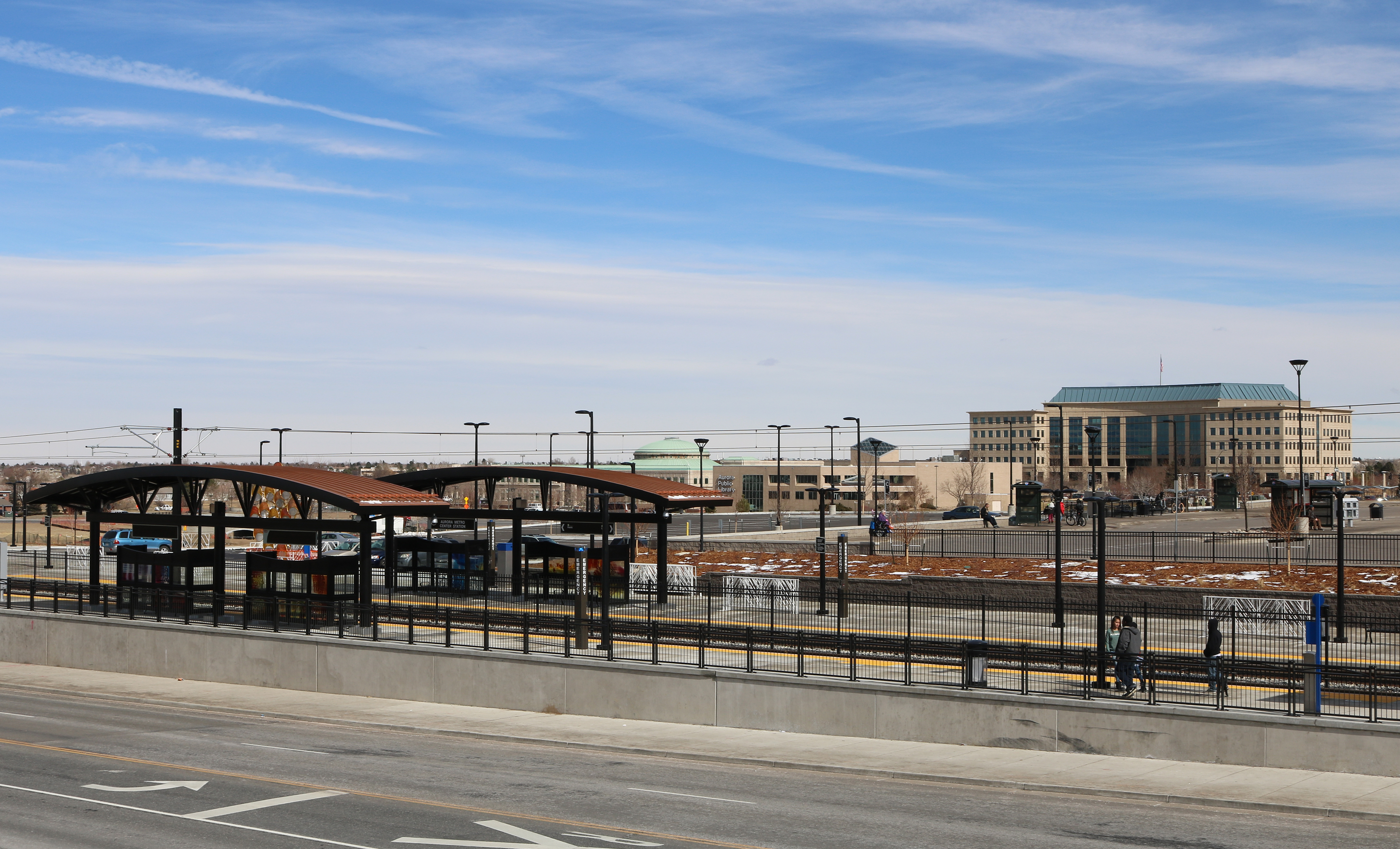
Aurora Metro Center Station across the street from the mall on the east side
