= Century Theatres =

Movie theater chain in the western United States

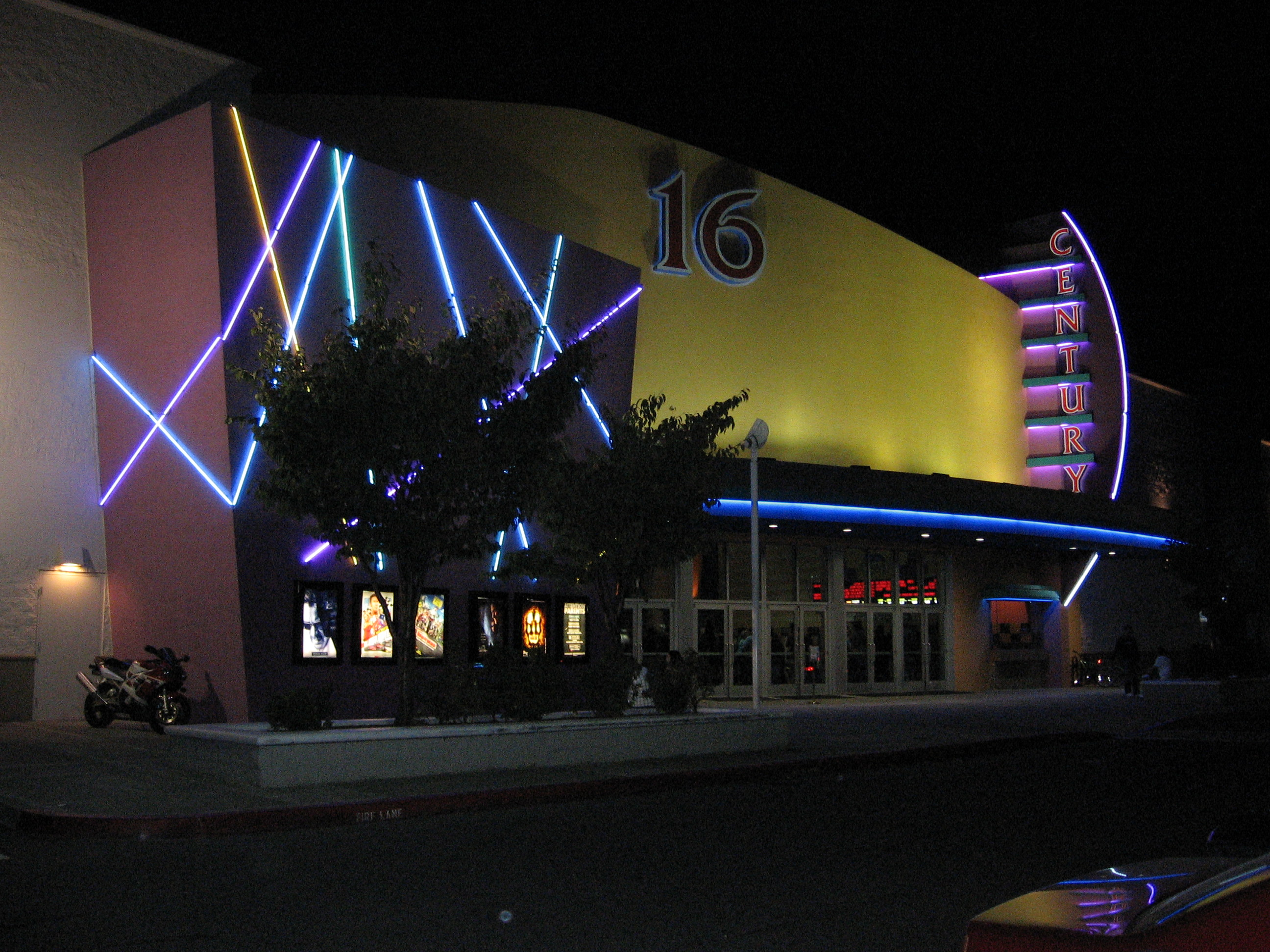
- A Century Theatre multiplex in Portland, Oregon, seen at night
- Formerly: Syufy Enterprises (1941-1995)
- Type: Subsidiary
- Industry: Entertainment (movie theaters)
- Founded: 1941; 85 years ago, in Vallejo, California
- Founder: Raymond W. Syufy
- Defunct: August 8, 2006; 20 years ago (as a separate chain, now a brand)
- Headquarters: San Rafael, California
- Parent: Cinemark Theatres (2006–present)
- Website: cinemark.com

Century Theatres is a movie theater chain that operates many multiplexes in the western United States, primarily in California, Colorado, Nevada, Utah, New Mexico, and Arizona. In its later years, it had expanded into the inter-mountain states, the Pacific Northwest, Texas, Alaska and parts of the Midwestern United States. Founded in 1941, the chain was headquartered in San Rafael, California, until it was acquired by Cinemark Theatres from Plano, Texas, in 2006. Many now-Cinemark-owned theaters continue to operate under the Century brand.

== History ==
The Century Theater chain was originally named Syufy Enterprises, for its founder Raymond Syufy, Senior, who built his first theater in Vallejo, California, in 1941. The first Century theater was the Century 21 in San Jose, California, which opened November 24, 1964, adjacent to the Winchester Mystery House. The Century 21 theater was built to showcase Cinerama type movies (the left and right empty projection booths are still present), but in fact, it showed only 70mm movies. The screen was later replaced with a flat model, and has remained intact as a throwback to the domed Cinerama palaces of the 1960s. The "Century 21" name was a tactic used to convey to the viewing public a "futuristic image". This image is bolstered by the lobby's distinct modern "bubbled lights" and metallic gold accents. The large orange metal ornament on the top of the domed-theater was functional in addition to being decorative—theater employees rappelled from it when the dome's outer track-lighting needed to be maintained. The first film presented at the Century 21 was It's a Mad, Mad, Mad, Mad World in 70mm format.

A Century Theatres location in Oregon in 2011

The company started using the name "Century Theatres" in 1995.

Century Theatres has a long history of litigation against its much larger competitor, AMC Theatres, for alleged anti-competitive behavior. However, since the late 1990s, both sides have generally refrained from suing each other.

On August 8, 2006, Texas-based chain Cinemark Theatres announced that it had completed a purchase agreement under which Century Theatres would be acquired with a combination of cash and stock from Cinemark's parent company. The transition to Cinemark was completed on Thursday, October 5, 2006, with the exception of the Century 24, which was transferred back to its original company, Syufy Enterprises. In early 2013, it was announced that Century 21, 22, 23, and 24 theaters were soon to be redeveloped. The company's drive-in theaters and swap meets were also not part of the merger and also reverted to Syufy Enterprises ownership. They now operate under the brand name "West Wind Drive-Ins and Public Markets".

In January 2014, Century 24 was closed and demolished. At the end of March, the 50-year lease for Century 21, 22, and 23 ended and was not renewed, and the theaters closed. A preservation movement, which began the year before, was successful in getting City Historic Landmark status for the very first - the Century 21 - as a prime local example of Mid Century Modern architecture. It was also Placed on the California Register of Historical Resources, and deemed "eligible" to be placed on the National Register of Historic Places. Century 22 and 23 were demolished in 2019 and have been replaced by a parking garage and parking lot, respectively, while the former site of Century 24 has yet to be redeveloped.

=== 2012 shooting ===
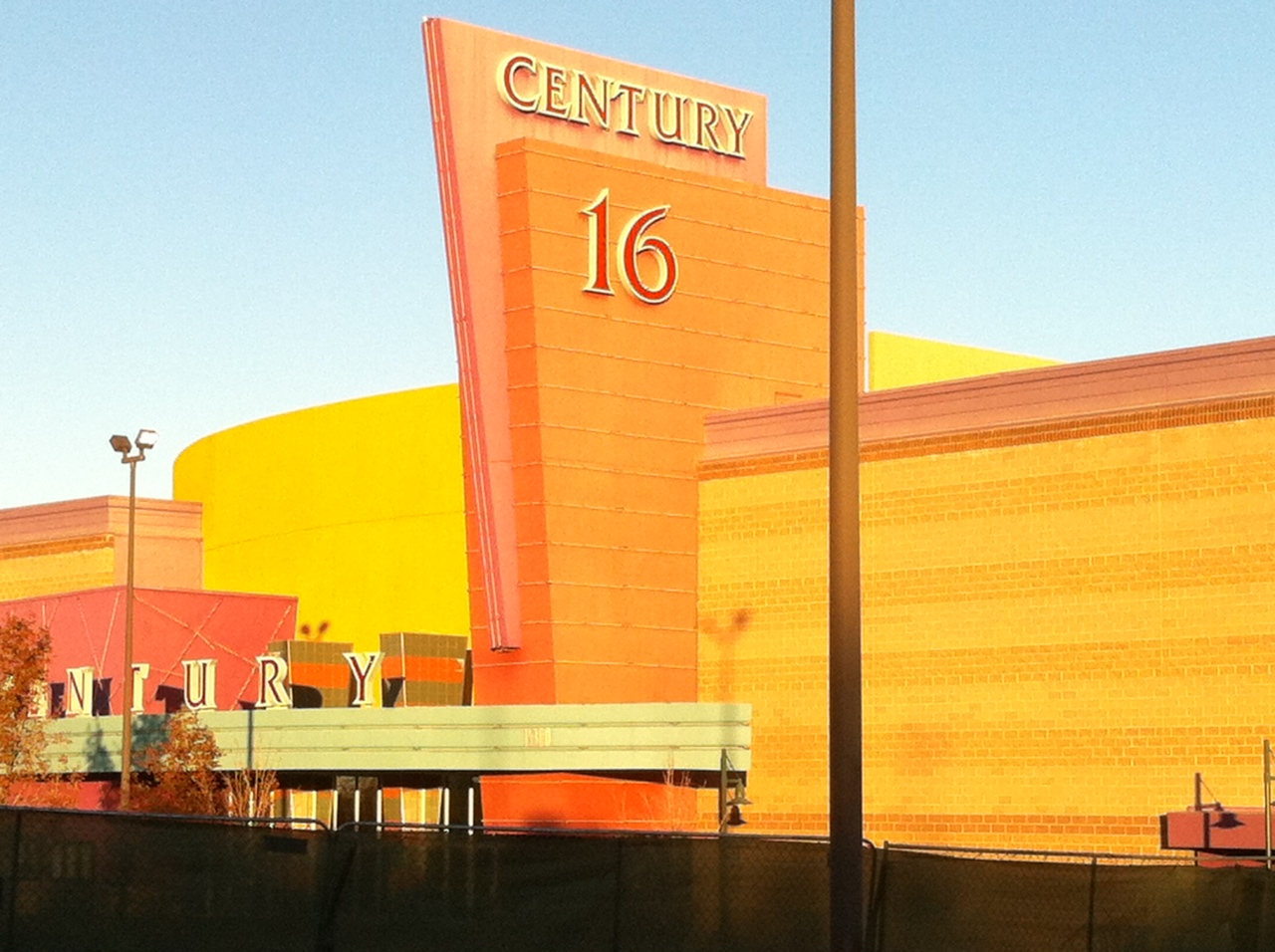
The Aurora 16 theater, three months after the shooting

On July 20, 2012, in Aurora, Colorado, during a midnight showing of the movie The Dark Knight Rises, gunman James Eagan Holmes, shot at viewers in Theater 9 at the Century 16 theater, killing 12 people and injuring 70 others.

Cinemark held an "evening of remembrance" at the remodeled theater on January 17, 2013, inviting elected officials, victims and relatives of victims, after which movies were shown without charge. The theater reopened permanently on January 25. Theater 9 at Century Aurora is now a Cinemark XD Theatre. Instead of numbers, theaters are now identified by letters; for example, the Theater 9 is now Theater I, and Theater 8 is now Theater H.

== Cinemark XD ==
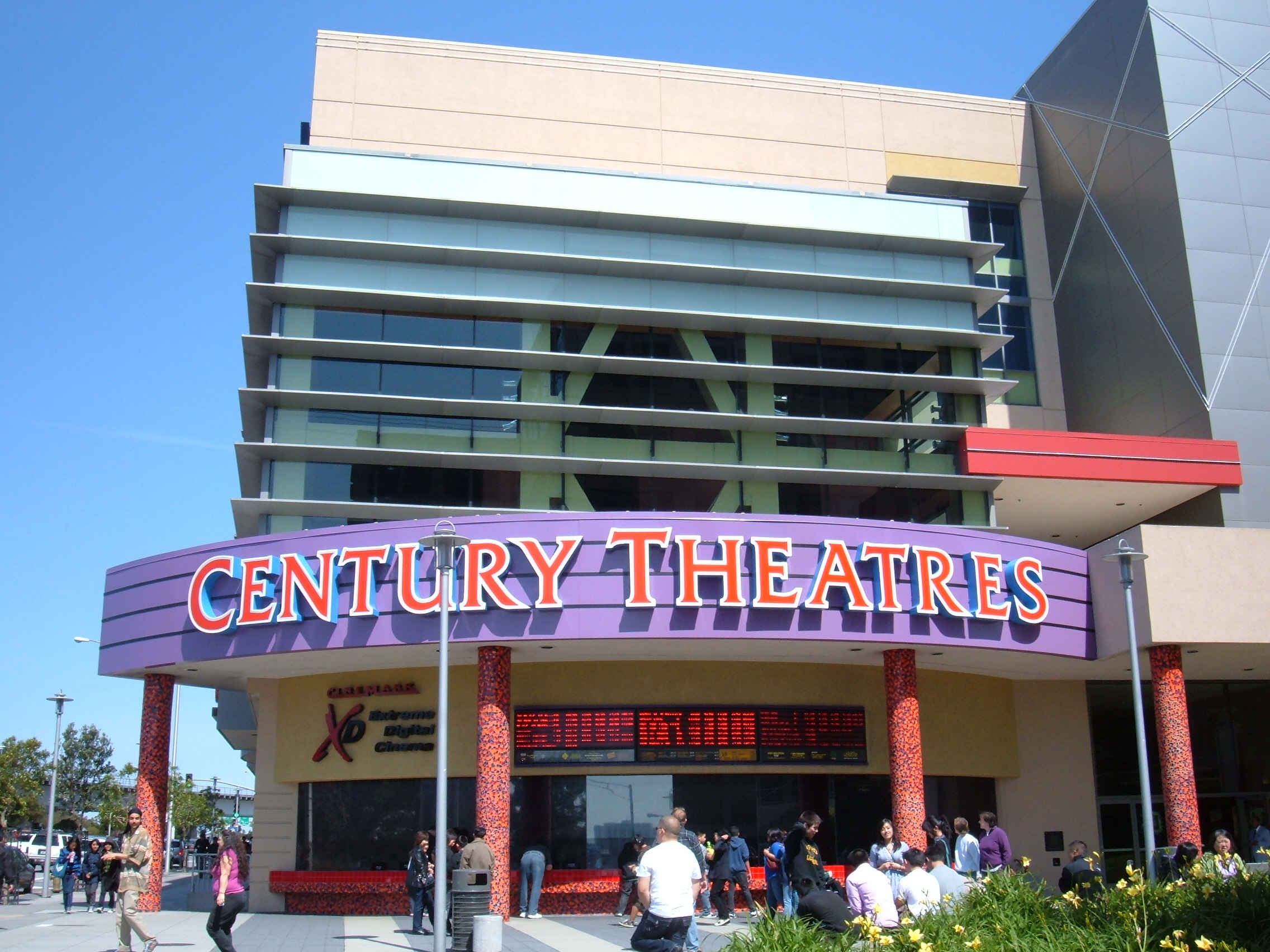
Century 20 megaplex located in Daly City, California

In 2009, Cinemark introduced XD (standing for Extreme Digital Cinema), the company's response to IMAX. The first XD auditorium was completed at the Century Theatre in the Westfield San Francisco Center by Moorefield Construction, Inc. Extreme Digital allows Cinemark to play any film and display any aspect ratio, unlike IMAX which requires special formatting. Because of this, Cinemark can play a different movie in their XD auditoriums whenever they want, while IMAX usually plays the same movie for weeks. There are currently 217 Century and Cinemark Theatres equipped with XD. The technology employs a larger screen, up to 38′ × 70′, with additional improvements in audio and digital projection. The projector can project either 2D or 3D from digital cinema sources. As of May 2023, Cinemark operates 168 XD auditoriums. More than 25% of the XD auditoriums are located in the California market.

Shortly after its introduction, IMAX filed a lawsuit against Cinemark, claiming that Cinemark stole trade secrets from them that ultimately went into the creation of XD.

In recent years, XD has also been licensed to the Pacific Theatres chain, and is currently being used at its Winnetka screen in Los Angeles as well as at the Grove in Hollywood, Los Angeles.

In May 2018, Cinemark announced that over 200 XD auditoriums in the United States and Latin America would be equipped with THX sound. This allows audiences to enjoy uncompromised audio and video quality in an environment that fully complements the cinematic experience. THX works closely with exhibitor partners to meet THX-certified cinema specifications, focusing on auditorium architecture, acoustics, audio and projection equipment calibration and speaker configuration. Recertification is conducted annually by a THX certificated technician to ensure the cinema continues to meet THX certification requirements year after year.
