= Gun laws in Colorado =

Location of Colorado in the United States

Gun laws in Colorado regulate the sale, possession, and use of firearms and ammunition in the state of Colorado in the United States. Colorado has historically had relatively permissive firearms laws. Following a rash of mass shootings within the state over the past decade, the Colorado General Assembly has enacted increasingly restrictive firearms laws.

== Summary table ==
Subject / law	Long guns	Handguns	Relevant statutes	Notes
State permit required to purchase?	No*	No*	Colo. Rev. Stat. § 18-12-116	Effective August 1st, 2026, it is unlawful to buy or sell "specified semiautomatic firearms" unless having obtained a Firearm Safety Course Eligibility Card and then completed a "basic firearms safety course" and/or an "extended firearms safety course". "Specified semiautomatic firearms" includes most semiautomatic firearms.
Firearm registration?	No	No	Colo. Rev. Stat. § 29-11.7-102	
Semi-automatic rifles	No*	No*	DRMC § 38-130	No state law prohibiting sale or possession of Semi-automatic firearms, but with the repeal of Colorado's statewide firearm preemption law in 2021, local restrictions or prohibitions on semi-automatic may exist. Denver ordinance bans "assault weapons" (Most semi-auto rifles with more than 21 round magazines). Vail banned "assault weapons" in 1994. Boulder city passed such an ordinance in May 2018.
Magazine capacity restriction?	Yes	Yes	Colo. Rev. Stat. §§ 18-12-302, 18-12-303	After July 1, 2013, magazines holding more than 15 rounds may not be sold, transferred, or possessed unless they were lawfully owned prior to July 1, 2013. Firearms with a tubular magazine which are either chambered in .22 rimfire or operated by lever action are exempt from this regulation, as are magazines "permanently altered" to limit the capacity to 15 or fewer. Boulder city passed an ordinance in May 2018 banning magazines holding more than 10 rounds (15 for handguns). The town of Vail banned magazines holding 21 or more rounds in 1994. On June 29, 2020, the Colorado Supreme Court upheld the constitutionality of the magazine restrictions.
Owner license required?	No	No		
Permit required for concealed carry?	N/A	Yes	Colo. Rev. Stat. § 18-12-203	Colorado is a shall issue state for concealed carry. Permits are issued by local sheriff offices to county residents.
Permit required for open carry?	No	No	Colo. Rev. Stat. § 18-12; DRMC §§ 38-117(b), 38-118	Legal without permit requirements except in Denver and other posted areas.
Concealed within a vehicle?	Yes	Yes	Colo. Rev. Stat. §§ 18-12-105(2b), 33-6-125; DRMC §§ 38-117(f), 38-118, 14-92	No permit is required. Pistols may be carried with chamber and magazine loaded. Rifles and shotguns must be carried with an empty chamber if the owner is in possession of a valid hunting license and that hunting season is in progress. Rounds in the magazine are permitted during that hunting season. A loaded weapon in a vehicle and a spotlight is prima facie evidence that one was attempting to illegally take game. Wildlife officers have full law enforcement powers.
State preemption of local restrictions?	partial	partial	Colo. Rev. Stat. § 29-11.7-103	Local ordinances are not preempted by state law, and Denver bans assault weapons and open carry. However, holders of concealed carry permits are exempt from most, but not all, local restrictions.
NFA weapons restricted?	No	No	CRS § 18-12-102	NFA items are defined as a "dangerous weapon". Subsection 5: "It shall be an affirmative defense to the charge of possessing a dangerous weapon...that said person has a valid permit and license for possession of such weapon."
Peaceable Journey laws?	Yes	Yes	Colo. Rev. Stat. § 18-12-105.6; DRMC §§ 38-117(f), 38-118	Denver's restrictions on transport/possession of firearms in vehicles do not apply to persons traveling to or from other jurisdictions; see Trinen v. City & County of Denver, 53 P.3d 754
Castle Doctrine?	Yes	Yes	Colo. Rev. Stat. § 18-1-704.5	A legal resident of a property has the right to use deadly force to defend themselves, other occupants, and property from armed or unarmed intruders.
Stand Your Ground Law?	Yes	Yes	Common Law Doctrine	“The common-law doctrine of retreat to the wall . . . is applicable in this jurisdiction only to such cases as where the defendant voluntarily enters into a fight or where the parties engage in mutual combat, or where the defendant, being the assailant, does not endeavor in good faith to decline any further struggle before firing the fatal shot, and possibly to other similar cases.”
Red flag law?	Yes	Yes	HB 19-1177	The police may temporarily confiscate firearms from people who are threatening to harm themselves or others or have been accused of the same by someone who resides at the same address of the subject, and then get a court order afterwards.
Waiting Period?	Yes	Yes	HB23-1219; Colo. Rev. Stat. § 18-12-115	Effective October 1, 2023, there is a mandatory three day waiting period between initiation of a background check and taking possession on most firearms transfers. Exceptions include antique firearms and transfers between family members.

== Right to keep and bear arms in Colorado ==
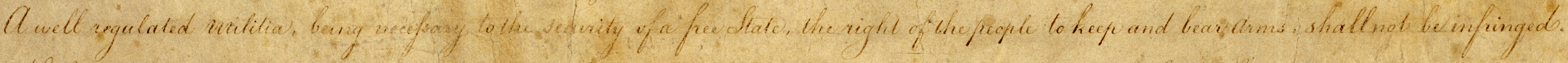
United States Constitution, Second Amendment

An individual's right to keep and bear arms in Colorado is protected by both the Second Amendment to the United States Constitution and Article II, Section 13 of the Constitution of Colorado. The Second Amendment provides:

A well regulated Militia, being necessary to the security of a free State, the right of the people to keep and bear Arms, shall not be infringed.

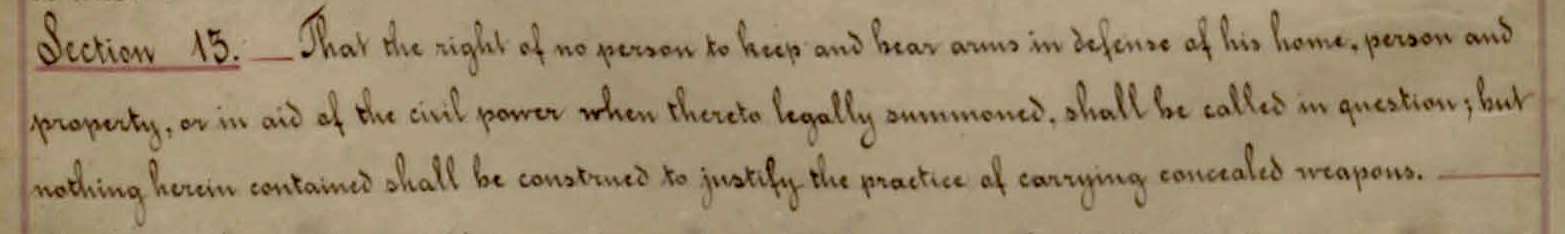
Colorado Constitution, Article II, Section 13

Article II, Section 13 provides:

That the right of no person to keep and bear arms in defense of his home, person and property, or in aid of the civil power when thereto legally summoned, shall be called in question; but nothing herein contained shall be construed to justify the practice of carrying concealed weapons.

Colorado is one of only seven states which has a clause excluding concealed carry from its state right to bear arms provision. Two other states previously had an analogous clause in their constitution but have since removed it.

The government may regulate the exercise of the right to keep and bear arms protected by Article II, Section 13 under its inherent police power as long as the exercise of that power is "reasonable". However, Article II, Section 13 “does not tolerate government enactments that have either a purpose or effect of rendering the right to bear arms in self-defense a nullity.”

== Open carry ==
Article II, Section 13 explicitly exempts the practice of carrying concealed weapons from its protection. Legal scholar David B. Kopel has observed, "[e]xpressly giving the government power over concealed bearing of arms means that the government does not have a similar power over openly bearing arms, or over keeping arms." As such, open carry is generally permitted in the state. However, local governments may prohibit open carry to a limited extent only in areas that are directly under the jurisdiction of the municipality such as municipal buildings, police stations, etc. If such an ordinance is written all locations affected must be posted per C.R.S 29-11.7-104. The exception is the city and county of Denver has done so in a broad sense banning open carry in all areas of the city and county. The Colorado Supreme Court ruled that Denver's pre-existing ban may remain in force, despite the Colorado legislature's enactment of a statewide pre-emption law designed to establish uniform firearms policies across the state. When a rifle or shotgun is transported in a vehicle, there may not be a round in the chamber.

== Concealed carry ==
The right to bear arms protected by Article II, Section 13 of the state constitution does not extend to concealed carry. However, the Colorado General Assembly has created a statutory right to concealed carry for legal residents who meet certain objective criteria. As such, Colorado is considered a "shall-issue" state.

Knowingly carrying a concealed firearm on or about one's person without a permit is a crime. A firearm is considered "concealed" when it is “placed out of sight so as not to be discernible or apparent by ordinary observation.” A firearm is considered "about the person" when it is “sufficiently close to the person to be readily accessible for immediate use.”

A concealed handgun permit is issued by the sheriff of the county where the applicant resides, and is valid for five years. Applicants must demonstrate competence with a handgun, either by passing a training class or by other means. The Concealed Carry Act allows a person with a permit to carry a concealed weapon "in all areas of the state" with the exception of some federal properties, K-12 schools, and buildings with fixed security checkpoints such as courthouses, and also disallows a local government from enforcing an ordinance or resolution that conflicts with the law.

In March 2012, the Colorado Supreme Court struck down the University of Colorado's campus gun ban, saying it violated the Concealed Carry Act, which allows permit holders to carry on public property, including carrying on public colleges.

=== Criteria for obtaining a concealed handgun permit ===
To obtain a concealed handgun permit in Colorado, an applicant must:

- Be a legal resident of Colorado;
- Be at least 21 years old;
- Not be prohibited from possessing a firearm under state or federal law;
- Not have been convicted of perjury related to an application for a concealed handgun permit;
- Not be an alcoholic unless determined to be a recovering alcoholic by a licensed counselor and have not used alcohol for at least 3 years;
- Not be an unlawful user of or be addicted to a controlled substance;
- Not be subject to a protection order; and
- Have demonstrated competence with a handgun.

Even if an applicant meets all of these criteria, a sheriff may still deny the application, "if the sheriff has a reasonable belief that documented previous behavior by the applicant makes it likely the applicant will present a danger to self or others if the applicant receives a permit to carry." In practice, these discretionary denials are quite rare (e.g., there were 71 discretionary denials out of 75,504 applications in 2021). Nevertheless, giving sheriffs this kind of open-ended discretion to deny permits likely violates the Second Amendment.

=== Reciprocity with other states ===
Colorado will honor a valid concealed carry permit issued by another state if:

- The issuing state recognizes permits issued by Colorado;
- The permit holder is at least 21 years old; and
- The permit holder is a resident of the issuing state or has been a resident of Colorado for less than 90 days.

Colorado has established concealed carry reciprocity with 33 other states, namely: Alabama, Alaska, Arizona, Arkansas, Delaware, Florida, Georgia, Idaho, Iowa, Indiana, Kansas, Kentucky, Louisiana, Michigan, Mississippi, Missouri, Montana, Nebraska, New Hampshire, New Mexico, North Carolina, North Dakota, Ohio, Oklahoma, Pennsylvania, South Dakota, Tennessee, Texas, Utah, Virginia, West Virginia, Wisconsin and Wyoming. This includes every state that shares a border with Colorado.

Colorado has not established concealed carry reciprocity with 17 other states: California, Connecticut, District of Columbia, Hawaii, Illinois, Maine, Maryland, Massachusetts, Minnesota, Nevada, New Jersey, New York, Oregon, Rhode Island, South Carolina, Vermont and Washington. The lack of reciprocity with these states is due to the fact that they do not honor Colorado permits. Minnesota, Nevada, and South Carolina do not honor Colorado permits because Colorado does not require live-fire training. In Maine and Vermont it is legal to carry a concealed weapon without a permit. The remaining 12 states do not honor permits from any other state.

=== Concealed handgun permit statistics ===
Sheriffs are required to prepare an annual report specifying the number applications received, the number of permits issued, the number of permits denied, the reasons for denial, the number of revocations, and the reasons for the revocations. As of 2022, a total of 294,359 individuals hold a valid concealed handgun permit, which is about 6.41% of the adult population. The average monthly crime rate for the general population in 2022 was 530.3 per 100,000 whereas the rate for permit holders was 5.7 per 100,000. This data consistently shows that permit holders are one of the most law abiding segments of society.

Year	Total applications	Permits issued			Permits denied						Permits revoked					
Year	Total applications	Total	Application type		Total	Reason					Total	Reason				
Year	Total applications	Total	New	Renewals	Total	Arrest record	Discretionary	Residency	Restraining order	Mental illness/ addiction	Total	Arrest record	Discretionary	Residency	Restraining order	Mental illness/ addiction
2022	54,683	53,653	27,031	26,622	355	145	87	13	69	41	416	202	14	34	144	22
2021	75,504	74,114	41,660	32,454	484	255	71	24	82	52	289	168	11	3	90	17
2020	63,043	61,050	37,909	23,141	402	167	124	16	52	43	348	196	49	9	73	21
2019	50,039	47,723	23,250	24,473	382	169	113	20	45	35	377	237	17	4	91	28
2018	61,064	59,786	26,290	33,496	391	174	86	9	71	51	537	266	29	133	68	41
2017	46,888	46,394	27,122	19,272	372	130	111	33	57	41	508	281	35	94	64	34
2016	52,975	51,806	38,955	12,851	464	191	156	14	46	57	422	222	27	89	58	26
2015	39,485	37,436	25,906	11,530	278	140	74	8	35	21	373	228	26	56	47	16
2014	40,896	39,191	21,874	17,317	306	112	127	17	27	23	270	195	22	0	33	20
2013	58,012	59,091	46,053	13,038	462	205	166	11	44	36	329	202	37	36	42	12
2012	33,977	31,663	23,357	8,306	254	157	59	7	7	24	286	194	22	12	41	17
2011	20,197	18,948			238	143	57	15	15	8	291	208	30	16	29	8
2010	19,372	18,088			262	133	71	8	37	13	250	167	22	15	30	16
2009	27,402	26,644			374	202	115	12	35	10	234	160	21	20	20	13
2008	20,998	17,695			221	138	41	12	25	5	138	93	16	6	16	7
2007	9,880	9,370			141	77	39	4	12	9	184	140	16	2	19	7
2006	6,649	6,241			102	48	39	7	4	4	131	95	5	12	15	4

== Magazine capacity limits ==
As of July 1, 2013, it is illegal to sell, transfer, or possess a magazine that is "capable of accepting, or that is designed to be readily converted to accept, more than fifteen rounds of ammunition." However, magazines owned before that date were grandfathered as long the owner has maintained continuous possession. This law is silent on non-residents visiting Colorado while in possession of large capacity magazines, provided they are for personal use, and the individual had lawfully obtained them according to the laws of his or her home state.

The enforceability of these restrictions is questionable, given that Colorado did not require grandfathered magazines to be registered with the state. Complicating matters, magazine manufacturers generally do not print serial numbers or a date of manufacture on the magazines they produce. Therefore, it would be virtually impossible to prove at trial that one illegally possessed an LCM unless someone witnessed that person obtaining or importing the illegal magazine. Gun stores have effectively found a way around this law by selling disassembled magazine parts kits.

=== Colorado Outfitters Ass'n v. Hickenlooper (2016) ===
A lawsuit over the legality of the magazine ban and background check laws was filed by 54 of the 64 elected county Sheriffs and 21 sporting and outdoor groups and Colorado companies. The suit alleged that the large-capacity magazine ban violated the Second and Fourteenth Amendments, and argued that the law would be impossible to enforce.

In Colorado Outfitters Ass'n v. Hickenlooper, 823 F.3d 537 (10th Cir. 2016), the Tenth Circuit held that the plaintiffs lacked standing to challenge the constitutionality of the state law banning magazines capable of holding more than 15 rounds on Second Amendment grounds.

=== Rocky Mountain Gun Owners v. Polis (2020) ===
In Rocky Mountain Gun Owners v. Polis, 467 P.3d 314 (Colo. 2020), the Colorado Supreme Court held that the state law banning magazines capable of holding more than 15 rounds did not violate Article II, Section 13 of the Colorado Constitution. The plaintiffs did not challenge the law on Second Amendment grounds.

== Universal background checks ==
Effective July 1, 2013, Colorado requires background checks for all firearm sales at the buyer's expense. Without exception, all transferees must complete a background check before they can obtain a firearm from a licensed gun dealer. Transferees must also complete a background check in order to obtain a firearm from a private individual. However, this does not apply to bona fide gifts or loans between immediate family members, transfers that occur by operation of law, temporary transfers that occur while in the home of a transferee who is not a prohibited person and reasonably fears imminent death or serious bodily injury, temporary transfers for target shooting or hunting, temporary transfers for repair or maintenance, temporary transfers that occur in the continuous presence of the owner, and temporary transfers for not more than seventy-two hours.

== Restricted weapon types ==
Colorado imposes criminal penalties only when individuals manufacture, possess, or sell machine guns in violation of federal law.

Effective August 1st, 2026, "specified semiautomatic firearms" will require purchasers to obtain a Firearm Safety Course Eligibility Card, pay fees to Colorado Parks & Wildlife, and complete classes defined by statute. Firearms defined as such are most semiautomatic firearms which accept a detachable magazine, with limited exclusions for certain firearms which do not accept a detachable magazine, certain rimfire firearms, curio & relic firearms older than 50 years, handguns with recoil operation, and a list of specific rifles by model which are exempt. Gun rights activists argue the enhanced training and permitting requirements for acquiring semi-automatic weapons with detachable magazines is effectively an assault weapon ban, given the burdensome training and vetting requirements and fees to purchase such firearms, which in years past had bills targeting them for ban or restriction. In drafting SB25-003 the Colorado General Assembly found complicated feature tests of previous bans to be ineffective and decided in favor of a single, common feature: ability to accept a detachable magazine. Colorado's Specified Semiautomatic Firearms law does not restrict possession of such firearms. Additionally, the Specified Semiautomatic Firearms law does not require semiautomatic firearms that meet the law's criteria to be registered with the state for someone to maintain lawful possession of such weapons.

== Second Amendment sanctuaries ==
As of 2020, 39 of Colorado's 64 counties (60%) have passed resolutions declaring themselves to be "Second Amendment sanctuaries", namely: Alamosa, Archuleta, Baca, Bent, Cheyenne, Conejos, Crowley, Custer, Delta, Dolores, Douglas, El Paso, Elbert, Fremont, Garfield, Huerfano, Jackson, Kiowa, Kit Carson, Lincoln, Logan, Mesa, Mineral, Moffat, Montezuma, Montrose, Otero, Park, Phillips, Prowers, Rio Blanco, Rio Grande, Sedgwick, Teller, Washington, Weld, and Yuma. Most of these counties did so in response to the red flag law that was adopted on April 12, 2019 and went into effect on January 1, 2020.

== Preemption ==
From 2003 to 2021, Colorado had state preemption of local firearm laws, except for certain ordinances enacted by the City and County of Denver. The statewide firearm preemption law was repealed in 2021, allowing cities and counties to enact firearms ordinances that are more restrictive than state law. Denver has enacted local firearms ordinances that are more restrictive than state law, and other cities (notably Boulder) are considering additional local firearm restrictions. Meanwhile, a growing number of rural counties are using the repeal of Colorado's statewide firearm pre-emption law as the basis for their refusal to enforce portions of the state's firearm laws (notably Colorado's red flag law) within their jurisdictions.

Concealed carry permits remain valid statewide, despite the repeal of statewide pre-emption. In other words, local jurisdictions cannot completely ban concealed carry by permit-holders within their jurisdictions, although they may restrict concealed carry by permit holders in public buildings and parks, or in designated areas when special events or large public gatherings are held. However, local jurisdictions may enact ordinances restricting or outlawing open carry (which requires no permit in Colorado) within their boundaries, and the City and County of Denver has done so.

=== Boulder ===
The City of Boulder unanimously passed 6 new gun control ordinances in June 2022. These measures were drafted with the assistance of the Giffords Law Center to Prevent Gun Violence and Everytown for Gun Safety.

=== Boulder County ===
Boulder County adopted new gun control measures on August 2, 2022.

=== Denver ===
Denver law bans assault weapons and the open carry of firearms. In 2003, the Colorado General Assembly passed laws preempting these and several other pre-existing Denver laws, which Denver successfully challenged in Denver District Court in 2004. In 2006, the Colorado Supreme Court let stand the District Court order upholding the Denver laws. In 2022, Denver City Council bans concealed carry guns in all city's properties.

=== Louisville ===
The City of Louisville adopted new gun control measures on July 7, 2022.

=== Superior ===
The Town of Superior adopted new gun control measures in June 2022.

== See also ==
- Law of Colorado
- Government of Denver
- Gun laws in the United States
- Hunting license
