= Cinemark Theatres =

American movie theater chain

Cinemark Holdings, Inc.
- Logo used since 2022
- Formerly: Cinemark Corporation (1977–1984); Cinemark, Inc. (1984–2007)
- Type: Public
- Traded as: NYSE: CNK; S&P 600 component
- ISIN: US17243V1026
- Founded: February 6, 1977; 49 years ago
- Founder: Lee Roy Mitchell
- Headquarters: Plano, Texas, United States
- Number of locations: 497 (304 U.S., 193 Latin America) (March 2025)
- Key people: Lee Roy Mitchell (chairman); Sean Gamble (president and CEO)
- Brands: CinéArts; Cinemark; Cinemark XD; Movie Bistro; Scene Restaurant & Lounge; Reserve Kitchen & Bar; Studio Eats Kitchen & Bar; The Premier; Neo Kitchen & Bar; CUT! by Cinemark; Gamescape by Cinemark
- Revenue: ▲US$3.12 billion (2025)
- Net income: ▼US$138 million (2025)
- Number of employees: c. 18,800 (2024)
- Subsidiaries: Century Theatres; Tinseltown USA; CinéArts; Rave Cinemas
- Website: cinemark.com

Cinemark Holdings, Inc. (stylized as CineMark from 1998 until 2022 and in all caps since 2022) is an American movie theater chain that started operations in 1977 and since then has operated theaters with hundreds of locations throughout the Americas. It is headquartered in Plano, Texas, in the Dallas–Fort Worth area. As of June 30, 2026 Cinemark operates 495 theaters with 5,620 screens, including 301 theaters with 4,219 screens across 42 U.S. states and 194 theaters with 1,401 screens in 13 countries across Central and South America. It is also the largest movie theater chain in Brazil, with a 30 percent market share.

Cinemark operates theaters under several brands, including its flagship Cinemark, Century Theatres, Tinseltown USA, CinéArts, Rave Cinemas and Gamescape.

== History ==
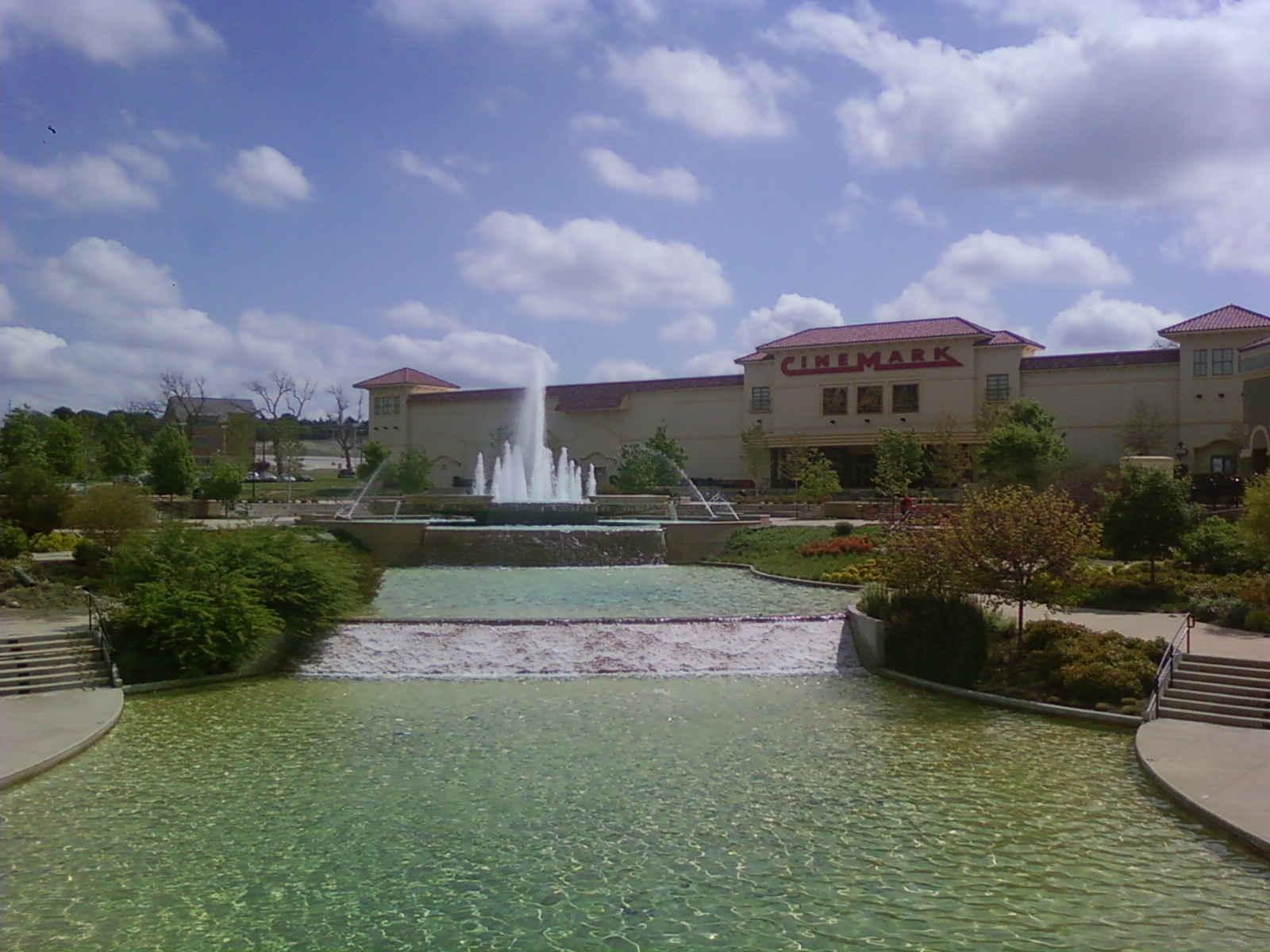
Cinemark 12 Rockwall at The Harbor in Rockwall, Texas in April, 2010. It was expanded in 2019 into Cinemark 14 Rockwall and XD.

Logo used from 1998 until 2022, and on its international branches until 2023

Cinemark was started by Lee Roy Mitchell as a chain of theatres in California, Texas and Utah. The roots of the company date to the 1960s when brothers J.C. and Lee Roy Mitchell created Mitchell Theatres, Inc. By 1972, the company was named Texas Cinema Corporation. Lee Roy Mitchell then formed a group of theaters under the Cinemark name beginning in 1977. Cinemark Corporation and Texas Cinema Corporation merged operations in June 1979 creating a portfolio of 25 theaters in Texas and New Mexico under the Cinemark brand. On March 26, 1980, Henry G. Plitt of Plitt Theatres Holdings purchased the Cinemark circuit of theaters. But Cinemark Corporation continued operations acquiring existing theaters and began to build new theaters. In 1987, Cinemark acquired all of the Plitt Theatres.

With the opening of the Movies 8 on 3912 Hampton Road in Texarkana, Texas, in 1987, Cinemark began building theaters with colorful interiors and large video game arcades. Legal advertisements indicate that the company known as Cinemark USA, Incorporated, officially began December 31, 1987.

First policy trailer for Cinemark Theatres

The following year, Cinemark introduced its Front Row Joe mascot created by San Antonio-based independent animation studio Wilming Reams Animation. This animated cat appeared in policy trailers and on kids' concession products. The mascot was retired in 1998 when Cinemark had begun to open Art Deco-style theatres, and was revived in 2004 for its 20th anniversary, and again in 2018 with a CGI look, darker orange color and the beige color being added. In 1992, Cinemark opened a new theater concept called Hollywood USA in Garland, Texas; this concept was subsequently refined into the Tinseltown USA brand of theaters, which were much bigger than what Cinemark had previously built.

The following year, Cinemark expanded to Latin America with the opening of a six-screen theater in Santiago, Chile. The next year, they opened four theaters in Mexico and in 1997 opened their first theater in Brazil. By 2000, it was the largest exhibitor in Brazil (180 screens), Chile (89 screens; 50% market share) and El Salvador (25 screens; 60–70% market share) and had 192 screens in Mexico, as well as theaters in Argentina, Colombia, Costa Rica, Ecuador, Honduras, Nicaragua and Peru.

In 1998, Cinemark announced that it would replace its bright color interiors with what Cinemark characterized as a more classic Art Deco design. Through new theatre construction and acquisitions, it became the third largest theatre chain in the United States and the second largest theatre chain in the world. Mitchell's son Kevin Mitchell worked with the company as an executive until leaving in 2007 to found ShowBiz Cinemas. In 2013, Cinemark decided to sell all of its Mexican theaters to Cinemex.

Cinemark has a deal with Universal in which movies that gross more than $50 million domestically during their first weekend in theaters will continue to be shown in theaters exclusively for five weekends, or 31 days. After that, while theaters can continue to screen a film, the title becomes available on online rental platforms such as Apple TV and Amazon Prime Video.

Cinemark introduced a new premium offering, Cinemark XD, standing for Extreme Digital Cinema in 2009. The first XD screen opened at the Century San Francisco Centre 9 theater in San Francisco, California. This auditorium features a giant, wall-to-wall and floor-to-ceiling display, Barco 4K digital or laser projection with 2D and RealD 3D capabilities, 11.1 multi-channel or Dolby Atmos surround sound audio systems, and premium seats. On May 4, 2017, it was announced that THX sound systems would be coming to the XD locations as part of a collaboration with Cinemark. The Razer-owned company was hired to certify over 200 XD auditoriums in the United States and Latin America. It took a year to finish the update and certification. On May 2, 2018, Cinemark confirmed that the XD screens had become THX certified. Cinemark Holdings Inc (CNK) Reports Robust Revenue Growth and Solid Profitability in FY 2023.

=== United States Department of Justice lawsuits ===
In the 1990s, Cinemark Theatres was one of the first chains to incorporate stadium-style seating into its theatres. In 1997, several disabled individuals filed a lawsuit against Cinemark, alleging that their stadium-style seats forced patrons who used wheelchairs to sit in the front row of the theatre, effectively rendering them unable to see the screen without assuming a horizontal position. The case was heard in El Paso district court as Lara v. Cinemark USA, where a judge ruled that the architecture of Cinemark's theatres violated the Americans with Disabilities Act (ADA). The ruling was later overturned by the Fifth Circuit Court of Appeals, which ruled that Cinemark only had to provide an "unobstructed view" of the screen, and that since disabled patrons' view was only awkward and not actually obscured, Cinemark was not violating the law.

In response, the United States Department of Justice (DOJ) filed their own suit against Cinemark while appealing the appellate court's decision. The DOJ argued that, while Cinemark was not technically violating the ADA, it was nevertheless discriminating against disabled patrons by relegating them to the worst seats in the auditorium. Cinemark responded by filing a lawsuit against the Department of Justice, alleging misconduct on the DOJ's behalf. Cinemark's lawsuit was thrown out, and the Department of Justice proceeded with its lawsuit. Cinemark ultimately agreed to settle out of court before the court came to a ruling, agreeing with the DOJ that it was in the company's best interest to end litigation before a ruling was issued. Per the terms of the settlement, Cinemark agreed to renovate all existing theatres to provide patrons who used wheelchairs access to rows higher in its theatres, and also agreed that all future theatres would be constructed so as to allow handicapped patrons better access to higher rows. In turn, the Department of Justice agreed not to bring further litigation against the company in relation to the architecture of stadium seating as it applies to the ADA.

=== Aurora shooting ===
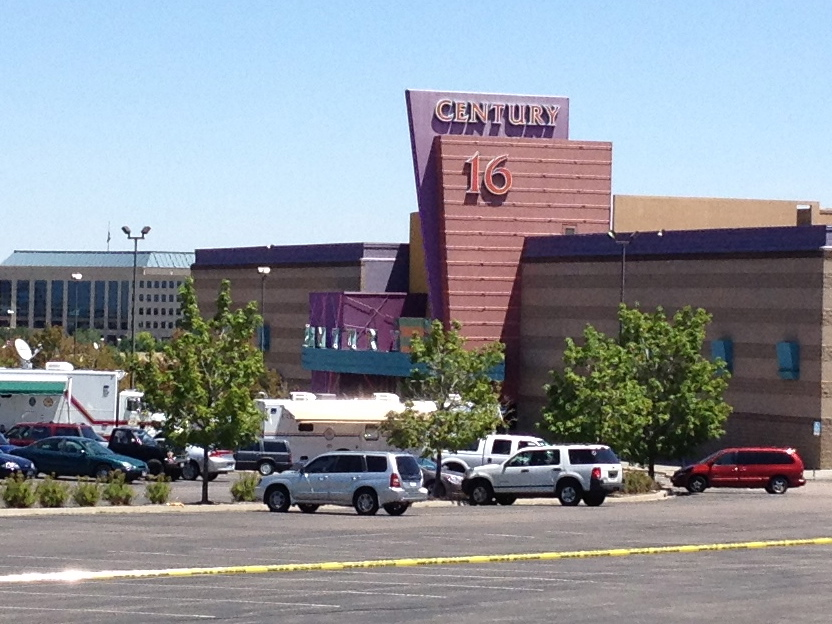
The Century 16 theater, taken on the day after the shooting

On July 20, 2012, a gunman opened fire during the midnight premiere of The Dark Knight Rises in a Century theater in Aurora, Colorado, killing 12 people and injuring 70 others. The gunman, later identified as James Eagan Holmes, who was believed to be acting alone, entered the theater dressed in protective clothing, set off tactical grenades, then opened fire with multiple firearms on the theatergoers. Counting both fatalities and injuries, the attack was the largest mass shooting in terms of number of casualties in United States history at the time. The theater was reopened on January 17, 2013.

The theater was sued by families of the victims, who alleged the theater should have taken greater measures to prevent the shooting. In May 2016, after years of legal debate, a jury took three hours to deliver a unanimous verdict that the theater chain was not liable. As the prevailing party in the judgment, Cinemark sought nearly US$700,000 from the plaintiffs to recover litigation expenses. In September 2016, after objections from the victims, Cinemark dropped all claims for reimbursement of legal fees. A separate lawsuit by victims was also dismissed in federal court when US District Judge R. Brooke Jackson ruled: "[James Holmes'] own premeditated and intentional actions were the predominant cause of the plaintiffs' losses."

In the wake of the 2018 school shooting in Parkland, Florida, Cinemark announced that it would no longer allow bags larger than 12 in × 12 in × 6 in (30 cm × 30 cm × 15 cm) in its theaters as a safety precaution.

=== 2020 temporary closure ===
On March 18, 2020, Cinemark temporarily closed all 345 of its theaters in the United States due to the COVID-19 pandemic. Cinemark released a statement describing the temporary closure "as a proactive measure in support of the health and safety of its employees, guests and communities." In light of the pandemic, a few dozen locations upgraded their box office stands, replacing them with digital kiosks for ticket purchases, and layed off many ushers working up front-end. Another reason was due to the plunging revenue in Q3 2020. The process of entirely replacing ushers with kiosks was pushed back to January 1, 2028.

In May 2021, CEO Mark Zoradi said that 98% of Cinemark's theaters in the United States had reopened. Due to government restrictions in Latin America, only half of the theaters in the region were operating. The company signed a deal with five major movie studios in an effort to increase attendance at theaters.

== Controversy ==
In 2008, Cinemark’s then CEO Alan Stock donated US$9,999 toward the successful passage of Proposition 8 in California. The initiative defined marriage as between a man and woman, thereby outlawing same-sex marriage in the state.

An ensuing campaign was launched by opponents of Prop 8, and encouraged patrons to see showings of the film Milk, based on the life of gay-rights activist Harvey Milk, at a competing theater rather than at Cinemark. Other activists urged a more general Cinemark boycott.

== Theater chains acquired ==
=== Century Theatres acquisition ===
On August 8, 2006, Cinemark purchased Century Theatres with a combination of cash and stock bonds. This acquisition added over 80 theatres and many more screens. Some of these theatres were subsequently shut down either being phased out as under performing or replaced with new complexes. The transaction was completed on October 5, 2006. With this purchase, Cinemark heavily strengthened their presence in Northern California and entered Alaska, Nevada, South Dakota, and Washington state, though at the transaction both of their locations in Washington state were still under construction. However, Cinemark retains the Century banner and continues to open new locations under that banner.

=== Muvico Theaters purchases ===
In 2009, in order to save the company from a potential bankruptcy, Muvico Theaters sold four theatres to Cinemark: Arundel Mills Egyptian 24 in Hanover, Maryland; Paradise 24 in Pembroke Pines, Florida; Palace 20 in Boca Raton, Florida; and Boynton Beach 14 in Boynton Beach, Florida. Muvico was bought by another theater chain (Carmike Cinemas) in 2013, which was bought by yet another (AMC Theatres) in 2016.

=== Rave Cinemas purchase ===
In November 2012, Cinemark announced it was acquiring Rave Cinemas, the Dallas, Texas–based chain that operates the former Bridge theater with IMAX in Culver City, California, for US$240 million. The deal included 32 theaters located in 12 US states, representing 483 screens. Tim Warner, Cinemark's CEO said in a statement "The acquisition of these high quality assets will further enhance Cinemark's diversified domestic footprint, including the expansion of our presence in the New England market". The sale was closed on May 29, 2013, but Cinemark was required to sell the Rave Stonybrook 20 + IMAX theater in Louisville, Kentucky, the Rave Ritz Center 16 in southern New Jersey, and either the Rave Hickory Creek 16 in Hickory Creek, Texas or the Cinemark 14 in Denton, Texas. In addition, Cinemark's chairman Lee Roy Mitchell was also required to sell the Movie Tavern Inc. to Southern Theatres. On July 18, 2013, Cinemark found a buyer, Carmike Cinemas, for the Stonybrook 20 & IMAX, Rave Ritz Center 16, and the Rave Hickory Creek 16. With this change, National CineMedia has been replaced with Screenvision at the Stonybrook 20 and Ritz Center 16. Screenvision is already at Hickory Creek, Texas at the time of the announcement of the sale. The sale was closed on August 16, 2013. On September 12, 2013, Southern Theatres announced that they acquired The Movie Tavern from Lee Roy Mitchell after he was required to sell The Movie Tavern after Cinemark bought Rave Cinemas on May 29, 2013. In 2018, Southern sold the Movie Tavern chain to the Marcus Corporation. As part of Southern Theatres' long-term deal with National CineMedia, The Movie Tavern switched from Screenvision to National CineMedia in June 2014. Also, Cinemark purchased Rave Cinemas Baldwin Hills Crenshaw 15, in Los Angeles, in June 2014.

== Cinemark Loyalty Program ==
The Cinemark Loyalty Program, first introduced in March 2016, is a tiered loyalty program that offers different monthly rewards. This membership program requires members to be 16 years or older to join, and is accepted at any Cinemark branded theater including Century, CineArts, Tinseltown, and Rave Theaters. The first tier is Movie Fan, a free rewards level that allows members to earn points per every dollar purchased, earn birthday rewards, access to advanced tickets, extra savings, etc. In the next tier, Movie Club, members pay $10.99 per month and have all of the perks associated with the Movie Fan level. Additional perks include one free ticket per month, deals on concessions and purchases, and member-priced tickets. Since the release of the loyalty program in December of 2017 to Jan. 2026, this movie theater subscription program has 1.45 million members in addition to the Movie Rewards free loyalty program with member rewards.

== Premium formats and amenities ==
- Cinemark XD (formerly standing for Extreme Digital Cinema and also known simply as XD): Cinemark's premium large format. Featuring state-of-the-art large screens, 11.1 layers of surround sound (most often Auro 11.1 or Auro 3D) and 4K laser projection by Barco with 2D and 3D capatability. The format received THX certification in May 2018. XD is in over 300 auditoriums across the U.S. and Latin America, representing 13% of global box office in 2025 on 5% of screens.
- IMAX: Some Cinemark theatres feature IMAX auditoriums, with a select few equipped with IMAX 70mm technology.
- D-BOX: A haptic motion system that syncs with the film's actions. Seat availability is limited to 2-3 rows and also available at XD or ScreenX auditoriums. D-BOX motion seats are installed in more than 630 auditoriums in Cinemark theaters.
- ScreenX: A movie theater that presents films with two additional screens on walls for a 270-degree view.
- RealD 3D: Some auditoriums (including XD or ScreenX) are available using RealD glasses.
- Luxury Lounger Recliners: Approximately 72 percent of the domestic circuit reclined.
- Online Movie Merchandise: shop.cinemark.com
- Movie Concession Home Delivery: Offers national delivery partnerships with Uber Eats, DoorDash, Grubhub, and 7NOW, allowing guests to order select Cinemark concessions for at-home enjoyment.

== See also ==
- AMC Theatres
- Cinepolis
- Regal Cinemas
