= Hilltop Mall =

Shopping mall in Richmond, California

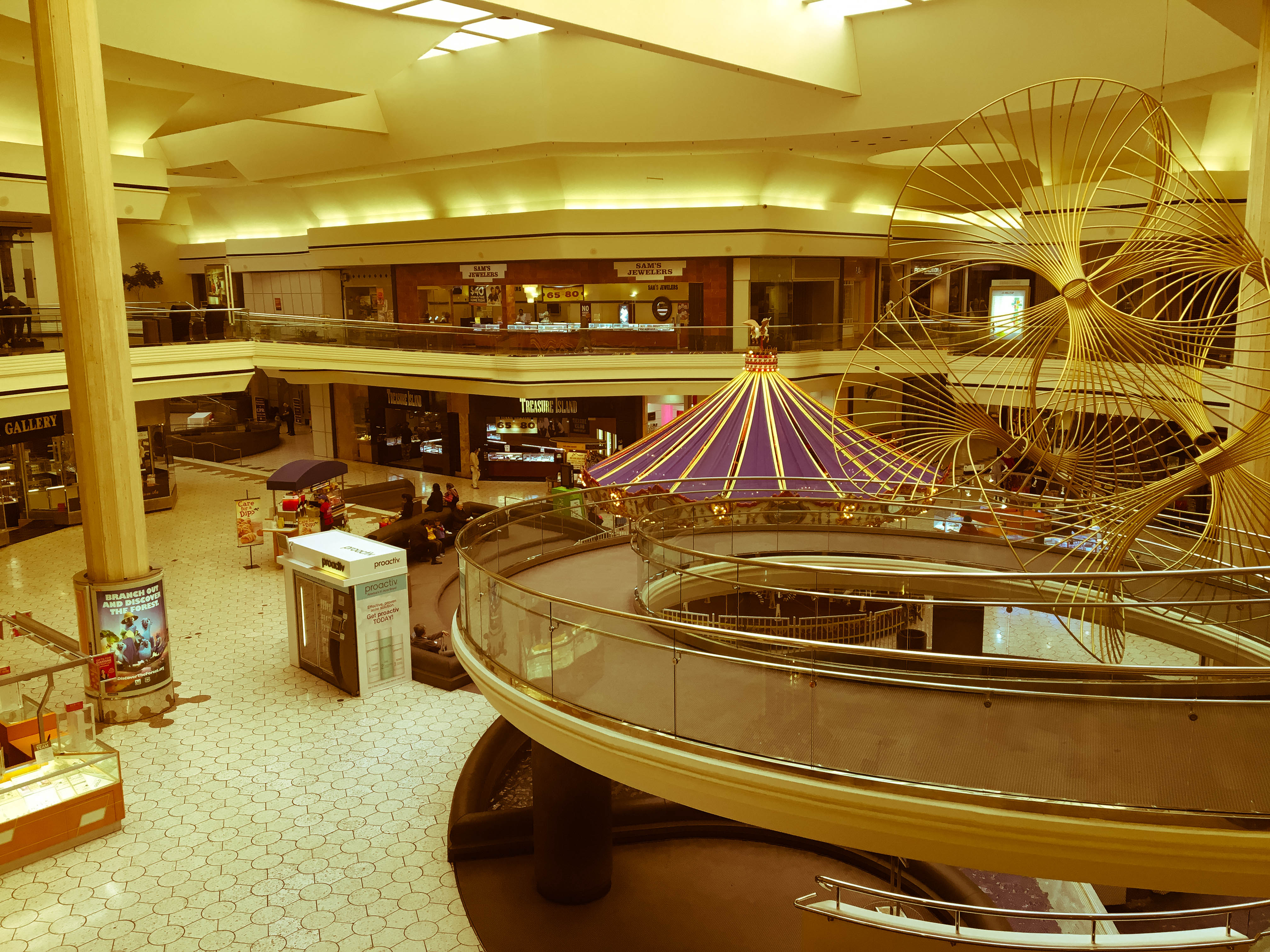
- Hilltop Mall Rotunda in 2017, with carousel, spiral ramp, and Solar Cantata (1971) by Charles O. Perry over the fountain.
- Location: Richmond, California, United States
- Coordinates: 37.980725°N 122.32826°W
- Opened: September 2, 1976; 50 years ago
- Closed: April 22, 2021; 5 years ago
- Developer: Taubman Centers
- Manager: Prologis
- Owner: Prologis
- Num. of stores: 150
- Num. of anchor tenants: 5 (1 open, 4 vacant by May 2026)
- Floor area: 1,100,000 sq ft (100,000 m^{2})
- Floors: 2
- Public transit: AC Transit 72, (74), 76, LA; WestCAT (19), JR/JL
- Website: Hilltop District Website

Hilltop Mall is a defunct mall in Hilltop, Richmond, California. Hilltop was developed by Taubman Centers, and most recently managed and co-owned by Prologis, Inc. The only anchor store remaining is Walmart, with three vacant anchor stores that were once home to Macy's, JCPenney and Sears.

== History ==
According to former Richmond City Councilmember Nat Bates, the earliest proposal to develop a new shopping center in Richmond would have built it in downtown Richmond, along the northern side of Macdonald between 10th and 14th streets, stretching to Nevin; the Taubman Company proposed an alternate site on Tank Farm Hill in North Richmond, so named because it previously was occupied by an oil storage tank farm owned by the Chevron Corporation. Black community leaders overwhelmingly preferred the downtown site and it was assumed the three Black councilmembers would vote to support the downtown proposal. Taubman spoke privately to Bates, letting him know they would withdraw the Hilltop proposal unless they received at least one of the three votes, adding they would then build the shopping mall in a neighboring city. Bates, fearful of losing the sales tax revenue, made a motion and voted to support the Hilltop site.

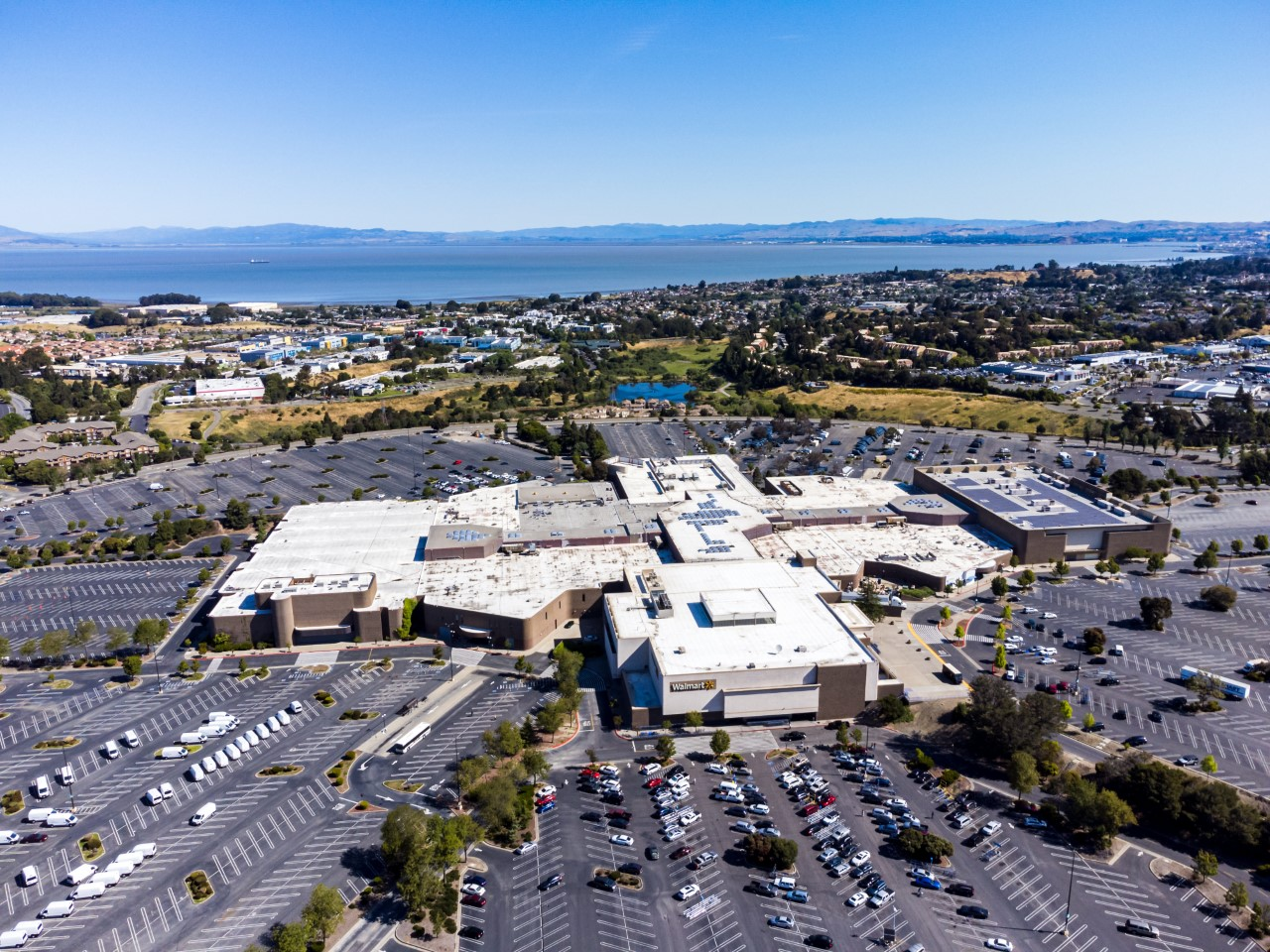
Aerial view of Hilltop Mall, directed north towards San Pablo Bay

Hilltop Mall opened in September 1976. The mall was developed by A. Alfred Taubman, who also developed several other shopping malls in the East and South Bay Area, including Eastridge Center in San Jose, Stoneridge Shopping Center in Pleasanton, and Sunvalley Mall in Concord. Originally, it was anchored by red-tiled Capwell's, JCPenney and Macy's. Both Macy's and JCPenney originally had stores in downtown Richmond, but while Macy's had closed its downtown store a couple of years earlier, JCPenney kept its downtown store open for a year after Hilltop opened. Capwell's changed its name to Emporium-Capwell in 1979, before becoming simply The Emporium in 1990. Sears was added in 1990 in a newly built north wing addition, which was an expansion of this property.

Once opened, the mall attracted the major anchor stores from Richmond's downtown, with several major national chain stores closing downtown locations, although many acknowledge that the trend predated Hilltop due to economic and safety issues.

The Hilltop Mall Cinemas, operated by Plitt Theatres, opened in the mall on August 25, 1976, showing first-run films on a four-screen multiplex; four more screens were added upstairs in 1988 after being taken over by Cineplex Odeon. The Hilltop 8 closed in the mid-1990s after shifting to a second-run, discount film model, and the space is now part of the 24 Hour Fitness. The Century 16 Hilltop was opened in 2001, in the Hilltop Plaza power center east of the mall.

=== 1996: Emporium closes ===
The mall remained largely unchanged until 1996, when the Emporium store closed following its merger with Federated, who owned Macy's. The store remained vacant until October 1998, when Macy's refurbished and relocated their existing store into the former Emporium space and closed the original Macy's store. The former Macy's space would remain vacant until Walmart took over the space in Spring 2007.

=== 1998: Sale to GM Pension Trust ===
The GM Pension Trust assumed full ownership of Hilltop Mall in 1998, retaining Taubman Centers as manager. In 2004, the GM Pension Trust sold a half-interest in a portfolio of shopping centers, including Hilltop, to the Mills Corporation, which also assumed management of the center. After several years of delay, Walmart opened on April 11, 2007 on the site Macy's vacated in 1998.

=== 2007: Sale to Simon Property Group ===
In April 2007, Simon Property Group and Farallon Capital purchased the entire Mills Corporation portfolio, including other Bay Area properties: Stoneridge Shopping Center in Pleasanton, California and Great Mall in Milpitas, California. On December 23, 2011, a shopping frenzy over retro Air Jordan shoes resulted in temporary closure of the mall after shots were fired. The mall later reopened, but sales of the shoe were banned for the day. Similar events occurred at the nearby Westfield Solano and the Bayfair Center malls in Fairfield and San Leandro, respectively.

=== 2012: Loan default ===
In August 2012, Greg Maloney, president of Jones Lang LaSalle (JLL) Retail, was appointed receiver by the Contra Costa Superior Court to assume management of the property due to Simon's loan default. JLL retained Michael Piazzola as its managing receiver. The property was foreclosed upon in June 2013, and Jones Lang LaSalle was retained as the manager post-foreclosure.

=== 2017: JCPenney closes and failed revitalization ===
On March 17, 2017, it was announced that JCPenney would be closing as part of a plan to close 138 stores nationwide. The store closed on July 31, 2017.

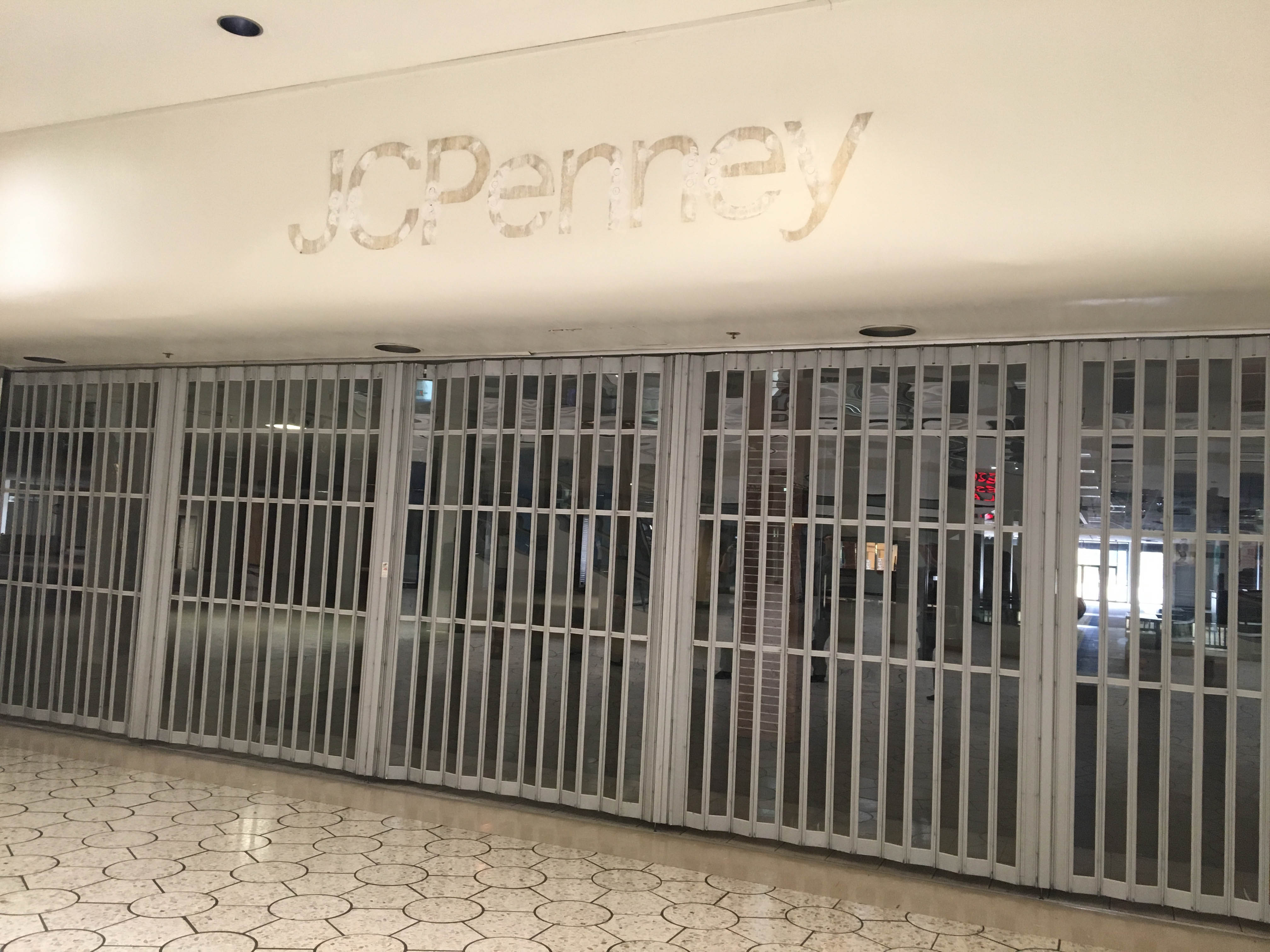
Closed JCPenney mall entrance (Oct 2017)

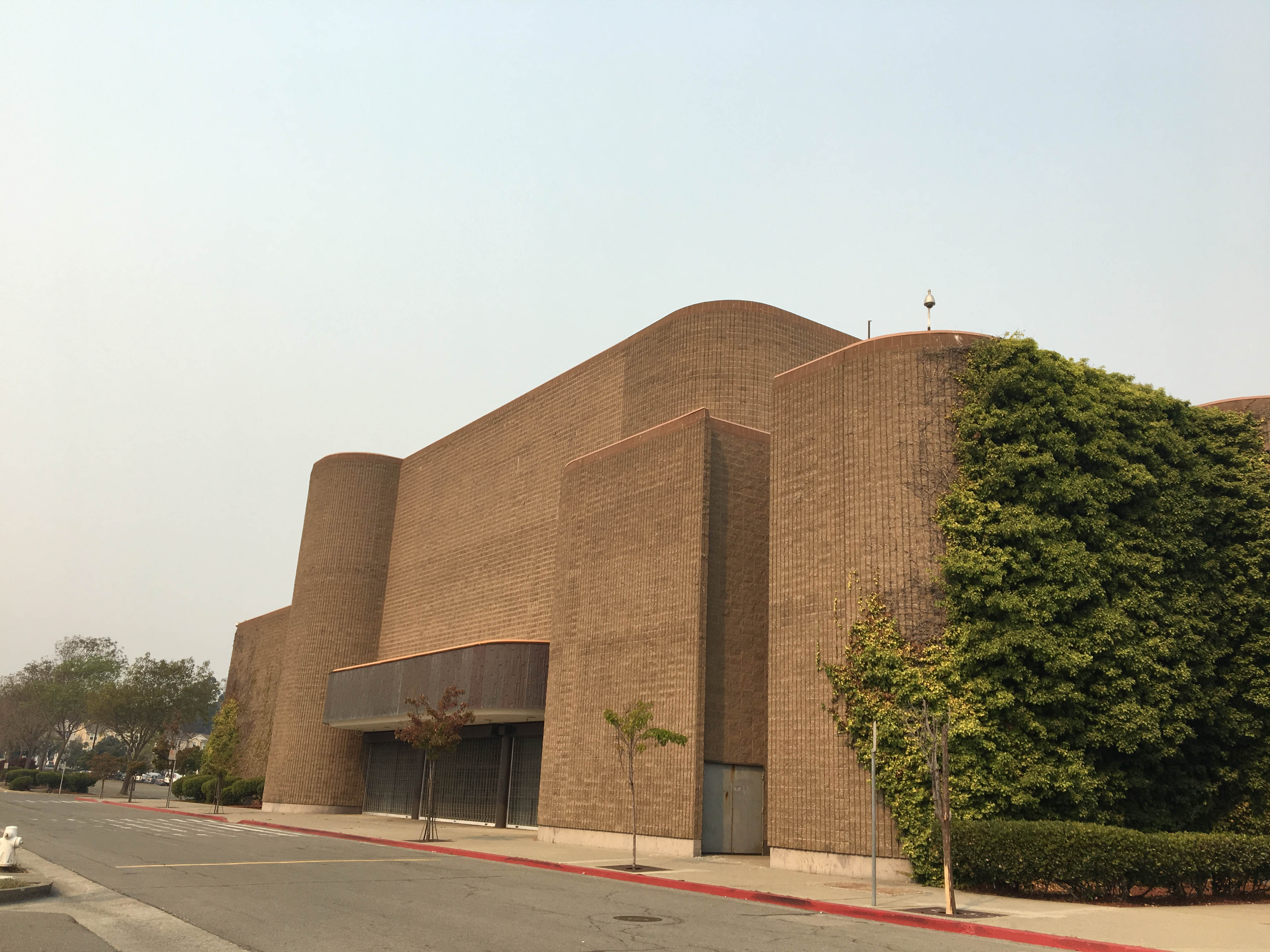
Exterior of former JCPenney anchor (Oct 2017)

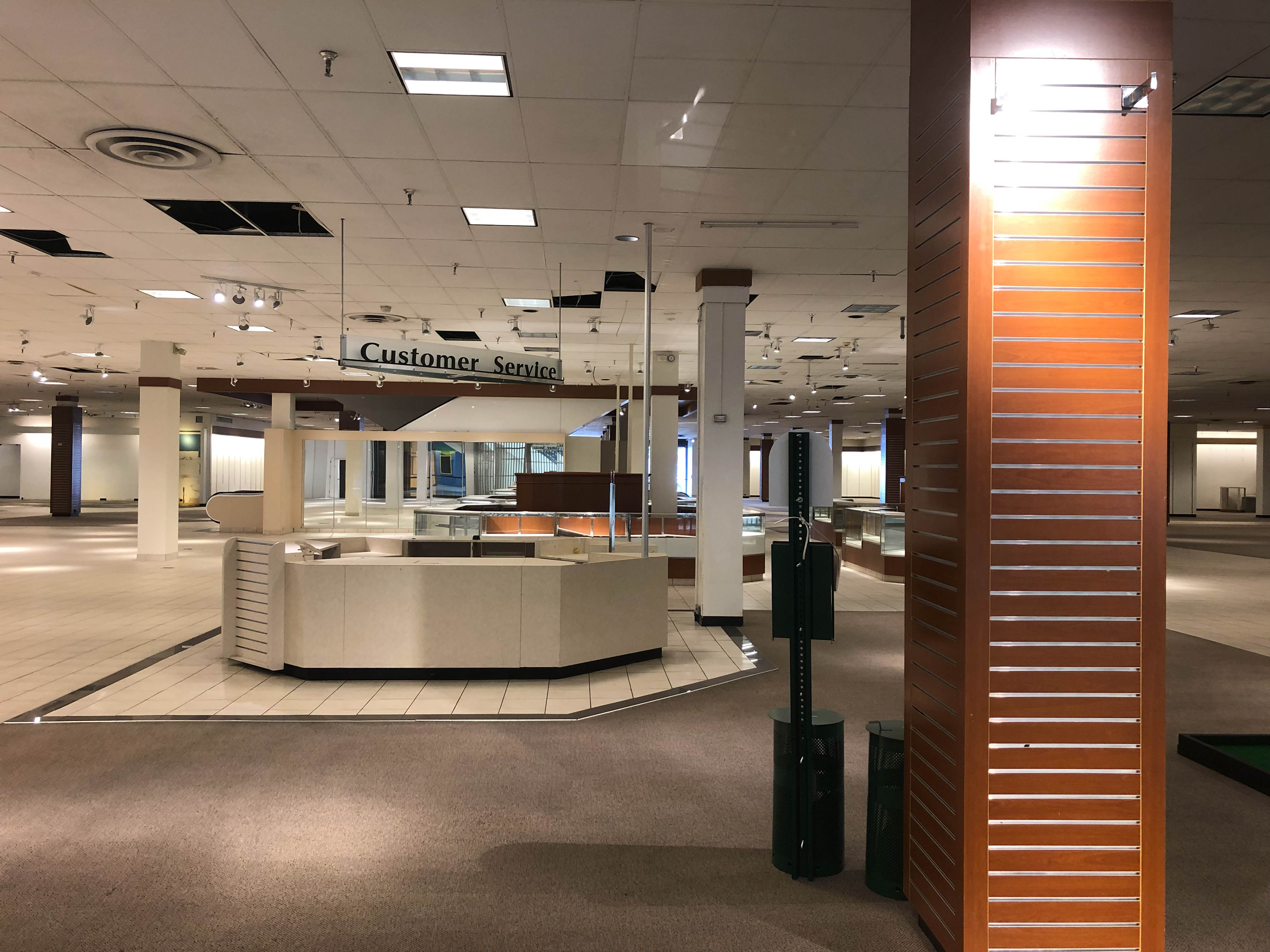
Interior of former JCPenney anchor (2019)

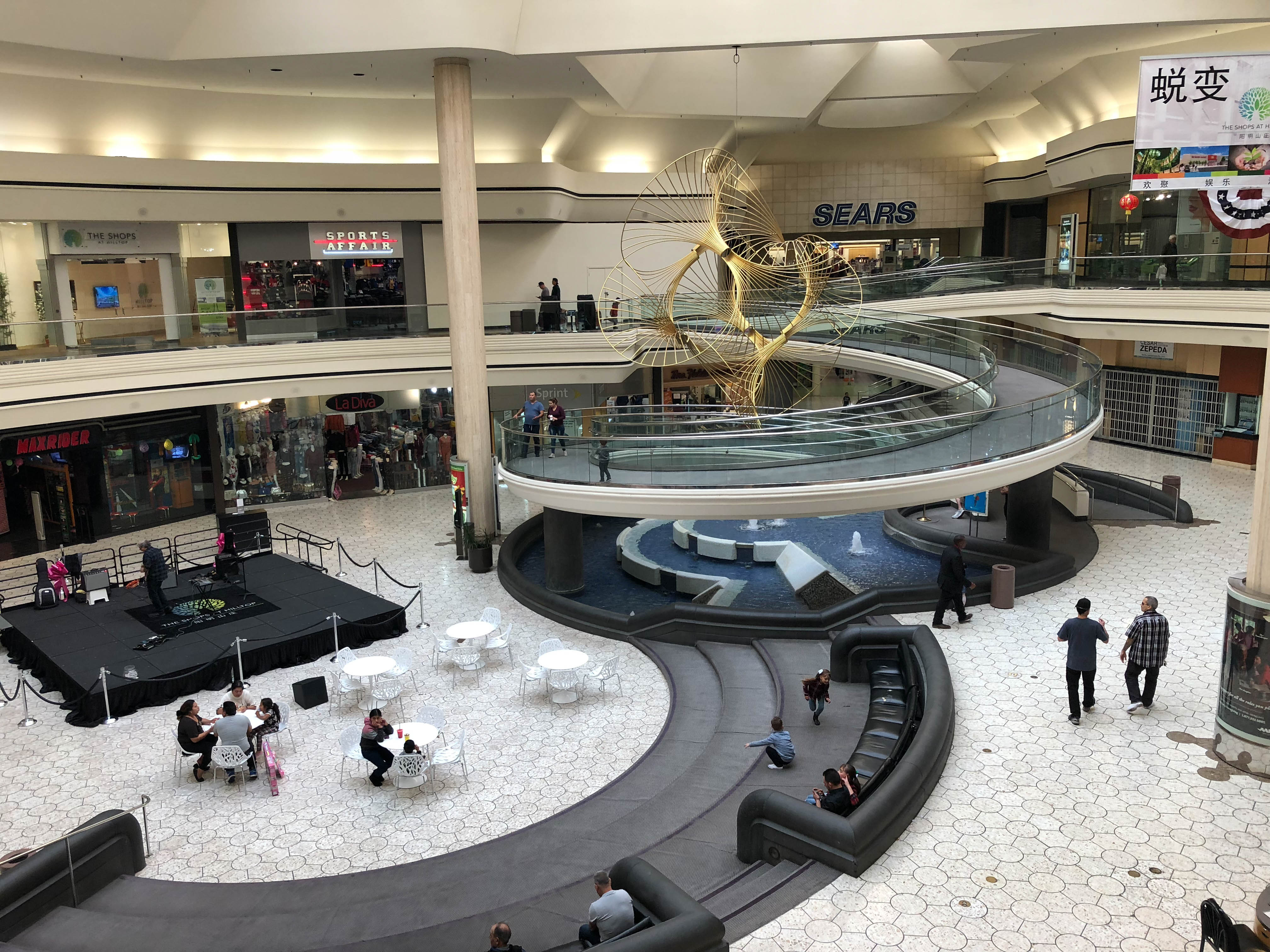
Rotunda (2018), with spiral ramp, fountain, and Solar Cantata

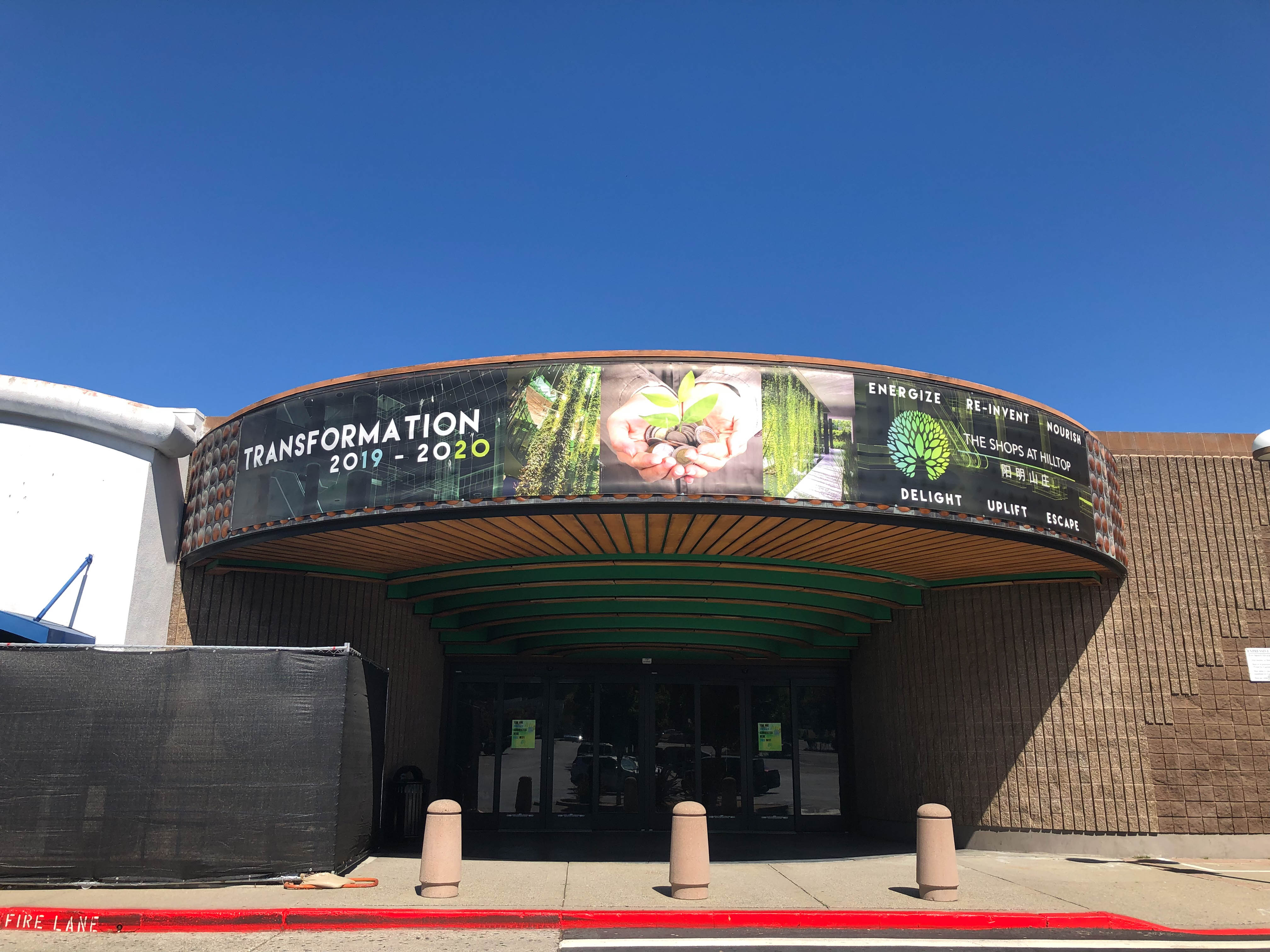
Pending name change to The Shops at Hilltop (2019)

Also in July 2017, LBG Real Estate Companies, LLC and Aviva Investors announced the purchase of the Hilltop Mall property. The property went into foreclosure by Simon Property Group in 2012 and then proceeded to be put up for auction before it was bought by LBG and Aviva. LBG had begun the process of rebranding, redeveloping and upgrading both the interior and exterior of the mall structural buildings. Working with urban planners, LBG developed a strategy to transform the property during 2020 and beyond.

In September 2017, the shopping center rebranded as The Shops at Hilltop, representing a new vision to modernize the property. The renovated shopping center, as designed by Onyx Creative, would have contained new dining, entertainment, office, and retail tenants. After redevelopment, The Shops at Hilltop would have hosted 99 Ranch Market as a new anchor tenant and a variety of dining options representing many different cuisines. There were also plans for personal care services and several entertainment options including a live theater as well as a mix of creative office tenants to the center connecting the shopping, dining, and cultural experiences to the workplace.

In addition to the Shops, LBG had created a master plan for the long-term, mixed-use redevelopment of the fully entitled 77-acre site which would have complemented the existing shopping center. This larger mixed-use development, named Hilltop by the Bay, referred to all the development occurring on the old Hilltop Mall Property. Hilltop by the Bay would have had more than 3,500 housing units, as well as office, hotel, and entertainment uses.

Beyond the existing building, the Hilltop by the Bay development would have built up the area to create a suburban village on the Hilltop property. The site was entitled for 16.7 million square feet of overall building area, including up to 9,670 housing units. This would have allowed for expansion and development with a variety of uses including a Marriott Residence Inn. The mixed-use offered by the Hilltop by the Bay development would have enabled a "work, live, play" environment for those who utilized the full breadth of retail spaces that were intended to be offered once the development was completed.

LBG stated in July 2018 the 99 Ranch Market was scheduled to open in late 2019, but the project was never completed. LBG failed to improve the site as promised and the COVID-19 pandemic in the San Francisco Bay Area caused retail occupancy to plummet from 50% to 16%. LBG subsequently announced plans to rename the location as "The East Bay Science and Technology Center". 99 Ranch decided to withdraw from the project and other planned tenants followed suit.

=== 2020: Sears closes ===
On February 6, 2020, it was announced that Sears would be closing as part of a plan to close dozens of stores nationwide. The store closed in April 2020. The mall closed almost all stores during the COVID-19 pandemic starting in mid-March 2020, with the exception of Walmart.

Hilltop Mall

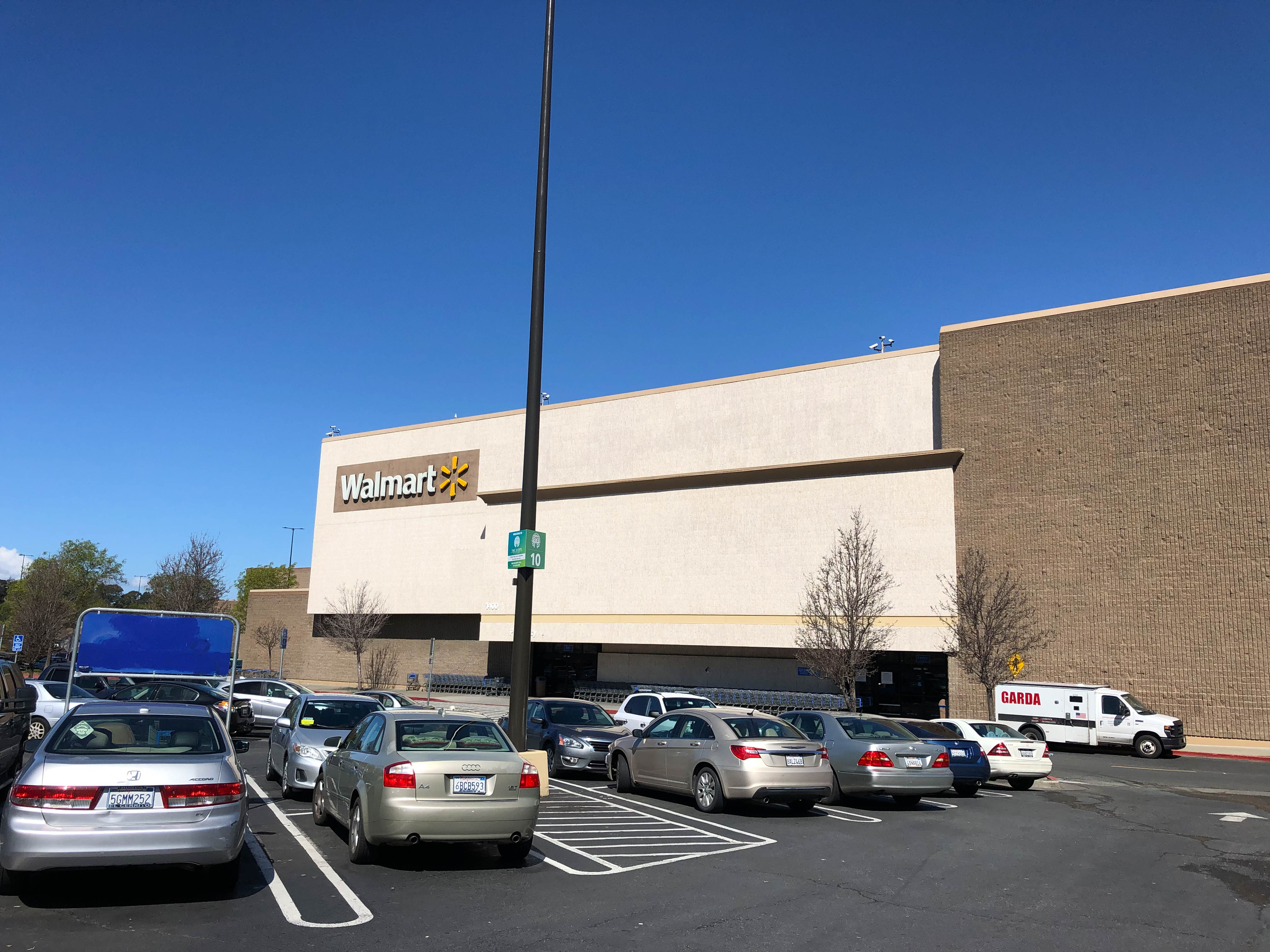
Walmart

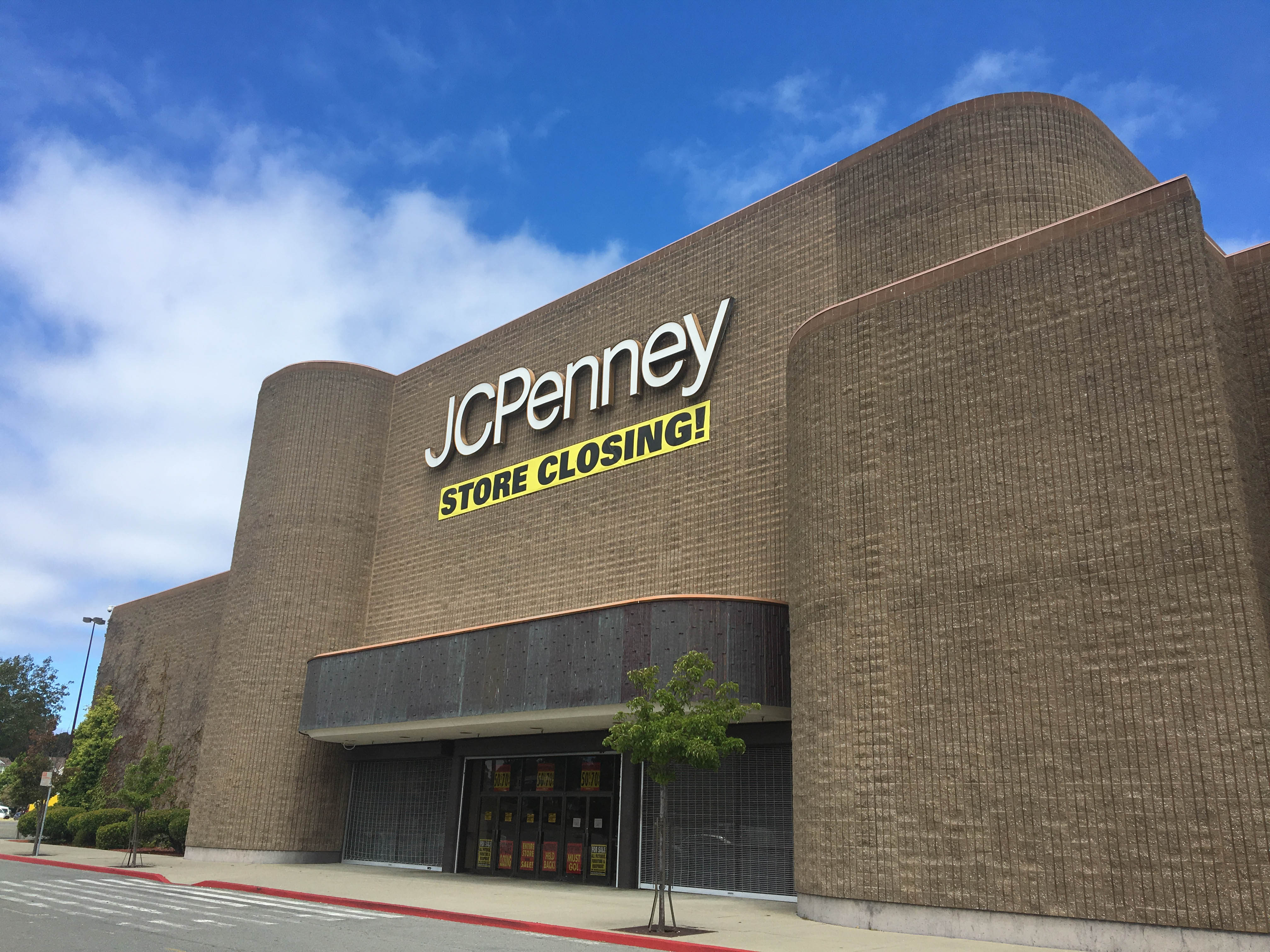
JCPenney

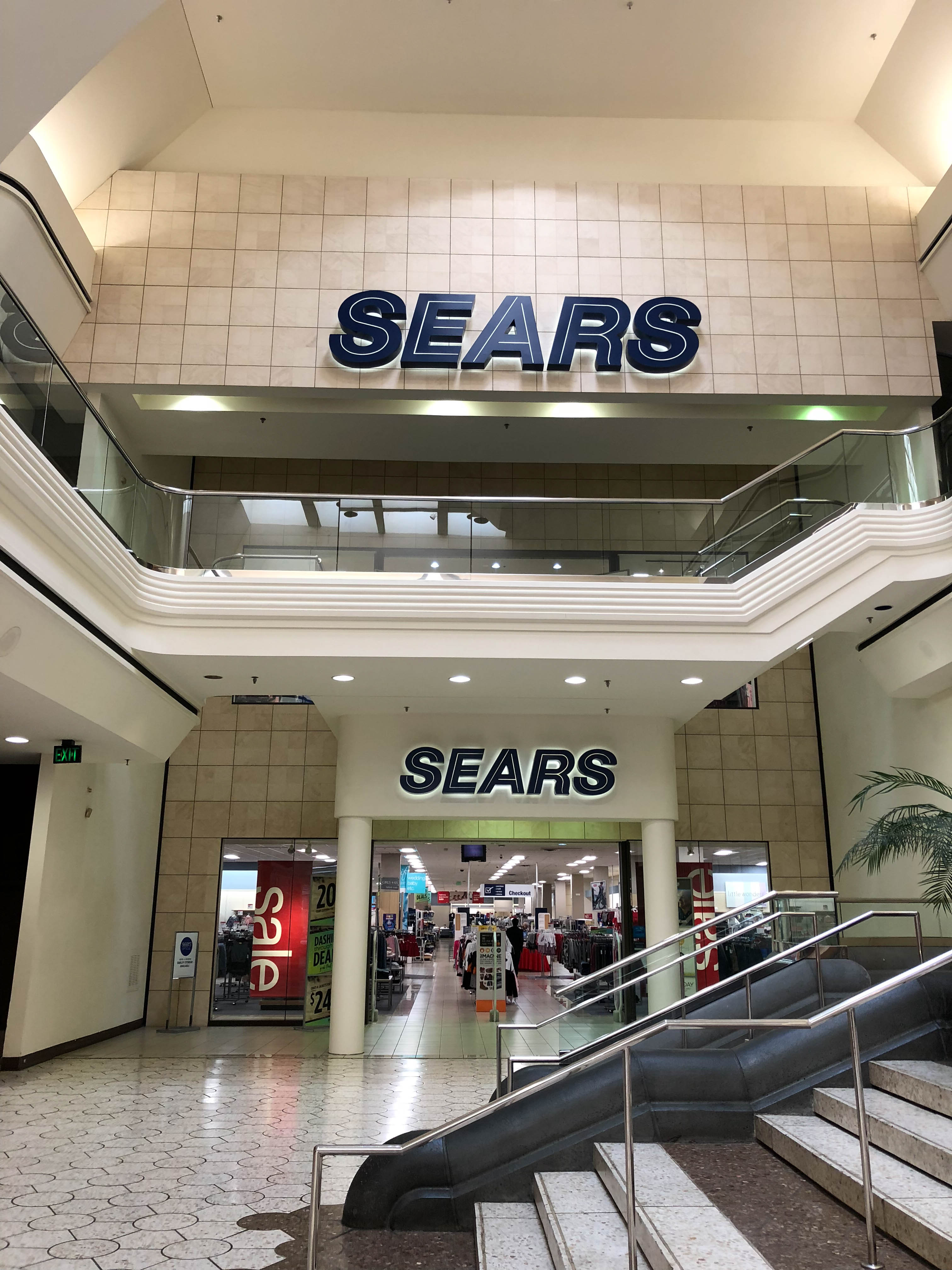
Interior entrance to Sears

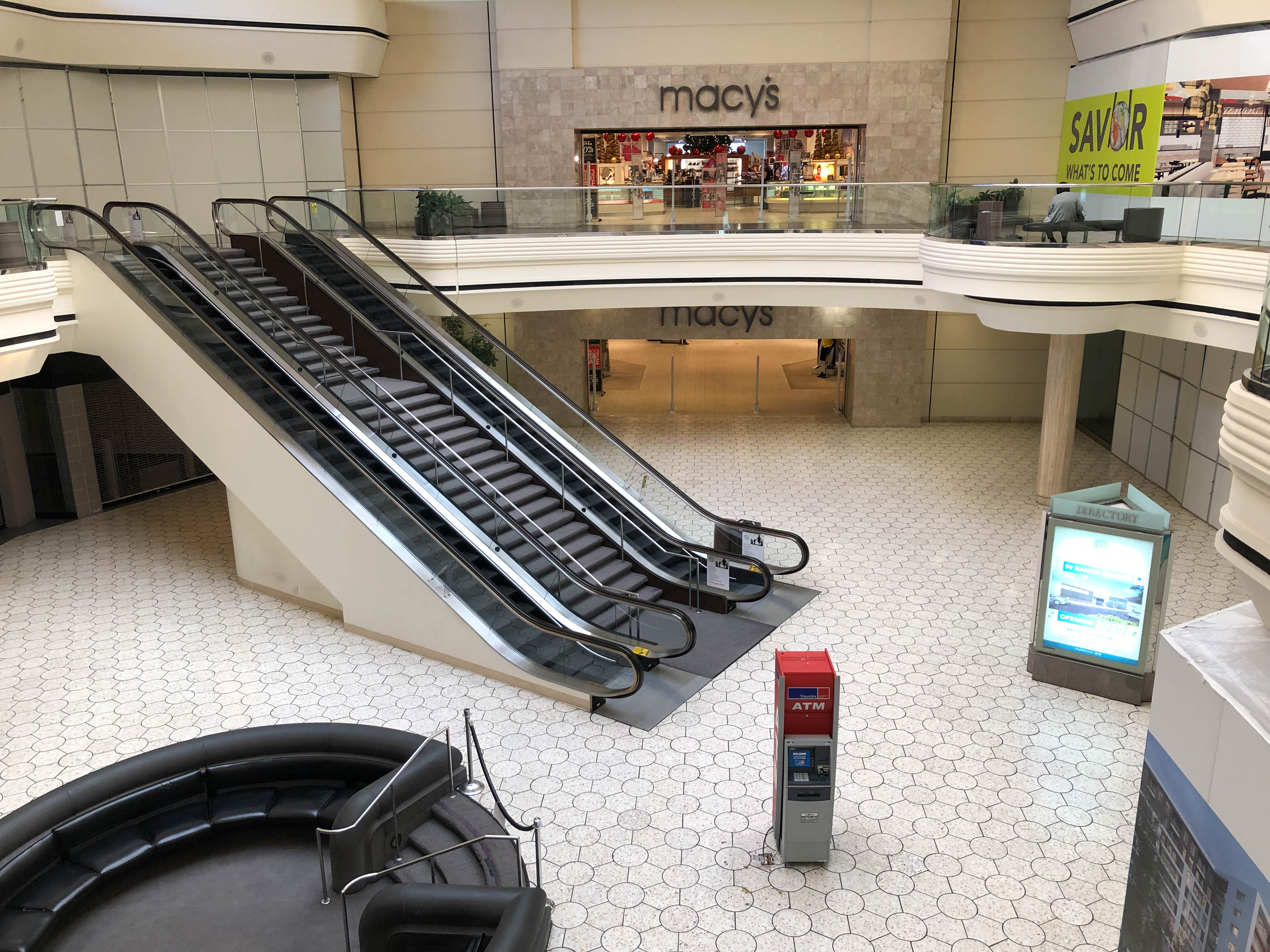
Interior entrance to Macy's

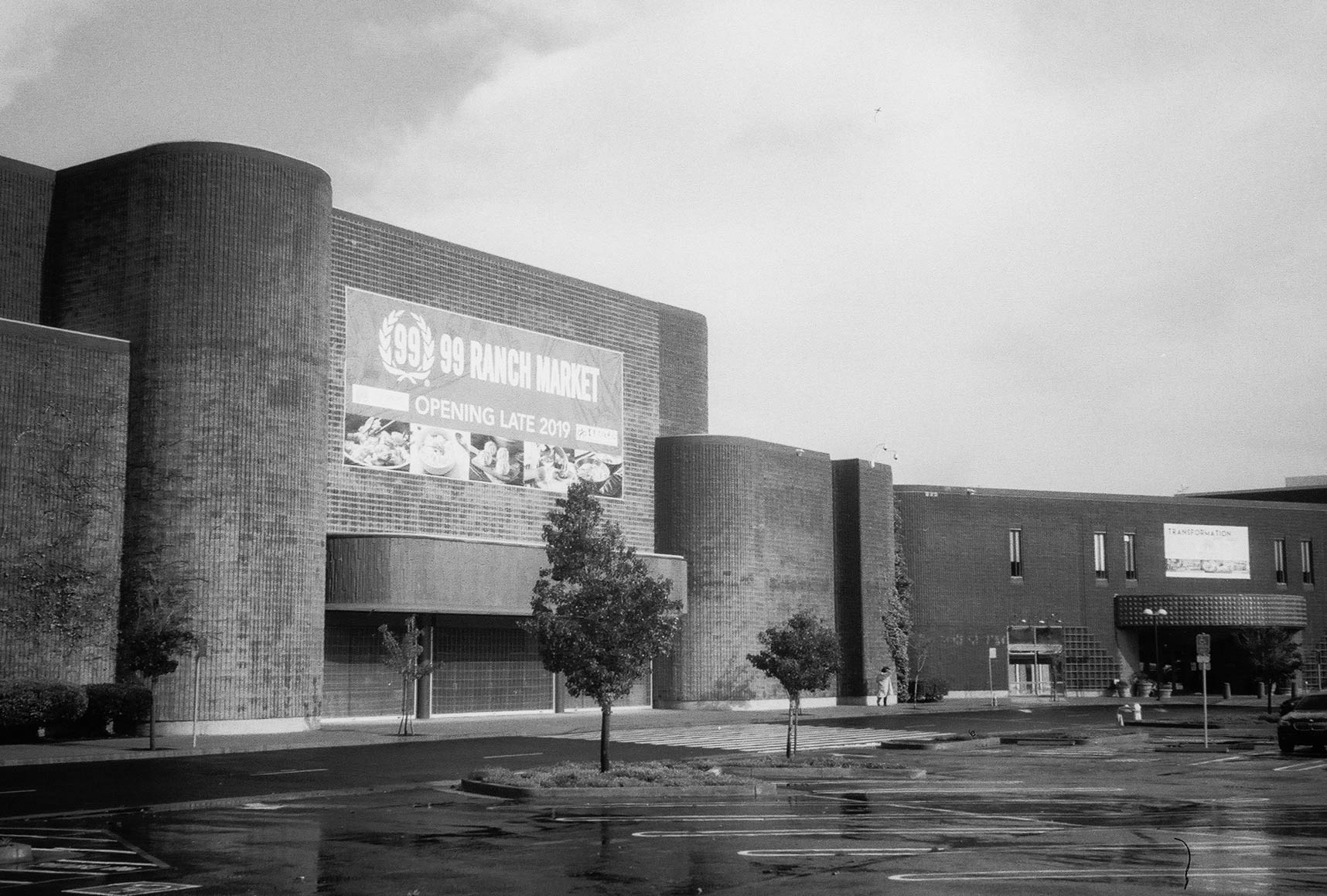
99 Ranch Market intended to open in 2019 in the former JCPenney space

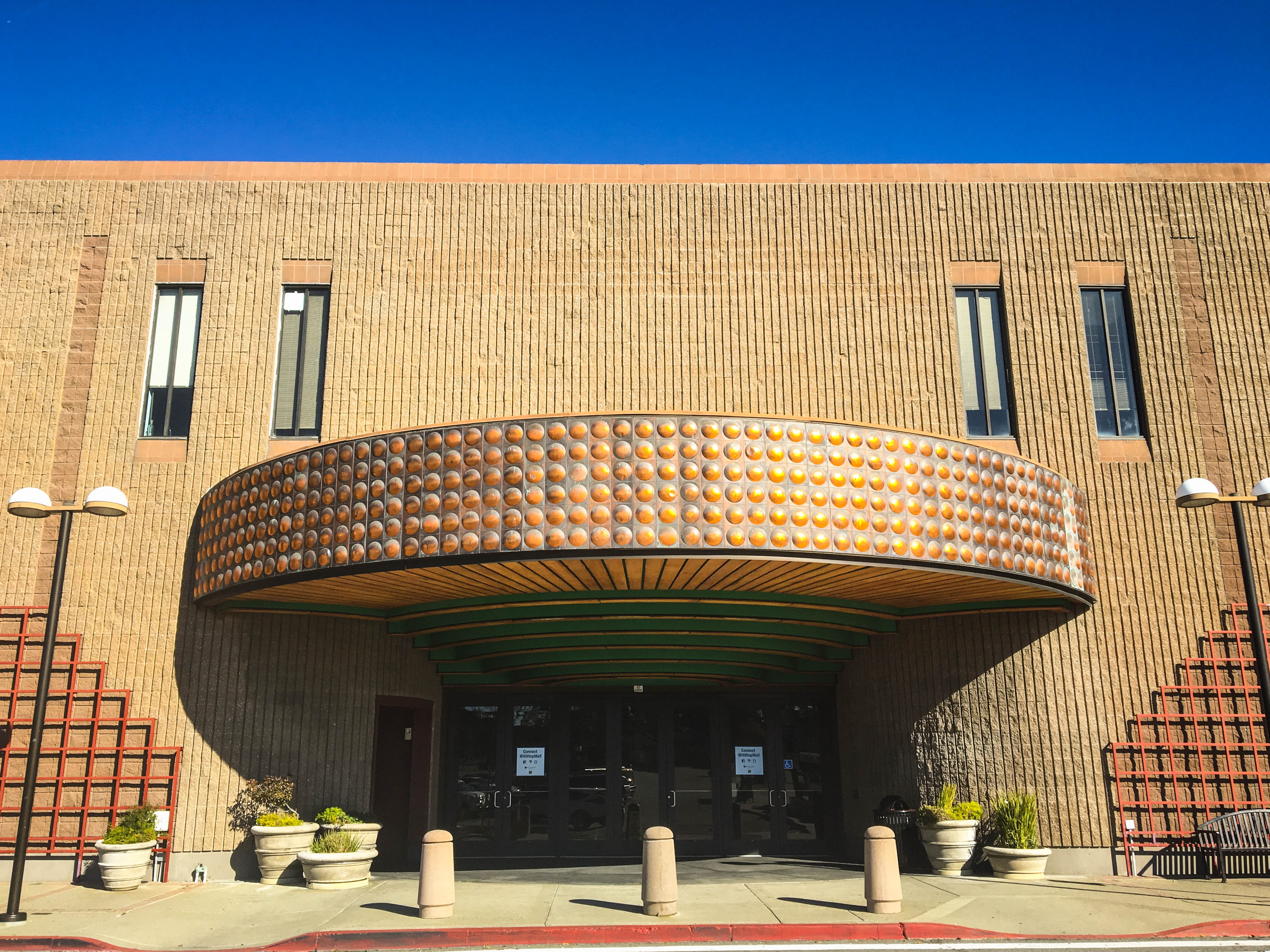
Direct entrance to mall interior, not passing through an anchor store

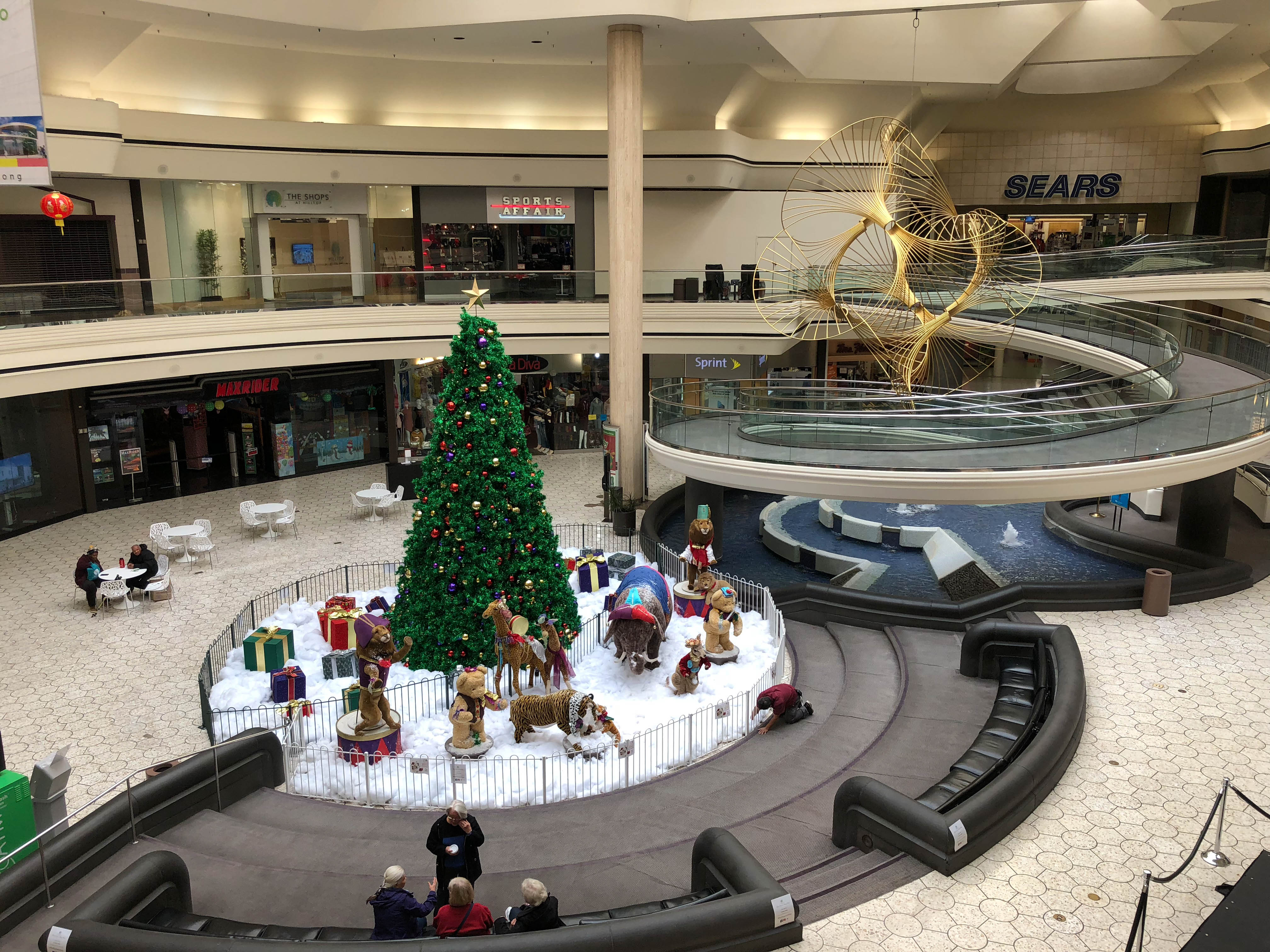
Holiday display in Hilltop Mall Rotunda

=== 2021: Sale to Prologis ===
On January 5, 2021, it was announced the Macy's at Hilltop would be closing in April 2021 as part of a plan to close 46 stores nationwide. After Macy's closed in March 2021, Walmart became the only traditional anchor store left.

In February 2021, Richmond mayor Tom Butt announced that logistics company Prologis was buying most of the land with the intention to build a logistics center along with other developments, including housing. In April 2021, Prologis completed the acquisition of the site for $117 million; they announced plans to demolish the mall and reuse the site: "The purchase of the 78-acre site marks the beginning of Prologis' efforts to pursue a mixed-use development that includes residential and retail as well as the modern logistics facilities that are the company's specialty." The mall was closed permanently on April 22, 2021.

As of 2023, Richmond City Council is deciding on the future of the site as part of the Hilltop Horizon Specific Plan.

== Design ==
Hilltop Mall was laid out with two intersecting hallways aligned with the cardinal directions and four anchor store sites at each point, similar to Eastridge Mall in San Jose, which also was developed by Taubman; in its final configuration, the longer (east-west) axis ran between JCPenney on the west end and Macy's (formerly Capwell's/The Emporium) on the east, while the shorter (north-south) axis ran between Sears on the north end and Walmart (formerly Macy's) on the south. The mall building is surrounded by an oval perimeter road and parking lots between the building and perimeter road.

At the center of the mall, where the north-south and east-west hallways intersect, the Rotunda included a carousel, seating, and fountain on the ground level, and a spiral ramp surrounding the fountain rose to the second level. Solar Cantata, a sculpture created by Charles O. Perry in 1971 using gold-anodized aluminum, is installed above the fountain and can be viewed from the spiral ramp. The Rotunda also was used for holiday events.

== Notes and references ==
Oakland Tribune (Richmond-area edition), Sept. 3, 1976, page 13
