= Rave Cinemas =

American movie theater chain

Rave Cinemas, LLC
- Rave Cinemas' Valley Bend 18 in Huntsville, Alabama
- Company type: Private
- Industry: Entertainment—Theaters
- Founded: 1999; 27 years ago, in Dallas, Texas, U.S.
- Founder: Thomas W. Stevenson, Jr.
- Headquarters: Plano, Texas, US
- Key people: Rolando B. Rodriguez (president & CEO); Peter A. Nelson (executive vice president & COO); Arthur Starrs III (executive vice president & CFO)
- Parent: Cinemark Theatres (2013–present)

Rave Cinemas, LLC, formerly known as Rave Motion Pictures, is a movie theater brand founded in 1999 and owned by Cinemark Theatres. It previously was headed by Thomas W. Stephenson, Jr., former CEO of Hollywood Theaters, and Rolando B. Rodriguez, former Vice President and Regional General Manager for Walmart in Illinois and northern Indiana. The chain was headquartered in Dallas, Texas until it was acquired by Plano-based Cinemark Theatres.

== Company history ==
Rave Cinemas, LLC was formed in late 2009 by TowerBrook Capital Partners and investors Lambert Media Group and Charles B Moss, Jr. Rave Cinemas then acquired four properties, corporate infrastructure, and leadership, and the Rave Motion Pictures brand from Boston Ventures owned Rave Reviews Cinemas, LLC (RRC).

RRC continues to own 21 other properties which will operate under the "Rave Motion Pictures" branding under a management services agreement with Rave Cinemas, LLC. Concurrently with the RRC acquisition, Rave Cinemas, LLC, purchased the business operations and real estate of 35 properties owned by National Amusements, Inc. (NAI), parent company of Viacom and CBS Corporation. The former NAI assets were rebranded "Rave Motion Pictures" in the second quarter of 2010.

In October 2012, Rave Reviews Cinemas, LLC, signed an agreement to sell 16 theaters with 251 screens to Carmike Cinemas for $19 million in cash and $100.4 million of assumed lease obligations. Of the 16 theaters being acquired, six are in Alabama, four in Florida, two in Indiana, and one each in Illinois, Pennsylvania, Tennessee, and Texas. Before the sale Rave owned or managed 62 theaters and 939 screens located in 21 states across the country.

In November 2012, Cinemark entered into an agreement to purchase 32 Rave Cinemas locations for $240 million. The sale is subject to antitrust approval. Only two locations were to remain under the Rave Cinemas umbrella after the Cinemark sale was completed, however there was much speculation within the industry that these remaining two locations will either be sold or shuttered.

On November 27, 2012, AMC Theatres entered into an agreement to purchase four Rave Review Cinemas, LLC theaters not purchased by Carmike Cinemas, Cinemark, or Starplex. Of the four theaters being acquired, two were in Louisiana, and one each in Alabama and Florida.

On January 4, 2013, AMC Theatres entered into another agreement to purchase six more Rave Cinemas theaters not purchased by Carmike Cinemas, Cinemark or Starplex. Of the six theaters being acquired, two were in Ohio, one in North Carolina, one in Nevada, one in Nebraska and one in California.

On May 10, 2013, Starplex Cinemas bought the Berlin 12 located in Kensington, CT from Rave Cinemas.

On May 29, 2013, the sale of Rave Cinemas to Cinemark Theatres was completed. Cinemark was also required to sell the Rave Stonybrook 20 + IMAX theater in Louisville, Kentucky, the Rave Ritz Center 16 in southern New Jersey, and either the Rave Hickory Creek 16 in Hickory Creek, Texas or the Cinemark 14 in Denton, Texas due to the purchase of Rave Cinemas. In addition, Cinemark's chairman Lee Roy Mitchell was also required to sell the Movie Tavern Inc. to Southern Theatres. Some former Rave locations now have the Cinemark branding.

On July 18, 2013, Carmike Cinemas announced that they will be buying the Stonybrook 20 & IMAX, Ritz Center 16 and the Hickory Creek 16 theaters from Rave Cinemas, a division of Cinemark. Cinemark kept the Cinemark 14 in Denton, Texas. With this change, Hickory Creek will remain with Screenvision. Louisville KY and Voorhees NJ will switch to Screenvision from National CineMedia. Because Cinemark retained the Denton location, it remained with National CineMedia. The sale was closed on August 16, 2013.

On September 12, 2013, Southern Theatres announced that they acquired the Movie Tavern from Lee Roy Mitchell after he was required to sell the Movie Tavern after Cinemark bought Rave Cinemas on May 29, 2013. As a result, Cinemark opened their own dinner-and-a-movie theatres called Movie Bistro. This concept was launched in August 2013 and is currently at four Cinemark locations in Colorado, Louisiana, and Texas. The Movie Tavern will remain a brand of Southern Theatres. As part of Southern Theatres' long-term deal with National CineMedia, the Movie Tavern switched from Screenvision to National CineMedia in June 2014. As of December 2016, AMC now owns those former Carmike theatres, some of which are now AMC branded.

The company also owned "Rave Digital Media" along with Continental Retail Development, with headquarters in Columbus, Ohio, and operated six properties under the "Rave Digital Media" brand. The Rave Digital Media brand was sold to AMC Theatres on January 4, 2013.

== Amenities and features ==
Most theaters features multiple concession stands, arcade games, online and kiosk ticketing, and a futuristic environment with special lighting, LCD menu and film trailer displays, and some have a stylized special event room.

Every auditorium in Rave built theaters features the following:

- DLP Cinema Projection
- DTS digital surround sound
- Stadium seating
- Reclining seat backs
- Oversized luxury reclining seats
- Retractable arm rests / cup holders / tray tables
- 18 inch rise to each row (to promote clear line-of-sight)
- 48 inches of excess space between each row (to add additional leg room)

In addition, large auditoriums often feature two-floor exits with central seating for patrons with physical disabilities and elevator access. Several of the theaters are also equipped with Real D 3D theater systems. Each newly opened building is completely digital in picture and sound.

Properties acquired from National Amusements may not have all of the features or designs listed above.

== Rave and Christie Digital ==
In June 2006, Rave Motion Pictures announced a partnership with Christie/AIX to install 445 digital theater systems in its theaters. Several Rave theaters (including theaters in Peoria, Illinois and Huntsville, Alabama) already have Christie systems installed; a full conversion of existing theaters was completed in August 2007.

When Rave Cinemas acquired some theaters from National Amusements in late 2009 and early 2010, they used Barco projectors instead of Christie. With Rave Cinemas now owned by Cinemark, the Christie projectors will be removed and replaced with Barco projectors. At AMC Theatres, the Christie projectors (Barco projectors at Grove City 14) were removed and replaced by Sony 4K Digital Cinema except for the largest screens. At Carmike in Hickory Creek, Texas, the Christie projectors will be kept. At Carmike in Louisville, Kentucky and Voorhees, New Jersey, the Barco projectors will be removed and replaced with Christie.
