= PragerU =

American conservative non-profit media organization

- Formation: 2009; 17 years ago
- Founders: Dennis Prager; Allen Estrin
- Type: 501(c)(3) nonprofit organization
- Tax ID no.: 27-1763901
- Region served: United States, United Kingdom
- CEO: Marissa Streit
- Revenue: US$56 million (2021)
- Expenses: US$32.9 million (2021)
- Staff: 97 (2021)
- Website: www.prageru.com

The Prager University Foundation, known as PragerU, is an American 501(c)(3) nonprofit advocacy group and media organization that creates content promoting conservative and pro-capitalist viewpoints on various political, economic, and sociological topics. It was co-founded in 2009 by screenwriter Allen Estrin and talk show host Dennis Prager. Despite the name including the word "university", it is not an academic institution and does not confer degrees.

PragerU's videos have contained misleading or factually incorrect information on slavery and racism in the United States, immigration, and the history of fascism. PragerU has been further accused of promoting racism, sexism and anti-LGBT politics.

PragerU is used as supplemental education material in public schools in eight states: Florida, Texas, Oklahoma, Montana, Louisiana, New Hampshire, Arizona, and South Carolina.

== History ==
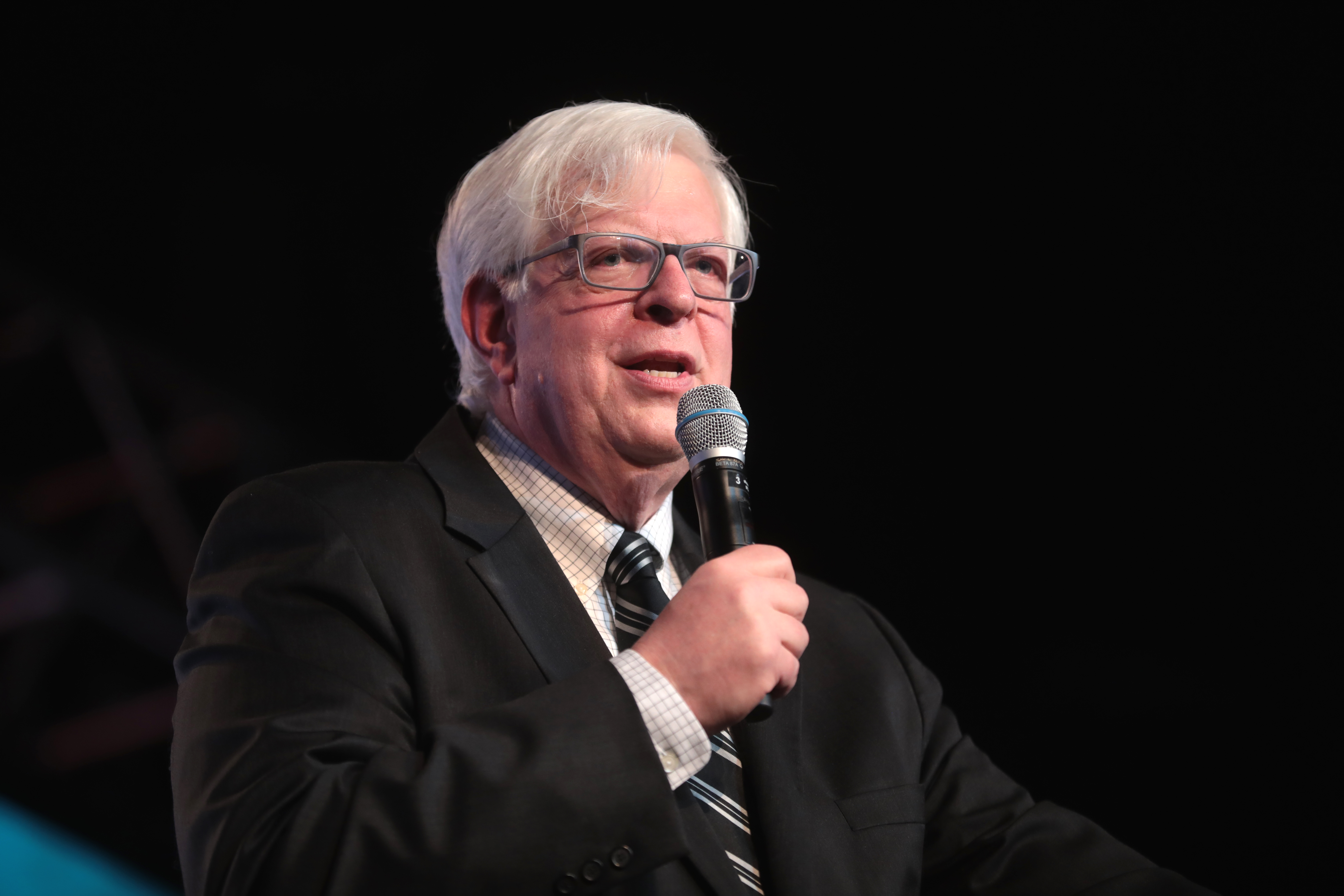
Dennis Prager, co-founder of PragerU, in 2018

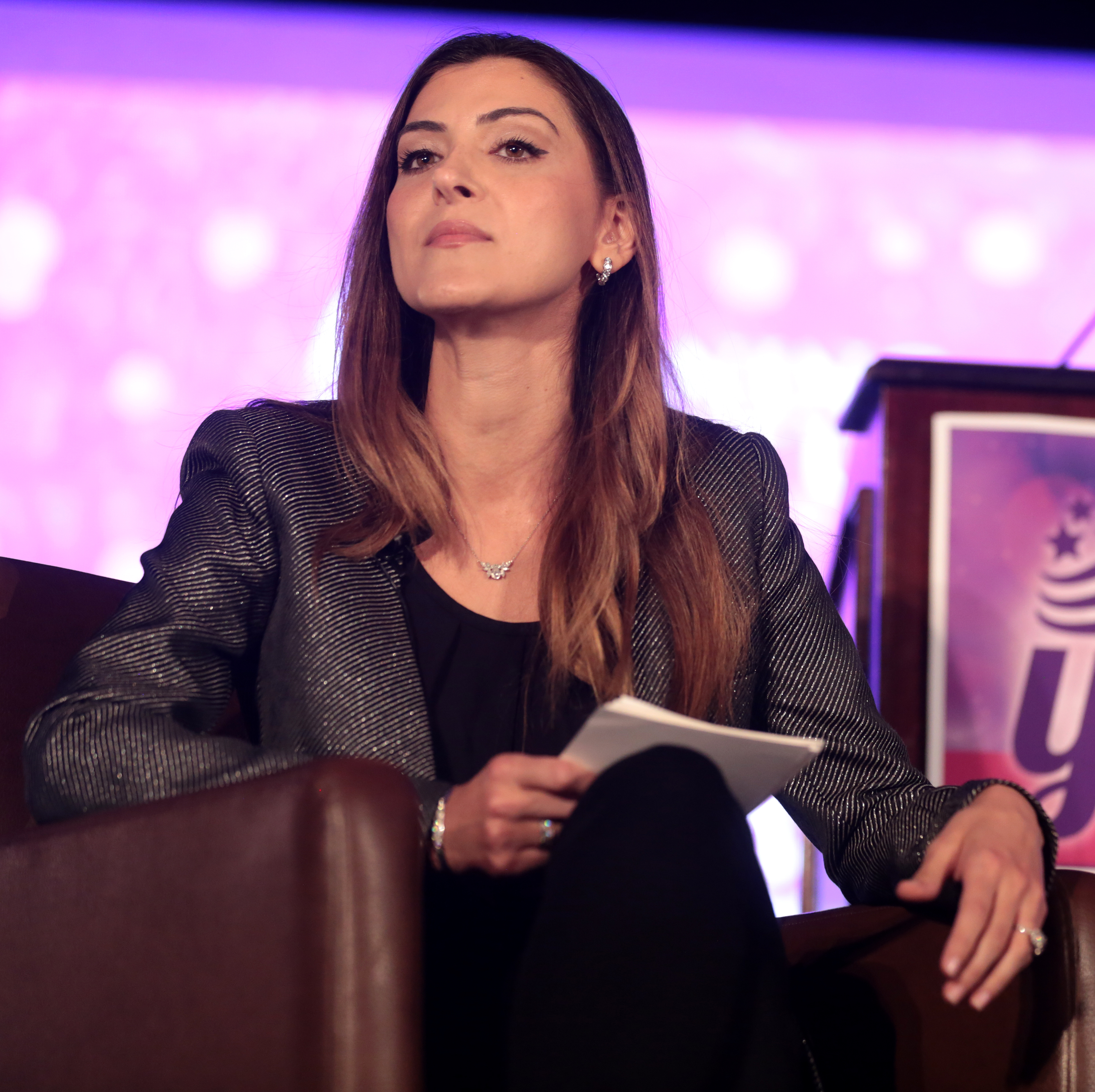
Marissa Streit, CEO, in 2018

PragerU was founded in 2009 by conservative radio talk show host Dennis Prager and radio producer/screenwriter Allen Estrin, in order to advocate for conservative views and to offset what Prager regards as the undermining of college education by the left. Marissa Streit, a former Israeli army intelligence member and headmistress of a Los Angeles county school, joined in 2009, and was made the chief executive officer in 2011. They originally considered making it a brick-and-mortar university, but the idea was revised into a digital product to save money.

PragerU is based in the San Fernando Valley of Los Angeles, California, and it had around 50 employees as of January 2020. PragerU encourages students to join "PragerFORCE", an international student organization to promote PragerU's videos and ideology; about 6,500 college and high school students promoted its videos as of 2020. Despite the name, PragerU is not an academic institution and does not hold classes, does not grant certifications or diplomas, and is not accredited by any recognized body.

PragerU reached a billion views in 2018.

In July 2019, PragerU representative Allen Estrin attended then-United States President Donald Trump's Social Media Summit, along with other conservative organizations and people such as Charlie Kirk and James O'Keefe.

=== Conflicts with YouTube and Facebook ===
In October 2016, PragerU claimed that YouTube had put 21 of PragerU's videos in the "restricted mode" setting, which ensures content is age appropriate. YouTube responded, saying: "We aim to apply the same standards to everyone and we don't censor anyone. Often it's not the right approach to say that videos with the same topic should get the same rating. We'll need to take into consideration what the intent of the video is, what the focus of the video is, what the surrounding metadata of the video explains."

In October 2017, PragerU filed a federal lawsuit against YouTube's parent company, Google, claiming that 37 of its videos were unfairly demonetized or flagged so that they could only be viewed with "restricted mode filtering," which limits views based on viewer characteristics such as age. PragerU claimed that Google's demonetization and flagging violated the First Amendment by arguing that YouTube was a public forum. In March 2018, U.S. District Judge Lucy Koh dismissed the case, ruling that because Google was a private company, PragerU had failed to show that Google had infringed its free speech rights. In February 2020, the U.S. 9th Circuit Court of Appeals upheld this ruling.

In 2018, as part of its efforts to counter misinformation, YouTube added fact-checking tags to PragerU's videos about climate change. In August 2018, Facebook removed two PragerU videos from its platform. It later restored the videos, saying that they "were mistakenly removed." According to Francesca Tripodi, professor of sociology at UNC-Chapel Hill, there are plausible non-ideological explanations for Facebook's removal of several of the videos. PragerU contended that Facebook had engaged in deliberate censorship.

In 2020, YouTube took down two trans-critical videos featuring Candace Owens for violating its policy on hate speech, wherein gender dysphoria was likened to schizophrenia and disease.

== Finances ==
The organization depends on donations to produce its content. Much of PragerU's early funding came from fracking billionaires Dan and Farris Wilks. Two members of the Wilks family sit on PragerU's board. The next-largest donor is the Lynde and Harry Bradley Foundation. Other donors include the Morgan Family Foundation, Fidelity Charitable Gift Fund, Donors Trust, the late Republican megadonor Sheldon Adelson, Lee Roy Mitchell, and the Minnesota-based Sid and Carol Verdoorn Foundation, led by former C.H. Robinson CEO Sid Verdoorn. Major support is also provided by the National Christian Foundation and the Dick and Betsy DeVos Family Foundation.

As of 2018, the organization reportedly had a $10 million annual budget, of which it spent more than 40% on marketing. In 2019, 40% of its budget came from almost 130,000 online donors; the Los Angeles Times noted that PragerU attracted more donors than some Democratic presidential primary contenders had at the time. In 2021, PragerU reported to have received about $57 million in revenue, most of it from donations, and reported approximately $33 million in expenses. PragerU consistently spends more on Facebook advertising than major political campaigns and national advocacy groups. In 2019, it ranked among the 10 biggest political spenders on the platform.

In 2020, PragerU received $704,057 in COVID-19 relief loans from the Paycheck Protection Program; this debt was later forgiven in full.

== Content ==
PragerU releases videos on various topics from a conservative viewpoint that according to its site "advances Judeo-Christian values." As of February 2023, its YouTube channel included 2,200 videos. Each video costs between $25,000 and $30,000 to create. Dennis Prager "personally approves every item" and "edits every script" before publication, according to Mother Jones. PragerU guests cover a range from the secular right, the far-right, and the theocratic right. Some prominent video presenters have included Ben Shapiro, Candace Owens, Tucker Carlson, Nigel Farage, Charles Krauthammer, Michelle Malkin, Bret Stephens and George Will.

Much of PragerU's popularity comes from its "5-Minute Videos", which summarize economic, political, and cultural topics, with many discussing controversial topics.

Among topics covered, PragerU videos have argued against a $15 minimum wage, against increased gun control and in support of capitalism. Although topical, PragerU videos largely avoided mentioning Donald Trump during his first presidency. PragerU is pro-Israel, and Dennis Prager has said that "Nothing better identifies incipient evil than antisemitism." PragerU videos also promote the Electoral College, arguing that it thwarts voter fraud and that "pure democracies do not work".

Dave Rubin stated in a video that "racism, bigotry, xenophobia, homophobia, and Islamophobia" are "meaningless buzzwords". In a video about the alt-right, Michael Knowles argued that it has nothing in common with conservatism and instead is close to leftism, except the left is much larger.

Historians and political scientists have criticized PragerU's videos for containing misleading claims about topics such as slavery and racism in the United States, immigration, and the history of fascism. According to GLAAD, an LGBT media monitoring organization, PragerU also promotes anti-LGBT politics.

=== Climate change denial and propaganda ===
PragerU promotes fossil fuels while criticizing the use of renewable energy and disputing the scientific consensus on climate change. According to the non-profit think tank InfluenceMap, targeted ads posted on Facebook included misleading material that cast doubt on science, framed climate concerns as ideological and hysteria, and promoted a conspiracy theory that "big government control" is the real motivation behind energy policies to reduce gas emissions.

PragerU has made claims that renewable energy is harmful to the environment. It has promoted "new climate denial", which involves casting doubt on the negative effects of climate change and anti-climate change policies. Climate Feedback, Reuters and the Weather Channel have found that their videos promote inaccurate and misleading claims about climate change.

=== Gender-affirming care ===
In November 2023, PragerU released Detrans: The Dangers of Gender-Affirming Care, a 21-minute film that follows two people who began gender-affirming care in their late teens and then later detransitioned. The short film was launched with a $1 million marketing campaign that included a "timeline takeover" on Twitter. Detrans was condemned by the president of the Human Rights Campaign, an American LGBTQ advocacy group, who called it "hate-filled propaganda".

=== School program ===
By 2015, PragerU developed two partnership programs to promote its views, including religious material, in public and private schools. PragerU's Educator Program, with 3,000 sign-ups reported as of 2015, supplies teachers with lesson plans and study guides that accompany videos. Secondary school teachers and college professors can register their classes through PragerU's Academic Partnership program, which lets students sign up and allows teachers to monitor their students' progress.

In 2023, Florida became the first state to accept PragerU as an official education vendor. They were approved by the Florida Department of Education, who said that PragerU "aligned with the state's revised civics and government standards." The decision allows public school teachers in Florida to incorporate PragerU videos into their classroom materials. Critics warned that the official recognition of PragerU will expose students to the program's extreme material and expressed concerns about allowing an organization with a track record of disinformation into the curriculum. Florida's move was followed by New Hampshire, Oklahoma, Montana, and Arizona, with Louisiana becoming in May 2024 the sixth state to give PragerU materials state sanction.

In July 2025, Oklahoma announced that it had partnered with PragerU to develop an ideology test to screen and withhold teaching certificates from teachers from "woke" states.

=== Founders Museum ===
On June 25, 2025, PragerU launched a "Founders Museum" exhibit at the White House for the 250th anniversary of the Declaration of Independence in partnership with the Department of Education. The exhibit featured AI-generated videos of people from the Revolutionary War.

== Reception ==
According to a 2019 report in the Los Angeles Times, PragerU videos have been watched more than 2 billion times. In its 2022 annual report, PragerU stated that its videos have received over 7 billion lifetime views. PragerU has ranked highly in influence compared to other free-market advocacy organizations, such as Reason and National Review. Vanity Fair said PragerU "packages right-wing social concepts into slick videos" and that PragerU was "one of the most effective conversion tools for young conservatives."

Sociologist Francesca Tripodi has studied PragerU's marketing and messaging for the nonprofit Data & Society. She found that PragerU relies on search engine optimization and "suggested content" to market its videos. She noted that PragerU was popular among the respondents in her study and that they all either liked or shared PragerU videos on Facebook. Tripodi argued that PragerU allows viewers to dabble in content that "makes connections to" the alt-right's talking points. In this way, viewers identifying as mainline conservatives gain "easy access to white supremacist logic." She also demonstrated an algorithmic connection on YouTube between PragerU, Fox News, and alt-right personalities.

A BuzzFeed News article published in 2018 attributed PragerU's success to the quality of its production values compared to similar outlets and to its use of popular presenters with established audiences. The article also noted that it had received comparatively little attention from news and media analysts due to PragerU's lack of coverage of topical issues, such as Donald Trump.

An August 2019 article by Drew Anderson in GLAAD noted PragerU's "interviews with many controversial public figures who are often hailed by the white supremacist movement" and accused it of a "horrific anti-LGBTQ record." Reason criticized PragerU's claims of being censored by big tech companies as being false, given that content had not been removed from any social media platforms and that they indicate a misunderstanding of the First Amendment as protecting a party from any type of censorship, when that law merely protects content from censorship by the government.

PragerU's coverage of COVID-19 has been proven to have spread false and misleading information about the nature of the pandemic and potentially life saving remedies.

In 2019 to counteract PragerU, the former United States Senator for Alaska Mike Gravel launched The Gravel Institute, a progressive think tank.

Mother Jones said PragerU videos assert that there is no gender pay gap, and that there is not discrimination in policing of African-Americans. On the subject of race, Pam Nilan says in her 2021 book Young People and the Far Right that PragerU "pretends to sidestep" white supremacy, but that "the message is always that white culture is better than other cultures."

A case study of PragerU by McCarthy & Brewer said that "PragerU has fundamental overlapping ideologies to the extreme right" and detailed the methods of persuasion PragerU uses which "combine in a way that reflects information laundering and persuasion techniques used on online platforms by white supremacists who similarly hide racist propaganda behind more politically correct wording and professional-looking websites."

=== Criticism of videos ===
According to Joseph McCarthy of the Weather Channel, in the 2016 video "Fossil Fuels: The Greenest Energy", fossil fuel proponent Alex Epstein promotes misinformation about climate change, including false and misleading claims. The paleoconservative scholar Paul Gottfried, who has written on fascism, criticized a PragerU video hosted by Dinesh D'Souza which stated that fascism was a left-wing ideology. D'Souza maintained that Italian philosopher Giovanni Gentile, who influenced Italian fascism, was a left-winger, to which Gottfried noted that this contradicted the research by almost all scholars of Gentile's work who view him as an intellectual of the revolutionary right.

According to Francesca Tripodi, PragerU's videos advance the conspiracy theory, popular among the alt-right, that whiteness and conservatism are under attack and many videos on PragerU focus on delegitimizing the mainstream media, accusing it of being based on emotion or opinion rather than fact.

Alex Nowrasteh of the Cato Institute criticized a 2018 PragerU video by Michelle Malkin that argued for stricter restrictions on immigration. Nowrasteh wrote that the video was full of errors and half-truths and omitted relevant information.

In 2018, in the PragerU video "The Suicide of Europe", Douglas Murray argued that Europe is "committing suicide" by allowing mass immigration, condemned "The mass movement of peoples into Europe…from the Middle East, North Africa and East Asia" and criticized European multiculturalism. The Southern Poverty Law Center (SPLC) described the video as a "dog whistle to the extreme right." Mark Pitcavage of the Anti-Defamation League described it as "filled with anti-immigration and anti-Muslim rhetoric". "Why Did the Democratic South Become Republican?" is another video that the SPLC says contains such dog whistles. In this video, Vanderbilt University professor Carol M. Swain argues that the Republicans' Southern strategy is a "myth" and is not what caused the South to become Republican. History professor Kevin M. Kruse said that the video presented a "distortion" of history, "cherry-picked" its evidence, and was an "exercise in attacking a straw man". In June 2020, Snopes and Logically criticized the video "How to End White Privilege" by Brandon Tatum. Tatum argued that white privilege is a myth by claiming his race did not provide a barrier to his personal success, contrary to statistical data on the subject.
