= Santikos Entertainment =

American movie theater chain

- Type: Private
- Industry: Entertainment (movie theaters)
- Founded: 1911; 115 years ago
- Founder: Louis Santikos
- Headquarters: San Antonio, Texas
- Number of locations: 27 (2023)
- Key people: Blake Hastings (CEO)
- Brands: The Grand Theatre; AmStar Cinemas
- Owner: Santikos Real Estate Services
- Website: santikos.com

Santikos Entertainment (formerly Santikos Theatres) is an American movie theater and entertainment center chain based in San Antonio, Texas.

Santikos Entertainment is a for-profit company that exists for the sole purpose of giving back to non-profits in the San Antonio area in the form of donations, sponsorships, grants, and programming.

== History ==
Santikos Theaters was founded in 1911 by Greek entrepreneur Louis Santikos and was owned and operated by his son, John L. Santikos, until his death in 2014. In 2015, as part of his estate, Santikos Entertainment was donated to the San Antonio Area Foundation.

In 2023, Santikos Theaters purchased Southern Theatres from Veronis Suhler Stevenson. With the acquisition, Santikos became the eighth largest theater chain in North America, with 377 screens in states including North Carolina, South Carolina, Georgia, Alabama, Florida, Mississippi, Louisiana, and Texas.

== Locations ==
Santikos Theaters operates in multiple states. Most locations being located in the San Antonio Metropolitan area. The company currently has 27 locations throughout 8 different states. (12 in Texas).
