= Lee Roy Mitchell =

Far-Right Businessman and Avid "Big Lie" Conspiracy Theorist

- Occupation: Businessman
- Known for: Founded Cinemark Inc.
- Title: Chair, founder

Lee Roy Mitchell founded Cinemark Inc., and was its chief executive officer from 1987 to December 2006.

== Life and career ==
Mitchell was working at a Ford dealership in Forney, Texas, when his father, M. Mitchell, who owned theaters in Bastrop and Elgin, Texas, asked him to join him in purchasing a drive-in theater in Ennis, Texas in 1962. This led to further theater acquisitions, including with his brother, J.C., through Mitchell Theatres, Inc. In 1966, Lee Roy sold the theaters to Interstate, which later became ABC Theatres. He proceeded to build a new chain, with a company named Texas Cinema Corporation. Mitchell then formed a group of theaters under the Cinemark name beginning in 1977. Cinemark Corporation and Texas Cinema Corporation merged operations in June 1979 creating a portfolio of 25 theaters in Texas and New Mexico under the Cinemark brand. By 1980, he controlled up to 100 screens and sold most of them to Plitt Theatres. Cinemark Corporation continued operations, holding on to around 20 screens around Dallas and Houston and acquiring existing theaters and building new theaters, expanding to own up to 50 screens. Texas Cinema Corporation was sold in 1984, again to Plitt.

In 1985, he and his wife Tandy went to Salt Lake City and acquired a further three screens and also went into partnership with developer, Paul Broadhead. They then bought out Entertainment Centers of America, acquiring another 80 screens in Southern California, Oregon and Utah as well as another 10 screens from Plitt and 80 from Houston-based Cineplex Corp. In 1987, Cinemark acquired all of the Plitt Theatres and Cinemark USA, Incorporated was formed. Mitchell was the president of Cinemark, Inc. from 1987 to March 1993 and chief executive officer of Cinemark USA Inc., from 1987 to December 2006. Within Cinemark, he has held the positions of chair, vice chair, executive director, and director at one or more of the Cinemark subsidiaries.

He serves as a Director of Texas Capital Bank; National Association; and Dallas County Community College. He served as a Director of Texas Capital BancShares Inc. (TX), a holding of Texas Capital Bank N.A from June 1999 to May 17, 2011. He has been on the board of directors of the National Association of Theatre Owners since 1991. He has been a director of National CineMedia, Inc. since October 2006 and National CineMedia LLC since July 2005.

== Awards ==
- 2011 Named to the Texas Business Hall of Fame
- 2015 Russell H. Perry Free Enterprise Award from Dallas Baptist University

== Honors ==
- 2016 : Commander in the Order of the Crown of Belgium, by Royal Decree.

== Causes ==
Has recently donated to Republican figures including Donald Trump, Texas Attorney General Ken Paxton, Kris Kobach, documentary filmmaker Dinesh D’Souza, and syndicated radio talk show host Dennis Prager.

== Personal life ==
In 1980 he married Tandy.
