= Stoneridge Shopping Center =

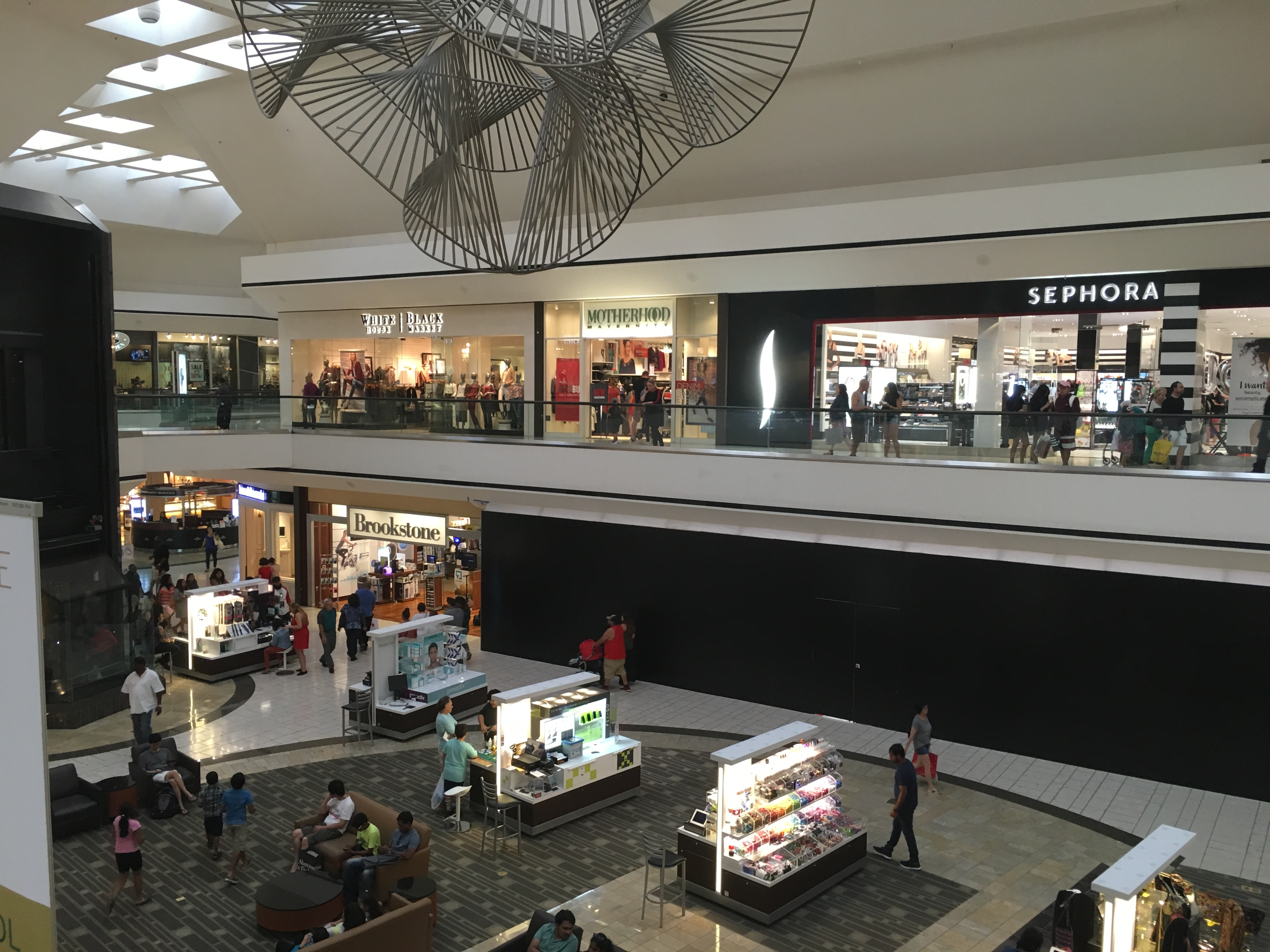
- Location: Pleasanton, California
- Coordinates: 37.695324°N 121.928678°W
- Opened: 1980; 46 years ago
- Developer: Taubman Centers
- Manager: Simon Property Group
- Owner: Simon Property Group (49.9%) and GM Pension Trust
- Num. of stores: 165
- Num. of anchor tenants: 5 (2 open, 3 vacant)
- Floor area: 1,299,290 square feet (120,708 square meters)
- Floors: 2 (3 in Macy's Women and former Nordstrom)
- Public transit: West Dublin/Pleasanton
- Website: www.simon.com/mall/stoneridge-shopping-center

Stoneridge Shopping Center is an upscale major shopping mall in Pleasanton, California. The mall is managed and co-owned by Simon Property Group, and is adjacent to Interstate 680. The mall's anchors are two Macy's stores. There are three vacant anchors, formerly occupied by Sears, JCPenney and Nordstrom.

== History ==
Stoneridge Shopping Center opened on September 4, 1980, as part of the Stoneridge master-planned neighborhood, which was developed by Stoneson Development Corporation, whose founders also developed Lakeside Village and Stonestown Galleria in nearby San Francisco after World War II.

The mall itself was developed by A. Alfred Taubman, also responsible for several other shopping malls in the Bay Area, including Eastridge Mall in San Jose, Hilltop Mall in Richmond and Sunvalley Mall in Concord. The original anchor tenants were Macy's, Emporium-Capwell, and JCPenney. Nordstrom opened an anchor store in 1990, the same year Emporium-Capwell dropped its double-barrelled name and became simply Emporium. In 1996, Emporium was acquired by the parent company of Macy's, which elected to keep both locations; the original Macy's store was used for their women's department, while men's and home furnishings were relocated to the former Emporium store, rebranded as Macy's. 1996 also saw the construction and opening of a Sears anchor store.

Taubman became a publicly traded real estate investment trust in 1992. In 1998, the GM Pension Trust assumed full ownership of Stoneridge, retaining Taubman Centers as manager. In 2004 the GM Pension Trust sold a half interest in a portfolio of shopping centers, including Stoneridge, to the Mills Corporation, which also assumed management of the mall. In 2007, a joint venture led by Simon Property Group purchased The Mills Corp., bringing Stoneridge under the Simon banner.

Plans to renovate and expand the property were announced in 2005, calling for the construction of a new, smaller Nordstrom store and the addition of new shops, restaurants, and a cinema within the existing Nordstrom building's footprint. The only portion of the plans to materialize was the addition of two freestanding restaurants outside the mall - The Cheesecake Factory and P. F. Chang's China Bistro, both of which opened in 2006.

Sears filed for bankruptcy on October 15, 2018 and announced the closure of the Stoneridge location as part of an plan to close 142 stores nationwide. The store closed in January 2019.

The Nordstrom anchor store closed on May 7, 2020, as a result of economic impact of the COVID-19 pandemic.

In 2019, Simon announced plans to redevelop the site of the shuttered Sears anchor store, and in 2023 they announced similar plans for the site of the shuttered Nordstrom anchor store.

The JCPenney anchor store closed on February 22, 2026, leaving the two Macy's stores as the last remaining anchors.
