= Marissa Streit =

Israeli-American businesswoman

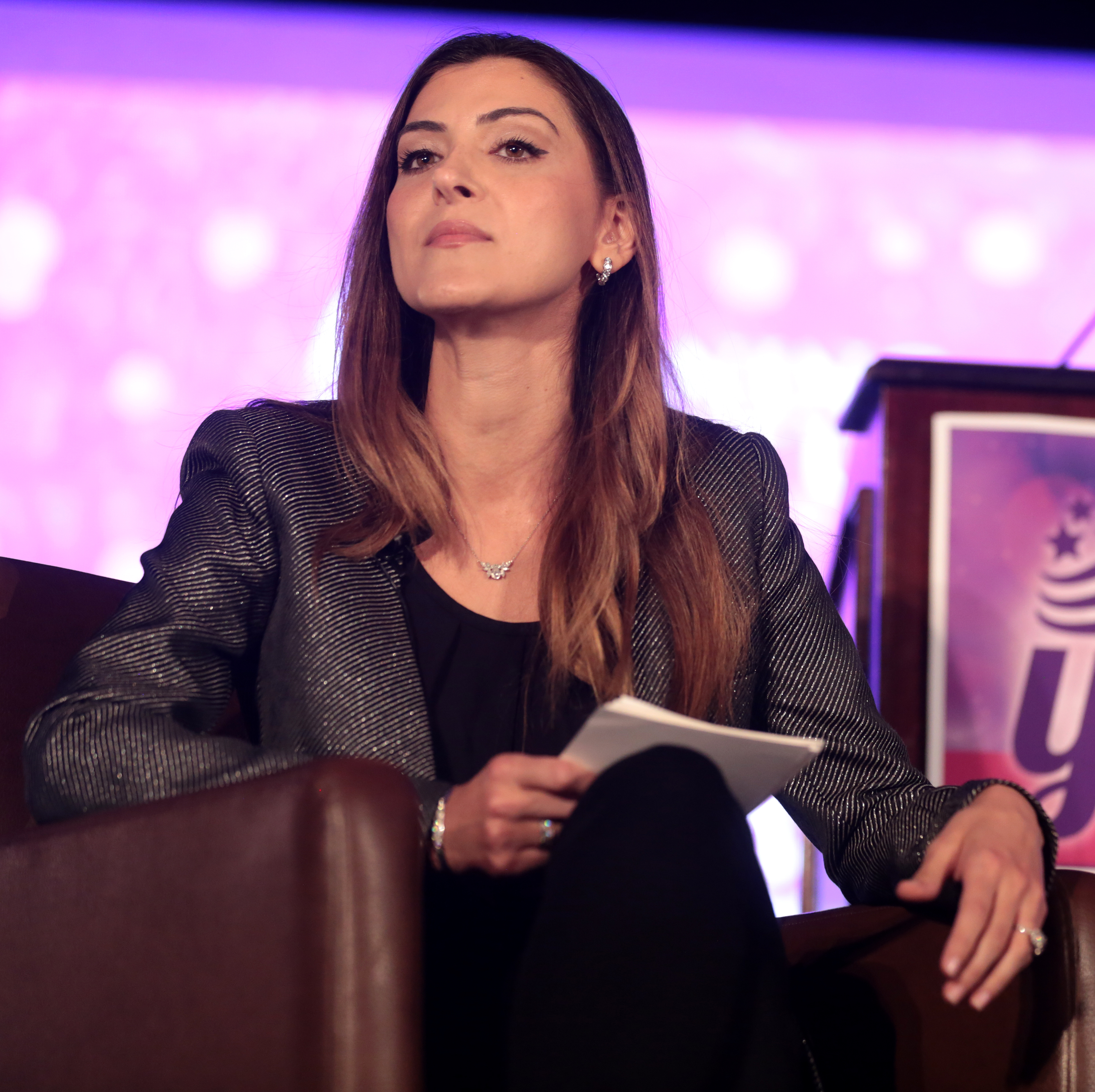
- Streit speaking with attendees at the 2018 Young Women's Leadership Summit
- Born: August 28, 1981 (age 45); Los Angeles, California, US
- Citizenship: American and Israeli
- Education: University of California, Los Angeles
- Occupation: Businesswoman
- Known for: CEO of conservative media organization PragerU

Marissa Streit is an American-Israeli businesswoman who is CEO of PragerU, a conservative media organization.

== Early life and education ==
Streit was born in Los Angeles, the daughter of an Australian father and Moroccan mother. Her parents met in Israel. Following her parents' divorce, Streit and her mother moved to Israel at age 7.

Streit, who is Jewish, completed her primary education in Israel, and later served in the Israel Defense Force's military intelligence Unit 8200. After completing her military service, Streit attended the University of California, Los Angeles, studying business and economics.

== Career ==
Following her graduation, she returned to California and taught fourth and fifth grade, later becoming headmistress of a school in Manhattan Beach and worked as the director of operations for the Israeli-American Council.

Streit described her push to activism as a result of Israel's portrayal in American media and growing anti-Zionism, along with the role of teacher's unions.

In 2009, Streit joined PragerU, a non-profit promoting conservative and capitalist viewpoints. In 2011 she was promoted to its Chief Executive Officer position.

Streit has overseen PragerU's vision of "edutainment", focusing on cartoons and five-minute YouTube videos to promote the conservative and pro-Israel point of view on various issues; some of which contain false claims about climate change.

Streit has criticized the teaching of climate change in schools, including in Florida. She has overseen the expansion of PragerU teaching material to Texas schools.

In August 2025, Streit interviewed Hungarian prime minister Viktor Orbán on Hungary's relationship with the European Union.
