= Henry G. Plitt =

American businessman and war hero (1918–1993)

- Born: Henry G. Plitt; 1918; New York City, US
- Died: January 26, 1993 (age 74); Beverly Hills, California, US
- Education: B.A. Syracuse University; J.D. Saint Lawrence University
- Known for: Founder of Plitt Theatres
- Spouse: Sedge Plitt
- Children: 3

Henry G. Plitt (1918 – January 26, 1993) was an American businessman and war hero who founded Plitt Theatres.

== Biography ==
Plitt was born to a Jewish family in New York City. He graduated with a B.A. from Syracuse University and a J.D. from Saint Lawrence University School of Law. He was a member of the New York State Bar. After school, he served with the 101st Airborne Division during World War II where he parachuted into France during D-Day; and was awarded the Silver Star, the Bronze Star, four Purple Hearts, the Croix de Guerre and the Dutch Lanyard. In 1944, he returned to the U.S. as a war hero and went on the circuit soliciting the sale of war bonds. He later returned to Europe as a major where he participated in the liberation of Dachau and the capture of Nazi war criminals including Julius Streicher in Waidring, Tirol on May 24, 1945.

After the war in 1949, he served as a district manager in Ohio, West Virginia and Kentucky and an executive at Paramount Theatres under Leonard Goldenson (who had headed the theater chain since 1938). Paramount Theatres was the theater division of Paramount Pictures, which was in turn an agglomeration of theaters previously acquired by Paramount, notably Balaban and Katz and Famous Players–Lasky. Paramount was required to divest the theater chain, renamed United Paramount Theatres (UPT), as a result of the U.S. Supreme Court decision in the case United States v. Paramount Pictures, Inc. (1948). In 1949, he was promoted to division manager. In 1953, UPT merged with the American Broadcasting Company, providing ABC's television network a stable source of cash flow which enabled it to survive and eventually become competitive. In 1955, Plitt was appointed president of the Paramount-Richards circuit and in 1959, as president of ABC Films Syndication where he served until 1965. In 1974, Plitt purchased a 61% interest in ABC Theatres northern group of movie theaters for $65 million and in 1978, he purchased ABCs`s southern circuit for $49 million; thus ending ABC's involvement in the theater industry. His minority partners were Thomas J. Klutznick (son of Philip Klutznick) (25%); and Roy H. Aaron (14%). He renamed the chain Plitt Theatres and grew the chain to 600 screens which was at the time the largest independently owned theater chain in the United States. In 1985, he sold the chain to Cineplex Odeon (founded by Canadians Garth Drabinsky and Nat Taylor in 1979) for $130 million.

In May 1985, Plitt invested in Showscan Film Corp., which purchased the Showscan motion-picture process and patents rights from Brock Hotel Corp. and filmmaker Douglas Trumbull for an equity stake and cash; he planned to build a 30 theater chain worldwide that would uses the Showscan film and projectors. He then founded a new theatre company, the Plitt Amusement Co., which consisted of nine theaters in Washington state.

== Philanthropy ==
Plitt was a major benefactor of Jewish organizations including the Beverly Hills Maple Center. He served as chairman of the National Board of Friends of the Israel Defense Forces and was president of the West Coast Friends of Bar-Ilan University in Israel (which awarded him an honorary doctorate degree in 1991).

== Personal life ==
Plitt was married to Sedge Plitt; they had two sons and a daughter, Ed, Sam, and Sedge Plitt Halpern. On January 26, 1993, Plitt died of pancreatic cancer at his home in Beverly Hills, California. Funeral services were held at the Stephen S. Wise Temple in Los Angeles with an additional memorial service held at Riverside Memorial Chapel in New York City.
