= Onyx Creative =

Onyx Creative is an American architecture and design firm based in Cleveland, with offices in Tucson, Ventura, California, Los Angeles, Atlanta, Baltimore, and Portland, Maine. It was founded in 1974 by Jerry Herschman as Herschman Architects.

== Corporate history ==
Herschman specialized in designing interior spaces for commercial and retail clients, expanding its scope to complete buildings in the mid-1990s. In 2018, the name was changed to Onyx Creative.
