= Southern Theatres =

Chain of movie theaters

- Type: Private company
- Industry: Movie theaters
- Founded: 2002
- Fate: Acquired by Santikos Theatres
- Headquarters: New Orleans, Louisiana, United States
- Number of locations: 18
- Key people: James Wood, CEO; Ron Krueger II, President; George Solomon, founder Trent Hickman, VSS
- Subsidiaries: The Grand Theatre; AmStar Cinemas

Southern Theatres was an American movie theater chain based in New Orleans, Louisiana. It was founded by George Solomon in May 2002. It operated two brands: The Grand Theatre, and AmStar Cinemas.

Southern Theaters purchased AmStar Entertainment in 2007, a chain of 7 multiplexes across the southern United States. In 2023, the chain was acquired by Santikos Theatres, which purchased the chain from Veronis Suhler Stevenson. Veronis Suhler Stevenson had purchased a minority stake in the chain in April 2005 and later took majority control.

Prior to its acquisition by Santikos, Southern Theatres operated 18 multiplex stadium-seating movie theaters (12 with luxury seating), with 266 combined screens in Alabama, Florida, Georgia, Louisiana, Mississippi, North Carolina, South Carolina and Texas, making it at one time the sixteenth-largest theater chain in the U.S.
