= Plitt Theatres =

Defunct American movie theater chain

- Type: Private subsidiary
- Industry: Entertainment
- Founders: Adolph Zukor
- Successor: Cineplex Odeon
- Headquarters: New York City, New York
- Services: Movie exhibition
- Revenue: $168 million (1984)
- Net income: $11 million (1984)

Plitt Theatres was a major movie theater chain in the United States and went under a number of names, Publix Theaters Corporation, Paramount Publix Corporation, United Paramount Theatres, American Broadcasting-Paramount Theatres and ABC Theatres and operated a number of theater circuits under various names.

The chain was originally the theater division of Paramount Pictures, incorporating a number of theater circuits acquired by Paramount, notably Balaban and Katz. Paramount was required to divest the theater chain as a result of the U.S. Supreme Court decision in the case United States v. Paramount Pictures, Inc. (1948).

== History ==
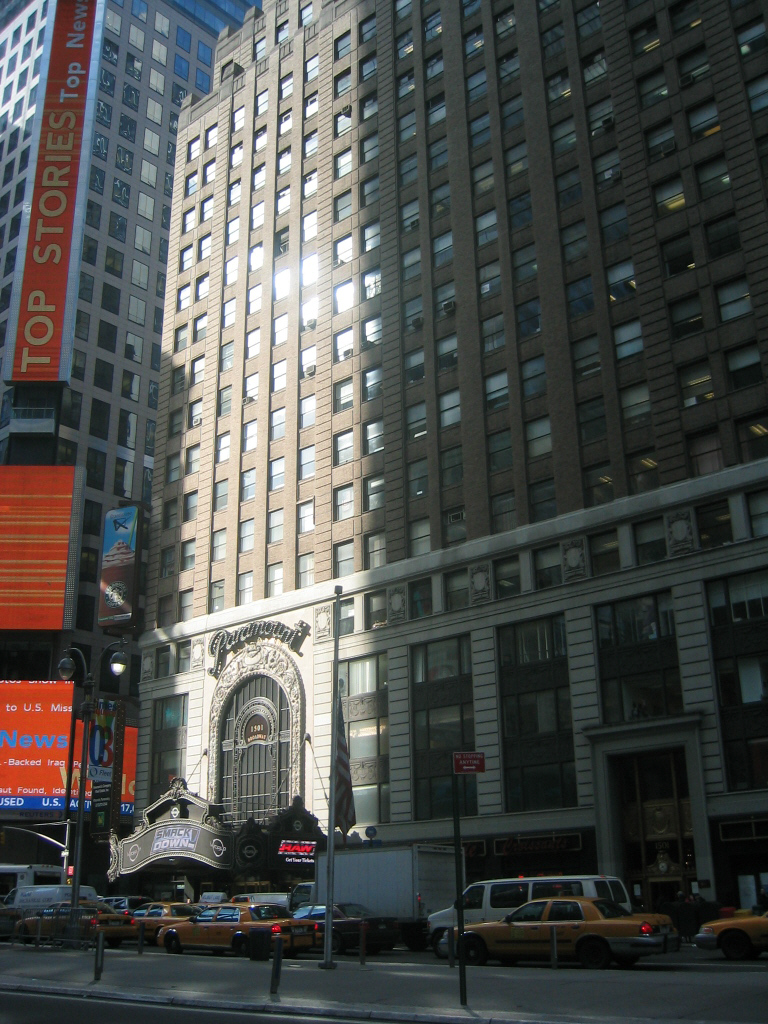
1501 Broadway served as the corporate headquarters for United Paramount Theatres.

The Publix Theaters Corporation was found in 1925 by the merger of the Balaban and Katz chain with Famous Players–Lasky Corporation theater chain. By 1930, the company owned 1,210 theaters in the US and Canada when the company changed its name to Paramount Publix Corporation. In early February 1933, Paramount-Publix was placed in equity receivership, under receivers Adolph Zukor and Charles D. Hilles, followed by voluntary bankruptcy in March. On November 21, 1934, the three major security holders committees submitted a plan for Paramount Publix to be combined with Paramount Famous-Players Lasky into a new corporation. A reorganization plan for Paramount Publix, the first large corporation to attempt reorganization under the then new bankruptcy, was approved by Bankruptcy Judge Alfred C. Coxe in April 1935 to end the proceeding.

Theater circuit (in 1955)	state(s)
Arizona Paramount	Arizona: Rialto, Orpheum
Balaban and Katz	Illinois
Florida State	Florida
Great States	Illinois, Indiana, Ohio
Minnesota Amusement	Minnesota, Wisconsin, North & South Dakotas
New England	Massachusetts, Maine, Vermont, New; Hampshire, Connecticut, Rhode Island
Northio	Ohio, Kentucky
Paramount Gulf	Louisiana, Mississippi, Alabama, Florida, Texas
Penn Paramount	Pennsylvania
Tenarken Paramount	Arkansas, Tennessee, Kentucky
Texas Consolidated	Texas
Tri-States	Iowa, Nebraska, Illinois, Missouri
United Detroit	Michigan
Wilby-Kincey	Alabama, Georgia, North & South Carolina, Tennessee, Virginia, West Virginia

On December 31, 1949, the theater business was spun off into an independent company called United Paramount Theatres, headed by Leonard Goldenson. In 1953, UPT merged with the American Broadcasting Company, providing ABC's television network with a source of cash flow that enabled it to survive and eventually become competitive.

The merged company was named American Broadcasting-Paramount Theatres (AB-PT). No general theater division similar to the ABC division was set up as AB-PT corporate would handle overall theater planning and development. Having only full ownership of 449 theaters at the time of the consent agreement and all joint ownership interest were to be ended. By March 1957, AB-PT's 5 theater circuits had sold off more theaters than ordered. In June, AB-PT decided to sell an additional 90 locations due to decline revenue.

In 1965, the corporation was renamed American Broadcasting Companies, Inc., and the theater chain was renamed ABC Theatres. In 1965, Samuel H. Clark was appointed vice-president, non-broadcasting operation of American Broadcasting Companies overseeing ABC-Paramount Records, ABC music publishing, theater operations, ABC Pictures, ABC Amusements and other operations. By May 1972, ABCs formed the ABC Leisure Group consisting of its theaters, farm publishing operations (ABC Farm Publications) and music (ABC Records), Anchor Records and ABC Records and Tape Sales plus a new retail record store division.

=== Plitt Theatres ===
Plitt Theatres, owned partly by former ABC Films Syndication president Henry G. Plitt, purchased ABC Theatres northern group of 123 single-screen movie theaters including the Balaban & Katz chain in 1973. A second Plitt corporation, Plitt Theatres Holding, purchased ABCs's southern circuit of 400 theaters in 1978 for $49 million, thus ending ABC's involvement in the theater industry.

Plitt Theatres and its companion corporation in 1985 was owned by Henry G. Plitt (61%), chairman and founder, Thomas J. Klutznick (of Chicago) partnership (25%); and President Roy H. Aaron (14%). In November 1985, Plitt Theaters was sold for $135 million to a group that included a Canadian firm Cineplex Odeon Cinemas (50%), Odyssey Partners and Furman Selz Mager Dietz & Birney Inc. A group of theaters that Plitt had previously put for sale was spun off the selling owners with Cineplex managing them until sold.

In May 1985, Henry Plitt invested in Showscan Film Corp., which purchased the Showscan motion-picture process and patents rights from Brock Hotel Corp. and filmmaker Douglas Trumbull for an equity stake and cash. Plitt became chairman. Showscan Film planned to build a 30 theater chain worldwide that would uses the Showscan film and projectors.

In March 1986, Plitt made an $7.7 million offer for Septum Theatre Circuit, an Atlanta-based theater chain owning 78 screens at 12 locations with 3 location under construction with 16 screens total. Plitt Amusement Co. of Los Angeles had agreed to purchase from Plitt 38 movie theaters in Utah, Idaho, Minnesota, Oregon and Washington. By August 1990, the deal was in jeopardy.
