= Disney anthology television series =

Anthology television series

- Opening title for The Wonderful World of Disney used from 2022 onward (with the "Presented by Disney+" tagline from 2022 to 2023 (later reappeared in 2024 and 2025); currently used in promos)
- Also known as: Walt Disney's Disneyland (1954–1959); Walt Disney Presents (1959–1961); Walt Disney's Wonderful World of Color (1961–1968); Disney's Wonderful World (1979–1981); Walt Disney (1981–1983); The Disney Sunday Movie (1986–1988); The Magical World of Disney (1988–1990); The Wonderful World of Disney (1968–1979, 1983–1987, 1991–present)
- Genre: Anthology series
- Created by: Walt Disney
- Presented by: Walt Disney (1954–1966); Michael Eisner (1986–2002)
- Narrated by: Dick Wesson (1954–1979; 2007–2008); Mark Elliott (1979–1988, 1997–2000, 2006–2007); Ernie Anderson (1986–1988); Danny Dark (1988–1991); Bill Rice (1997–2000); Andy Geller (2000–2006)
- Theme music composer: Leigh Harline; Ned Washington
- Opening theme: "When You Wish Upon a Star" (1954–1961, 1968–2012, 2012–present; various instrumental adaptations); "The Wonderful World of Color" (1961–1968); "Heaven's Triumph" (2012–present)
- Country of origin: United States
- Original language: English
- No. of seasons: 58
- No. of episodes: 2,207 (list of episodes)

Production
- Camera setup: Multi-camera (hosted segments)
- Running time: 30–180 minutes
- Production company: The Walt Disney Company

Original release
- Network: ABC
- Release: October 27, 1954 – June 11, 1961
- Network: NBC
- Release: September 24, 1961 – August 16, 1981
- Network: CBS
- Release: September 26, 1981 – May 21, 1983
- Network: ABC
- Release: February 2, 1986 – May 22, 1988
- Network: NBC
- Release: October 9, 1988 – August 17, 1991
- Network: CBS
- Release: October 1, 1991 – June 15, 1997
- Network: ABC
- Release: September 28, 1997 – present

The Walt Disney Company has produced an anthology television series since 1954 under several titles and formats. The program title The Wonderful World of Disney was used from 1969 to 1979 and again from 1991 onward. The program moved among the Big Three television networks in its first four decades, but has aired on ABC since 1997.

The original version of the series premiered on ABC in 1954. The show was broadcast weekly on one of the Big Three television networks until 1983. After a two-year hiatus, it resumed, running regularly until 1991. From 1991 until 1997, the series aired infrequently.

The program resumed a regular schedule in 1997 on the ABC fall schedule, following Disney's purchase of ABC in 1995. Until 2008, the program aired regularly on ABC. ABC continued the series as an occasional special presentation from 2008 to 2022. In 2020, the series began airing movies from the Disney+ library. In 2022, The Wonderful World of Disney returned to the regular ABC schedule, airing on Sunday nights in the winter and spring.

The show has only had two hosts: Disney co-founder Walt Disney and former Disney chairman and CEO Michael Eisner.

The show is the second longest-running prime-time program on American television, behind Hallmark Hall of Fame.

== Titles ==
- Walt Disney's Disneyland (1954–1958; ABC)
- Walt Disney Presents (1958-1961; ABC)
- Walt Disney's Wonderful World of Color (1961–1969; NBC)
- The Wonderful World of Disney (first era; 1969-1979; NBC)
- Disney's Wonderful World (1979–1981; NBC)
- Walt Disney (1981–1983; CBS)
- The Disney Sunday Movie (1986–1988; ABC;)
- The Magical World of Disney (1988–1991; NBC)
- The Magical World of Disney on Disney Channel (1996–2002; Disney Channel)
- The Magical World of Disney Junior (2012–2021; Disney Junior)
- The Wonderful World of Disney (second era; 1991–1997; CBS)
- The Wonderful World of Disney (third era; 1997–present; ABC)
- The Wonderful World of Disney: Presented by Disney+ (2020–2023 (later reappeared in 2024); ABC and Disney+) (currently used in promos)

== History ==
The anthology series was an outgrowth of Walt Disney looking for funding for Disneyland, with his brother Roy Disney approaching all the big-three networks and American Broadcasting-Paramount Theatres taking the deal for programming for ABC.

=== Walt Disney's Disneyland (1954–1959) ===
Although Walt Disney was the first major film producer to venture into television, two established independent film producers successfully ventured into television production before Disney, Hal Roach and Jerry Fairbanks. Disney wanted to produce a television program to finance the development of the Disneyland amusement park. After being rejected by both CBS and NBC, Disney eventually signed a deal with ABC (which had merged with United Paramount Theatres in 1953) on March 29, 1954. The show contained teasers for Disney's park, as well as episodes representing life in one of the park's main sections: Adventureland, Tomorrowland, Fantasyland, and Frontierland, with the opening titles used from its inception until the show's move to NBC in 1961, showing the entrance to Disneyland itself, as well as the four aforementioned lands, one of which was then identified as the main feature of that evening's program.

Consequently, Davy Crockett and other pioneers of the Old West, and American history in general, appeared in "Frontier Land". Similarly, 20,000 Leagues Under the Sea would be the focus of an evening spent in "Adventure Land", although a documentary on the film could also be possibly presented as a topic for such episodes, including clips from the actual film. Topics for "Fantasy Land" would include either actual cartoons, and animated films, or documentaries on "The Making of ..." (such as behind-the-scenes presentation of Peggy Lee singing the duet of the wicked Siamese cats in Lady and the Tramp, or the barbershop quartet of lost dogs in the municipal Dog Pound); excerpts from a True-Life Adventure documentary might also be included (for example, one on the life and works of beavers and their dam-building) or those using stroboscopic stop-action photography (such as investigating what really happened when a rain-drop fell in a puddle, as part of a "Fantasy Land" episode), explaining the techniques of cartoon animation. The multiplane camera used to create the three-dimensional effects of Bambi was also a topic for a "Fantasy Land"-set telecast.

In the episode "An Adventure in Art", four different artists were given the task of drawing the same tree, with each artist using his own preferred ways of drawing and imagining a tree; this led to cartoon examples of differently animated trees, as in some of the early Silly Symphonies shorts, and later full-length animated films. "Tomorrow Land" was an opportunity for the Disney studio staff to present cutting-edge science and technology, and to predict possible futures, such as futuristic automobiles and highways, and featured Wernher von Braun as an on-air technical consultant in Man and the Moon, which aired on December 28, 1955. This format remained basically unchanged through the 1980s, though new material was scarce in later years. Other episodes were segments from Disney films such as Seal Island and Alice in Wonderland, or cartoons of Donald Duck and other Disney characters.

The program spawned the Davy Crockett craze of 1955, with the airing of a three-episode series (not shown over the course of consecutive weeks) about the historical American frontiersman, starring Fess Parker in the title role. Millions of dollars of merchandise relating to the title character were sold, and the theme song, "The Ballad of Davy Crockett", became a hit record that year. Three historically based hour-long programs aired during late 1954 and early 1955 and were followed up by two dramatized installments the following year. The television episodes were later edited into two theatrical films.

On July 17, 1955, the opening of Disneyland was covered on a live television special, Dateline: Disneyland, which is not technically considered to be part of the series. It was hosted by Art Linkletter, with whom Walt Disney had worked out a deal prior to the opening to allow Linkletter to lease a shop on Main Street in return for the broadcast. Art Linkletter was assisted by Bob Cummings and Ronald Reagan, and the program featured various other guests, including various appearances of Walt himself as he dedicated the various lands of Disneyland.

=== Walt Disney Presents (1958–1961) ===
In 1958, the series was retitled Walt Disney Presents and moved to a Friday night time slot; by 1960, ABC had switched it to Sunday nights, where it remained for 21 years. During this iteration, The Peter Tchaikovsky Story, an episode made to promote Disney's latest animated feature, Sleeping Beauty, was one of the first stereo simulcasts on television; in this case it was three channel stereo. FM radio stations across the country carried the left channel at the same time as ABC broadcast the television program in mono, which served as a center channel, and AM radio stations broadcast the right channel. In the second half of the show, a lengthy clip of Sleeping Beauty was shown, with its six channels (70 mm. version) mixed down into three for the broadcast. Walt Disney apparently wanted people to see Sleeping Beauty in 70 mm, so, in the introduction, he explained the difference between 35 mm and 70 mm and held up a card with both sizes on it. In addition to episodes devoted to the latest additions at Disneyland, many episodes during this period were Westerns such as "Texas John Slaughter" and "Elfego Baca", while others talked about the United States' burgeoning efforts to explore outer space and others, such as "Moochie of the Little League", were set in the then-present day. Some episodes even mixed live-action and animation, showing Mickey Mouse, Donald Duck, Goofy, Chip 'n' Dale, Professor Owl and Jiminy Cricket talking with Walt Disney himself, while one 1959 episode (titled "The Adventures of Chip 'n' Dale") turned the spotlight on Chip 'n' Dale, combining their theatrical cartoons with mixed media wrap-around footage including the chipmunks' own theme song. The episode's genre is a live action/animated musical comedy, and as the title suggests, it stars the titular chipmunks. At the end of the episode, Chip 'n' Dale sing their goodbyes to the audience and return to their nut home on the counter hoping the audience enjoyed their show.

=== Walt Disney's Wonderful World of Color (1961–1969) ===
Although the basic format remained the same, the series moved to NBC on September 24, 1961, to take advantage of that network's ability to broadcast programming in color. In addition, Walt Disney's relationship with ABC had soured as the network resisted selling its stake in the theme park before doing so in 1960. In a display of foresight, Disney had filmed many of the earlier shows in color, allowing them to easily be repeated on NBC; since all but three of Disney's feature-length films were also made in color (the three black-and-white exceptions were The Shaggy Dog, The Absent-Minded Professor, and Son of Flubber, all family comedies starring Fred MacMurray), they could now also be telecast in that format.

To emphasize the new feature, the series was retitled Walt Disney's Wonderful World of Color when NBC began airing it. The first NBC episode even dealt with the principles of color, as explained by a new character named Ludwig Von Drake (voiced by Paul Frees), a bumbling professor with a thick German accent, who was the uncle of Donald Duck. Von Drake was the first Disney character created specifically for television.

Walt Disney's Wonderful World of Color title sequence

Walt Disney died on December 15, 1966, 12 years after the anthology series premiered. While the broadcast that aired three days after his death featured a memorial tribute from The Huntley–Brinkley Report anchor Chet Huntley with film and television star Dick Van Dyke, the introductions that Disney had already filmed before his death continued to air for the remainder of the season. After that, the studio decided that Disney's persona as host was such a key part of the show's appeal to viewers that the host segment was removed. The final episode featuring Disney's host segment was the episode "A Salute to Alaska".

=== The Wonderful World of Disney (1969–1979) ===
The series was retitled The Wonderful World of Disney in September 1969, by which time the color distinction was no longer needed as all big three networks were broadcasting in color. It continued to gain solid ratings, often ranking in the top 20, until the mid-1970s.

In 1976, Disney showed its 1961 film The Parent Trap on television for the first time, as a 2½-hour special. This marked a major step in broadcasting for the studio, which had never shown one of its more popular films on television in a time slot longer than an hour (although it had shown Now You See Him, Now You Don't and Napoleon and Samantha in a two-hour format in 1975). Walt Disney Productions also began running some of its multi-episode television programs, such as 1962's Sammy The Way-Out Seal, as televised feature films on the anthology series. A slightly edited version of the 1954 Disney film 20,000 Leagues Under the Sea made its television debut as a two-hour special on NBC in October 1976. Several other Disney films, some of them not especially successful (such as Superdad, which was a failure in its initial theatrical release) were also aired on the program in the form of two-hour broadcasts that year. However, the multi-episode format for feature films had not been discontinued; by 1981, films such as Pollyanna were still being shown on the Disney program in several installments running a week apart.

During the early 1970s, the show gradually concentrated less on animated cartoons and dramatic or comedy films, and began to place an emphasis on nature-oriented programs (such as the True-Life Adventures).

The show's continued ratings success in the post-Walt Disney era started to decline during the 1975–76 season. At this time, Walt Disney Productions was facing a decline in fortunes due to falling box-office revenues, while NBC as a whole also saw a decrease in its ratings. The anthology series became even more dependent on airings of live-action theatrical features, its True-Life Adventures, reruns of older episodes, and cartoon compilations. Nothing from the Disney animated features canon aired, with the exceptions of Alice in Wonderland and Dumbo, as part of a long-standing policy placed on the program by Disney. Additionally, in 1975, when CBS regained the broadcast rights to the 1939 Metro-Goldwyn-Mayer film The Wizard of Oz, it was scheduled opposite Disney, as it had been between 1960 and 1968. At that time, telecasts of that film were highly rated annual events, which largely attracted the same family audience as the Disney series. From 1968 to 1975, when NBC held the television rights to Oz (which it had acquired from CBS in 1967), it usually pre-empted Disney to show it. However, the show's most notable weekly competition came from CBS's newsmagazine 60 Minutes.

In 1975, an amendment to the Prime Time Access Rule gave the Sunday 7:00 p.m. Eastern Time slot back to the networks, allowing NBC to move Disney back by a half-hour. It also allowed CBS to schedule 60 Minutes at 7:00 p.m. Eastern Time starting on December 7; prior to this, 60 Minutes had aired at 6:00 p.m. Eastern and did not begin its seasons until after the National Football League season ended. Disney fell out of the top 30, while 60 Minutes had its ratings rise significantly.

=== Disney's Wonderful World (1979–1981) ===
In September 1979, the studio agreed to then-NBC president Fred Silverman's request for changes to the program. The show shortened its title to Disney's Wonderful World, and updated the opening sequence with a computer-generated logo and disco-styled theme song, but largely kept the same format. The problems for the show continued. As a result of the ratings strength of 60 Minutes, compounded by low ratings, increasingly less original material, and frequent pre-emptions (primarily due to sporting events such as NFL game telecasts), NBC cancelled Disney in 1981. One factor that was beyond the control of either Disney or NBC was a 94-day strike by the Screen Actors Guild that cut the number of shows for the 1980–1981 season, but the damage was done nonetheless.

=== Walt Disney (1981–1983) ===
Following NBC's announcement that it would cancel the anthology series, CBS acquired the program and began airing it on Saturdays at 8:00 p.m. Eastern Time, in September 1981. Despite a more elaborate credit sequence and another title change, to simply Walt Disney, the series' format remained unchanged. During the 1981–1982 season, the series had a full season's worth of material again, but little of it was new. Among the little that actually was new were a handful of pilots based on Pollyanna, Escape to Witch Mountain, and The Apple Dumpling Gang, but only the last of the three pilots was sold and became the half-hour sitcom Gun Shy the following season, one of the studio's first entries in that genre but only lasted six episodes.

The 1982–1983 season had enough material to fill the time slot, but almost all of it was pre-existing material, the lone exception being the celebrity-laden opening ceremony of Epcot on October 23. The time slot for the program was also competitive to NBC, which aired the sitcoms Diff'rent Strokes and Silver Spoons at 8:00 p.m. and 8:30 p.m. up against it, causing some children and families to watch these programs instead. After moving to Tuesday at the beginning of 1983, it went on hiatus on February 15 while the aforementioned Gun Shy took up the second half of its time slot. When it returned for summer reruns on May 3, it was still on Tuesday at 8:00 p.m.; its final network broadcast was on September 24, ending an uninterrupted 29-year run on all three networks.

The end of the show coincided with the launch of the studio's cable television network, the Disney Channel. While ratings were a factor, the final decision to end the show came from Walt Disney Productions' then-CEO Card Walker, who felt that having both the show and the new channel active would result in cannibalization of viewership. The new channel would provide a home for the show in reruns for the next two decades, but for the time being, Disney's presence on American network television would be limited to the occasional holiday special, theme park anniversary, or cartoon compilation. The CBS version of the shows' intro would also be featured on Disney Channel.

=== The Disney Sunday Movie (1986–1988) ===
After the studio (which was renamed as the Walt Disney Company in 1986) underwent a change in management, Disney decided to revive some sort of programming to broadcast television. Their efforts led to the premiere of The Disney Sunday Movie, which debuted on February 2, 1986, on ABC. Many names were considered to serve as presenter for the revived show, including Julie Andrews, Dick Van Dyke, Cary Grant, Tom Hanks, Walter Cronkite, Roy E. Disney (who closely resembled his uncle), and even Mickey Mouse. The studio finally decided to have Michael Eisner, the company's recently hired CEO, host the series. Although he was not a performer, after filming a test video with his wife Jane and a member of his executive team (which required multiple takes), studio management believed he could do the hosting job. Eisner hired Michael Kay, a director of political commercials for then-U.S. Senator Bill Bradley, to help him improve his on-camera performance.

The Disney Sunday Movie initially aired as ABC's lead-off program on Sundays, running from 7:00 to 9:00 p.m. Eastern Time. By this point, the format was similar to a movie-of-the-week. Gary Barton, a Disney senior vice president, was in charge of the program. Help Wanted: Kids was the first episode's film. Other first revival year films were Young Again, The Richest Cat in the World, I-Man (starring Scott Bakula), and My Town. Sometimes the slot would feature a special instead of dramatic material, such as "Disney Goes to the Oscars" featuring the studio's Academy Award winners, and "The Greatest Moments in Disney Animation". A handful of Disney Channel original films made their network television debuts during these iteration as well, but the program did not present any film made by Disney's Touchstone subsidiary, as such films were not considered appropriate for children. However, Splash, Too, a sequel to the 1984 film, aired on the series over two weeks in May 1988. The series had increased Disney Park attendance and ABC's Sunday night ratings for the evening by an average 27% for the rest of the season. Disney, wanting to make it a regular viewing habit, gave ABC additional films from its library, including Old Yeller, The Apple Dumpling Gang and Candleshoe for the normal rerun mid-year period. The Last Electric Knight movie produced a spin-off series called Sidekicks (originally to be called Karate Kid) for ABC's 1987 season.

Despite improving ABC's numbers, the program's ratings were never strong as the established 60 Minutes and scripted mystery series Murder, She Wrote on CBS, both of which Disney was competing with for viewers, remained the leading primetime programs on Sunday nights. In 1987, ABC reduced The Disney Sunday Movie from two hours to one. The move did not increase ratings, and ABC decided not to renew its contract with Disney and cancel the second iteration of the anthology series.

The Disney Sunday Movie was also being run on the Disney Channel, also hosted by Eisner.

=== The Magical World of Disney (1988–1990) ===
In early 1988, NBC decided to renew its association with Disney after it had canceled the original anthology series seven years earlier; NBC reacquired the series, now named The Magical World of Disney, to serve as the lead-in of its Sunday lineup in September 1988. As the program had done during its last season as The Disney Sunday Movie, The Magical World of Disney ran for one hour, airing at 7:00 p.m. Eastern Time; Michael Eisner also returned as its host. During this period, the show attempted to reintroduce the rotating format the show started out with in 1954. It also introduced new versions of Walt Disney-era movies and television shows such as The Absent-Minded Professor, a reboot of Davy Crockett, and the musical Polly, which was based on the book Pollyanna by Eleanor H. Porter and the Walt Disney's 1960 film adaptation of it. New television animation came in the form of Super DuckTales (a compilation of an arc from Disney's syndicated animated series DuckTales) as an Easter special on March 26, 1989; another DuckTales special, A DuckTales Valentine, aired on February 11, 1990.

In the 1989–1990 season, during which Disney was negotiating with Jim Henson to acquire the Muppets, they aired two Muppet specials; one of them was The Muppets at Walt Disney World, which turned out to be Henson's last Muppet special. He died on May 16, 1990, ten days after the special aired, and Disney only acquired the Muppets more than a decade later.

After two seasons experiencing low ratings as it had accrued during the end of its initial NBC run and its subsequent runs on CBS and ABC, Disney elected to end the broadcast television run of The Magical World of Disney and began airing the anthology on the Disney Channel in the same time slot it had been airing for the previous few years, starting in September 1990, expanding back to a two-hour format. Since the Disney Channel operated as a premium channel at the time, films presented on the series were presented without commercial interruption. The Magical World of Disney originally aired on the cable channel as a weekly Sunday-only program for its first five years; but in December 1996, as part of the first phase of a programming revamp that culminated in its formal conversion into a commercial-free basic cable channel in April 1997, the Disney Channel expanded the Magical World brand to encompass its Monday through Saturday primetime film block, maintaining its 7:00 p.m. Eastern time slot.

=== The Wonderful World of Disney (1991–present) ===
The Wonderful World of Disney returned in 1991 as an umbrella title for Disney specials airing on major networks (CBS airings used the historical title The Wonderful World of Disney for the first few years, while other networks broadcast the show with another title, A Disney Special). During this time, one of the telefilms shown under the banner was spun off into its own series, The 100 Lives of Black Jack Savage, a collaboration with Stephen J. Cannell Productions.

In 1997, just two years after Disney acquired the network, ABC gave the series a regular slot on its schedule. Disney CEO Eisner formed Disney Telefilms by 1995, to supply original films to the series and program together with ABC. The network chose to have the program lead ABC's Sunday night lineup in the 7:00 p.m. Eastern time slot, resulting in the displacement of Sunday mainstay America's Funniest Home Videos, which had occupied the slot since the 1993–94 season. On September 28, 1997, the all-new Wonderful World of Disney premiered with the network television premiere of Toy Story. On October 5, 1997, Disney Telefilms' first production, Toothless, debuted on the series. In addition to the planned 16 original Disney telemovies, ABC and Disney added a few direct-to-video movies and films from other sources.

In 2001, a Spanish-language version of the program premiered on Telemundo (which was acquired by the English-language version's former home, NBC, that same year) as El Maravilloso Mundo de Disney, with more of a focus on Disney theatrical films than the English broadcasts at the time.

In September 2003, The Wonderful World of Disney moved to Saturdays at 8:00 p.m. Eastern, with its former Sunday time slot being filled by AFV (which returned to its original night that season) and drama series in the 8: 00 p.m. hour. Rare exceptions to the program's format occurred during this time; for example, a Little House on the Prairie miniseries ran for several weeks in 2005, under the Wonderful World of Disney banner. For most of its second run on ABC, the program aired throughout the television season, with the exception of the 2005–06 season (when it aired during the midseason only), and in 2007 and 2008 (when it was relegated to the summer months), with a broader array of films airing under the ABC Saturday Movie of the Week banner occupying the network's Saturday primetime slot at other times, when sports programming did not air. This echoes how the series eventually began airing in rotation with a broader array of family-friendly films which aired under the ABC Sunday Night Movie banner in the Sunday at 7:00pm slot, when special programming did not air. The series ended as a regular program in 2008.

At this point, the series began to shift focus toward Disney theatrical films, relying less on original television films; however, the series aired three Disney Channel Original Movies (2002's Cadet Kelly, 2008's Camp Rock and 2011's Phineas and Ferb the Movie: Across the 2nd Dimension, currently the only Disney Channel television films to have aired on a non-Disney Channel-branded network domestically) during its ABC run. The second ABC revival also included some family-oriented films produced by studios other than Disney under the Wonderful World banner, such as The Sound of Music from 20th Century Fox (which is presently owned by Disney, now known as 20th Century Studios).

=== Revival and presented by Disney+ (2015–present) ===
The logo used from 2015 to 2020

On December 12, 2015, ABC's The Wonderful World of Disney officially returned to its anthology format with a showing of Mary Poppins for the first time on ABC since 2002, hosted by Dick Van Dyke. Van Dyke took viewers on a tour through the Disney Archives, as they explored props and costumes from the production of Mary Poppins and discussed the film's history and context within the Disney legacy. It was then shown on February 21, 2016, with the special Disneyland 60, which honored Disneyland's 60th anniversary; on November 24, 2016, for their Magical Holiday Celebration, filmed at Walt Disney World; and on December 11, 2016, for the network television premiere of Frozen. On August 5, 2019, it was announced that The Wonderful World of Disney would present The Little Mermaid Live! on November 5, with Auliʻi Cravalho, Queen Latifah and Shaggy starring as Ariel, Ursula and Sebastian, respectively. The cast also included John Stamos as Chef Louis and Graham Phillips as Prince Eric. The special featured music from both the film and the Tony Award-nominated Broadway stage version and was performed in front of a live audience with giant projection surface. The title was used again on November 28, 2019, for a two-hour music special, The Wonderful World of Disney: Magical Holiday Celebration, hosted by Emma Bunton and Matthew Morrison.

On May 7, 2020, it was announced that The Wonderful World of Disney would revive its banner for a series of theatrical movies from the Disney+ library, which featured an updated title card, which includes Moana, Thor: The Dark World, Up, and Big Hero 6, for four weeks beginning May 20, 2020. A fifth week was later added, featuring the 2010 Disney/Pixar film, Toy Story 3, marking ten years since its theatrical release. The program returned on September 23, 2020, featuring the 2014 Marvel film, Guardians of the Galaxy, filling a gap in ABC's fall 2020 schedule. On October 9, 2020, ABC announced the program would return on October 14, with the broadcast television premiere of the 2017 Disney/Pixar film, Coco.

Captain America: The Winter Soldier aired on January 12, 2021. The 2015 live action film Cinderella aired on January 19, 2021.

On April 28, 2021, it was announced that the program would return on May 3, 2021, for five weeks with a series of theatrical movies from the Disney+ library, which includes the broadcast television premieres of Incredibles 2 and Finding Dory, Monsters, Inc., Tangled and The Princess and the Frog. On October 28, 2021, the program returned with the broadcast television premiere of the 2019 Disney/Pixar film Toy Story 4.

Hocus Pocus aired on September 29, 2022, to promote Hocus Pocus 2, which premiered on Disney+ a day later. Enchanted aired on November 17, 2022, to promote Disenchanted, which premiered on Disney+ a day later. During the airing of Hocus Pocus, a new title card premiered bookending with the new Disney100 logo to celebrate the Walt Disney Company's 100th anniversary. Avatar aired on December 11, 2022, to promote Avatar: The Way of Water, which premiered in theaters five days later. Home Alone aired on December 24, 2022.

In early 2023, the program returned for five weeks with a series of theatrical movies from the Disney+ library, which includes the 2019 CGI film The Lion King and Finding Nemo, as well as the broadcast television premiere of Iron Man and The Avengers. Due to the death of Barbara Walters on December 30, 2022, the schedule would be moved by a week and the broadcast television premiere of the 2017 live action film Beauty and the Beast was canceled but was instead replaced with the 2019 film The Lion King. In May 2023, it was announced the program would air on Sunday nights for three weeks in June (when the NBA Finals were not being played) in a two-hour block, it would also air on Sunday nights in the fall of that year with a three-hour block due to the impact of the 2023 Hollywood labor disputes.

In May 2024, it was announced that the program would return the following month with a showing of Inside Out to promote Inside Out 2, and that the program would air weekly on Sunday nights as part of ABC's 2024–25 schedule.

== Related anthology series ==
=== The Magical World of Toons ===
The Magical World of Toons was the daily prime time programming block featuring character's key series episodes coinciding with the launch of Disney's new channel, Toon Disney, on April 18, 1998. It continued at least until 2003.

=== The Magical World of Disney Junior ===
In 2012, Disney Junior launched a variant of the movie night anthology as The Magical World of Disney Junior on its new 24/7 channel. The channel also premiered its first Disney Junior Original Movie, Lucky Duck during Magical World on June 20, 2014.

== Reruns ==
Prior to the launch of the Disney Channel, several of the films and specials made for the anthology series were licensed to pay-TV networks such as HBO; in HBO's case, the kaleidoscopic-pattern titles that preceded them in the original run were retained.

Around the same time that the 1980s incarnations aired on ABC and NBC, reruns of older episodes of the Disney anthology series, airing under the Wonderful World of Disney banner, were syndicated to broadcast television stations throughout the United States as well as in various international markets. In Australia, the program aired on Network Seven on Saturdays at 6:30 pm, before it was discontinued in 1994, due to Optus Vision (later Foxtel)'s launch of a domestic version of the Disney Channel, with Saturday Disney replacing it as the channel's main block of Disney films.

Reruns of the shows were a staple of the Disney Channel for several years under the title Walt Disney Presents (which used the same title sequence as the 1980s CBS incarnation), when it was an outlet for vintage Disney cartoons, television series, and films, basically serving the same function that the anthology series served in the days before cable. The original opening titles were restored to the episodes in 1997. Reruns of the anthology series were discontinued when the channel excised all vintage programming from its schedule with the removal of its Vault Disney late-night block on September 8, 2002. However, a few select episodes are available on VHS or DVD (some of which are exclusive to the Disney Movie Club).

From 2014 to 2019, live-action Disney films from the 1950s to the 1980s including special episodes from Walt Disney's Wonderful World of Color aired on Turner Classic Movies, without commercial interruption, and presented uncut and with letterboxing on the network's standard-definition feed.

All of the episodes and existing material used on the series up to 1996 are listed in the Bill Cotter book The Wonderful World of Disney Television, which was released in 1997 by Hyperion Books (which was owned by the Walt Disney Company at the time of the book's publication).

== Programming ==
Originally hosted by Walt Disney himself, the original format of the Disney anthology series consisted of a balance of theatrical animated cartoons, live-action features, and other informational material (some original, some pre-existing) from the studio's library. For many years, the show also featured edited one-hour versions of such then-recent Disney films as Alice in Wonderland, and in other cases, telecasts of complete Disney films that were split into two or more one-hour episodes. Later original programs consisted of dramatizations of other historical figures and legends along the lines of the Davy Crockett mini-series. These included a miniseries based on Daniel Boone (not the Fess Parker characterization), Texas John Slaughter, Elfego Baca, Francis Marion (the "Swamp Fox") and 1977's Kit Carson and the Mountain Man (with Christopher Connelly as Kit Carson, Robert Reed as John C. Frémont, and Gregg Palmer as mountain man Jim Bridger).

Occasionally, a more educational segment would be featured (such as The Story of the Animated Drawing), including nature and animal programs similar to the True-Life Adventures that were released in theaters, as well as various dramatic installments which were either structured as single-part, two-part, and sometimes, multipart editions. Much of the original informational excerpts were to create awareness of Disneyland. In spite of essentially serving as advertisements for the park, entertainment value was emphasized, as well to make the shows palatable. Some of the program's informational content was formatted to promote then-upcoming feature film releases by the studio (such as 20,000 Leagues Under the Sea and Darby O'Gill and the Little People), with some programs focusing on the art and technology of animation itself.

This format generally stayed consistent in the later years of the program, with minor deviations (such as more wildlife programming) until The Disney Sunday Movie era, which began to rely more on original telefilms and specials as opposed to Disney library content; in certain cases, these films were intended to be spun-off into regular series (including The Last Electric Knight, which became the short-lived Sidekicks, and the equally short-lived 100 Lives of Black Jack Savage). During the 1997–2008 period on ABC, more original telefilms and recent Disney theatrical films made up the majority of the content; however, films from outside producers were featured occasionally, including Princess of Thieves (a production of Granada Media) and the 2001 remake of Brian's Song (produced by Columbia TriStar Domestic Television).

== Theme music ==
- From 1954 to 1961, the series used the song "When You Wish Upon a Star" as its theme. The recording was taken directly from the soundtrack of the movie Pinocchio. Once the title was changed to "Walt Disney Presents" in 1958, the theme was used only over the ending credits.
- From 1961 to 1968, an original song was used, "The Wonderful World of Color", written by Richard M. Sherman and Robert B. Sherman. This song helped to emphasize the use of color with its lyrics.
- From 1968 to 1979 (The Wonderful World of Disney), orchestral medleys of various Disney songs from movies and theme parks as theme songs.
- From 1979 to 1980 (Disney's Wonderful World), a disco-styled theme was written to emphasize the new visual changes, even though the format remained the same. John Debney composed the melody and John Klawitter wrote the lyrics.
  - From 1980 to 1981, the series replaced the Debney/Klawitter theme to an earlier orchestral medley theme, while keeping the 1979 credits motif and title.
- From 1981 to 1983 (Walt Disney), a short disco arrangement of "When You Wish Upon a Star", arranged by Frank Gari, served as theme against some elaborate, then-state-of-the-art computer graphics. CBC Television in Canada also used this title sequence and theme music for their own versions of the show. The sequence was also used as the opening sequence on international Walt Disney Home Video releases until 1987.
- From 1986 to 1988, a synthesized, pop rock arrangement of "When You Wish Upon a Star" with some clapping was the theme. This was used again for season of The Magical World of Disney on NBC from 1989 to 1991 and on The Disney Channel from 1991 to 1996.
- In 1988, an orchestral medley of "A Dream Is a Wish Your Heart Makes" and "When You Wish Upon a Star" was used. This was switched back to the 1986 theme in 1989.
- From 1991 to 1997, an orchestral medley of "When You Wish Upon a Star" and "Part of Your World" (the latter from Disney's then recent flim The Little Mermaid), composed by David Newman, was used for network airings of the show (known as The Wonderful World of Disney on CBS and A Disney Special on other networks). This theme was also used internationally.
- From 1997 to 2000, an orchestral medley of "When You Wish Upon a Star" and "A Whole New World" (the latter used in the movie Aladdin), composed by Bruce Broughton, were used; also used occasionally was the Louis Armstrong song "What a Wonderful World". This theme "Mickey Mouse March" is still used currently internationally.
- From 2000 to 2007, a newer orchestral arrangement of "When You Wish Upon a Star" with a wordless choir, composed by James Horner, was used for ABC airings in the United States. The opening title sequence was updated in 2007 to include the castle shown in the 2006 Disney logo, along with clips from Disney and Pixar films. This updated intro was also a promotion of the new Disney website, which launched earlier that year.
- From 2007 to 2008, another orchestral arrangement of "When You Wish Upon a Star" (in actuality, the theme from the 2006 Disney logo, written and composed by Mark Mancina and co-arranged with and orchestrated by David Metzger) and a new opening title sequence (depicting the company's work with audio from Walt Disney himself) are used for ABC airings in the United States.
- From 2015 onwards, "Heaven's Triumph", composed by Robert Etoll via Q-Factory, is used alongside a newer opening title sequence (updated with a longer voice-over from Walt Disney and including clips of films from the Star Wars franchise and Marvel Studios). The opening title sequence was updated in 2020 to add "Presented by Disney+" text to the show's title card (with the animated 2019 Disney+ logo) as the 2006 Disney logo (without the text) was shortened, and September 29, 2022, to replace the 2006 Disney logo with the Disney100 version of the 2022 Disney logo (without the text), in celebration of The Walt Disney Company's 100th anniversary in 2023, as in which the "Presented by Disney+" text (with the animated 2019 Disney+ logo) was shown earlier as the program's logo was being shown. After that, it transitions to the print Disney100 logo. On December 11, 2022, the intro was updated with the print Disney100 logo removed as the "Presented by Disney+" text was still shown for the rest of the intro, due to the addition of films from 20th Century Studios, Touchstone Pictures and Hollywood Pictures. However, a scene from the featured movie is shown as well, starting with Hocus Pocus (that scene was later used in Enchanted, due to an editing mistake). On June 2, 2023, the "Presented by Disney+" text was removed. However, on October 1, 2023, the print Disney100 logo was added back to the title card, now smaller in size. It was reverted to the previous version on January 7, 2024. The "Presented by Disney+" tagline reappeared on October 20, 2024 and January 12, 2025. On August 17, 2025, certain films feature special introductions from key staff and cast members. On October 26, 2025, themed versions are used, which replaced or plastered the logo with seasonal backgrounds. On May 3, 2026, the ABC logo screenbug is shown on the bottom right, while the hashtag "#TheWonderfulWorldOfDisney" is shown on the bottom left before the logo is shown. On August 2, 2026, the TV rating icon is shown on the top left of the screen during the intro on certain films.

== International broadcasts ==
=== Argentina ===
==== The Telefe era ====
El mundo de Disney (The World of Disney) premiered on the OTA network Telefe in 1990, hosted by Leonardo Greco. He remained as the sole presenter of the show, lasting until 1995, when the series concluded. The programme started airing at 8:00:pm nightly from the second half of 1990 until December 1992. By 1993, it was moved to weekday afternoons at 5:00 pm. In 1994, it shifted to Sunday afternoons, and aired a long marathon of movies and cartoons. According to Greco, this programme was possible because of a distributor who acquired the material, and was allowed to be shown without following a strict format, because the company wanted to do so. In 2004, Telefe wanted a revival and appointed chef and host Maru Botana (then network talent) to present Planeta Disney (Disney Planet) on Sunday evenings, at 8:00pm, beginning November 21, 2004. Starting on July 9, 2005, Botana was replaced with two personalities employed by Disney, Carolina Ibarra and Dani Martins. They both shared the duties of hosting this show and the South American edition of Zapping Zone, on Disney Channel. This lasted for a year and a half, with relative success.

==== The Canal 13 era ====
While Telefe had a major success carrying the animated movies and some television series like Blossom or Dinosaurs (distributed by Buena Vista Television), Canal 13 saw the possibility of buying material from the company and airing it (sometimes competing against the Telefe's program) on Sunday afternoons, beginning in 1994, which at that time was filled with telecasts of ancient Argentinian films from the 1950s, 1960s or 1970s, and by reruns of Tarzan and The Three Stooges. The only clear difference was that only movies starring human actors, like Chitty Chitty Bang Bang or The Island at the Top of the World, could be broadcast, and not the cartoons. This experiment lasted until early 1996. By 2007, Telefe began holding the exclusive rights to show all the Disney franchise movies and programs, and began to air its movies on Sunday evenings at 7:00 pm, without a host. This also allowed Canal 13 to detain rights for other shows not related with Disney, but with the ABC network, like Lost or Grey's Anatomy, and to produce a localized version of the high-grossing film High School Musical.

=== Australia ===
The Wonderful World of Disney was broadcast on the Seven Network in the 70s and 80s, it was later replaced by Saturday Disney. Network 10 showed it in the mid 90s.The Wonderful World of Disney moved to Saturday nights on the Nine Network and Friday nights on Nine's multichannel, 9Go!. In 2020, The Wonderful World Of Disney moved to Friday, Saturday and Sunday nights on Seven's multichannel, 7flix.

=== Brazil ===
The ABC run of the program under The Magical World of Disney title originally aired in that country under the title Cine Disney, now as O Mundo Mágico de Disney and Sessão de Filmes Domingo Disney, on the Brazilian-Portuguese version of Sistema Brasileiro de Televisão (SBT) in partnership with The Walt Disney Company. The ABC run of the program under The Wonderful World of Disney title originally aired in that country under the title O Mundo Maravilhoso de Disney on the Brazilian Portuguese version of Disney Channel; the program moved to SBT as Mundo Disney in 2015, for return in partnership with The Walt Disney Company, which ended in 2018.

=== Canada ===
CBC aired Disney shows for many years. Disney Movies were simsubbed in the 1970s, 1980s and 1990s on CBS, NBC and ABC with the CBC broadcast via cable and later with satellite. CTV aired The Santa Clause but later moved to CBC. The movies moved to 4pm eastern many times to prevent simsubbing. Starting in 2023, the CTV Television Network acquired the rights to The Wonderful World of Disney, and has since aired it on both CTV and CTV2. However, CTV does not use the intro or a host for the series, and only airs the movies.

=== France ===
The series aired under two incarnations on French television: Disney Parade, which mostly consisted of animated films, aired on TF1 from February 1989 until December 1998, while Disney: une soirée au cinéma, which mostly consisted of live-action films, aired on La Cinq from April 1991 until February 1992, a few weeks before La Cinq ceased operations.

=== United Kingdom ===
The rights to broadcast the series were held by the BBC throughout the 1970s and into the 1980s. Originally broadcast as Walt Disney: The Wonderful World of Colour from September 1971, its title changed to The Wonderful World of Disney the following year and remained until the final broadcast in September 1983. Almost all the broadcasts ended with an orchestral version of the "Wonderful World of Color" theme. With only a handful of exceptions, the broadcasts tended to be on Friday or Saturday early evenings. Additionally, the BBC broadcast Disney Time, one-off programmes usually restricted to holidays, with a celebrity presenter introducing extracts from Disney films. This series was first broadcast on December 25, 1964 (introduced by Julie Andrews) and ended on December 26, 1997 (hosted by Keith Chegwin).

== Episodes ==
- List of Walt Disney anthology television series episodes (seasons 1–29) (1954–1983)
- List of Walt Disney anthology television series episodes (seasons 30–present) (1983–present)

== Ratings ==
=== Nielsen seasonal ratings ===
Network	Season	Time slot	TV Season	Season premiere	Season finale	Season Rank	Viewers (m)
ABC	1	Wednesday 7:30 p.m. ET	1954–1955	October 27, 1954	July 13, 1955	#6	12.00
ABC	2	Wednesday 7:30 p.m. ET	1955–1956	September 14, 1955	May 30, 1956	#4	13.05
ABC	3	Wednesday 7:30 p.m. ET	1956–1957	September 12, 1956	June 5, 1957	#14	12.37
ABC	4	Wednesday 7:30 p.m. ET	1957–1958	September 11, 1957	May 14, 1958		
ABC	5	Friday 8:00 p.m. ET	1958–1959	October 3, 1958	May 29, 1959		
ABC	6	Friday 7:30 p.m. ET	1959–1960	October 2, 1959	April 1, 1960		
ABC	7	Sunday 6:30 p.m. ET	1960–1961	October 16, 1960	June 11, 1961		
NBC	8	Sunday 7:30 p.m. ET	1961–1962	September 24, 1961	April 15, 1962	#23	11.02
NBC	9	Sunday 7:30 p.m. ET	1962–1963	September 23, 1962	March 24, 1963	#24	11.22
NBC	10	Sunday 7:30 p.m. ET	1963–1964	September 29, 1963	May 17, 1964	#21	11.87
NBC	11	Sunday 7:30 p.m. ET	1964–1965	September 20, 1964	April 4, 1965	#11	13.54
NBC	12	Sunday 7:30 p.m. ET	1965–1966	September 19, 1965	April 10, 1966	#17	12.49
NBC	13	Sunday 7:30 p.m. ET	1966–1967	September 11, 1966	April 2, 1967	#19	11.85
NBC	14	Sunday 7:30 p.m. ET	1967–1968	September 10, 1967	April 28, 1968	#25	11.73
NBC	15	Sunday 7:30 p.m. ET	1968–1969	September 15, 1968	March 23, 1969	#22	12.41
NBC	16	Sunday 7:30 p.m. ET	1969–1970	September 14, 1969	March 29, 1970	#9	13.81
NBC	17	Sunday 7:30 p.m. ET	1970–1971	September 13, 1970	March 14, 1971	#14	13.46
NBC	18	Sunday 7:30 p.m. ET	1971–1972	September 19, 1971	April 9, 1972	#19	13.66
NBC	19	Sunday 7:30 p.m. ET	1972–1973	September 17, 1972	April 1, 1973	#9	15.23
NBC	20	Sunday 7:30 p.m. ET	1973–1974	September 16, 1973	March 13, 1974	#13	14.76
NBC	21	Sunday 7:30 p.m. ET	1974–1975	September 15, 1974	March 23, 1975	#18	15.07
NBC	22	Sunday 7:00 p.m. ET	1975–1976	September 14, 1975	July 25, 1976		
NBC	23	Sunday 7:00 p.m. ET	1976–1977	September 26, 1976	May 22, 1977		
NBC	24	Sunday 7:00 p.m. ET	1977–1978	September 18, 1977	June 4, 1978	#56	17.3
NBC	25	Sunday 7:00 p.m. ET	1978–1979	September 17, 1978	May 13, 1979	#55	16.9
NBC	26	Sunday 7:00 p.m. ET	1979–1980	September 16, 1979	July 27, 1980		
NBC	27	Sunday 7:00 p.m. ET	1980–1981	September 14, 1980	August 16, 1981		
CBS	28	Saturday 8:00 p.m. ET	1981–1982	September 26, 1981	July 31, 1982		
CBS	29	Saturday 8:00 p.m. ET	1982–1983	September 25, 1982	September 24, 1983		
ABC	30	Sunday 7:00 p.m. ET	1985–1986	February 1, 1986	June 21, 1986		
ABC	31	Sunday 7:00 p.m. ET	1986–1987	September 20, 1986	August 29, 1987		
ABC	32	Sunday 7:00 p.m. ET	1987–1988	October 3, 1987	May 21, 1988		
NBC	33	Sunday 7:00 p.m. ET	1988–1989	October 8, 1988	July 22, 1989		
NBC	34	Sunday 7:00 p.m. ET	1989–1990	September 30, 1989	August 25, 1990		
CBS	35	Various	1990–1991	September 23, 1990	September 15, 1991		
CBS	36	Various	1991–1992	September 22, 1991	September 13, 1992		
CBS	37	Various	1992–1993	September 20, 1992	September 12, 1993		
CBS	38	Various	1993–1994	September 19, 1993	September 11, 1994		
CBS	39	Various	1994–1995	September 18, 1994	September 10, 1995		
CBS	40	Various	1995–1996	September 17, 1995	August 25, 1996		
CBS	41	Various	1996–1997	September 8, 1996	December 1, 1996		
ABC	42	Sunday 7:00 p.m.ET	1997–1998	September 28, 1997	May 18, 1998	#30	13.50
ABC	43	Sunday 7:00 p.m.ET	1998–1999	September 27, 1998	May 30, 1999	#45	11.90
ABC	44	Sunday 7:00 p.m.ET	1999–2000	September 26, 1999	May 14, 2000	#29	12.82
ABC	45	Sunday 7:00 p.m.ET	2000–2001	October 8, 2000	May 27, 2001	#39	12.10
ABC	46	Sunday 7:00 p.m.ET	2001–2002	September 16, 2001	May 19, 2002	#38	11.20
ABC	47	Sunday 7:00 p.m.ET	2002–2003	November 3, 2002	July 27, 2003	#53	10.10
ABC	48	Saturday 8:00 p.m. ET	2003–2004	September 27, 2003	May 8, 2004	#99	7.39
ABC	49	Saturday 8:00 p.m. ET	2004–2005	October 16, 2004	June 18, 2005	#96	6.93
ABC	50	Saturday 8:00 p.m. ET	2005–2006	November 5, 2005	July 8, 2006	#137	5.30
ABC	51	Saturday 8:00 p.m. ET	2006–2007	December 16, 2006	August 4, 2007	#208	4.28
ABC	52	Saturday 8:00 p.m. ET	2007–2008	December 22, 2007	December 20, 2008	#172	4.01

== Awards and nominations ==
=== Emmy Awards ===
==== Won ====
1. Best Individual Program of the Year (Operation Undersea, 1955)
2. Best Television Film Editing (Lynn Harrison, Grant K. Smith, Operation Undersea, 1955)
3. Best Action or Adventure Series (1956)
4. Best Producer – Film Series (Walt Disney, 1956)
5. Outstanding Program Achievement in the Field of Children's Programming (1963)
6. Outstanding Program Achievements in Entertainment (Walt Disney, 1965)
7. Special Classification of Outstanding Program and Individual Achievement – Programs (Ron Miller, executive producer, 1971)
8. Outstanding Main Title Design (1998)

==== Nominated ====
1. Best Television Film Editing (Chester W. Schaeffer, "Davy Crockett: Indian Fighter", 1955)
2. Best Single Program of the Year ("Davy Crockett and River Pirates", 1956)
3. Best Musical Contribution for Television (Oliver Wallace, 1957)
4. Outstanding Program Achievement in the Field of Children's Programming (1962)
5. Outstanding Program Achievements in the Fields of Variety and Music – Variety (1962)
6. Outstanding Children's Program (Walt Disney, Ron Miller, Further Adventures of Gallagher, 1966)
7. Outstanding Achievement in Children's Programming – Programs (Ron Miller, executive producer, 1969)
8. Outstanding Achievement in Children's Programming – Programs (Ron Miller, executive producer, 1970)
9. Special Classification of Outstanding Program and Individual Achievement – General Programming (Ron Miller, producer, 1972)
10. Special Classification of Outstanding Program Achievement (Ron Miller, executive producer, 1977)
11. Outstanding Children's Program (The Art of Disney Animation, 1981)

== Home media ==
Several home media releases have included episodes of the anthology series.

- On Vacation with Mickey Mouse and Friends
- Kids Is Kids
- The Adventures of Chip 'N' Dale
- At Home with Donald Duck
- Disney's Halloween Treat
- A Disney Christmas Gift
- Winnie the Pooh and Friends
- Bambi Platinum Edition
  - Tricks of Our Trade (excerpt)
- Alice in Wonderland Masterpiece Edition
  - One Hour in Wonderland (complete episode)
  - Operation Wonderland Featurette
  - The Fred Waring Show (first half)
  - 1954 Introduction
  - 1964 Introduction
- Alice in Wonderland Special Un-Anniversary Edition
  - One Hour in Wonderland (complete episode)
  - Operation Wonderland Featurette
  - The Fred Waring Show (first half)
  - 1954 Introduction
  - 1964 Introduction
- Alice in Wonderland 60th Anniversary Edition
  - One Hour in Wonderland (complete episode)
  - Operation Wonderland Featurette
  - The Fred Waring Show (first half)
  - 1954 Introduction
  - 1959 Introduction
  - 1964 Introduction
- Peter Pan Special Edition
  - The Peter Pan Story Featurette
- Peter Pan Platinum Edition
  - The Peter Pan Story Featurette
- Dumbo 60th Anniversary Edition
  - Walt Disney Introduction
- Dumbo Big Top Edition
  - Walt Disney Introduction
- Snow White and the Seven Dwarfs Platinum Edition
  - Tricks of Our Trade (two excerpts)
  - The Silly Symphony Story (excerpt)
- Pete's Dragon Gold Collection/High Flying Edition
  - The Plausible Impossible (excerpt)
- The Aristocats Special Edition
  - The Great Cat Family
- Disneyland, USA
  - The Disneyland Story
  - Disneyland After Dark
  - Disneyland 10th Anniversary
- Behind the Scenes at the Walt Disney Studios
  - The Story of the Animated Drawing
  - The Plausible Impossible
  - Tricks of Our Trade
- Tomorrow Land
  - Man in Space
  - Man and the Moon
  - Mars and Beyond
  - Our Friend the Atom
- The Complete Pluto, Volume 1
  - A Story of Dogs (featuring excerpt from "Pluto's Picture Book")
- The Chronological Donald, Volume Two
  - A Day in the Life of Donald Duck
- Your Host, Walt Disney
  - I Captured the King of the Leprechauns
  - Backstage Party
  - Where Do the Stories Come From
  - The Fourth Anniversary Show
  - Disneyland 10th Anniversary
- True Life Adventures (4 volumes)
- Disneyland: Secrets, Stories and Magic
  - The Golden Horseshoe Revue
  - Disneyland Goes To the World's Fair
  - Disneyland Around the Seasons
- So Dear to My Heart
  - So Dear to My Heart (introduction)
- 20,000 Leagues Under the Sea
  - Monsters of the Deep (excerpt)
- Lady and the Tramp Platinum Edition
  - A Story of Dogs ("making-of" segment and excerpt)
  - A Cavalcade of Songs (3-minute-long excerpt)
- Old Yeller
  - Best Doggone Dog in the West
- Darby O'Gill and the Little People
  - I Captured The King of the Leprechauns
- Johnny Tremain
  - The Liberty Story (first half)
  - Johnny Tremain, Part One (excerpt)
  - Johnny Tremain, Part Two (excerpt)
- Sleeping Beauty Special Edition
  - An Adventure in Art (segment: "Four Artists Paint One Tree")
  - The Peter Tchaikovsky Story (Life of Tchaikovsky segment only)
- Sleeping Beauty Platinum Edition
  - An Adventure in Art (segment: "4 Artists Paint 1 Tree")
  - The Peter Tchaikovsky Story (complete episode – two versions)
- Pollyanna
  - Pollyanna, Part One (introduction)
  - Pollyanna, Part Two (introduction)
  - Pollyanna, Part Three (introduction)
- Swiss Family Robinson
  - Escape to Paradise/Water Birds (first half)
- The Parent Trap
  - The Title Makers (first half)
- The Sword in the Stone Gold Collection
  - All About Magic (complete episode)
- The Sword in the Stone 45th Anniversary Edition
  - All About Magic (excerpt)
- A Goofy Movie Gold Collection
  - The Goofy Success Story (complete episode without the Disneyland intro)
- Pirates of the Caribbean: The Curse of the Black Pearl
  - From the Pirates of the Caribbean to the World of Tomorrow (first half)

In the 1980s, Walt Disney Home Video released 15 volumes of the anthology series on VHS, while many episodes have been released on DVD from either the Disney Movie Club or the Disney Generations movies-on-demand (MOD) program on Amazon.com.

== See also ==
- Zorro (1957 TV series)
- Disneyland
- The Mickey Mouse Club
- Disney Channel
- List of Disney television films
- Hallmark Hall of Fame
- World Masterpiece Theater
