= Disneyland, Inc. =

Defunct corporation

Disneyland, Incorporated
- Type: Joint venture
- Industry: Amusement
- Founded: 1951; 75 years ago
- Founder: Walt Disney
- Defunct: 1982; 44 years ago
- Fate: Acquired by Walt Disney World Company
- Products: Disneyland
- Services: Amusement park
- Owners: American Broadcasting-Paramount Theatres (34.48%); Walt Disney Productions (34.48%); Walt Disney (16.55%); Western Publishing (13.8%)

Disneyland, Inc. (DLI) was a corporation formed to finance, build and run Disneyland park in Anaheim, California.

== History ==
=== Start up ===
Disneyland, Inc. was incorporated in the State of California in 1951 by Walt Disney. A companion company owned only by Walt Disney originally called Walt Disney, Incorporated then WED Enterprises (WED) was set up in 1952 supposedly only for television production, but was used to design Disneyland and its attractions. As the board of directors of Walt Disney Productions (WDP) was questionable in its support for the project. In March 1953, WDP board of directors agreed to Walt Disney's personal services contract and WED's contracts for designing and building Disneyland park attractions for cost plus overhead with three board directors resigning.

The Stanford Research Institute was hired in April 1953 to determine the best park location and an amusement parks and public attractions analysis for US$32,000 (Note: Building a Company - Roy O. Disney and the Creation of an Entertainment Empire, by Bob Thomas, 1998. Page 186.; The Disney Studio Story, by Richard Holliss and Brian Sibley, 1988.; Walt Disney - An American Original, by Bob Thomas, 1994. Page 249.; Building a Dream - The Art of Disney Architecture, by Beth Dunlop, 1996. Page 28.) while WED started designing Disneyland with Bill Martin signing on to do so. (Note: Building a Company - Roy O. Disney and the Creation of an Entertainment Empire, by Bob Thomas, 1998. Page 181.) By July, Disney directed the institute to look at 100+ acre Southern California location. (Note: Disney - The First 100 Years, updated edition, by Dave Smith and Steven Clark, 2002. Page 74.: Walt Disney - The Triumph of the American Imagination, by Neal Gabler, 2006. Page 500.) Also that month, one of the Disney brothers had an initial meeting with American Broadcasting-Paramount Theatres's Leonard H. Goldenson about Disneyland financing for Disney Production film inventory. (Note: Walt Disney - Hollywood's Dark Prince, by Marc Eliot, 1993. Page 216.: Walt Disney - An American Original, by Bob Thomas, 1994. Page 249.)

Roy met in August 1953 with the Stanford Research Institute over the Disneyland location survey's 10 possible location settling on an area along the Santa Ana Freeway in Anaheim. Soon, a 160-acre grove of orange trees, the Ball Road subdivision, was purchased for US$879 thousand. (Note: Disney - The First 100 Years, updated edition, by Dave Smith and Steven Clark, 2002. Page 74.) An additional 270 acres were purchased for the site by a real estate agent, (Note: Building a Company - Roy O. Disney and the Creation of an Entertainment Empire, by Bob Thomas, 1998. Page 187.) followed by a separate purchase of 244 more acres. (Note: Disney Discourse - Producing the Magic Kingdom, by Eric Smoodin, 1994. Page 61.)

The first park diagram plan was completed by Marvin Davis on August 8, 1953 with Walt adding the triangular space bounding the park for the railroad. (Note: Walt Disney's Railroad Story, by Michael Broggie, 1997. Pages 200.) On September 25, Davis finished his second version design with the hub layout. On the following day Walt and Herb Ryman started a 42-hour period in which they drew a 43x70 inch detailed aerial view. (Note: Walt Disney Imagineering - A Behind the Dreams Look at Making the Magic Real, by The Imagineers, 1996. Page 15.) During the year, Key Disney staff members toured major American amusement parks to find out what does not work. (Note: Disneyland - The First 35 Years, by Walt Disney Company, 1989.)

With the WED concept designs and prospectus for Disneyland, Roy Disney in September 1953 met with TV networks CBS and NBC in a deal for Disney-produced TV show and Disneyland investment. Both showed interest in the TV shows but not for the Disneyland investment. Roy then approached American Broadcasting-Paramount Theatres's Goldenson, who had pursued Disney for programming before, who agreed to the Disneyland, Inc. investment as the risk to make ABC a major network. Just a week after Disney set a record for receiving 4 Oscars on March 29, 1954, the ABC-Paramount board approved the Disney deal. Despite some WDP board resistance, WDP board approve the agreement which was signed on April 2.

American Broadcasting-Paramount Theatres (AB-PT) agreed to invest $500,000 in Disneyland, Inc. taking a 34.49 percent and guaranteeing $4.5 million in bank loan plus a weekly TV programming for ABC from Walt Disney Productions. Joining AB-PT as Disneyland investors were Walt Disney Productions, Western Publishing and Walt Disney. The other shares were 34.48% by Walt Disney Productions (US$500,000 investment), 13.8% by Western Printing and Lithography Co (US$200,000 investment), 16.55% by Walt Disney (US$250,000 investment). Walt Disney Productions had the option to repurchase the Walt Disney, WED and Western Publishing shares (31%) by May 1, 1959 for $562,500. WED held ownership of the Disneyland Railroad.

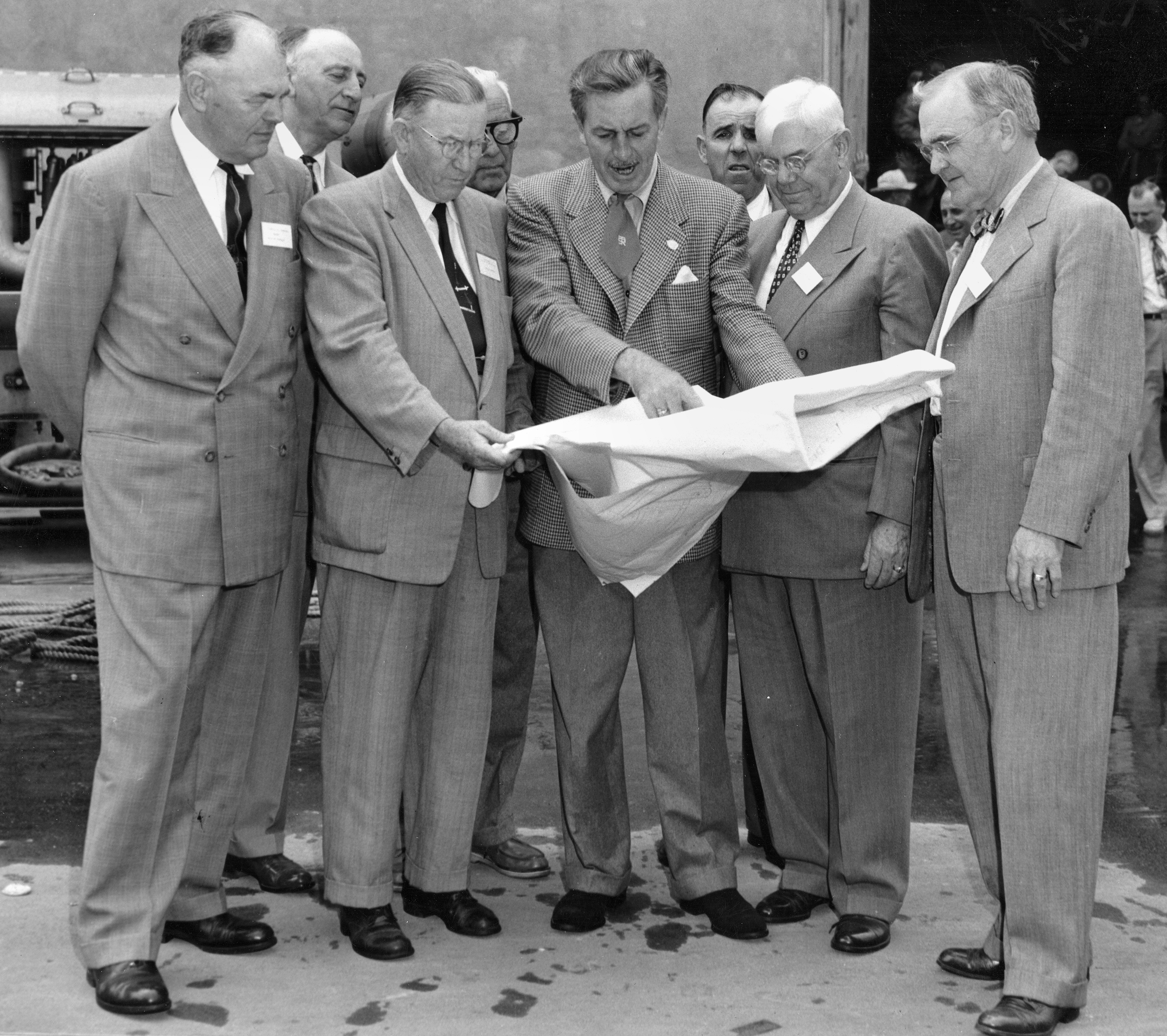
Walt Disney (center) showing Orange County officials plans for Disneyland's layout, December 1954. Photo courtesy Orange County Archives.

Disneyland was announced in April 1954 by Walt, and it was to be opened in July 1955. (Note: Walt Disney, by Jim Fanning, 1994. Page 100.) (Note: Walt Disney - Hollywood's Dark Prince, by Marc Eliot, 1993. Page 223.)

With a need for a hotel nearby and no funding available for Disney to build it, Walt Disney approached Hilton and Sheraton Hotels about building such a hotel. Both turned down Disney as they had no idea where Anaheim was. Disney began approach prospective investors for the Disneyland Hotel in 1954 which included Jack Wrather who agreed. Wrather-Alvarez Hotels, Inc. was expected to have the hotel opened in November 1955.

AB-PT's subsidiary, UPT Concessions, Inc. was enlisted to operate Tomorrowland's Space Bar (original name Stratosnak) and various other concession stands in Disneyland. On March 29, 1955, the Atchison, Topeka & Santa Fe Railway was one of many companies that sponsored attractions in the park with its 5-year sponsorship of all Disneyland trains and stations at the park's opening agreed. (Note: Walt Disney's Railroad Story, by Michael Broggie, 1997. Page 273.)

Rear Admiral Joseph W. Fowler was hired in April 1954 as senior vice president for engineering and construction to oversee building Disneyland. (Note: Disney - The First 100 Years, updated edition, by Dave Smith and Steven Clark, 2002. Page 75.) Work began on the site in July with the removal of the first orange tree. (Note: Disney's World, by Leonard Mosley, 1985. Page 233.) A 1955 strike by the Orange County plumbers and asphalt workers puts the Disneyland building schedule in jeopardy. (Note: Walt Disney - Hollywood's Dark Prince, by Marc Eliot, 1993. Page 227.)

=== Operational ===
On July 17, 1955 at 2 PM, the Disneyland park with Five themed "lands" containing eighteen attractions opened. 15 thousand guests were invited to the opening event, but it is believed that 28 to 33 thousand came to the park. The total construction cost came to $17 million. (Note: Walt Disney, by Jim Fanning, 1994. Page 102.)

By 1955, WDP had advanced DLI $2.4 million. WDI also took out its AB-PT guaranteed bank loan for $4.4 million in installment payments with the final payment in April 1962. The loan is secured by Disneyland real and certain personal properties, leasehold and the TV programming contract revenue which if Disneyland defaults AB-PT may purchase the loan. On June 29, 1957, Disney Production exercised its options to purchase all but AB-PT's common stock outstanding. This allowed WDP to consolidate DLI into its 1957 annual accounting statements adding four months worth of net profits, $511K.

By 1958, Walt Disney Productions reported a profit of $2.9 million, primarily attributable to its by then 65% interest in Disneyland, Inc. Additionally, Walt Disney Productions stock (which moved the year prior to the New York Stock Exchange) had grown to around $60 per share thanks to the growing realization by the financial markets of the profitability of the park.

On June 14, 1959, the WED owned Disneyland-Alweg Monorail System is installed in Tomorrowland. (Note: Disneyland: Inside Story, by Randy Bright, 1987.; Thomas, Bob. Walt Disney - An American Original. Page 281. (1994).; Screen World 1992, Volume 43, by John Willis, 1993. Page 84.; Building a Company - Roy O. Disney and the Creation of an Entertainment Empire, by Bob Thomas, 1998. Page 254.; The Disneyland Encyclopedia, by Chris Strodder, 2008. Page 290.)

In June 1960, Walt Disney Productions completed the purchase of AB-PT's share of the company for nearly $7.5 million and its TV contract, and the theme park became a fully owned part of Walt Disney Productions. April 25, 1961 Walt Disney Productions and Disneyland, Inc. was able to pay off all existing loans.

Finally, in 1982, the Disney family sold the naming rights and rail-based attractions, owned then by Retlaw Enterprise (formerly WED), to the Disney film studio for 818,461 shares of Disney stock then worth $42.6 million to the Disney family.

== ABC deal programs ==
The investment contract for Disneyland with American Broadcasting-Paramount Theatres included programming for ABC TV, which paid $5 million per year during 7-year contract and is the largest TV package deal in history. (Note: Walt Disney - Pop Culture Legends, by Jim Fanning, 1994. Page 100.)

- Walt Disney's Magic Kingdom, radio program for ABC Radio
- Disneyland anthology television series launched on 7:30 to 8:30 Wednesday October 27, 1954 with the episode, The Disneyland Story. The Jungle Cruise attraction is featured with a model is used on a bare earth rout. Disneyland itself would be featured in additional episodes:
  - A Progress Report (February 9, 1955)
  - Further Report on Disneyland (March 13, 1955) (Note: The Disney Films, by Leonard Maltin, 1995. Page 357.)
  - A Further Report on Disneyland / A Tribute to Mickey Mouse (July 13, 1955)
  - Disneyland the Park / Pecos Bill (April 3, 1957)
- Dateline: Disneyland (July 17, 1955) opening day special
- Disneyland '59 (June 15, 1959) live 90-minute TV special featuring an enlarged Autopia plus new attractions: Submarine Voyage, Matterhorn Bobsleds, Monorail and Motor Boat Cruise. (Note: Disney A to Z - The Official Encyclopedia, by Dave Smith, 1996. Pages 22, 117, 135, 138, 200.)
