= United Paramount =

United Paramount may refer to:

- United Paramount Network
- United Paramount Theatres, Inc. later American Broadcasting-Paramount Theatres, American Broadcasting Companies, Inc. then ABC Television, Inc.
