= The Story of the Animated Drawing =

- Walt Disney's Disneyland episode
- Episode no.: Season 2 Episode 11
- Original air date: November 30, 1955

"The Story of the Animated Drawing" is an episode of the Walt Disney's Disneyland television program originally broadcast on November 30, 1955.

Walt Disney explains the history of animation throughout the ages, starting back in prehistoric days and working its way up to some primitive mechanical animation contraptions in the 19th century.

The reenactments in Chapter 1 of the historical devices preceding actual films are taken from the 1946 film, "The Animated Film: The Toy that Grew Up." From there, it goes on to more advanced animation methods, as evidenced in J. Stuart Blackton's Humorous Phases of Funny Faces, Winsor McCay's Gertie the Dinosaur, J.R. Bray's Colonel Heeza Liar and Raoul Barré's Animated Grouch Chasers. This is also evidenced in such famed cartoonists as J. R. Bray, Earl Hurd and Pat Sullivan (who is famous for his creation of Felix the Cat). Then it shows a demonstration of how music was synchronized into cartoons in the early days of the cinema.

Then it begins to focus more on Walt Disney's contributions to animation, in sound (Steamboat Willie), in music being the main element (the Silly Symphonies series and Fantasia) and in animated feature films (Snow White and the Seven Dwarfs, and Pinocchio). The Nutcracker Suite segment from Fantasia is presented virtually complete.
