= Isabelle Goldenson =

Isabelle Charlotte Weinstein Goldenson (May 18, 1920 - February 21, 2005) was the wife of American Broadcasting Company founder and chairman Leonard Goldenson, and a co-founder of the charity United Cerebral Palsy (UCP).

The Goldensons' daughter Genise was born in 1943 with cerebral palsy. Five years later, the Goldensons joined with New York City businessman Jack Hausman and his wife, Ethel, to found UCP. Isabelle Goldenson went on to found the UCP Research Foundation, which studies the condition and its cure. The UCP Research Foundation has been credited with discovering the vaccine against Rubella, phototherapy and the fetal heart monitor.

The Goldensons lobbied the United States Congress for legislation to assist disabled people. This eventually led to the passage of the Americans with Disabilities Act. Shortly after the first Moon landing, the Goldensons met with scientists and engineers from NASA, the National Institute of Health and the Veterans Administration in order to study how technology used in space exploration could be used to assist disabled people.
