= Leonard Goldenson =

American businessman

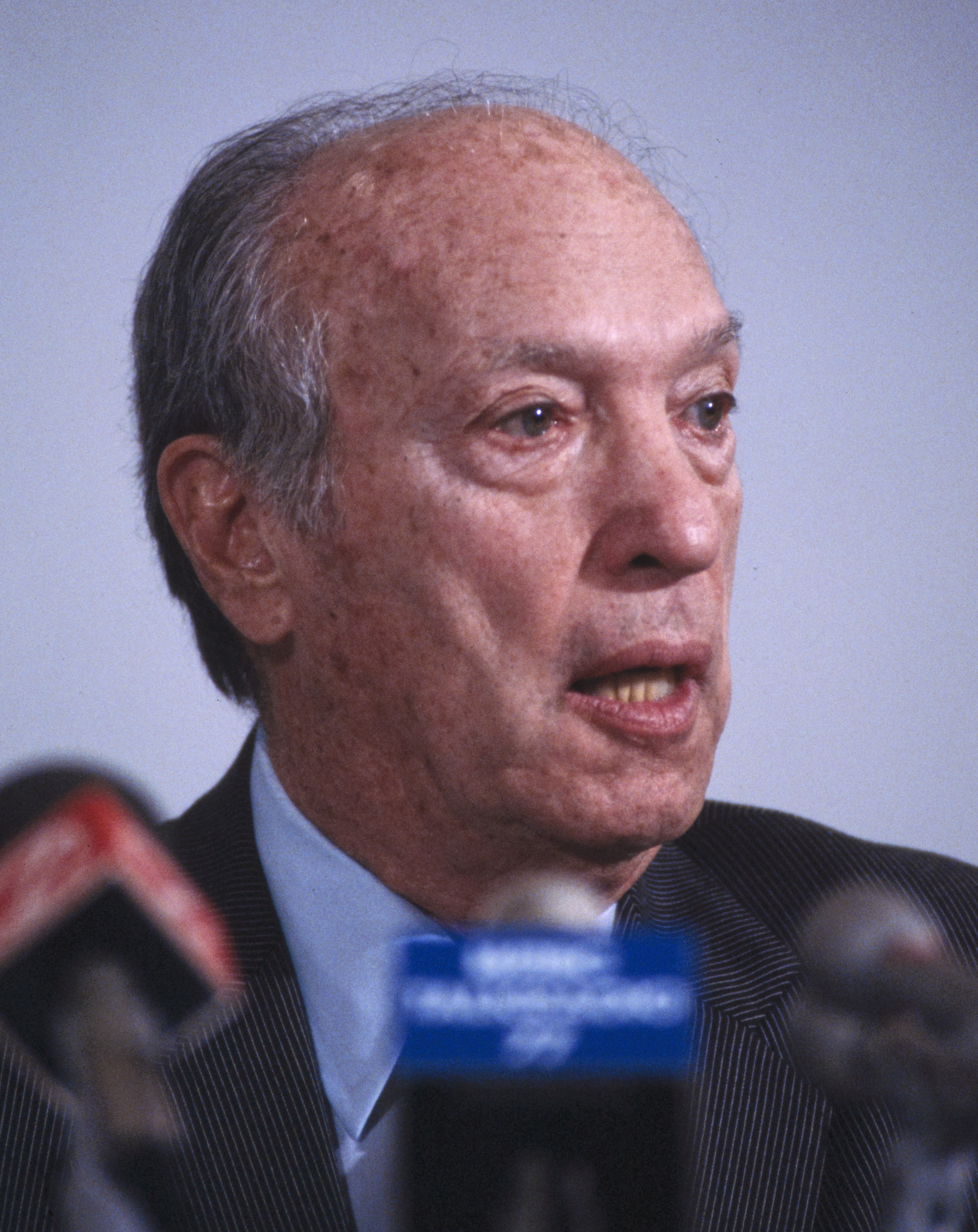
- Goldenson in 1985
- Born: Leonard H. Goldenson; December 7, 1905; Pennsylvania, U.S.
- Died: December 27, 1999 (aged 94); Sarasota, Florida, U.S.
- Education: B.A. Harvard University; J.D. Harvard Law School
- Known for: CEO of United Paramount Theatres, President of American Broadcasting Company
- Spouse: Isabelle Charlotte Weinstein
- Children: 3

Leonard H. Goldenson (December 7, 1905 – December 27, 1999) was the founder and president of the United States–based television network American Broadcasting Company (ABC), from 1953 to 1986. Goldenson, as CEO of United Paramount Theatres, acquired a then-struggling ABC from candy industrialist Edward J. Noble. Goldenson focused on investing heavily on sports and news coverage along with creating synergy between Hollywood studios and television networks. Goldenson turned ABC into a media conglomerate, owning television and radio stations along with newspapers and book publishers.

His innovations with ABC in terms of programming and media synergy would have lasting implications on the American television industry, and be emulated by leadership of other networks. He was portrayed by Eli Wallach in the 2002 TNT movie Monday Night Mayhem.

== Early life and career ==
Goldenson was born in Pennsylvania, on December 7, 1905, to a Jewish family in Pennsylvania in 1905. He grew up in the town of Scottdale, Pennsylvania, and graduated from Scottdale High School. He was educated at Harvard, and entered the entertainment industry in 1933 as an attorney for Paramount Pictures after graduating from Harvard Law School.

== Career ==
Goldenson was hired to help reorganize United Paramount Theatres, Paramount's theater chain, which at the time was nearing bankruptcy. So skillful was his work at this assignment that Paramount's chief executive officer, Barney Balaban, hired Goldenson as deputy to the manager of the Paramount Theaters chain. United Paramount Theatres was spun off in the wake of United States v. Paramount Pictures, Inc., a 1948 decree of the U.S. Supreme Court, and Goldenson became president of the new company.

Goldenson orchestrated the merger of United Paramount Theatres with ABC in 1953. ABC was originally formed in 1943 in the wake of an earlier Supreme Court decree effectively ordering the spinoff of the largely secondary-status Blue Network from its then-parent, NBC; its buyer, industrialist Edward J. Noble, tried to build ABC into a competitive broadcasting company, but by 1951 was rumored to be on the verge of selling the nearly bankrupt operation to CBS, whose management apparently wanted ABC's critically important owned-and-operated television stations.

Goldenson rescued ABC by convincing his board of directors to buy the company from Noble for $25 million. becoming the founding president of the merged company which was named American Broadcasting-Paramount Theatres. The modern ABC dates its history from the effective date of the Goldenson transaction, and not the Blue Network spinoff.

Although he focused chiefly on ABC Television, Goldenson oversaw all areas of ABC-Paramount's entertainment/media operations for over thirty years, from 1951 to 1986, including the creation of the AmPar Record Corporation in 1955 and the 'rebadging' of the ABC-Paramount group as the American Broadcasting Company in 1968. Goldenson also was instrumental in the sale of ABC to Capital Cities Communications in 1986, which at the time, was the largest non-oil merger in history. Very early on in his tenure, Goldenson also hired the first African-American staff announcer in network television and radio history, Sid McCoy.

== Personal life ==
His wife was Isabelle Charlotte Weinstein, whom he married in October 1939, and was co-founder of United Cerebral Palsy. Goldenson, whose first-born daughter Cookie was born with cerebral palsy, co-founded United Cerebral Palsy in 1949 and used station WBKB (at the time owned by United Paramount Theatres) to be the flagship station for the inaugural UCP telethon that year.

In 1974, Goldenson received The Hundred Year Association of New York's Gold Medal Award "in recognition of outstanding contributions to the City of New York." The Leonard H. Goldenson Theater at the Academy of Television Arts & Sciences building in North Hollywood, California, is named in his honor. Goldenson was inducted into the Television Hall of Fame in 1987.

Goldenson was known for always flying economy class and never driving a new car.

== Death ==
He died on December 27, 1999, at the age of 94. He was survived by his wife and his two daughters: Loreen Goldenson Arbus and Maxine Goldenson. His daughter, Loreen Arbus, was the first woman to head programming at a major television network at Showtime Networks.
