= American Broadcasting-Paramount Theatres =

Broadcasting and movie theater company

American Broadcasting Companies, Inc.

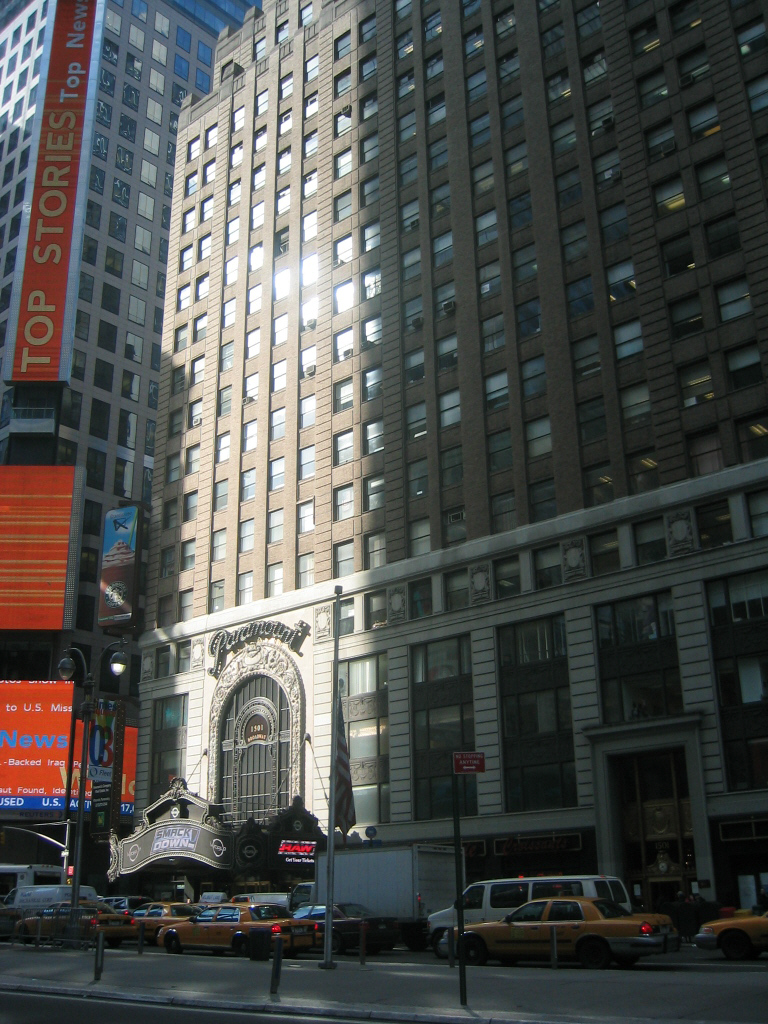
- American Broadcasting-Paramount Theatres former headquarters located in 1501 Broadway.
- Formerly: United Paramount Theatres; (1949–1953); American Broadcasting-Paramount Theatres; (1953–1965)
- Type: Public
- Traded as: NYSE: ABC
- Industry: Movie theater, radio broadcasting, television broadcasting, publishing, recording
- Predecessor: United Paramount Theatres; American Broadcasting Company
- Founded: November 15, 1949; 76 years ago
- Founder: Paramount Pictures
- Defunct: March 18, 1985; 41 years ago
- Fate: Merged with Capital Cities Communications
- Successors: Capital Cities/ABC (1985–1996)
- Headquarters: 1501 Broadway, New York City, U.S.
- Area served: Nationwide
- Revenue: ▲US$194.7 million (1955)
- Operating income: ▲US$191.6 million (1955)
- Net income: ▲US$8.2 million (1955)
- Total assets: ▼US$103.9 million (1955)
- Total equity: ▲US$81.4 million (1955)
- Owner: Edward J. Noble (10% common, 55% preferred)
- Divisions: American Broadcasting; ABC Leisure Group; ABC Leisure Group II
- Subsidiaries: ABC Scenic & Wildlife Attractions; ABC Video Enterprises, Inc.; Balaban and Katz Corporation; Paramount Gulf Theatres; Tri-States Theatre Corporation; Alabama Theatres, Inc.; North Carolina Theatres, Inc.; ABC Films Syndication, Inc.; Am-Par Records, Inc.; UPT Concessions, Inc.; Disneyland, Inc. (34%)

American Broadcasting Companies, Inc. (originally United Paramount Theatres, and American Broadcasting-Paramount Theatres, Inc., abbreviated ABPT) was the parent company of the American Broadcasting Company and, until 1978, United Paramount Theatres, formed from a merger of the two companies in 1949. The company was listed on the New York Stock Exchange under the ticker symbol ABC until it was acquired in 1985 by Capital Cities Communications, which then changed its name to Capital Cities/ABC Inc.

== History ==
=== United Paramount Theatres ===
United Paramount Theatres, Inc. (UPT) was incorporated on November 15, 1949, as a spin off of Paramount Pictures' movie theater operations pursuant to the Supreme Court anti-trust ruling in United States v. Paramount Pictures, Inc.. UPT took over Paramount's theater chains, which included Balaban and Katz, a Chicago-based circuit that also included some broadcasting interests. 800 of the 1,450 Paramount theaters were to be divested. A court appointed trustee would control UPT stock for five years to ensure separate ownership of the two businesses. Paramount stockholders were to receive stock in both companies, with a conversion provision that would allow a shareholder to exchange its stock in one successor into the other company's stock. Leonard Goldenson, who had headed the theater chain since 1938, remained as UPT's president. With the American Broadcasting Company (ABC) looking to enter television, UPT had the cash from the divested theaters and was looking to invest that money elsewhere, as it was barred from film making. ABC also considered International Telephone & Telegraph and General Tire, before accepting UPT's offer.

In 1950, UPT acquired a 1/3 share of Microwave Associates, Inc., a consulting and research company for millimeter-wave technology.

=== American Broadcasting-Paramount Theatres ===
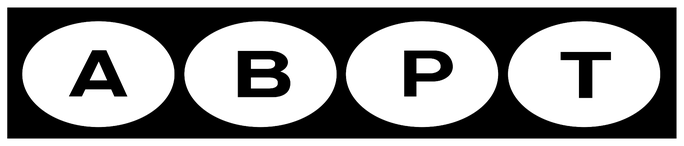
Logo as American Broadcasting-Paramount Theatres

American Broadcasting-Paramount Theatres, Inc. (AB-PT) became the name of United Paramount Theatres, Inc. on February 9, 1953, to reflect its post merger status as the parent company of the merged companies, American Broadcasting Company and United Paramount Theatres. The Federal Communications Commission approved the merger that same day. Leonard H. Goldenson continued as corporate president post merger with ABC president Robert E. Kintner continuing as ABC division president. No general theater division similar to the ABC division was set up as AB-PT corporate would handle overall theater planning and development. ABC division was slated to move out of the RCA Building to 7 W. 66th Street, New York City by April 1. The sale of WBKB (TV) in Chicago to CBS for $6 million was also approved by the FCC.

In 1954, AB-PT made a deal with Walt Disney to provide capital for his proposed Disneyland project in Anaheim, California. For $500,000 in cash and a guarantee of $4.5 million in bank loans, AB-PT acquired a 34.48% interest in Disneyland, Inc. and secured an agreement with Walt Disney Productions to provide programs for the ABC-TV network. AB-PT's subsidiary, UPT Concessions, Inc. was enlisted to operate Tomorrowland's Space Bar (original name Stratosnak) and other concession establishments within Disneyland.

ABC-Paramount formed a records division in 1955, with Samuel H. Clark as its first president. The business was incorporated on June 14, 1955, as Am-Par Record Corporation.

Theater circuit (in 1955)	state(s)
Arizona Paramount	Arizona
Balaban and Katz	Illinois
Florida State	Florida
Great States	Illinois, Indiana, Ohio
Minnesota Amusement	Minnesota, Wisconsin, North & South Dakotas
New England	Massachusetts, Maine, Vermont, New; Hampshire, Connecticut, Rhode Island
Northio	Ohio, Kentucky
Paramount Gulf	Louisiana, Mississippi, Alabama, Florida, Texas
Penn Paramount	Pennsylvania
Tenarken Paramount	Arkansas, Tennessee, Kentucky
Texas Consolidated	Texas
Tri-States	Iowa, Nebraska, Illinois, Missouri
United Detroit	Michigan
Wilby-Kincey	Alabama, Georgia, North & South Carolina, Tennessee, Virginia, West Virginia

In February 1956, along with Western Union, AB-PT agreed to purchase a 22% share of Technical Operations, Inc. a nucleonics, operations research, chemistry and electronics company, with options to increase the share to 25%. In a related transaction, Western Union acquired a 1/3 share in Microwave Associates, allowing that AB-PT holding to purchase a site for a new plant. On December 30, 1956, a film production company, American Broadcasting-Paramount Theatres Pictures was formed, with Irving H. Levin as president.

By March 1957, AB-PT's theater circuits had divested more theaters than required by the court ruling. In June, AB-PT decided to sell 90 more theaters due to declining revenue.

In 1957, Microwave Associates became a publicly traded corporation. On May 1, 1957, the American Broadcasting Company Radio Network was formed as an autonomous subsidiary, with Robert E. Eastman as president.

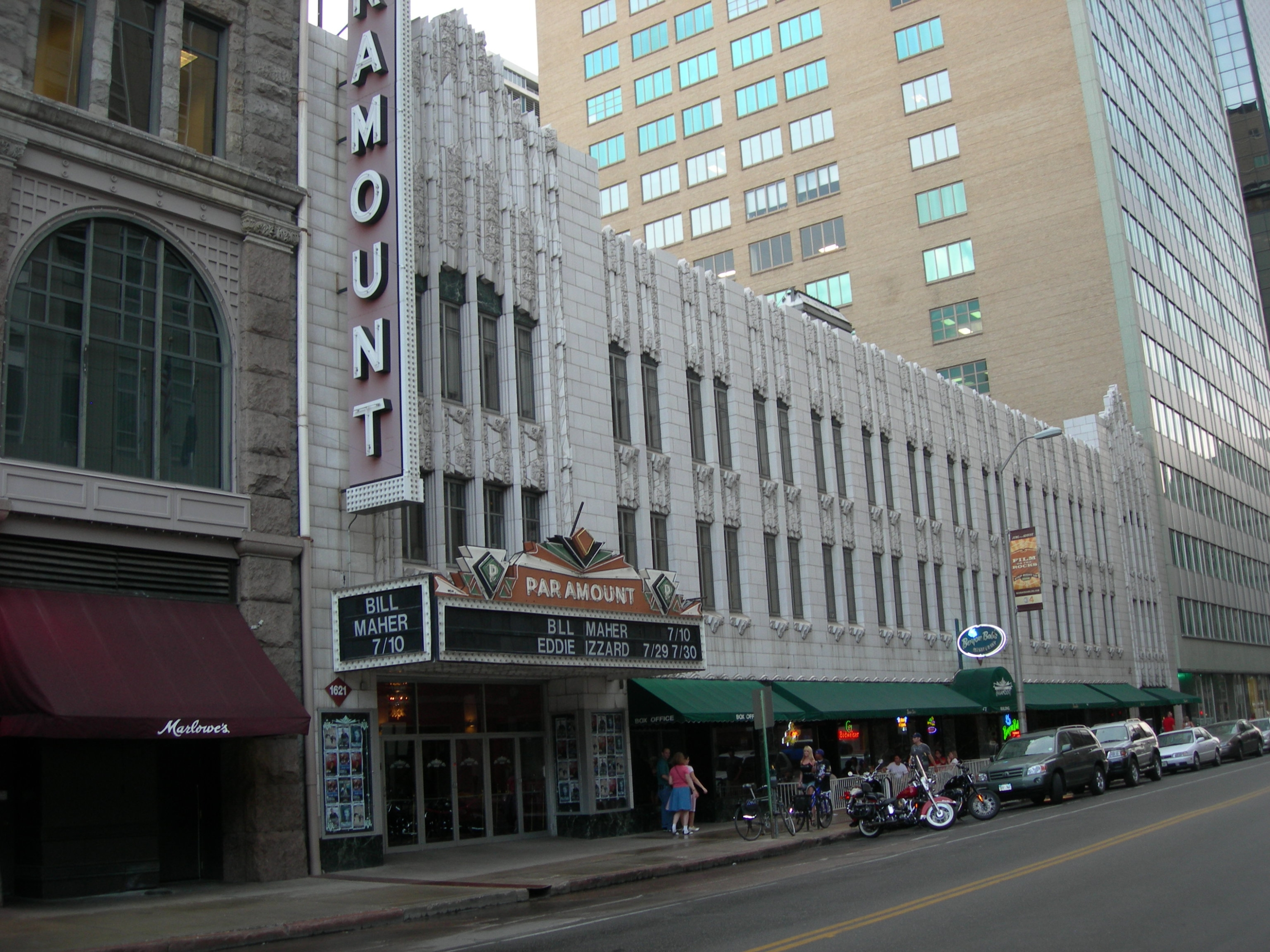
A former Paramount theater in Denver.

AB-PT purchased the Weeki Wachee Springs natural tourist attraction in Florida in 1959. Also in 1959, AB-PT acquired the Prairie Farmer agricultural publishing group, including Chicago radio station WLS (AM), which shared a frequency with AB-PT's station WENR (Chicago). In 1960, Walt Disney Productions paid $7.5 million to buy back AB-PT's share in Disneyland and obtain a release from its ABC-TV contract. In 1962, AB-PT purchased another Florida nature attraction, Silver Springs, and placed it into the company's ABC Scenic & Wildlife Attractions subsidiary.

=== American Broadcasting Companies ===
American Broadcasting-Paramount Theatres, Inc. assumed the name, American Broadcasting Companies, Inc. on July 2, 1965. ABC started ABC Pictures in 1965 to produce feature films. In 1965, Clark was appointed vice-president, non-broadcasting operation of American Broadcasting Companies overseeing ABC-Paramount Records, ABC music publishing, theater operations, ABC Pictures, ABC Amusements and other operations. In April 1966, Dunhill Records was purchased. American Broadcasting Companies move from the New York City Paramount Building to the ABC Building at 1330 Avenue of the Americas, in 1965. Its recording subsidiary was renamed ABC Records in 1966.

On December 7, 1965, Goldenson announced a merger proposal with ITT to ABCs board. The two companies agreed to the deal on April 27, 1966. The FCC approved the merger on December 21, 1966; however the previous day (December 20), Donald F. Turner, head antitrust regulator for the United States Department of Justice, expressed doubts related to such issues as the emerging cable television market, and concerns over the journalistic integrity of ABC and how it could be influenced by the overseas ownership of ITT. ITT management promised that the company would allow ABC to retain autonomy in the publishing business. The merger was suspended, and a complaint was filed by the Department of Justice in July 1967, with ITT going to trial in October 1967; the merger was officially canceled after the trial's conclusion on January 1, 1968.

By May 1972, ABCs formed the ABC Leisure Group consisting of its theaters, farm publishing operations (ABC Farm Publications) and music (ABC Records), Anchor Records and ABC Records and Tape Sales plus a new retail record store division. In January 1973, ABC Leisure Group started ABC Retail Records Division was started head by president Al Franklin. Three Wide World of Music locations in Seattle and Providence were opened by July 1974, when they announced expansion to add 4 more locations. In 1974 by August, ABC Records had acquired two additional record companies. Leisure Group I added ABC Leisure Magazines and ABC Entertainment Center, Center City by October 1974.

Plitt Theatres purchased ABC Theatres northern group of movie theaters including the Balaban & Katz chain in 1974. A second Plitt corporation, Plitt Theatres Holding, purchased ABC's southern circuit in 1978 for $49 million.

ABC Scenic & Wildlife Attractions president John Campbell announced on April 27, 1973, its plans for developing its third wildlife preserve on 280 acres in Prince George's County, Maryland, 12 miles from Washington, DC. On July 15, 1974, The Wildlife Preserve opened in Prince George's County. In October 1974, ABC Leisure Group II was formed by ABC, composed of ABC Theatres (267 locations), ABC Scenic & Wildlife Attractions, Town of Smithville, NJ recreated historic settlement and the Silver Springs Bottled Water Co., under president Walter Schwartz.

ABC Motion Pictures was a theatrical movie subsidiary of ABC, formed in May 1979.

A cable division was started in July 1979 which was incorporated as ABC Video Enterprises, Inc. (AVE) by March 25, 1980. The company also doubled as a home video division of ABC. ABC announced ARTS in December 1980 to be launched on April 5, 1981, sharing Nickelodeon's channel at night. ABC and the Hearst Corporation in January 1981 formed a joint venture, Hearst/ABC Video Services, to provide programming to ARTS and launch BETA, a women's network, later that year. With Group W Satellite Communications, ABC Video Enterprises formed the Satellite News Channel in 1981 only to sell it a year later to Turner Broadcasting, owner of CNN. Cox Cable and AVE formed FirstTicket in 1983, to try the market for pay-per-view sporting events. AVE and ESPN launched Reserve Seat Video Productions, a pay-per-view sports producer, in 1983.

In 1984, ABC Scenic & Wildlife Attractions sold both Florida locations to Florida Leisure Attractions. In 1984, Hearst/ABC-Viacom Entertainment Services (HAVES) was formed from the merger of Daytime (BETA) and Lifetime Medical Television to start and operate a new cable channel, Lifetime Television.

Capital Cities/ABC logo

Capital Cities' announced $3.5 billion purchase of ABC on March 18, 1985, stunned the media industry, as ABC was some four times bigger than Capital Cities was at the time. Berkshire Hathaway chairman Warren Buffett helped to finance the deal in exchange for a 25 percent share in the combined company.

In October 1985, ABC Motion Pictures was shut down.

== Bibliography ==
- Goldenson, Leonard H.; Wolf, Marvin J. (1991–1993). Beating the Odds: The Untold Story Behind the Rise of ABC. New York City: Charles Scribner's Sons. ISBN 0-684-19055-9.
- Legrand, Jacques (1992). Lherminier, Pierre (ed.). Chronique du cinéma [Chronicles of the Cinema] (in French). Éditions Chronique. ISBN 9782905969552.
- Polsson, Ken. Chronology of Disneyland Theme Park.
