= List of rail transit systems in the United States =

This is a list of the operating passenger rail transit systems in the United States. This list does not include intercity rail services such as the Alaska Railroad, Brightline, or Amtrak and its state-sponsored subsidiaries. "Region" refers to the metropolitan area based around the city listed, where applicable.

== Operating ==
Region	State	System	Authority	Type (FTA)
Albuquerque	New Mexico	Rail Runner Express	Rio Metro	Commuter rail
Atlanta	Georgia	MARTA rail	MARTA	Heavy rail
Atlanta	Georgia	Atlanta Streetcar	MARTA	Streetcar
Austin	Texas	CapMetro Rail	CapMetro	Commuter rail
Baltimore	Maryland	Metro SubwayLink	Maryland Transit Administration	Heavy rail
Baltimore	Maryland	Light RailLink	Maryland Transit Administration	Light rail
Bay Lake	Florida	Walt Disney World Monorail	Disney Transport	Monorail
Boston area	Massachusetts, Rhode Island	MBTA Commuter Rail	MBTA	Commuter rail
Boston	Massachusetts	MBTA subway (and)	MBTA	Heavy rail
Boston	Massachusetts	MBTA subway	MBTA	Light rail
Boston	Massachusetts	MBTA subway	MBTA	Heritage light rail
Buffalo	New York	Metro Rail	NFTA	Light rail
Camden and Trenton	New Jersey	River Line	NJ Transit	Tram-train
Charlotte	North Carolina	Lynx Blue Line	CATS	Light rail
Charlotte	North Carolina	CityLynx Gold Line	CATS	Streetcar
Chicago	Illinois, Indiana	South Shore Line	NICTD	Commuter rail
Chicago	Illinois	The "L"	Chicago Transit Authority	Heavy rail
Chicago	Illinois	Airport Transit System	Chicago Airport Authority	VAL
Chicago	Illinois, Wisconsin	Metra	Northeast Illinois RCRC	Commuter rail
Cincinnati	Ohio	Connector	SORTA (operation contracted to Transdev)	Streetcar
Cleveland	Ohio	RTA Rapid Transit	GCRTA	Heavy rail
Cleveland	Ohio	RTA Rapid Transit	GCRTA	Light rail
Dallas–Fort Worth	Texas	Trinity Railway Express	Dallas Area Rapid Transit	Commuter rail
Dallas–Fort Worth	Texas	Trinity Railway Express	Trinity Metro	Commuter rail
Dallas–Fort Worth	Texas	DART rail (and)	Dallas Area Rapid Transit	Light rail
Dallas–Fort Worth	Texas	DART rail	Dallas Area Rapid Transit	Commuter rail
Dallas–Fort Worth	Texas	Dallas Streetcar	City of Dallas (operated by DART)	Streetcar
Dallas–Fort Worth	Texas	M-Line Trolley	McKinney Avenue Transit Authority	Heritage streetcar
Dallas–Fort Worth	Texas	Skylink	DFW Airport	People mover
Dallas–Fort Worth	Texas	A-train	DCTA	Commuter rail
Dallas–Fort Worth	Texas	TEXRail	Trinity Metro	Commuter rail
Denver	Colorado	RTD Rail	Regional Transportation District	Commuter rail
Denver	Colorado	RTD Rail	Regional Transportation District	Light rail
Detroit	Michigan	QLine	M-1 Rail	Streetcar
Detroit	Michigan	Detroit People Mover	Detroit Transportation Corporation	Automated people mover
El Paso	Texas	El Paso Streetcar	Sun Metro	Heritage streetcar
Galveston	Texas	Galveston Island Trolley	Island Transit	Heritage streetcar
Hartford	Connecticut	Hartford Line	CTDOT	Commuter rail
Honolulu	Hawaii	Skyline	Honolulu DTS	Light metro
Houston	Texas	METRORail	METRO	Light rail
Jersey City/Hudson County	New Jersey	Hudson–Bergen Light Rail	NJ Transit	Light rail
Kansas City	Missouri	KC Streetcar	Kansas City Streetcar Authority (operated by Herzog Transit Services)	Streetcar
Kenosha	Wisconsin	Kenosha Streetcars	Kenosha Transit	Heritage streetcar
Las Vegas	Nevada	Las Vegas Monorail	Las Vegas Monorail Company	Monorail
Little Rock	Arkansas	Metro Streetcar	Rock Region Metro	Heritage streetcar
Los Angeles	California	Metro Rail ( and)	Los Angeles Metro	Heavy rail
Los Angeles	California	Metro Rail (and)	Los Angeles Metro	Light rail
Los Angeles	California	Metrolink	SCRRA	Commuter rail
Memphis	Tennessee	MATA Trolley	MATA	Heritage streetcar
Miami	Florida	Tri-Rail	SFRTA	Commuter rail
Miami	Florida	Metrorail	Miami-Dade Transit	Heavy rail
Miami	Florida	Metromover	Miami-Dade Transit	Automated guideway transit
Milwaukee	Wisconsin	The Hop	City of Milwaukee (operated by Transdev)	Streetcar
Minneapolis–Saint Paul	Minnesota	Metro	Metro Transit	Light rail
Morgantown	West Virginia	Morgantown PRT	West Virginia University	People mover
Nashville	Tennessee	WeGo Star	TRTA	Commuter rail
New Haven	Connecticut	Shore Line East	CTDOT	Commuter rail
New Orleans	Louisiana	New Orleans Streetcars	New Orleans RTA	Heritage streetcar
New York	New York	Long Island Rail Road	MTA	Commuter rail
New York	New York, Connecticut	Metro-North Railroad	MTA	Commuter rail
New York	New York	New York City Subway	MTA	Heavy rail
New York	New York	Staten Island Railway	MTA	Heavy rail
New York	New York, New Jersey	PATH	PANYNJ	Heavy rail
New York	New York	AirTrain JFK	PANYNJ	Automated light rail
New York	New York, New Jersey, Pennsylvania	NJ Transit Rail Operations	NJ Transit	Commuter rail
Newark	New Jersey	Newark Light Rail	NJ Transit	Light rail
Newark	New Jersey	AirTrain Newark	PANYNJ	Monorail
Norfolk	Virginia	The Tide	Hampton Roads Transit	Light rail
Oakland	California	Oakland Airport Connector	BART	Automated guideway transit
Oceanside	California	Sprinter	NCTD	Diesel light rail
Oklahoma City	Oklahoma	Oklahoma City Streetcar	Embark (operated by Herzog Transit Services)	Streetcar
Orlando Metro Area	Florida	SunRail	Central Florida Commuter Rail Commission	Commuter rail
Philadelphia	Pennsylvania, New Jersey	PATCO Speedline	PATCO	Heavy rail
Philadelphia	Pennsylvania, New Jersey, Delaware	SEPTA Regional Rail	SEPTA	Commuter rail
Philadelphia	Pennsylvania	SEPTA Metro ( and)	SEPTA	Heavy rail
Philadelphia	Pennsylvania	SEPTA Metro ( and)	SEPTA	Light rail
Philadelphia	Pennsylvania	SEPTA Metro	SEPTA	Heritage streetcar
Phoenix metro area	Arizona	Valley Metro Rail	Valley Metro	Light rail
Phoenix metro area	Arizona	S Line	Valley Metro	Streetcar
Phoenix metro area	Arizona	PHX Sky Train	City of Phoenix	People mover
Pittsburgh	Pennsylvania	The T	Pittsburgh Regional Transit	Light rail
Portland metro area	Oregon	WES Commuter Rail	TriMet	Commuter rail
Portland	Oregon	MAX	TriMet	Light rail
Portland	Oregon	Portland Streetcar	Portland Streetcar, Inc.	Streetcar
Sacramento	California	SacRT light rail	SacRT	Light rail
St. Louis	Missouri, Illinois	MetroLink	Bi-State Development Agency	Light rail
St. Louis	Missouri	Loop Trolley	Bi-State Development Agency	Heritage streetcar
Salt Lake City metro area	Utah	FrontRunner	Utah Transit Authority	Commuter rail
Salt Lake City metro area	Utah	S Line	Utah Transit Authority	Streetcar
Salt Lake City metro area	Utah	TRAX	Utah Transit Authority	Light rail
San Bernardino	California	Arrow	SCRRA	Commuter rail
San Diego	California	Coaster	North County Transit District	Commuter rail
San Diego	California	San Diego Trolley	San Diego MTS	Light rail
San Diego	California	San Diego Trolley (Silver Line)	San Diego MTS	Heritage streetcar
San Francisco Bay Area	California	Bay Area Rapid Transit	BART	Heavy rail
San Francisco Bay Area	California	Bay Area Rapid Transit	BART	Diesel light rail
San Francisco	California	Muni Metro	San Francisco MTA	Light rail
San Francisco	California	Muni heritage streetcars (E & F)	San Francisco MTA	Heritage streetcar
San Francisco	California	Cable car system	San Francisco MTA	Heritage cable car
San Francisco (Note: While this system is located entirely within unincorporated San Mateo County, it serves the San Francisco International Airport, which is owned and managed by the City and County of San Francisco)	California	AirTrain	SFO Airport	People mover
San Jose	California	Altamont Corridor Express	San Joaquin Regional Rail Commission	Commuter rail
San Jose	California	VTA light rail	Santa Clara VTA	Light rail
San Jose	California	Caltrain	Joint Powers Board	Commuter rail
San Juan	Puerto Rico	Tren Urbano	DTOP	Heavy rail
Seattle/Tacoma	Washington	Sounder	Sound Transit	Commuter rail
Seattle	Washington	Link light rail	Sound Transit (operated by King County Metro)	Light rail
Seattle	Washington	Seattle Center Monorail	City of Seattle	Monorail
Seattle	Washington	Seattle Streetcar	City of Seattle (operated by King County Metro)	Streetcar
Sonoma / Marin	California	Sonoma–Marin Area Rail Transit	Sonoma–Marin Area Rail Transit District	Commuter rail
Southern California	California	Metrolink	SCRRA	Commuter rail
Tacoma	Washington	Link light rail	Sound Transit	Light rail
Tampa	Florida	TECO Line Streetcar	HART	Heritage streetcar
Tucson	Arizona	Sun Link	City of Tucson (operated by RATP)	Streetcar
Washington, D.C.	D.C., Maryland, West Virginia	MARC Train	Maryland Transit Administration	Commuter rail
Washington, D.C.	D.C., Virginia	Virginia Railway Express	Virginia Railway Express	Commuter rail
Washington, D.C.	D.C., Maryland, Virginia	Metrorail	WMATA	Heavy rail

== Under construction ==
Region	State	System	Authority	Type (FTA)	Opening	Notes
Orange County	California	OC Streetcar	Orange County Transportation Authority	Streetcar	2027	
Prince George's County and Montgomery County	Maryland	Purple Line	Maryland Transit Administration	Light rail	2027	
Minneapolis-Saint Paul	Minnesota	Green Line Extension	Metro Transit	Light Rail	2027	
Omaha	Nebraska	Omaha Streetcar	City of Omaha, Nebraska	Streetcar	2028	

== See also ==
- Commuter rail in North America
- List of rail transit systems in North America
- List of rapid transit systems (includes other countries)
- List of tram and light rail transit systems (includes other countries)
- List of streetcar systems in the United States (all-time list, streetcar/interurban/light rail only)
- Light rail in North America
- Streetcars in North America
- Urban rail transit
