= List of rail transit systems in North America =

This list denotes all passenger rail (national services and commuter systems), heavy urban rail (such as rapid transit), light rail, and streetcars that are commuter-oriented. It does not include heritage streetcars, which are usually intended primarily to attract tourists and shoppers to downtown destinations, rather than serving as integral pieces of the regional transportation system.

== Canada ==
- National:

Via Rail – intercity rail network

=== Western Provinces ===
- Calgary

C-Train – 2 light rail lines, operated by Calgary Transit

- Canadian Rocky Mountain Parks

Rocky Mountaineer– intercity tourist rail network

- Edmonton

Edmonton LRT – 3 light rail lines, operated by Edmonton Transit Service
High Level Bridge Streetcar – 1 streetcar line, operated by Edmonton Radial Railway Society

- Okanagan

Rocky Mountaineer– intercity tourist rail network

- Quesnel

Rocky Mountaineer– intercity tourist rail network

- Sea-to-Sky

Rocky Mountaineer– intercity tourist rail network

- Vancouver and Lower Mainland

SkyTrain – 3 rapid transit lines
West Coast Express – 1 commuter rail line, operated by TransLink
Rocky Mountaineer– intercity tourist rail network

=== Ontario ===
- Kitchener-Waterloo (Waterloo Region)

Ion rapid transit – 1 light rail line, operated by Grand River Transit

- Ottawa

O-Train – 1 light metro line, 2 diesel light rail lines, operated by OC Transpo

- Golden Horseshoe Area (Toronto Region)

Toronto subway – 3 rapid transit lines, 2 light rail lines; TTC Streetcars- 11 streetcar lines, operated by the Toronto Transit Commission
GO Transit rail services – 7 commuter rail lines, operated by GO Transit

=== Quebec ===
- Montreal

Montreal Metro – 4 rapid transit lines, operated by Société de transport de Montréal
Exo – 6 commuter rail lines, operated by the Réseau de transport métropolitain
Réseau express métropolitain - 1 light metro line, operated by SNC-Lavalin and Alstom.

== Cuba ==
- National

Ferrocarriles de Cuba – intercity rail network

== Dominican Republic ==
- Santo Domingo

Santo Domingo Metro – 2 rapid transit lines, operated by Oficina para la Reorganizacion del Transporte

== Mexico ==
=== North ===
- Chihuahua and Sinaloa

Ferrocarril Chihuahua al Pacífico – an intercity line from the city of Chihuahua to the port of Topolobampo

- Monterrey

Metrorrey – 3 light metro lines, operated by S.T.C. Metrorrey

=== Pacific Coast ===
- Guadalajara

Sistema de Tren Eléctrico Urbano – 1 metro Line, 3 light rail lines

- Jalisco

Tequila Express – a tourist-oriented excursion line that runs from Guadalajara to Tequila
Tequila Herradura Express – a tourist-oriented excursion line that runs from Guadalajara to Amatitán to visit a tequila distillery

=== Central Highlands ===
- Mexico City

Mexico City Metro – 11 metro lines, with 1 under construction, operated by Sistema de Transporte Colectivo
Mexico City Light Rail – 1 light rail line, operated by Servicio de Transportes Eléctricos
Tren Suburbano – 1 commuter rail line, operated by Ferrocarril Suburbano de la Zona Metropolitana del Valle de México
El Insurgente - 1 commuter rail line, operated by the Secretariat of Infrastructure, Communications and Transportation

=== Yucatán Peninsula ===
- Yucatán Peninsula

Tren Maya – an intercity line in the Yucatán Peninsula, from the Cancún International Airport to Palenque or Chiapas. Owned and operated by the Mexican Armed Forces.

== Puerto Rico ==
- San Juan

Tren Urbano – 1 metro line, operated by Puerto Rico Department of Transportation and Public Works

== United States ==
- National

Amtrak – intercity rail network

=== Gulf and Southern states ===
- Atlanta

MARTA Subway – 4 metro lines, operated by Metropolitan Atlanta Rapid Transit Authority (MARTA)
Atlanta Streetcar – 1 streetcar line, operated by the MARTA and the City of Atlanta

- Austin

CapMetro Rail – 1 hybrid rail line, operated by Capital Metropolitan Transportation Authority

- Charlotte

LYNX Rapid Transit Services – 1 light rail line, 1 streetcar line, operated by Charlotte Area Transit System

- Dallas–Fort Worth

A-train – 1 commuter rail line, operated by Denton County Transportation Authority
DART rail – 4 light rail lines, 1 hybrid rail line (Silver Line), 2 streetcar lines (Dallas Streetcar and M-Line Trolley), operated by Dallas Area Rapid Transit (DART)
Trinity Railway Express – 1 commuter rail line, operated by DART and Trinity Metro
TEXRail – 1 hybrid rail line, operated by Trinity Metro

- Houston

METRORail – 3 light rail lines, with planned expansion, operated by Metropolitan Transit Authority of Harris County, Texas
Galveston Island Trolley - 2 lines operated by Island Transit (Texas)

- Jacksonville

JTA Skyway – 1 people mover line, operated by Jacksonville Transportation Authority

- Miami-Fort Lauderdale-Palm Beach

Metrorail – 2 metro lines; Metromover – 3 people mover lines; both operated by Miami-Dade Transit

Brightline – 1 higher-speed rail line
Tri-Rail – 1 commuter rail line, 1 commuter rail line under construction, operated by the South Florida Regional Transportation Authority

- Nashville

WeGo Star – 1 commuter rail line, operated by the Regional Transportation Authority

- New Orleans

RTA Streetcars – 5 streetcar lines, operated by New Orleans Regional Transit Authority

- Norfolk-Virginia Beach-Newport News (Hampton Roads)

Tide Light Rail – 1 light rail line, with planned extensions, operated by Hampton Roads Transit

- Orlando

SunRail – 1 commuter rail line, operated by the Florida Department of Transportation

=== Midwest and Great Lakes states ===
- Chicago

Chicago 'L' – 8 metro lines, operated by the Chicago Transit Authority
Metra – 11 commuter rail lines, operated by the Northeast Illinois Regional Commuter Railroad Corporation
South Shore Line – 1 commuter rail line, operated by the Northern Indiana Commuter Transportation District

- Cincinnati

Cincinnati Streetcar – 1 streetcar line, operated by the Southwest Ohio Regional Transit Authority

- Cleveland

RTA Rapid Transit – 1 metro line, 3 light rail lines, operated by Greater Cleveland Regional Transit Authority

- Detroit

Detroit People Mover – 1 people mover line, operated by Detroit Department of Transportation
QLine – 1 streetcar line, operated by the Regional Transit Authority of Southeast Michigan

- Kansas City

KC Streetcar – 1 streetcar line, operated by the Kansas City Streetcar Authority

- Milwaukee

The Hop – 2 streetcar lines, operated by the City of Milwaukee

- Minneapolis-St. Paul

METRO – 2 light rail lines, operated by Metro Transit

- Oklahoma City

Oklahoma City Streetcar - 2 streetcar lines, owned by the Oklahoma City Transit Authority

- St. Louis

St. Louis MetroLink – 2 light rail lines, operated by Bi-State Development Agency

=== Northeast ===
- Baltimore

Baltimore Metro Subway – 1 metro line
MTA Light Rail, 3 light rail lines
MARC Train, 3 commuter rail lines (shared with Washington, DC metropolitan area), operated by Maryland Transit Administration

- Boston

The T – 3 metro lines, 2 light rail lines;
MBTA Commuter Rail- 12 commuter rail lines, operated by Massachusetts Bay Transportation Authority
CapeFLYER - 1 commuter rail line, weekends only (operated jointly between MBTA and Cape Cod Regional Transit Authority)

- Buffalo

Buffalo Metro Rail – 1 light rail line, operated by Niagara Frontier Transportation Authority

- Greater New York City (including Newark and Bridgeport/New Haven)

New York City Subway – 25 metro routes on 35 lines
Staten Island Railway – 1 route
Long Island Rail Road – 11 commuter rail lines
Metro-North Railroad – 5 commuter rail lines, operated by Metropolitan Transportation Authority
PATH – 5 metro routes, operated by the Port Authority of New York and New Jersey
NJ Transit Rail – 10 commuter rail lines (shared with Philadelphia metropolitan area)
Hudson-Bergen Light Rail – 2 light rail line
Newark Light Rail – 2 light rail lines operated by New Jersey Transit
Hartford Line – 1 commuter rail line, operated by the Connecticut Department of Transportation
Shore Line East – 1 commuter rail line, operated by the Connecticut Department of Transportation

- Greater Philadelphia

SEPTA Metro – 2 metro lines, 5 subway-surface trolleys, two suburban trolleys, one interurban, one heritage streetcar
SEPTA Regional Rail – 13 commuter rail lines, operated by Southeastern Pennsylvania Transportation Authority
PATCO Speedline – 1 metro line, operated by the Port Authority Transit Corporation
NJ Transit Rail – 1 commuter rail line (shared with New York City metropolitan area), operated by NJ Transit
River Line – 1 light rail line, operated by New Jersey Transit

- Pittsburgh

The T – 2 light rail lines (and one with operations presently suspended), operated by the Port Authority of Allegheny County

- Greater Washington, D.C.

Washington Metro – 6 metro lines, operated by Washington Metropolitan Area Transit Authority
MARC Train – 3 commuter rail lines (shared with Baltimore metropolitan area), operated by the Maryland Transit Administration
Virginia Railway Express – 2 commuter rail lines, operated by the Potomac and Rappahannock Transportation Commission
DC Streetcar – 1 streetcar line, owned by the District of Columbia Department of Transportation and operated by a private contractor

=== Pacific Northwest ===
- Seattle–Tacoma

Link light rail – 2 light rail lines, owned by Sound Transit, with the 1 Line and 2 Line operated by King County Metro and the T Line operated by Sound Transit
Sounder commuter rail – 2 commuter rail lines, operated by Sound Transit
Seattle Center Monorail - 1 monorail line, owned by the City of Seattle and operated by a private contractor
Seattle Streetcar – 2 streetcar lines, owned by the City of Seattle and operated by King County Metro

- Portland

MAX Light Rail – 5 light rail lines, operated by TriMet
Portland Streetcar – 2 streetcar lines, owned by City of Portland, managed by a non-profit corporation, operated by TriMet
WES Commuter Rail – 1 commuter rail line, operated by TriMet

=== Mountain West ===
- Albuquerque–Santa Fe

New Mexico Rail Runner Express – 1 commuter rail line, operated by the New Mexico Department of Transportation

- Denver

RTD Rail – 4 heavy rail lines and 6 light rail lines with two under construction, operated by the Regional Transportation District
Rocky Mountaineer– intercity tourist rail network

- Moab

Rocky Mountaineer– intercity tourist rail network

- Phoenix–Tempe–Mesa

Valley Metro Rail & Streetcar – 2 light rail lines, 1 streetcar line, operated by Valley Metro

- Salt Lake City

The FrontRunner – 1 commuter rail train, operated by Utah Transit Authority (UTA)
S Line streetcar – 1 streetcar line, with more planned, operated by UTA
TRAX – 3 light rail lines, with more lines planned, operated by UTA
Rocky Mountaineer– intercity tourist rail network

- Tucson, Arizona

Sun Link – 1 streetcar line, owned by the City of Tucson and operated by a private contractor

=== Pacific Southwest ===
- Honolulu

Skyline – 1 light metro line, operated by TheBus

- Las Vegas

Las Vegas Monorail – 1 monorail line, operated by the Las Vegas Monorail Company

- Los Angeles–Inland Empire

Los Angeles Metro Rail – 2 metro lines, 4 light rail lines, operated by Los Angeles Metro
Metrolink – 7 commuter rail lines, operated by Southern California Regional Rail Authority

- Sacramento

SacRT light rail – 3 light rail lines, operated by Sacramento Regional Transit District

- San Bernardino

Arrow – 1 rail lines, operated by San Bernardino Transportation Authority
Metrolink – 2 commuter rail lines, operated by Southern California Regional Rail Authority

- San Diego

San Diego Trolley – 4 light rail lines (not counting the Silver Line and Special Event Line) operated by San Diego Metropolitan Transit System
Coaster – 1 commuter rail line; Sprinter – 1 commuter rail line, operated by North County Transit District

- San Francisco–Oakland–San Jose (Bay Area)

Bay Area Rapid Transit – 5 rapid transit lines, one DMU hybrid rail line, and one AGT line, operated by San Francisco Bay Area Rapid Transit District
Muni Metro – 6 light rail lines, with one under construction; F Line – 1 streetcar line, operated by San Francisco Municipal Railway
VTA light rail – 3 light rail lines, operated by Santa Clara Valley Transportation Authority
Caltrain –1 commuter rail line, operated by the Peninsula Corridor Joint Powers Board
Altamont Corridor Express – 1 commuter rail line, operated by the San Joaquin Regional Rail Commission Joint Powers Board
Sonoma–Marin Area Rail Transit – 1 commuter rail line, operated by the Sonoma-Marin Area Rail Transit District

== Systems under construction ==
- Orange County, CA

OC Streetcar – 1 streetcar line, to be operated by Orange County Transportation Authority

- Omaha

Omaha Streetcar – 1 streetcar line, to be operated by the City of Omaha

- Golden Horseshoe Area (Toronto Reigon)

Hurontario LRT – 1 metro line, to be operated by Transdev, and owned by Metrolinx
Ontario Line – 1 metro line, to be operated by Connect 6ix, and owned by Metrolinx
Hamilton LRT – 1 metro line, operater TBD, and owned by Metrolinx

- Washington DC Metropolitan Area

Purple Line (Maryland) – 1 light rail line, to be operated by Purple Line Transit Partners, and owned by the Maryland Transit Administration

- Edmonton

Valley Line West – 1 light rail line extension, to be operated by Edmonton Transit Service

- Calgary

Green Line (Calgary) – 1 light rail line, to be operated by Calgary Transit

- Ottawa

Line 3 (O-Train) – 1 light rail line, to be operated by OC Transpo

== Approved systems preparing for construction ==
- Charlotte

Lynx Red Line – 1 commuter rail line, to be operated by LYNX Rapid Transit Services

- Quebec City

Quebec City Tramway – 1 light rail line, to be operated by CDPQ Infra, and owned by Government of Quebec

- San Juan

San Juan-Caguas Rail – 1 commuter rail line, to be operated by Puerto Rico Department of Transportation and Public Works

== See also ==
- List of rail transit systems in the United States
- List of railroad bankruptcies in North America
