= NingBo Vocational Education Central School =

Vocational school in Ningbo, China

Ningbo Vocational Education Central School (VEC; simplified Chinese: 宁波市职业技术教育中心学校; traditional Chinese: 寧波市職業技術教育中心學校) is a national-level key vocational school in Ningbo, China. It was established in 1957 under the name "Ningbo 18th High School" or "Yifu vocational senior high school".

== Honor ==
- National-level key vocational school
- Education and scientific research of advanced collective
- Modern education technology school

== Departments ==
- Dept. of Computer network technology
- Dept. of Electronic commerce
- Dept. of Graphic design
- Dept. of Computerized accounting
- Dept. of Computer software design
- Dept. of CNC tooling making
- Dept. of Auto repair
- Dept. of Numerical control
- Dept. of Urban railway system control
- Dept. of Urban rail transit management
- Dept. of Mechatronics
- Dept. of Industrial product design
