= Island Transit =

Island Transit refers to one of two transit companies in the United States

- Island Transit (Texas) is a public transit company operating in Galveston, Texas. The company runs several bus routes, and a street car system.
- Island Transit (Washington) a zero-fare bus system in Island County, Washington serving Whidbey Island and Camano Island.
