= Pleasanton station =

Train station in Pleasanton, California, U.S.

Pleasanton

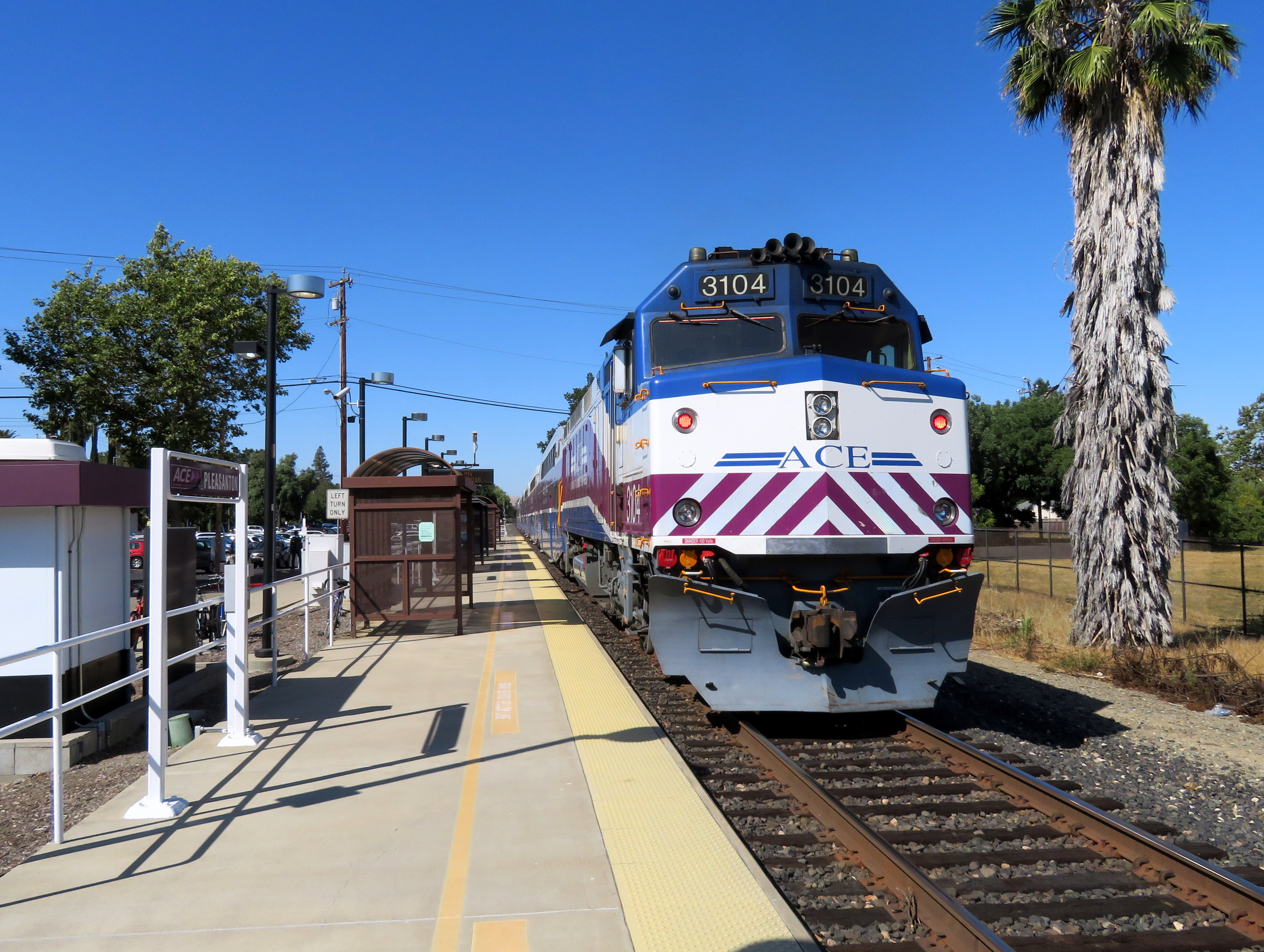
- Eastbound train leaving Pleasanton station in 2018

General information
- Location: 4950 Pleasanton Avenue; Pleasanton, California
- Coordinates: 37°39′30.28″N 121°52′55.9″W
- Line: UP Oakland Subdivision
- Platforms: 1 side platform
- Tracks: 1
- Connections: County Connection 53, 54; WHEELS: 92X

Construction
- Parking: Yes, shared with Alameda County Fairgrounds
- Accessible: yes

Other information
- Station code: Amtrak: PLS
- Fare zone: Tri-Valley

History
- Opened: October 19, 1998

Services
Preceding station	Altamont Corridor Express	Following station
Fremont toward San Jose	San Jose – Stockton	Livermore toward Stockton
Former services
Preceding station	Western Pacific Railroad	Following station
Fremont toward Oakland	California Zephyr	Stockton toward Chicago
Niles toward Oakland	Feather River Route	Livermore toward Salt Lake City

Proposed services (2030)
Preceding station	Altamont Corridor Express	Following station
Union City Terminus	Union City – Merced	Livermore toward Merced
Union City Terminus	Union City – Natomas	Livermore toward Natomas
Location

Pleasanton station is a train station in Pleasanton, California served by Altamont Corridor Express (ACE) trains. It is located northwest of downtown Pleasanton adjacent to the Alameda County Fairgrounds. The station has a single side platform on the single track of the Union Pacific Railroad Oakland Subdivision.

== History ==
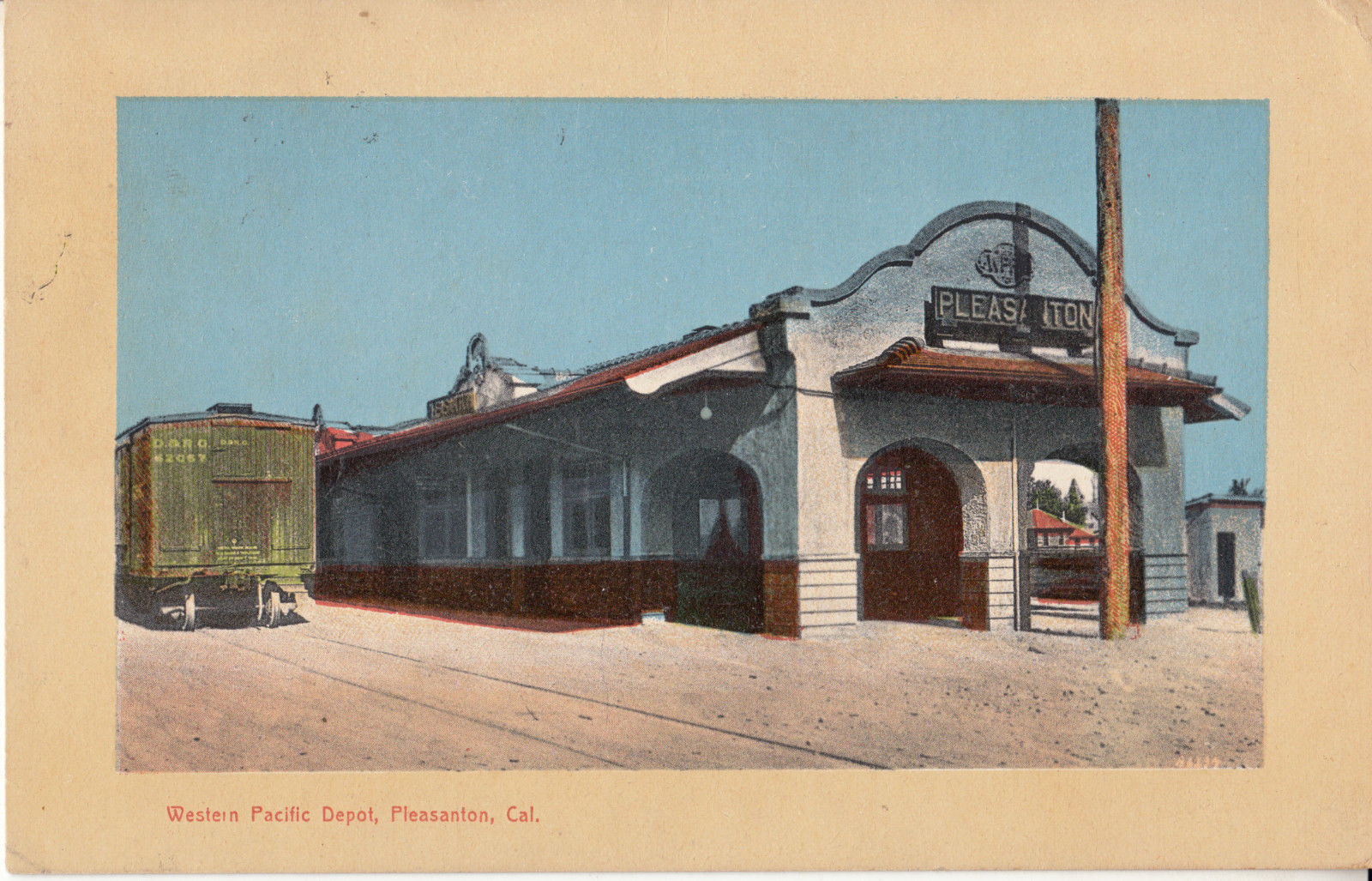
The former Western Pacific Railroad station in the early 20th century

The station is located on the Union Pacific Railroad Oakland Subdivision, formerly the 1910-opened Western Pacific Railroad mainline. The Mission Revival-style station north of Rose Avenue, which served the California Zephyr until 1970, is no longer extant.

The now-abandoned Southern Pacific Railroad Niles Subdivision was constructed by a different Western Pacific Railroad through downtown Pleasanton in 1869. The first station burned on July 26, 1873; the Central Pacific Railroad replaced it with a one-story station, which was expanded in 1881. A larger station was constructed in 1895; the older station was moved to Second Street, where it remains as a private home. Passenger service ended in 1941; the newer station is now a restaurant.

A new station southwest of the former Western Pacific station site opened with the start of the Altamont Commuter Express service on October 19, 1998.

== Bus connections ==
WHEELS local routes 53 and 54 service the station, plus the County Connection express route 92X which provides access to ACE from the San Ramon Valley to the north.

The 8 and 10R WHEELS routes connect to the Dublin/Pleasanton BART station.
