= Livermore station =

Train stop for Altamont Commuter Express

Livermore

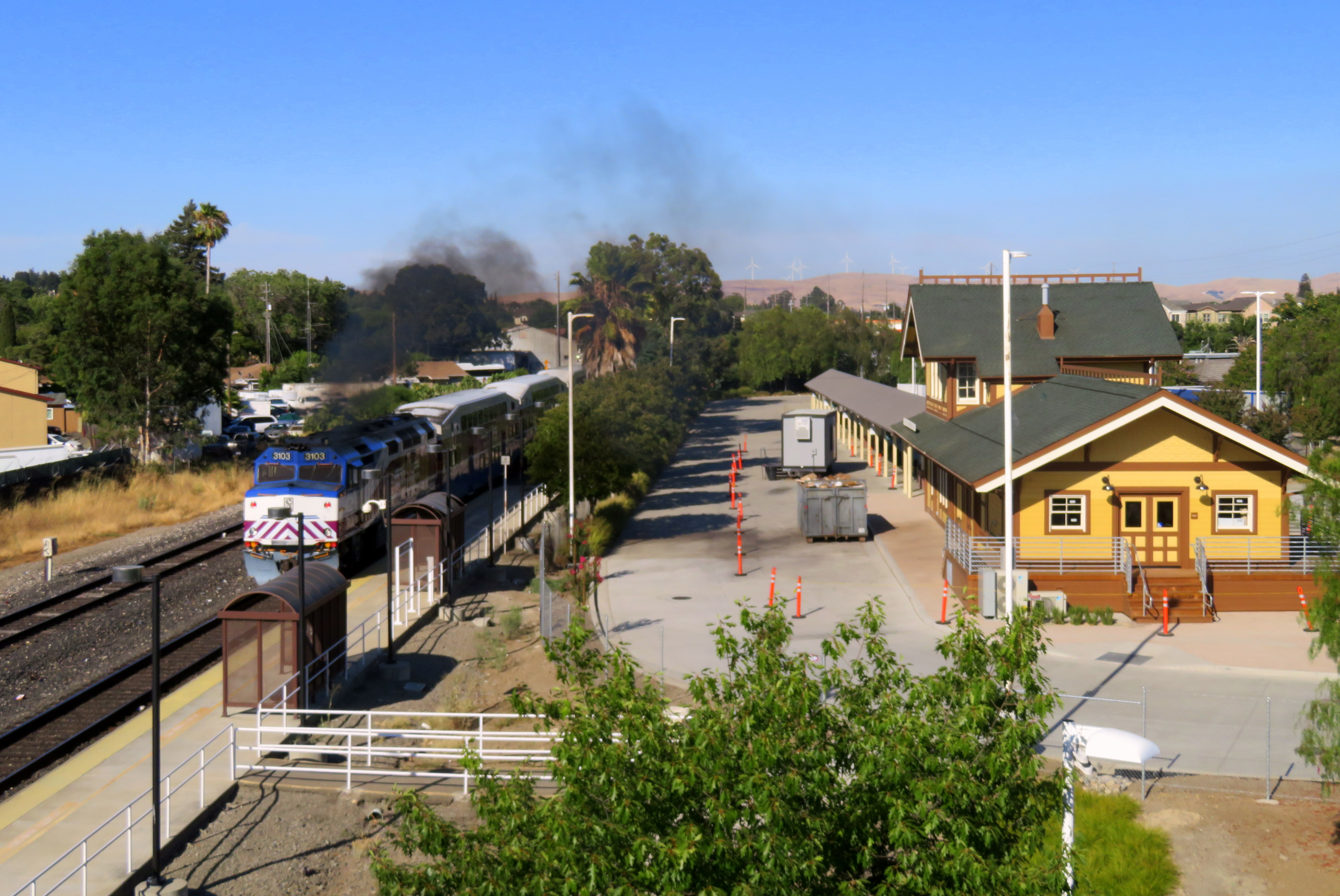
- An eastbound train leaving Livermore station in 2018

General information
- Location: 2418 Railroad Avenue; Livermore, California
- Coordinates: 37.6851°N 121.7676°W
- Line: UP Oakland Subdivision
- Platforms: 1 side platform
- Tracks: 2

Construction
- Parking: free
- Accessible: yes

Other information
- Station code: Amtrak: LIV

History
- Opened: October 19, 1998

Services
| Preceding station | Altamont Corridor Express | Following station |
|---|---|---|
| Pleasanton toward San Jose | San Jose – Stockton | Vasco Road toward Stockton |
Former services
| Preceding station | Western Pacific Railroad | Following station |
|---|---|---|
| Pleasanton toward Oakland | Feather River Route | Carbona toward Salt Lake City |
| Preceding station | Southern Pacific Railroad | Following station |
| Pleasanton toward Oakland Pier | San Joaquin Valley Line | Altamont toward Los Angeles |
| San Ramon toward Avon | Avon – San Ramon | Terminus |
Location

Livermore is a train station in downtown Livermore, California.

== Transit service ==
The station is served by commuter Altamont Corridor Express (ACE) trains between San Jose's Diridon Station and Stockton's Cabral Station. The majority of passengers at this station are commuters headed to job centers in the Silicon Valley. WHEELS routes 10R, 11, 14, 15, 20X, 580X and 30R stop at the adjacent Livermore Transit Center.

The I Street Garage opened on July 7, 2022, as a 274-space addition of the existing 500-space parking garage.

== Bus service ==
There are six daily Amtrak Thruway trips on line 6 to San Jose and a once daily to San Francisco on line 34.

== History ==
The tracks are on the alignment of the Western Pacific Railroad, which established a station in Livermore. Located south of the tracks between K and L Streets, it began serving passengers in August 1910. That station was closed in 1951 and demolished in 1956.

Livermore was one of ACE's inaugural stops upon commencement of service on October 19, 1998. This station was originally planned as the site of a co-located BART station when the planned Livermore Extension was built from the terminus at Dublin/Pleasanton to Vasco Road. However, in July 2011, the Livermore City Council reversed its position in response to a petition requesting that the alignment stay within or nearby the Interstate 580 right-of-way, and then favored stations be built at the Interstate 580 interchanges with Isabel Avenue and Portola Avenue. BART extension plans fell through in the late 2010s and the subsequent Valley Link line is planned to serve stations in the Interstate 580 median.

After the Southern Pacific tracks through Livermore were removed in the 1970s, that railroad's Livermore depot had been orphaned from any rail infrastructure. Constructed in 1892 and saved from demolition in 1973, the building was used for various businesses before being purchased by the city and moved to its current location at the Livermore Transit Center in 2017.
