= Vasco Road station =

Train station in Livermore, California, US

Vasco

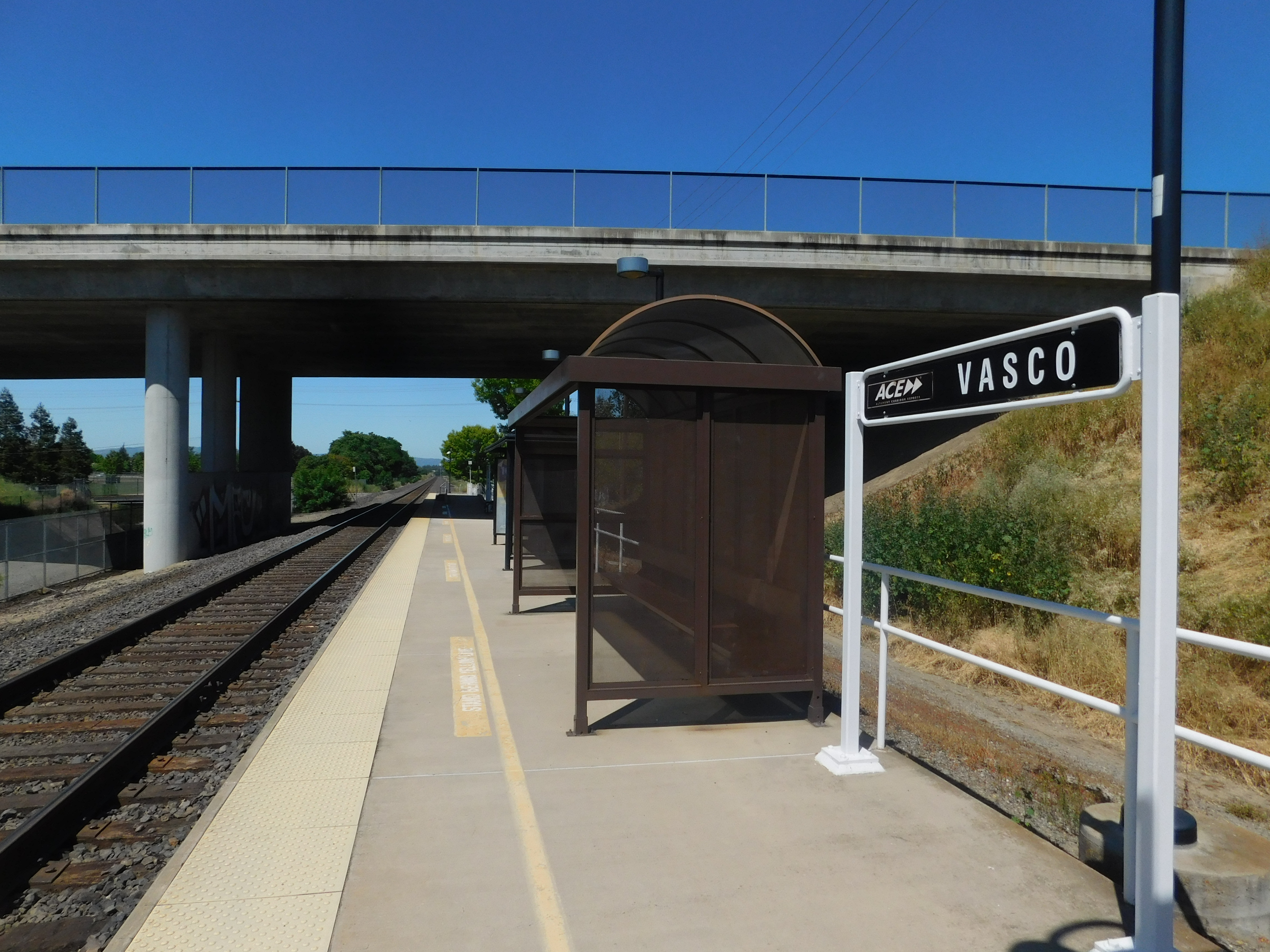
- Vasco Road station in May 2023.

General information
- Location: 575 South Vasco Road; Livermore, California
- Coordinates: 37°41′48.85″N 121°43′6.7″W
- Line: UP Oakland Subdivision
- Platforms: 1 side platform
- Tracks: 1

Construction
- Parking: free
- Accessible: yes

Other information
- Station code: Amtrak: VAS

History
- Opened: October 19, 1998

Services
Preceding station	Altamont Corridor Express	Following station
Livermore toward San Jose	San Jose – Stockton	Tracy toward Stockton
Planned services
Preceding station	Valley Link	Following station
Isabel toward Dublin/Pleasanton	Initial Operating Phase	Terminus
Location

Vasco Road station (signed as Vasco) is an ACE station on Vasco Road in eastern Livermore, California. The station mainly serves the workers of Lawrence Livermore National Laboratory, Sandia National Laboratory and the surrounding industrial and office parks in eastern Livermore in addition to commuters from Livermore headed to job centers in the Silicon Valley to the southwest.

BART approved an alignment for its Livermore extension to run along Interstate 580 then tunnel underneath Isabel Avenue to the Livermore ACE station and then continue along the right-of-way to Vasco Road to serve as its final terminal. However, in July 2011, the Livermore City Council reversed its position in response to a petition requesting that the alignment stay within or nearby the Interstate 580 right-of-way, and now favors stations be built at the Interstate 580 interchanges with Isabel Avenue and Greenville Road. The BART extension was later replaced with the Valley Link proposal, again along the I-580 alignment.
