= Urban rail transit =

Train service intended for city-dwellers

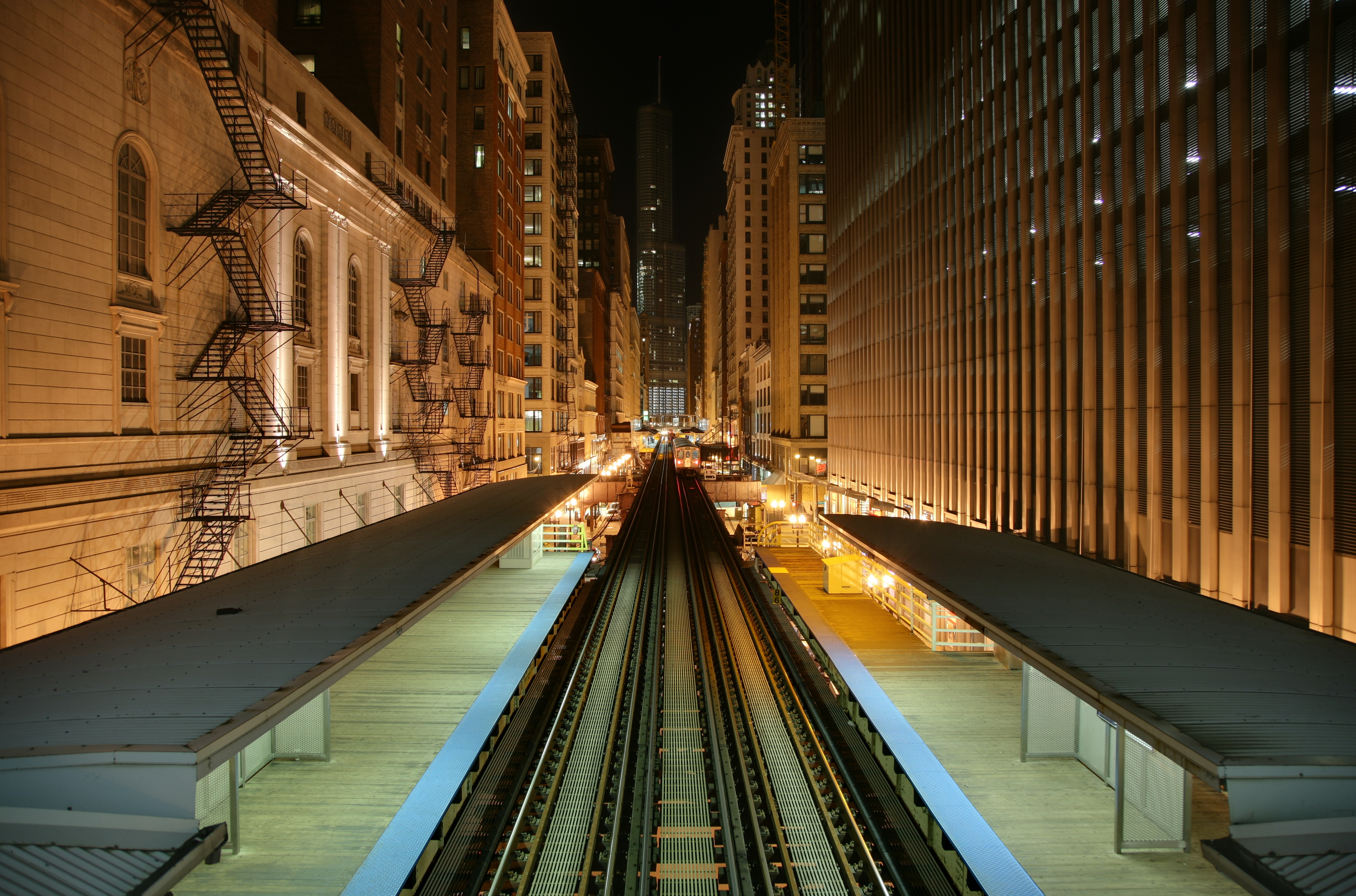
A view of the Chicago 'L' from Adams/Wabash in the Chicago Loop

Urban rail transit is a wide term for various types of local rail systems providing passenger service within and around urban or suburban areas. The set of urban rail systems can be roughly subdivided into the following categories, which sometimes overlap because some systems or lines have aspects of multiple types.

== Types ==
=== Tram ===
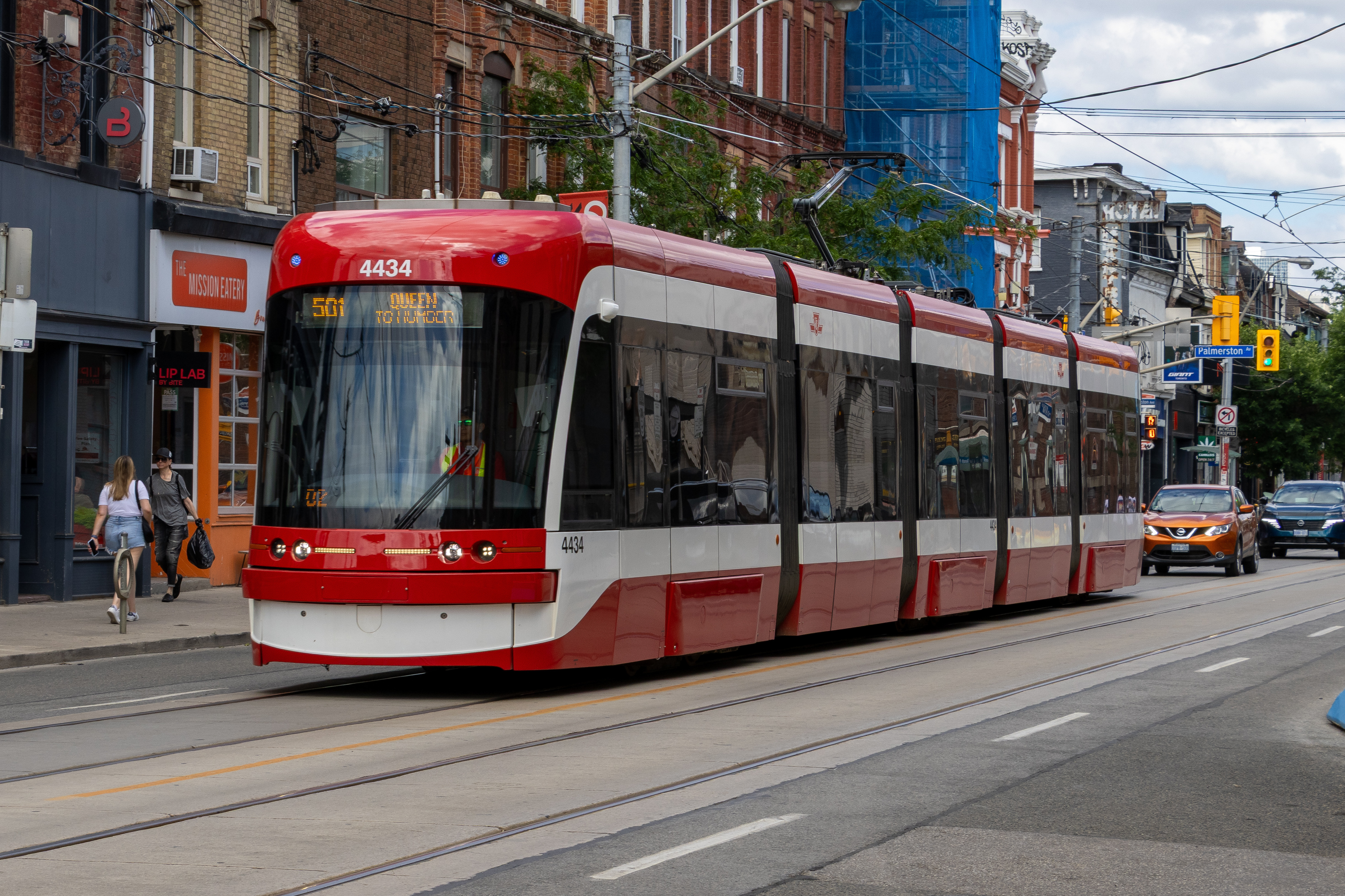
The Toronto streetcar system is an extensive tram network.

A tram, streetcar, or trolley system is a rail-based transit system that runs mainly or completely along streets (with street running), with a relatively-low capacity and frequent stops; however, modern trams have a greater passenger capacity than traditional trams. Passengers usually board at the street or curb level, but low-floor trams may allow level boarding. Longer-distance lines are called interurbans or radial railways. Modern trams also operate as self-propelled trains coupled through a multiple unit instead of individual trams and are often included within the broader term light rail; however, they differ in that trams frequently share the platform with vehicular traffic and do not have signal priority.

The term "tram" is used in most parts of the world. In North America, such systems are referred to as "streetcar" or "trolley" systems. In Germany, such systems are called Straßenbahn, which literally translates as "street train" or "street railway".

==== Cable car or Cable Tram ====
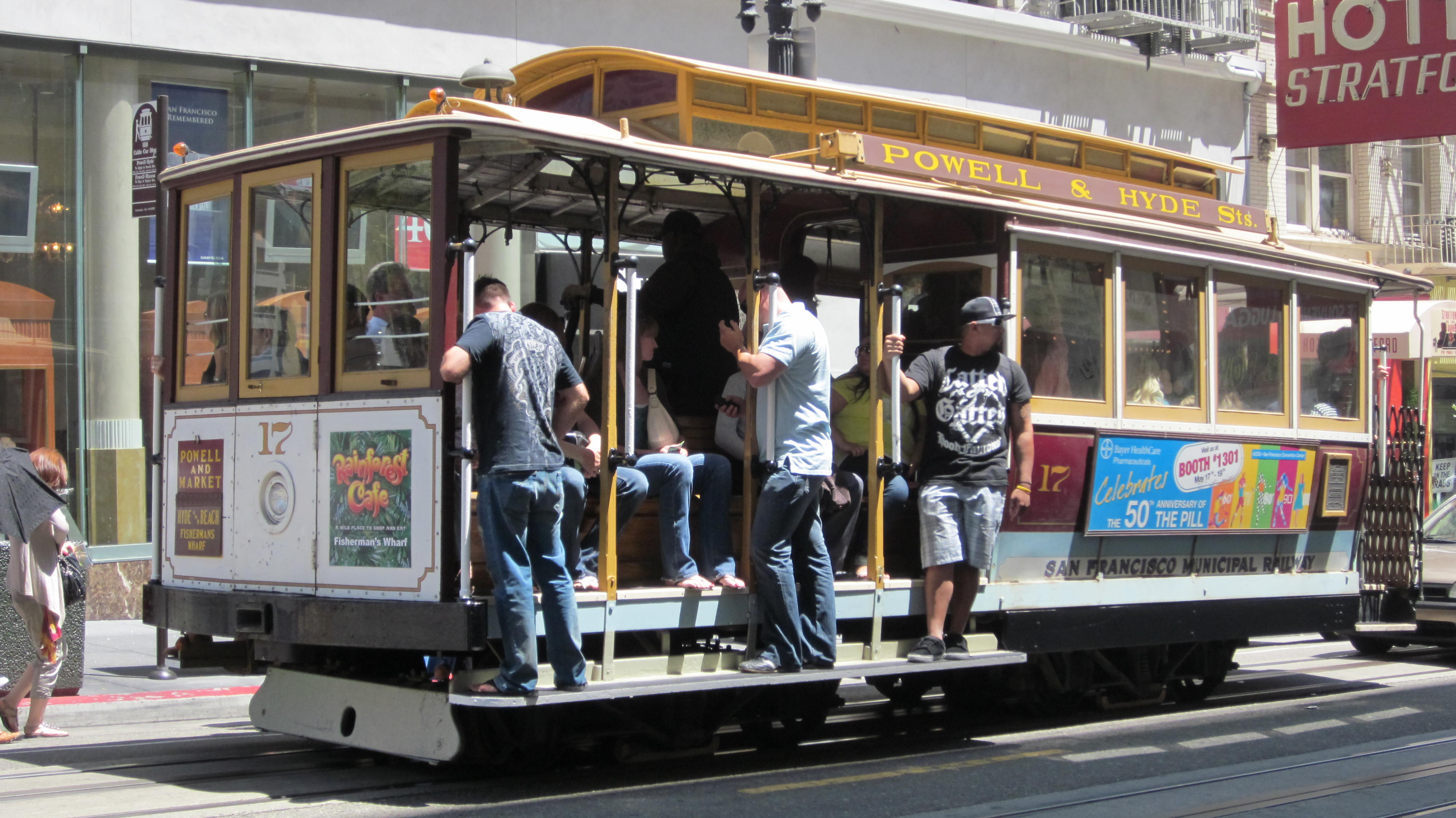
A San Francisco cable car on the Powell & Hyde line.

A cable car, in the context of mass transit, is a system using rail cars that are hauled by a continuously moving cable that runs at a constant speed. Individual cars stop and start by releasing and gripping the cable as required. Cable cars are distinct from funiculars (whose cars are permanently attached to the cable) and cable railways (which are similar to funiculars but have rail vehicles that are attached and detached manually).

=== Light rail ===
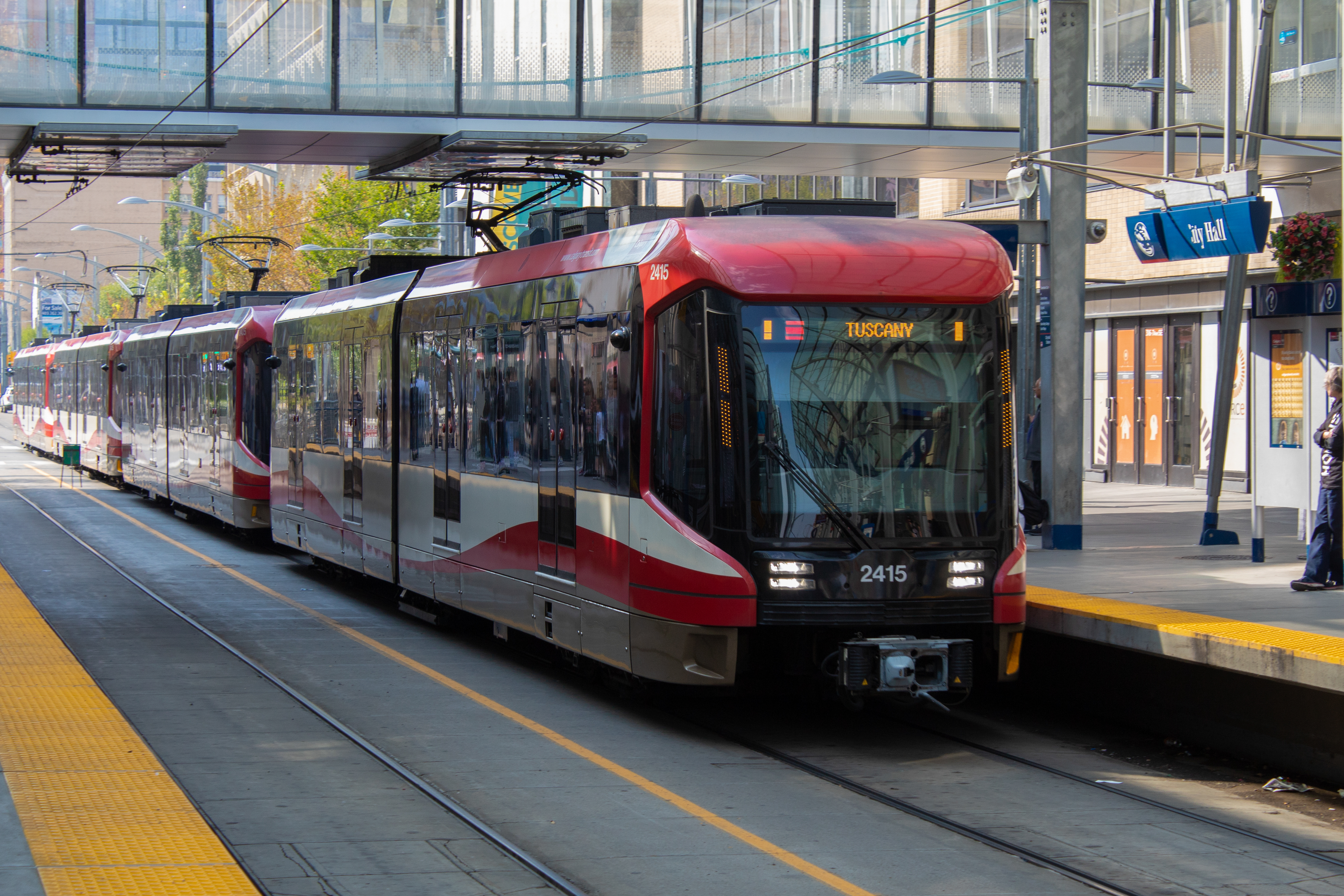
The CTrain is a light rail system operated by Calgary Transit.

A light rail system is a rail-based transit system that has higher capacity and speed than a tram, usually by operating in an exclusive right-of-way separated from road traffic, but it is not, unlike rapid transit, fully grade-separated from it. Light rail also regularly operates with multiple-unit trains, rather than single tramcars. It emerged as an evolution of trams. Light rail systems vary significantly in terms of speed and capacity and range from slightly improved tram systems to systems that are essentially rapid transit but with some level crossings.

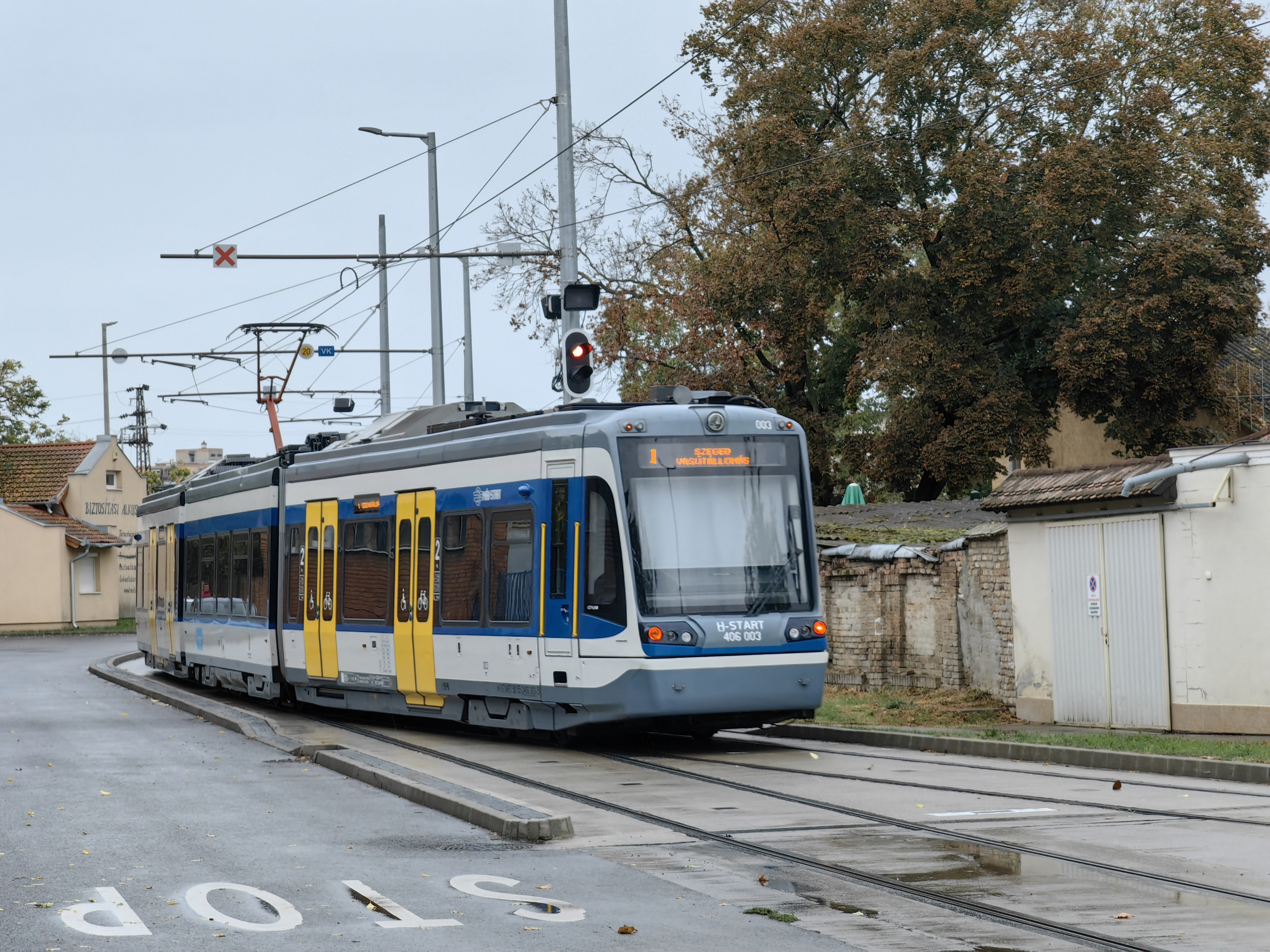
Szeged-Hódmezővásárhely Tram-train

The term "light rail" is the most common term especially in Americas, but German systems are called Stadtbahn, which translates to "city railway". Additionally tram-train systems are called Regionalstadtbahn and tram systems with underground sections are called U-Stadtbahn or U-Strab.

=== Rapid transit ===
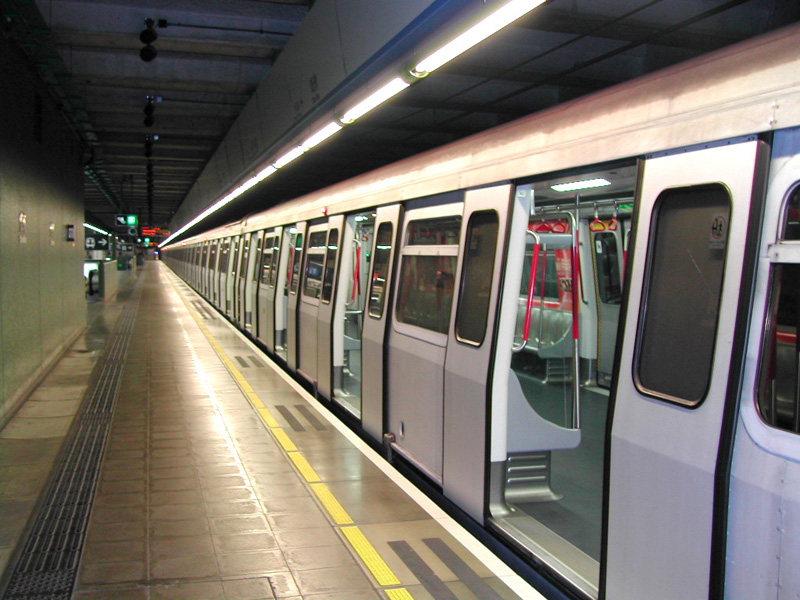
The Hong Kong MTR operates a high-capacity rapid transit network.

A rapid transit system is a railway, usually in an urban area, with high passenger capacities and frequency of service and (usually) full grade separation from other traffic, including other rail traffic. It is sometimes known as "heavy rail" to distinguish it from light rail. Both heavy and light often refer to the capacity and sometimes to investment costs. Rapid transit systems (with full grade separation) with a lower passenger capacity are termed light rapid transit or medium capacity system.

In most parts of the world, such systems are known as a "metro", short for "metropolitan", which is itself short for "Metropolitan Railway", the first such system in the world. The term "subway" is used in many American systems, as well as in Glasgow and in Toronto. The system in London is named the "Underground" and is commonly nicknamed the "tube". Systems in Germany are called "U-Bahn", which stands for Untergrundbahn ("underground rail"). Many systems in East, Southeast and South Asia like Taipei, Chennai and Singapore, are called "MRT", which stands for "mass rapid transit". Systems that are predominantly elevated may be referred to as "L", as in Chicago, or "Skytrain", as in Bangkok and Vancouver. Other less common names include "T-bane", which stands for "tunnelbana" (in Scandinavia, literally tunnel track) and "MTR" (mass transit railway).

=== Commuter rail ===
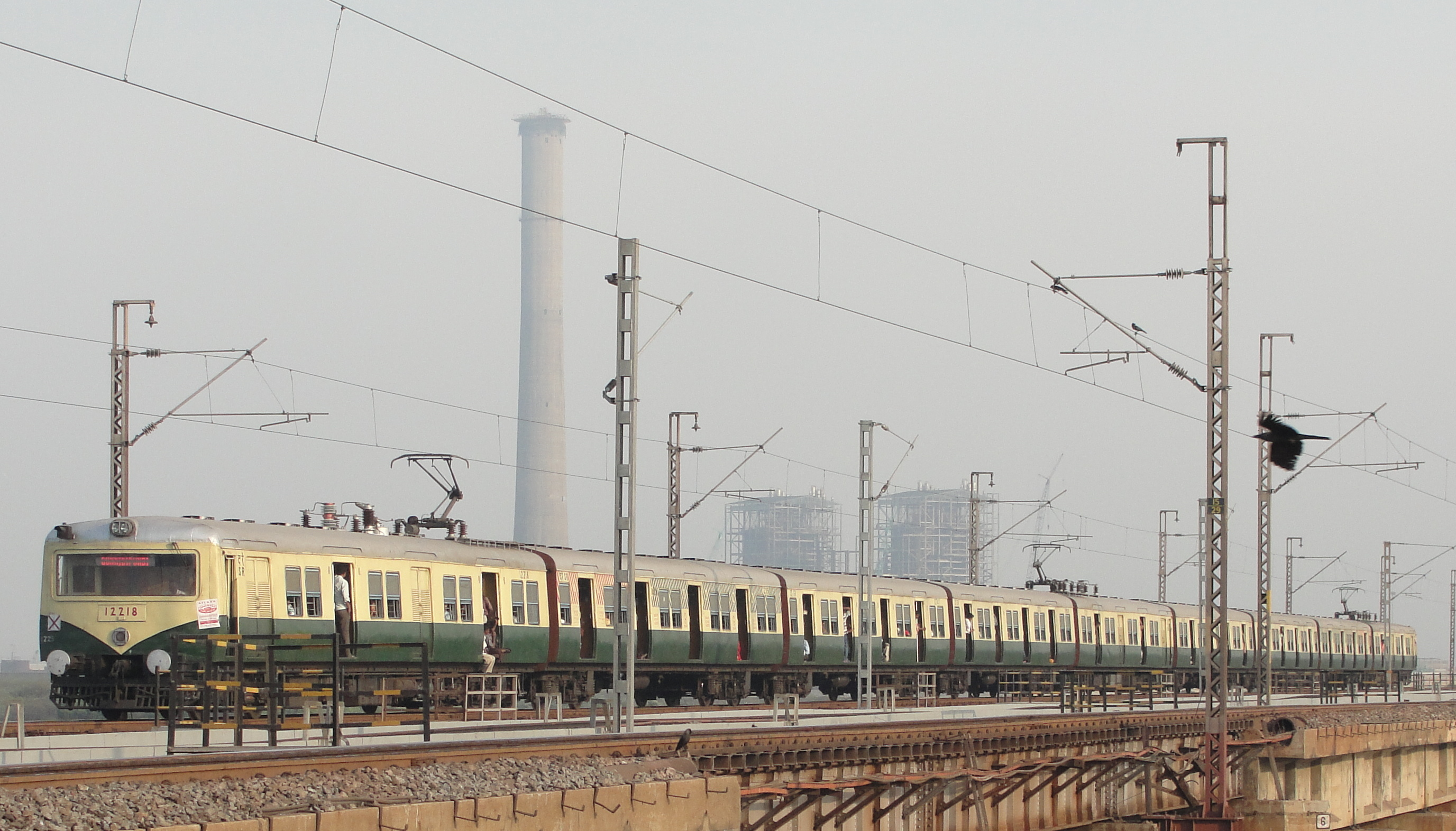
Chennai Suburban railway operates train in Greater Chennai in India.

A commuter rail, regional rail or suburban rail system operates on mainline trackage, which may be shared with intercity rail and freight trains. Systems tend to operate at lower frequencies than rapid transit or light rail systems but tend to travel at higher speeds, have more widely spaced stations and cover longer overall distances. They have high passenger capacities per single train.

Though many European and East Asian commuter rail systems operate with frequencies and rolling stock similar to that of rapid transit, they do not qualify as such because they share tracks with intercity/freight trains, or they have at grade crossings. For example, S-trains are hybrid systems combining the characteristics of both rapid transit and commuter rail systems. Generally, S-trains share tracks with mainline passenger and freight trains, but the distances between stations and the service headway resemble metro systems.

==== Diesel light rail ====
Hybrid rail, often referred to as "diesel light rail transit" (DLRT) use multiple unit rolling stock originally designed for main line networks.

=== Automated guideway transit ===
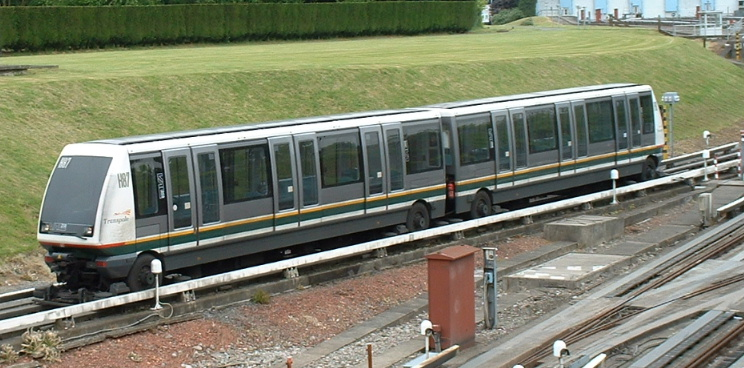
VAL-208 type train in the Lille Metro.

Automated guideway transit systems tend to operate with medium passenger capacities.

Larger systems span a variety of conceptual designs, from subway-like advanced rapid transit (ART) systems to smaller (typically two to six passengers) vehicles known as personal rapid transit (PRT) which offer direct point-to-point travel along a switched network.

=== Monorail ===
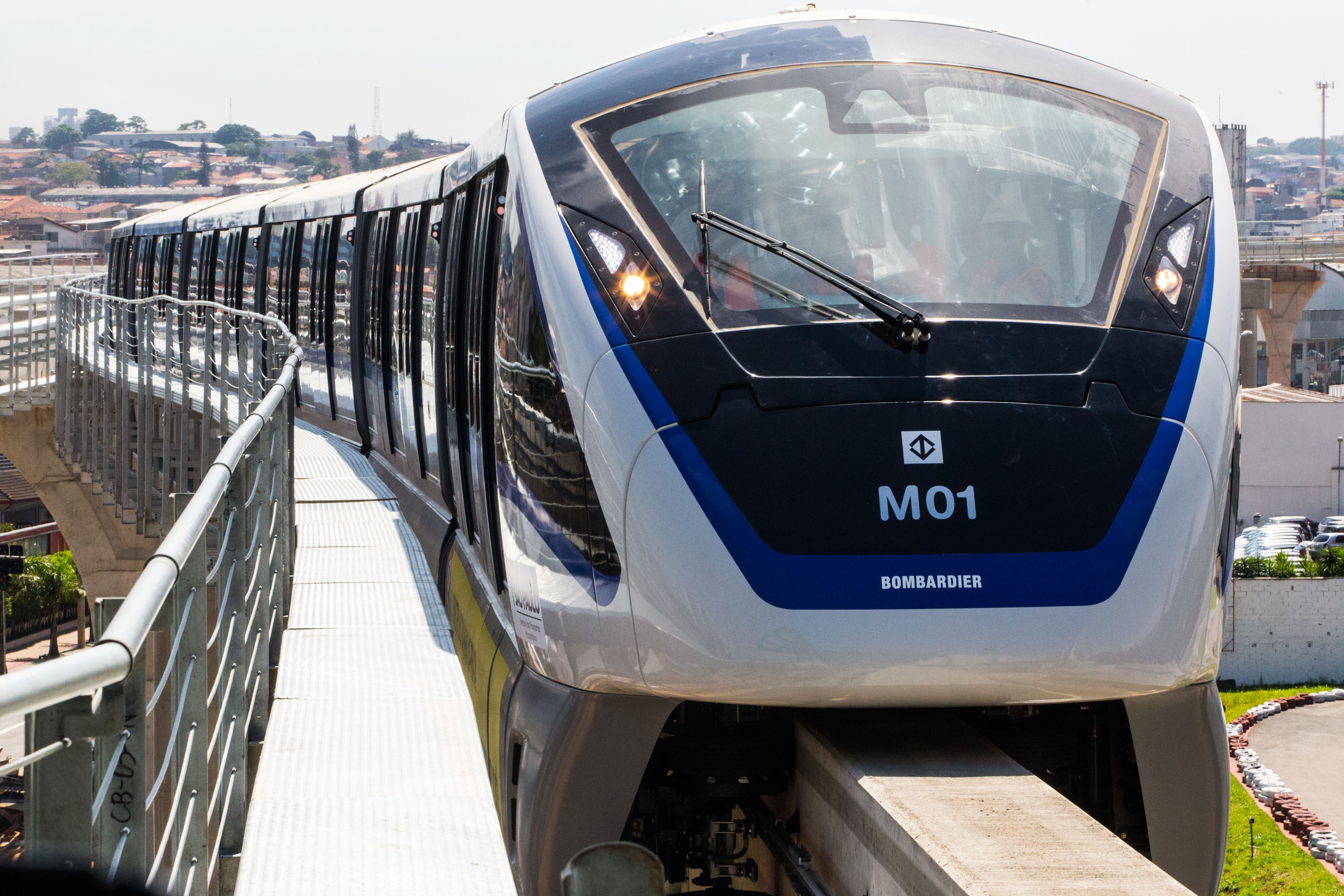
São Paulo Metro Line 15, is the second busiest monorail line worldwide.

A monorail is a railway in which the track consists of a single rail or beam, as opposed to the traditional track with two parallel rails.

The term possibly comes from 1897, from German engineer Eugen Langen, who called an elevated railway system with wagons suspended the Eugen Langen One-railed Suspension Tramway (Einschieniges Hängebahnsystem Eugen Langen).

=== Funicular ===
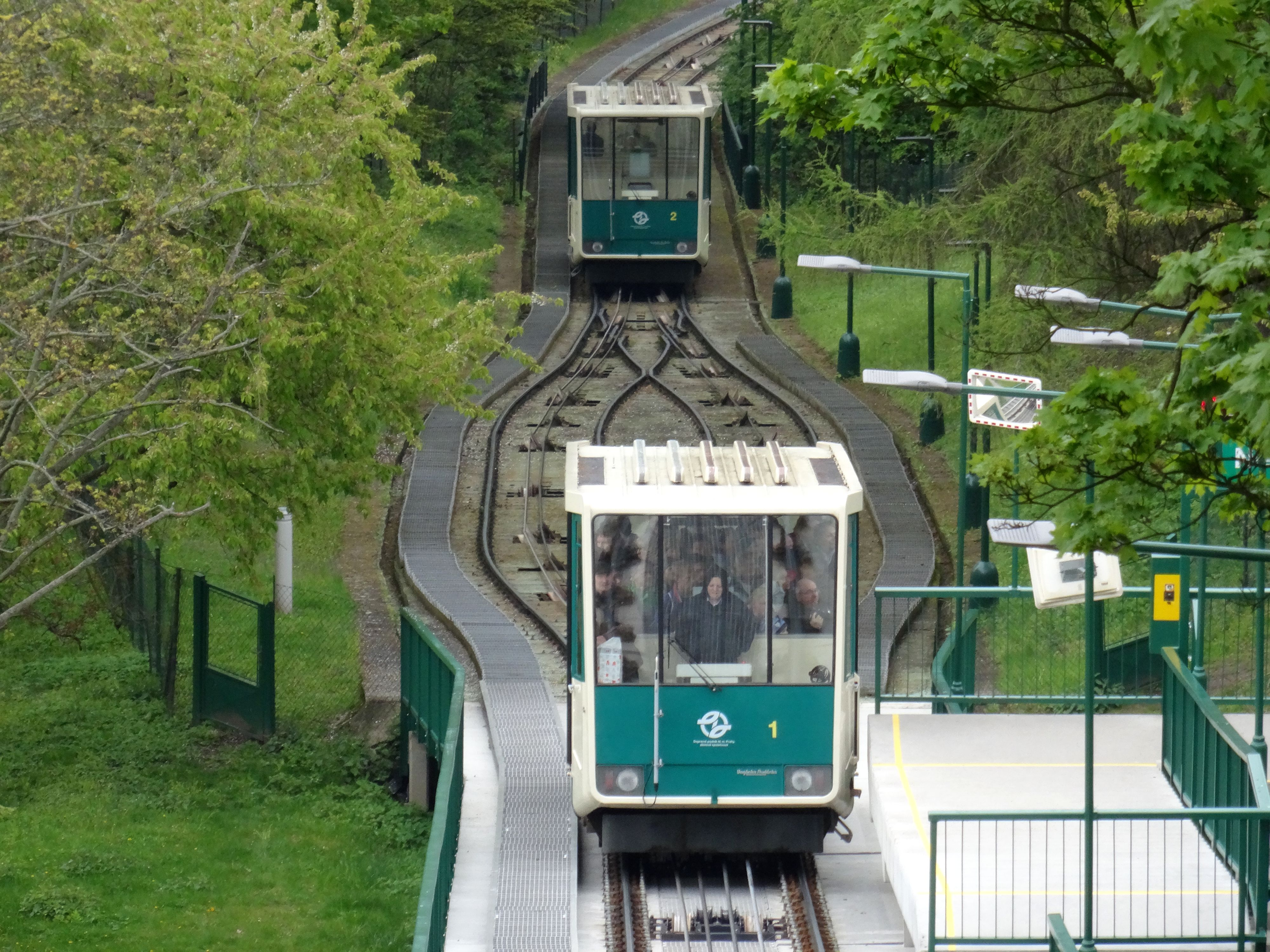
The two cars of the Petřín funicular.

A funicular is a cable-driven inclined railway that uses the weight of descending cars to help pull the ascending cars up the slope.

The term funicular derives from the Latin word funiculus, the diminutive of funis, meaning 'rope'.

=== Related types ===
==== Guided bus ====
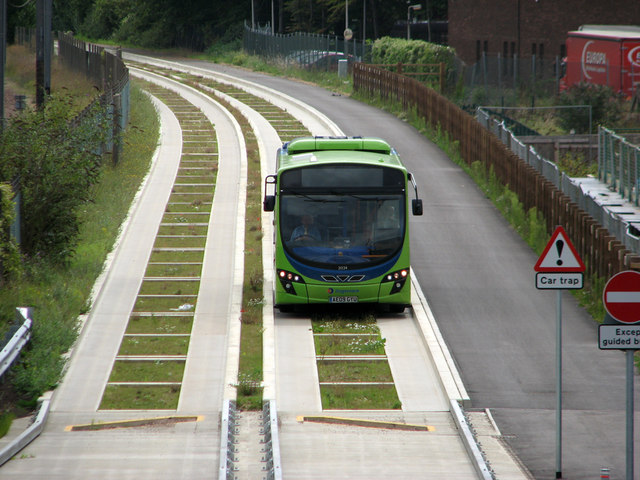
Guided bus from Trumpington

A bus shares many characteristics with light rail and trams but does not run on rails. Trolleybuses are buses that are powered from overhead wires. Vehicles that can travel both on rails and on roads have been tried experimentally but are not in common use. The term bus rapid transit is used to refer to various methods of providing faster bus services and the systems that use it have similar characteristics to light rail. Guided buses are buses capable of being steered by external means, usually on a dedicated track or roll way that excludes other traffic. Some cities experimenting with guided bus technologies, such as Nancy, have chosen to refer to them as 'trams on tires' (rubber-tired trams) and given them tram-like appearances.

== Naming issues ==
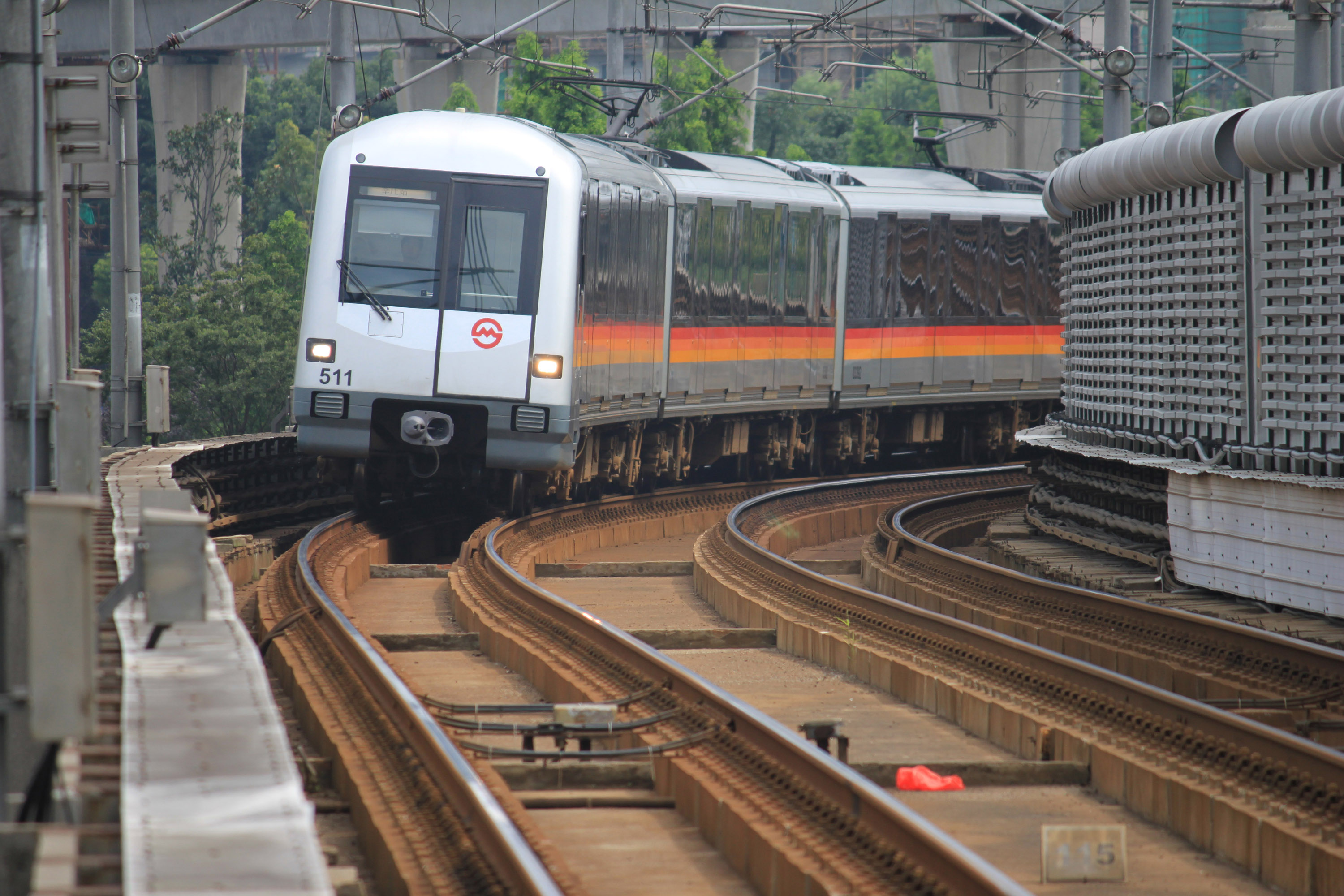
Shanghai Metro Line 5 is a rapid transit line that is erroneously referred to as light rail.

Transit agencies' names for lines do not necessarily reflect their technical categorization. For example, the Green Line in Boston is referred to as a subway although it is mostly made up of above-ground portions. Conversely, the Docklands Light Railway in London, C Line in Los Angeles, O-Train in Ottawa, and some metro lines in China are referred to as "Light Rail" but qualify as rapid transit because they are fully grade-separated and provide a high frequency of service. The Brisbane Metro is actually a Bus Rapid Transit system.

Many cities use names such as subway and elevated railway to describe their entire systems, even if they combine both methods of transportation. Slightly less than half of the London Underground's tracks, for example, are actually underground. The New York City Subway also combines elevated and subterranean stations, and the Chicago "L" and the Vancouver SkyTrain use tunnels to run through central areas.

== Economics ==
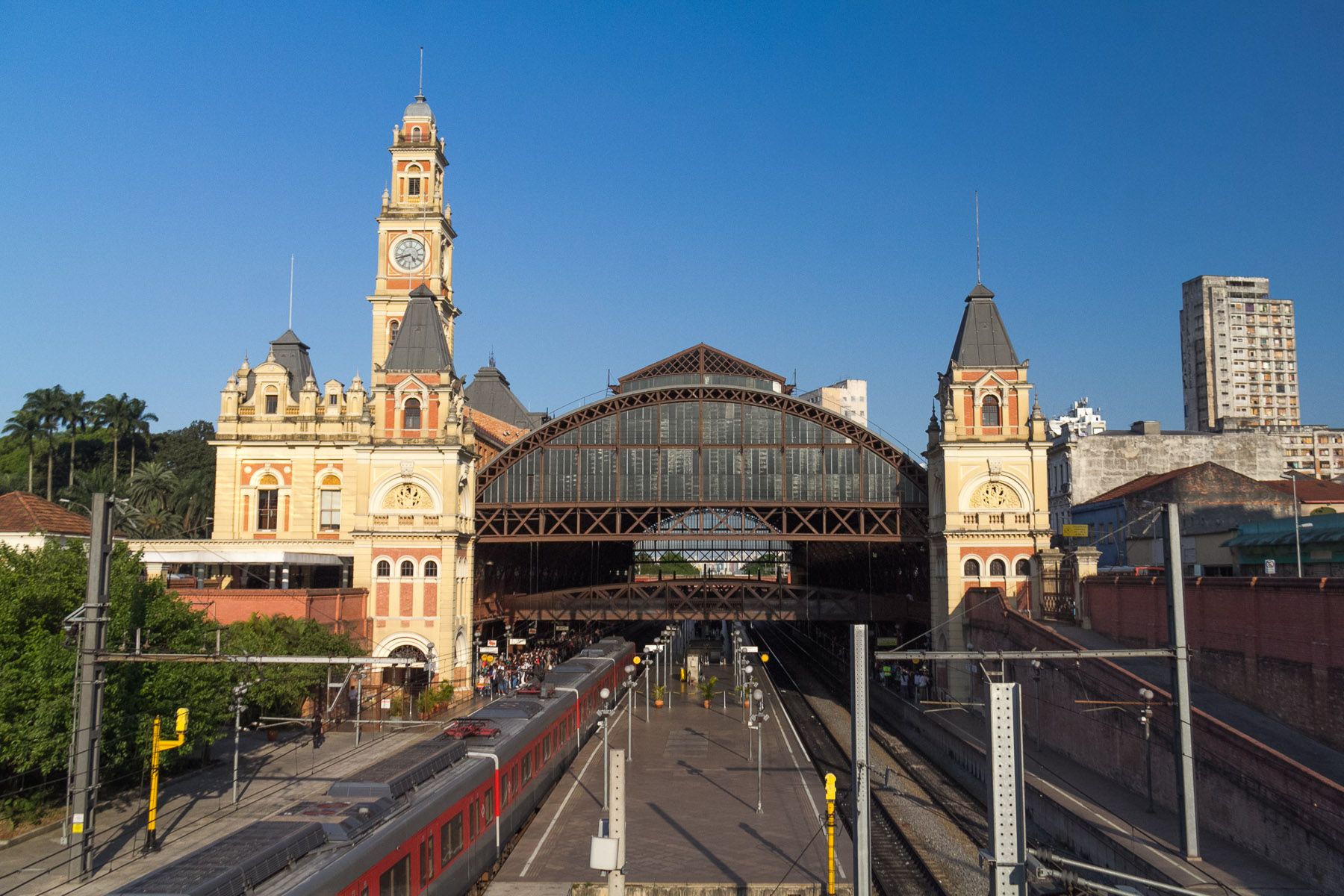
Luz Station in São Paulo, Brazil

In a 2006 article, the political scientist Ted Balaker and the urban planner Cecilia Juong Kim stated that public rail transit provides certain benefits for a community but also that the goals of policymakers are not often met. They also note some American economists claim that contrary to popular belief, rail transit has failed to improve the environment, serve the poor, or reduce highway congestion in the United States. They also claim economists are somewhat more optimistic about rail transit's impact on economic development.

== See also ==
- Passenger rail terminology
- List of tram and light rail transit systems
- List of town tramway systems
- Streetcars in North America
- List of North American light rail systems
- Tram-train#List of tram-train systems
- Medium-capacity rail system
- List of premetro systems
- List of metro systems
- List of semi-automatic train systems
- List of North American rapid transit systems
- List of rail transit systems in North America
- List of monorail systems
- List of suburban and commuter rail systems
- List of United States commuter rail systems
- List of funicular railways
- List of bus rapid transit systems
- List of trolleybus systems
- List of airport people mover systems
- Lists of urban rail transit systems
