= List of railroad bankruptcies in North America =

== 1870s ==
- September 1873 Panic of 1873—By November 1873, 55 US railroads fail. (Another 60 are bankrupt by September 1874).

== 1890s ==
- February 1893 Panic of 1893—The Philadelphia and Reading Railroad went bankrupt on February 20, 1893. Within the next year, more than 150 other railroads had followed, including the Atchison, Topeka and Santa Fe Railroad, Northern Pacific Railroad, Union Pacific Railroad, and almost every other railroad in the West other than the Great Northern Railway and Southern Pacific Railroad.

== 1910s ==
- April 20, 1915: Chicago, Rock Island and Pacific Railroad
- September 6, 1918: Canadian Northern Railway (nationalized)

== 1920s ==
- July 12, 1920: Grand Trunk Pacific Railway (nationalized)
- January 20, 1923: Grand Trunk Railway (nationalized)
- 1925: Chicago, Milwaukee, and St. Paul Railway

== 1930s ==
- December 4, 1931: Ann Arbor Railroad
- February 10, 1932: Baltimore and Virginia Steamboat Company
- March 31, 1933: Missouri Pacific Railroad
- June 7, 1933: Chicago, Rock Island and Pacific Railroad
- December 1934: Alleghany Corporation
- March 26, 1935: Copper Range Railroad
- June 29, 1935: Chicago, Milwaukee, St. Paul and Pacific Railroad
- October 23, 1935: New York, New Haven and Hartford Railroad
- October 31, 1935: Connecticut Company
- November 29, 1935: New York, Westchester and Boston Railway
- February 2, 1936: Van Sweringen Company
- June 3, 1936: Old Colony Railroad
- May 20, 1937: New York, Ontario and Western Railway
- January 18, 1938: Erie Railroad
- August 4, 1938: Boston and Providence Railroad
- October 30, 1939: Central Railroad of New Jersey

== 1940s ==
- 1947: American Railroad Company
- March 2, 1949: Long Island Rail Road

== 1950s ==
- November 19, 1954: Hudson and Manhattan Railroad
- March 29, 1957: New York, Ontario & Western Railway

== 1960s ==
- July 7, 1961: New York, New Haven and Hartford Railroad
- September 7, 1962: Boston Terminal Corporation (South Station)
- March 22, 1967: Central Railroad of New Jersey

== 1970s ==
- March 12, 1970: Boston and Maine Corporation
- June 21, 1970: Penn Central Transportation
- July 24, 1970: Lehigh Valley Railroad
- November 23, 1971: Reading Company
- April 19, 1972: Lehigh and Hudson River Railway
- June 26, 1972: Erie Lackawanna Railway
- July 12, 1973: United New Jersey Railroad and Canal Company (Penn Central subsidiary)
- July 14, 1973: Beech Creek Railroad; Cleveland, Cincinnati, Chicago and St. Louis Railway; Cleveland and Pittsburgh Railroad; Connecting Railway; Delaware Railroad; Erie and Pittsburgh Railroad; Michigan Central Railroad; Northern Central Railway; Penndel Company; Philadelphia and Trenton Railroad; Philadelphia, Baltimore and Washington Railroad; Pittsburgh, Fort Wayne and Chicago Railway; Pittsburgh, Youngstown and Ashtabula Railway; Union Railroad of Baltimore (Penn Central subsidiaries)
- October 15, 1973: Ann Arbor Railroad
- March 17, 1975: Chicago, Rock Island and Pacific Railroad
- December 19, 1977: Chicago, Milwaukee, St. Paul and Pacific Railroad

== 1980s ==
- June 20, 1988: Delaware and Hudson Railroad
