= Galveston Island Trolley =

Heritage streetcar in Galveston, Texas

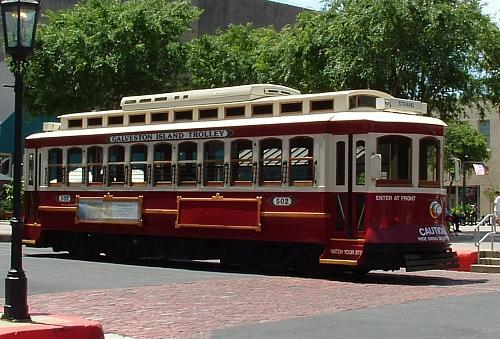

Overview
- Status: Operating
- Owner: City of Galveston
- Locale: Galveston, Texas
- Stations: 22
- Website: Island Transit

Service
- Type: Heritage streetcar
- Services: 1
- Operator: Island Transit
- Rolling stock: 4 Miner Railcar replica trolleys

History
- Opened: July 23, 1988
- Closed: September 2008
- Reopened: October 1, 2021

Technical
- Line length: 6.8 miles (10.9 km)
- Character: street-running
- Track gauge: 4 ft 8 1/2 in (1,435 mm)
- Electrification: none
Route map
Seawall Trolley highlighted in red
Rail Trolley highlighted in blue

The Galveston Island Trolley is a heritage streetcar network in Galveston, Texas, United States. As of late 2006, the total network length was 6.8 miles (10.9 km) with 22 stations. The Galveston Island Trolley is operated by Island Transit. The rail system reopened in 2021, after having been out of service for 13 years following severe damage caused by Hurricane Ike in 2008. Subsequent to the 2008 closure, the Federal Emergency Management Agency (FEMA) and the Federal Transit Administration agreed to fund repairs. In January 2017, a contract was approved to restore three of the trolleys at a cost of $3.8 million. At that time, the trolleys were expected to be ready to return to service in 2018, but the date was later postponed to 2019 and later to 2021. By November 2020, two reconditioned trolleys had returned to Galveston. The line reopened for service in October 2021, and runs five days per week.

== History ==
Galveston has had streetcars before. The first urban rail public transit system was introduced in 1868. The cars were pulled by mules. In 1891, electric trolleys were introduced. Galveston's first streetcar system closed on May 22, 1938.

Galveston Island Trolley, a heritage streetcar system, was opened on July 23, 1988. Barry Goodman Associates (now the Goodman Corporation) was a key consultant in the creation of the Trolley, leading the early design studies and helping to secure funding. The project was designed by HNTB, engineers, who were responsible for all aspects of track and vehicle design; Ochsner Associates, architects, who were responsible for the maintenance facility and the passenger shelter (on 20th Street).

Initially, the Galveston Island Trolley connected the historic Strand District on the north side of Galveston Island with the Seawall beach area. It was mainly used by tourists. In the 1990s, planning for an extension of the line began and was completed in 1995. A new branch to the University of Texas Medical Branch (UTMB) opened on March 14, 2005. This line was popular among UTMB staff, students and patients.

Service had been suspended in 2008 when the cars and tracks sustained heavy damage from Hurricane Ike. Substitute service with replica buses was later put into place during the restoration process of the rolling stock.

== Rolling stock ==
The Galveston Island Trolley cars look like vintage electric trolleys, but are actually modern-built and diesel-electric powered. Because of this there are no overhead wires, meaning the vehicles are not technically trolleys (since they do not "troll" for power from overhead wires) but rather streetcars.

The Galveston trolley fleet consists of four cars. All of them are identical, though they are painted in different colors. The cars were built by Miner Railcar, now known as Kasgro Rail Corporation, Pennsylvania. Each car can accommodate up to 80 passengers; 40 sitting and 40 standing. Cars are designed for an operational speed of 25 mph (40 km/h). Each car weighs 63,000 lb (29,000 kg).

In 2005, all cars were equipped with air conditioning.

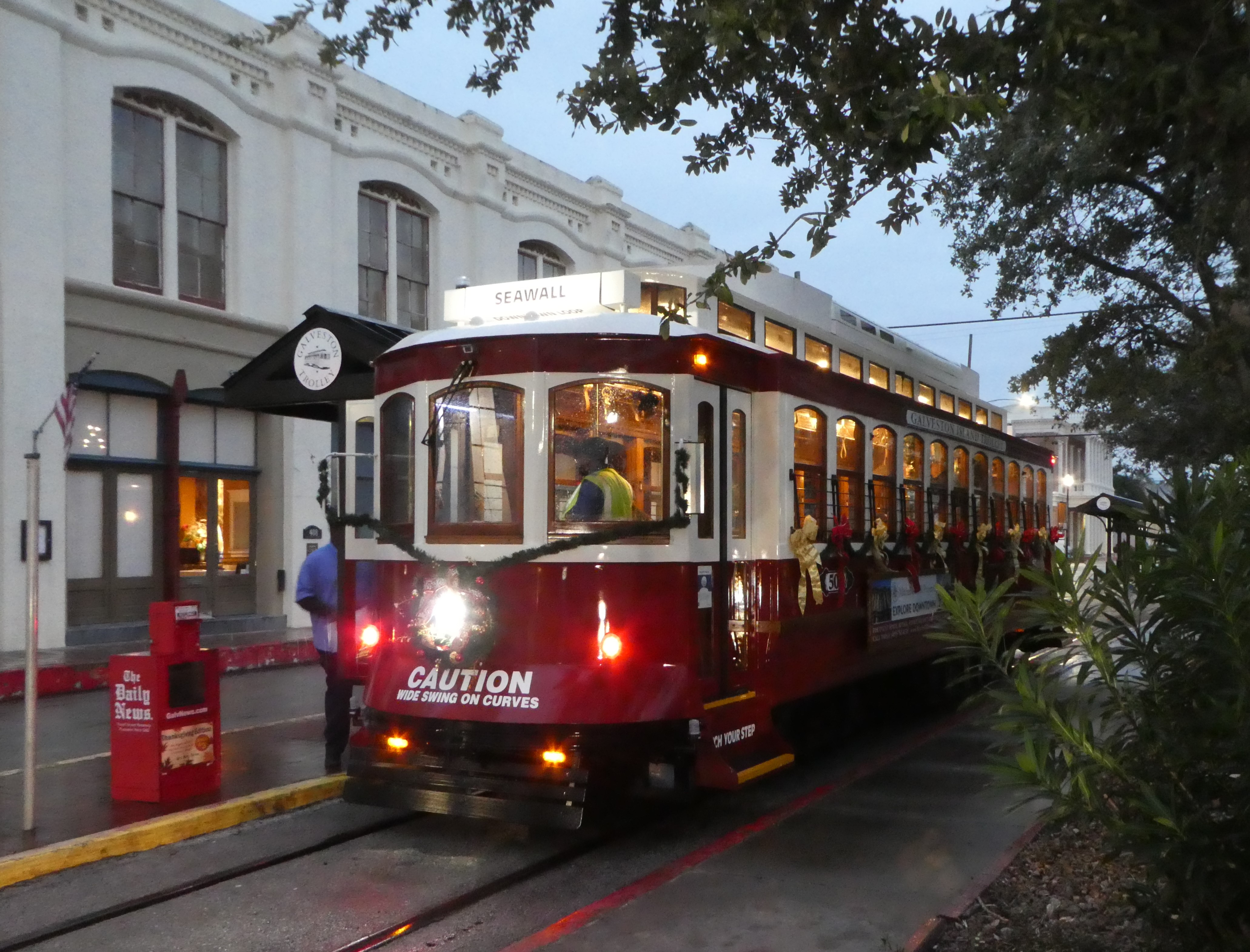
A streetcar decorated for the 2021 Christmas season

Between 2017 and 2021, in the last part of the 13-year suspension of all service, three of the four cars were extensively restored by the Gomaco Trolley Company. In November 2022, the city council approved a contract to repair car 503, the only car not covered by the earlier contract with Gomaco, and that car was refurbished by Gomaco in 2023 and returned to Galveston in early 2024, restoring the size of the working fleet back to four streetcars.

== Hours of operation ==
When trolley service was restarted on October 1, 2021, following the 13-year suspension, it was scheduled to run on Fridays, Saturdays and Sundays from 10:00 a.m. to 7:00 p.m. Trolley service has since been added on Wednesdays and Thursdays.

== Sources ==
- Jon Bell: Galveston Island Trolley
- Trams 2007 by B.A. Schenk and M.R. Van Den Toorn. Alk publishings, Netherlands, ISBN 90-6013-466-4 (book in Dutch)
- RPR Consulting: Galveston Island Trolley
