= Altamont Corridor Express =

Commuter rail service in Northern California

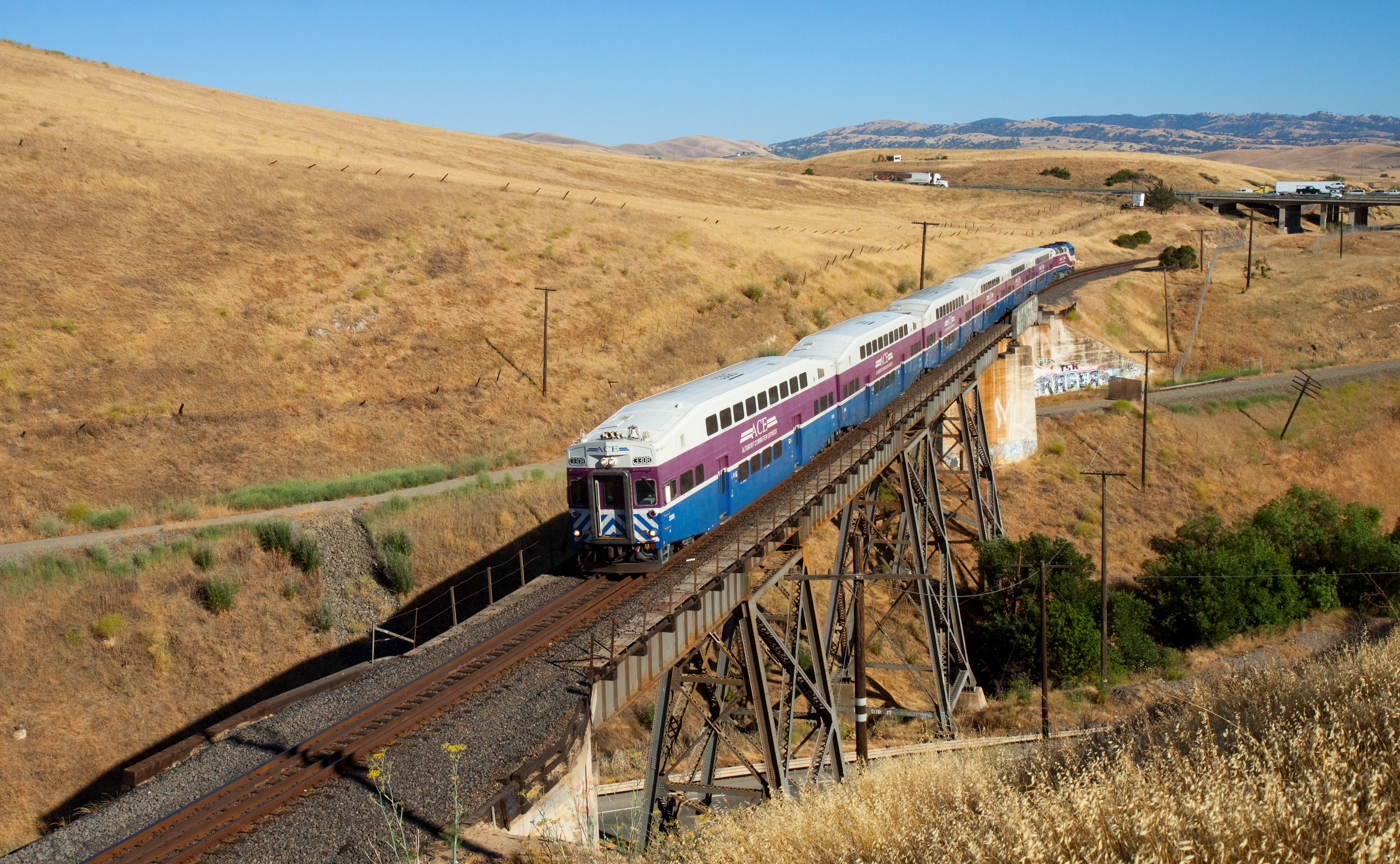
- ACE train climbing its namesake Altamont Pass in 2010

Overview
- Owner: San Joaquin Regional Rail Commission
- Area served: San Joaquin Valley, Tri-Valley and Silicon Valley
- Transit type: Commuter rail
- Number of stations: 10
- Daily ridership: 2,900 (weekdays, Q2 2026)
- Annual ridership: 763,800 (2025)
- Headquarters: Robert J. Cabral Station in Stockton, California
- Website: acerail.com

Operation
- Began operation: October 19, 1998
- Operator: Herzog Transit Services
- Reporting marks: ACEX
- Infrastructure managers: Union Pacific (Stockton–Santa Clara); Caltrain (Santa Clara–San Jose)
- Number of vehicles: 10 locomotives, 30 passenger cars
- Train length: 1–2 locomotives, 4–8 passenger cars

Technical
- System length: 85 mi (137 km)
- Track gauge: 4 ft 8 1/2 in (1,435 mm) standard gauge
- Average speed: 39 mph (63 km/h)
- Top speed: 79 mph (127 km/h)
System map
Altamont Corridor Express highlighted in purple

The Altamont Corridor Express (ACE) is a commuter rail service in California, connecting Stockton and San Jose during peak hours only. ACE is named for the Altamont Pass, through which it runs. Service is managed by the San Joaquin Regional Rail Commission, and operations are contracted to Herzog Transit Services. The 86-mile (138 km) route includes ten stops, with travel time about 2 hours and 12 minutes end-to-end. In 2025, the line had a ridership of 763,800, or about 2,900 per weekday as of the second quarter of 2026. ACE uses Bombardier BiLevel Coaches, MPI F40PH-3C locomotives, and Siemens Charger locomotives.

Altamont Commuter Express began on October 19, 1998, with two weekday round trips. A third round trip was added in May 2001, followed by a fourth round trip in October 2012. The service was rebranded as Altamont Corridor Express in 2012. Saturday service began in September 2019, but was suspended in March 2020 due to the outbreak of COVID-19. The tracks are owned by Union Pacific Railroad, previously built along the Western Pacific Railroad main line. Under the ACEforward program, a number of improvements to the service are being considered. These include a rerouted line through Tracy, an extension to Modesto and Merced, and connections to BART at Union City and Tri-Valley.

== History and funding ==
=== Planning ===
Former ACE logo, used until 2013

By the 1980s, three rapidly growing areas in California – Silicon Valley, the Tri-Valley, and the San Joaquin Valley – were poorly connected by public transit, as Interstate 580 and Interstate 680 became more congested. Commuting from the San Joaquin Valley or the Tri-Valley to Silicon Valley required using a car or limited bus service.

In 1989, the San Joaquin Council of Governments, Stockton Chamber of Commerce, and the Building Industry Association of the Delta started work on a 20-year transportation plan for the northern section of the San Joaquin Valley. In November 1990, San Joaquin County voters passed Measure K, a half-cent sales tax to fund a variety of transportation improvements. The highest-priority project was the establishment of passenger rail service to San Jose.

In 1995, San Joaquin County and seven cities along the route formed the San Joaquin Regional Rail Commission (SJRRC) to oversee the creation of the service. In May 1997, the Altamont Commuter Express Joint Powers Authority (ACE JPA) was formed by the SJRRC, Santa Clara Valley Transportation Authority (VTA), and Alameda Congestion Management Agency (ACMA). That agreement formalized financial support, administrative processes, and governance for the rail service. The operation is funded by a variety of state and federal sources, largely sales tax revenue collected by the three JPA signatories, while farebox revenues account for about one-third of costs.

Cost sharing for capital projects, excluding stations, during the initial 36 months of service was determined by the JPA on a case-by-case basis and approved by each of the member agencies. The initial purchase of rolling stock, construction of stations, and other start-up costs, amounting to some $48 million, were covered primarily by Measure K funds. Station improvements are the responsibility of the county in which the station is located. ACE pays the Union Pacific Railroad about $1.5 million per year to use their tracks. ACE trains also use about 4 miles (6.4 km) of Caltrain track in San Jose. Service began on October 19, 1998, with two daily round trips running to San Jose in the morning and Stockton in the evening. The service was named Altamont Commuter Express after the Altamont Pass through which it runs.

=== Service expansion ===
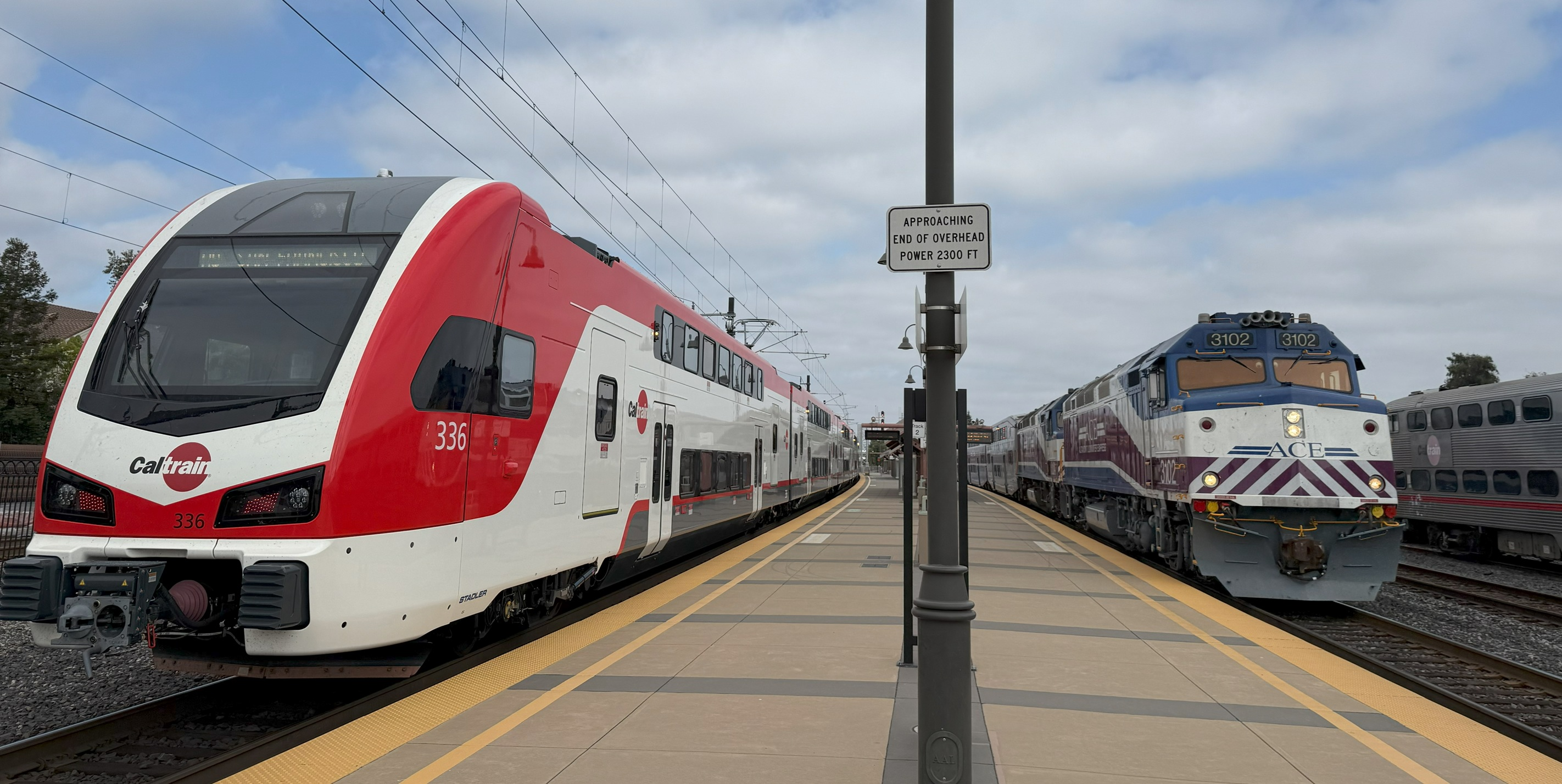
ACE service to Santa Clara station began in 2001, was suspended in 2005, and returned in 2012.

The original service used two trainsets, each with four bilevel coach cars, for a total seated capacity of 1,120 passengers in each direction daily. In September 1999, less than a year after opening, the service reached 1,000 daily riders per direction, near full capacity.

To enable more trains on the line, ACE funded $3 million in track improvements, but the limited amount of equipment allowed ACE to add only a morning "short turn" run between San Jose and Pleasanton. This "turn-back train" started service on February 21, 2000, and gave Pleasanton and Fremont a third inbound train to alleviate the crowding on the two earlier trains. Even with the added capacity, by early 2001 ACE was regularly carrying more than 700 daily standees.

ACE purchased additional equipment, allowing the "turn-back train" to operate to Lathrop/Manteca station – nearly the full length of the route – beginning on March 5, 2001. Trains also began stopping at Santa Clara station. Although the third train added 560 seats in each direction, it brought an immediate increase of 380 daily riders. ACE then planned to add a fourth round trip later in the year, with fifth and sixth round trips by 2006. However, by late 2001, the deepening dot-com recession was hurting ridership, and expansion plans were put on hold. On June 30, 2003, the ACE JPA was dissolved in favor of a Cooperative Services Agreement between the three member agencies.

On January 6, 2003, ACE introduced the Stockton Solution Shuttle, allowing Stockton passengers to use the ACE trip which terminated at Lathrop/Manteca. The rail trip was extended to Stockton on August 1, 2005. At that time, service to Santa Clara was suspended to allow for the construction of a second platform and pedestrian tunnel at the station.

On August 28, 2006, ACE added a fourth round trip, which operated midday using one of the existing trainsets. On November 7, 2006, San Joaquin County voters approved a 20-year extension of Measure K. Suffering from reduced funding due to the Great Recession, ACE cut the lightly used midday trip on November 2, 2009. On May 14, 2012, ACE restored service to Santa Clara station. On October 1, 2012, a fourth rush-hour round trip was added, running approximately one hour after existing trips.

=== Altamont Corridor Express ===
In December 2012, the service was rebranded from Altamont Commuter Express to Altamont Corridor Express to reflect plans for a broader scope of service. In March 2014, ACE opened a $65 million, 121,000-square-foot (11,200 m^{2}) maintenance facility in Stockton. On July 1, 2015, management and governance of the San Joaquin passed from Caltrans to the new San Joaquin Joint Powers Authority. The SJRRC continued to handle normal operation and administration. On March 7, 2016, an ACE train was derailed by a mudslide in Niles Canyon near Sunol. The front car plunged into the rain-swollen Alameda Creek. Fourteen passengers were injured, but there were no fatalities.

ACE received Road Repair and Accountability Act funds in January 2018 to begin Saturday service. Two Saturday round trips were added on September 7, 2019. Saturday service was suspended effective March 21, 2020, due to the COVID-19 pandemic. One weekday round trip was suspended on March 23 and another on April 6. One of the suspended weekday round trips returned on May 3, 2021, followed by the fourth round trip on September 7, 2021. On November 18, 2024, the latest evening eastbound train was replaced with a mid-afternoon train.

=== Future plans ===
==== ACEforward ====
In association with the California High-Speed Rail project, ACE developed plans to upgrade and expand service. Beginning around 2008, initial plans called for the Altamont Corridor Rail Project to produce a high speed rail, branded "Super ACE", capable of halving the travel time between San Jose and Stockton.

As the high-speed rail project was scaled back and rerouted to Pacheco Pass several years later, these plans were replaced with the more modest ACEforward program. The San Joaquin Regional Rail Commission issued a notice of intent to proceed with an Environmental Impact Statement in June 2013; this was released in 2017 and prioritized goals as either long term or short term. Short term goals included track improvements, a possible reroute through downtown Tracy including new stations, a West Tracy station, and a new extension to Modesto in addition to additional daily round trips. Long term goals included upgrades to the existing corridor to allow as many as 10 daily round trips, an extension to Merced, and the electrification of the line between Stockton and San Jose.

Also studied were possible connections with BART at Union City or the Tri-Valley via traditional ACE rail, diesel multiple units, or bus bridges. This connection is planned to be facilitated by the Tri-Valley–San Joaquin Valley Regional Rail Authority.

The California state senate allocated $400 million in revenue from a gas tax increase to ACEforward expansion. By 2019, the plan had come to be called the Altamont Corridor Vision, with an expected price of $9.7 billion, allowing ACE to run up to six weekday round trips in 2023 with the goal of ten weekday round trips once additional track infrastructure is completed. ACE and the Tri-Valley–San Joaquin Valley Regional Rail Authority sought funding to construct a shared tunnel under Altamont pass in order to speed service and increase reliability.

==== Valley Rail ====
Schematic routemap, approximately to scale, with Merced and Sacramento extensions planned under Valley Rail project. Amtrak San Joaquins are now known as Gold Runner.

However, during the development of ACEforward, significant financial and logistical challenges to expanding service on the existing route between Stockton and San Jose were identified, and further work on the project was halted in favor of a new Valley Rail project, focusing initially on the eastern expansion to serve commuters living in the Central Valley. ACE was awarded $500.5 million in April 2018 for expanded service to Ceres and Sacramento to provide more rail service and connections within the Central Valley. Service was originally expected to begin from Ceres by 2023 with interim bus bridge service to Merced until that segment of Union Pacific right-of-way is upgraded. Four trains will depart Ceres in the mornings, and one train may make the complete run to San Jose with others transferring passengers at North Lathrop.

The Union Pacific right of way between Ceres and Lathrop will be double tracked to facilitate passenger service. As of 2019 platforms are being extended to accommodate longer trains.

Valley Rail also includes a project segment to route ACE and Amtrak Gold Runner along the little-used Sacramento Subdivision between Stockton and Sacramento. Six new stations would be constructed along the line with a layover facility at Natomas. Trains would run the length of the line from Natomas to San Jose or Ceres with a midday short turn to Stockton. A Draft Environmental Impact Statement was released in 2020, with services expected to begin no later than 2023. The North Elk Grove station was eliminated from planning in September 2020. The project received funding via California's Transit and Intercity Rail Capital Program in 2023, by which time the project was expected to open in phases beginning in 2025. Later that year, the estimated commencement of service to Ceres and Natomas were again pushed back to 2026, with service to Merced and infill stations opening by 2030.

== Service ==
As of 2025, ACE operates four round trips per weekday in the peak rush hour directions – westbound (to San Jose) in the morning and eastbound (to Stockton) in the evening. Trains are scheduled to make the 85-mile (137 km) one-way trip in 2 hours 12 minutes, at an average speed of 39 miles per hour (63 km/h). Special trains serve events at Levi's Stadium. ACE does not operate on weekends or major holidays.

=== Route ===
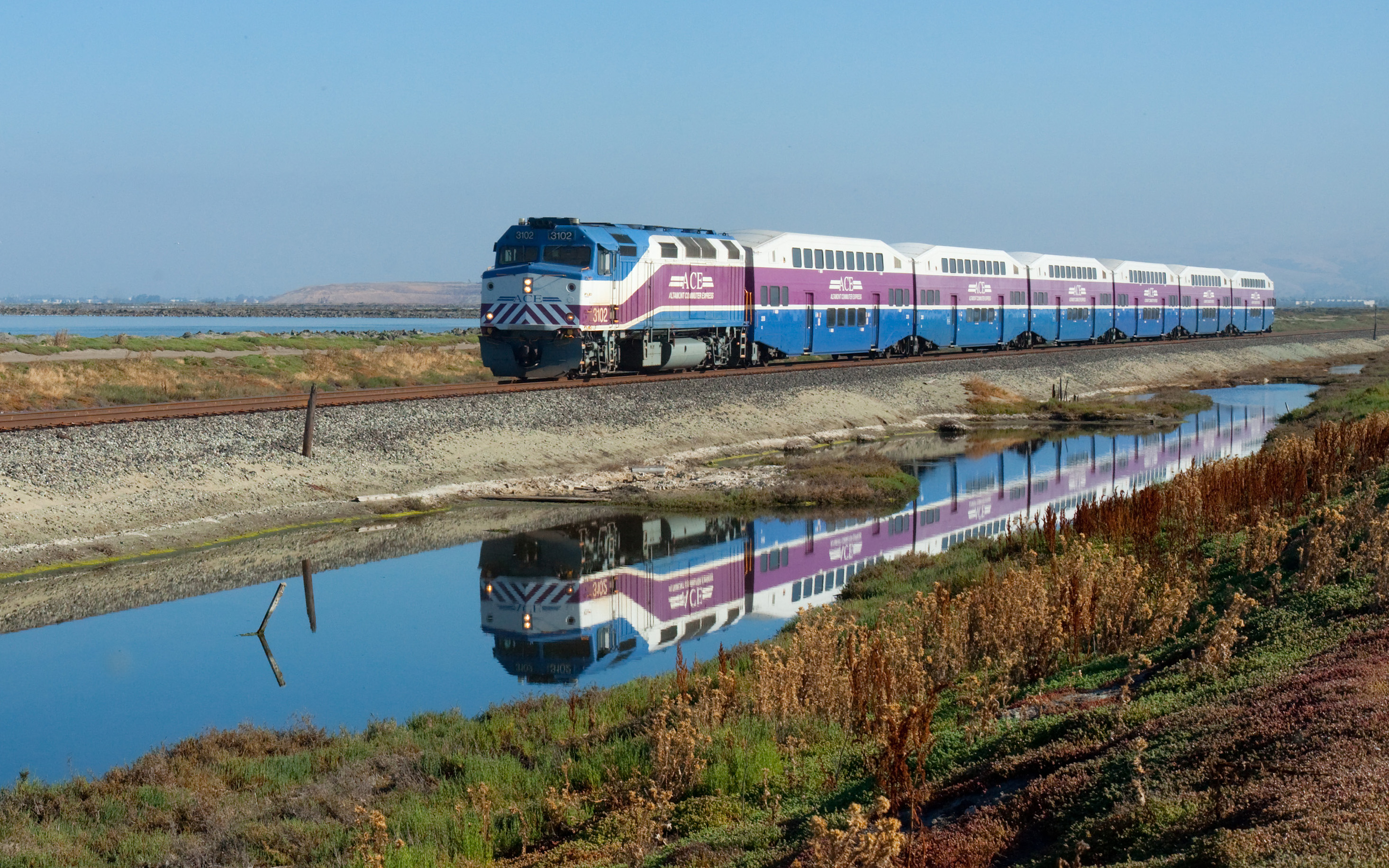
Altamont Corridor Express train crossing the San Francisco Bay National Wildlife Refuge between Fremont and San Jose

From San Jose to just north of Santa Clara, ACE uses the Caltrain main line (Peninsula Subdivision), shared with Caltrain and Amtrak service. From Santa Clara to Stockton – the majority of the route – ACE runs on Union Pacific Railroad freight lines. From Santa Clara to Newark, ACE uses the Coast Subdivision, then the Niles Subdivision to Niles. From Niles to Lathrop, the line uses the Oakland Subdivision. From Lathrop to Stockton, the line uses the Fresno Subdivision.

The route runs through Niles Canyon, parallel to the Niles Canyon Railway, Highway 84, and the Hetch Hetchy Aqueduct. The line passes through a 0.75-mile (1.21 km) long tunnel which cuts off one of the canyon's horseshoes. This tunnel was modified from its original configuration to accommodate intermodal double-stack freight trains. However, this left the track in poor condition, reducing speeds from 45 mph (72 km/h) to 25 mph (40 km/h) in the summer and as low as 10 mph (16 km/h) during the rainy season. The San Joaquin Regional Rail Commission plans to rehabilitate the tunnel.

East of Pleasanton and Livermore, the line runs through the Altamont Pass on the original Feather River Route. After crossing the California Aqueduct and the Delta-Mendota Canal into the Central Valley, skirting the southern edge of Tracy. It then turns north between Lathrop and Manteca and runs to Robert J. Cabral Station in Stockton.

=== Stations ===
Station	Image	Location	Connections
Stockton (Robert J. Cabral)	The arch sign at Robert J. Cabral Station in Stockton	Stockton	Amtrak: Gold Runner; Amtrak Thruway, San Joaquin RTD
Lathrop/Manteca	The platform at Lathrop/Manteca station	Lathrop	StanRTA
Tracy	The platform at Tracy station	Tracy	Tracer
Vasco Road	The platform at Vasco Road station	Livermore	WHEELS
Livermore	An eastbound train leaving Livermore station	Livermore	Amtrak Thruway, WHEELS
Pleasanton	An eastbound train leaving Pleasanton station	Pleasanton	WHEELS
Fremont	Platforms at Fremont station	Fremont	Amtrak: Capitol Corridor; AC Transit
Great America	The platform at Great America station	Santa Clara	Amtrak: Capitol Corridor; VTA: Green Line, Orange Line (at Lick Mill); VTA Bus
Santa Clara	ACE train at Santa Clara station	Santa Clara	Caltrain: Local, Limited, Weekend Local; Amtrak: Capitol Corridor; : VTA Bus
San Jose (Diridon)	The San Jose Diridon station building	San Jose	Caltrain: Express, Local, Limited, Weekend Local, South County Connector; Amtrak: Coast Starlight, Capitol Corridor; VTA: Green Line; Amtrak Thruway, Greyhound, Highway 17 Express, Megabus, VTA Bus

=== Tickets and fares ===
ACE fares are distance-based and available in one-way, round trip, 10 trip, 20 trip, and monthly passes. Unlike many of the other commuter rail services on the West Coast, ACE does not have ticket machines at stations. Passengers are encouraged to use the railroad's mobile ticketing app, but paper tickets can be purchased from agents at all stations except Vasco Road and the Santa Clara Transit Center. Also, unlike many other transit services in the Bay Area, ACE does not accept the Clipper Card.

== Rolling stock ==
ACE operates push-pull trains with one to two diesel locomotives and four to eight bilevel coach cars. Trains typically operate with the locomotive(s) leading westbound and the cab car leading eastbound.

ACE has ordered 17 additional Bombardier BiLevel cars (5 cab cars and 12 coaches). Deliveries were expected to begin sometime in 2021. The entire fleet of Bombardier bilevel coach cars and MPI F40PH-3C locomotives will be rebuilt, overhauled, and repainted to have a matching paint. They will then continue to operate along with the newer Siemens Charger SC-44 locomotives, which entered service in 2020.

Model	Quantity	Number	Notes	Image
MPI F40PH-3C	6	3101–3106	3101–3103 were built in Nov.-Dec. 1997, 3104–3105 were built in Aug. 2000, and 3106, the last F40PH built, was built in Dec. 2006. 3101 and 3106 are currently in storage, while the rest are in service.	
Siemens Charger SC-44	6	3110–3115		
Bombardier BiLevel VI coach	22	3201–3222		
Bombardier BiLevel VI cab car	9	3301–3308	3309 was wrecked in a 2016 accident in Niles Canyon and was rebuilt into a coach numbered 3222.	
Bombardier BiLevel IX coach	12	3223–3228 (delivered cars)	Deliveries started mid 2022	
Bombardier BiLevel IX cab car	5	3310–3314	Deliveries started mid 2022	
