= Island Transit (Texas) =

Public transit company in Galveston, Texas, US

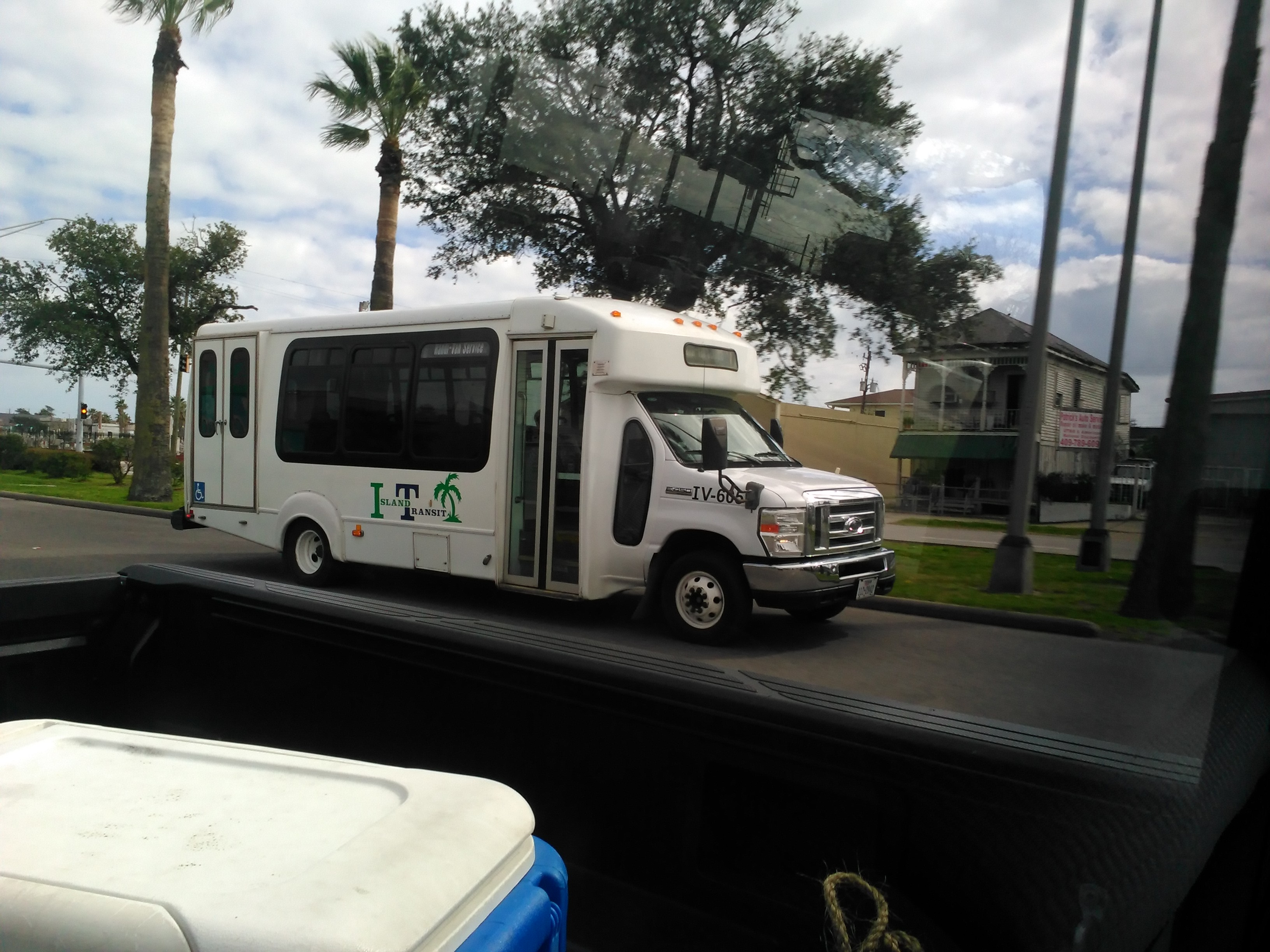
An Island Transit vehicle

Island Transit is a public transit company operating in Galveston, Texas. The company runs bus routes and a streetcar system called Galveston Island Trolley.

The system was started in 1893, with its streetcar system. The Federal Emergency Management Agency (FEMA) and the Federal Transit Authority have agreed to fund the repair of the rail cars, that were damaged in Hurricane Ike.

== Bus routes ==
- 1 71st St via Market/Broadway
- 2 UTMB/Ferry Rd
