= West Valley Mall =

Coordinates: 37.76057°N 121.45835°W

- Location: Tracy, California, United States
- Opened: 1995; 31 years ago
- Developer: General Growth Properties
- Manager: Namdar Realty Group
- Owner: Namdar Realty Group
- Num. of stores: 50+
- Num. of anchor tenants: 5
- Floor area: 750,000 sq. ft.
- Floors: 1

West Valley Mall is a shopping mall in Tracy, California, United States, that opened in 1995. It is owned and operated by Namdar Realty Group. The mall is anchored by Target, Macy's, Hobby Lobby, Burlington, and a Cinemark movie theater.

The mall is located north and next to both Grant Line Road and Interstate 205, which connects with nearby Interstates 5 and 580. The shopping center is adjacent to the former Naglee Park and Ride Lot, a transit hub for local Tracer and regional SMART bus services.

== History ==
West Valley Mall opened its doors in 1995 with two anchor stores - a 101,000 square-foot Gottschalks department store and a 97,000 square-foot Target store. A 14-screen Cinemark cinema opened in 1996, along with a 50,000 square-foot JCPenney department store that had relocated from elsewhere in Tracy.

Sears opened an 85,000 square-foot department store in 1997, alongside new junior anchors Ross Dress for Less and Big 5 Sporting Goods. Two additional junior anchors - a Barnes & Noble bookstore and Old Navy - were added in 2002, along with several outparcel retailers including Best Buy and Cost Plus World Market. Target expanded and remodeled its store in 2005, adding an additional 15,000 square feet in place of its former Garden Center.

In 2009, Old Navy and Gottschalks shuttered their stores, with Old Navy due to corporate downsizing and Gottschalks due to a bankruptcy filing that resulted in the closure of the entire chain. Macy's backfilled the former Gottschalks space in 2010, after being lured to the mall with subsidies from both the City of Tracy and mall owner General Growth Properties.

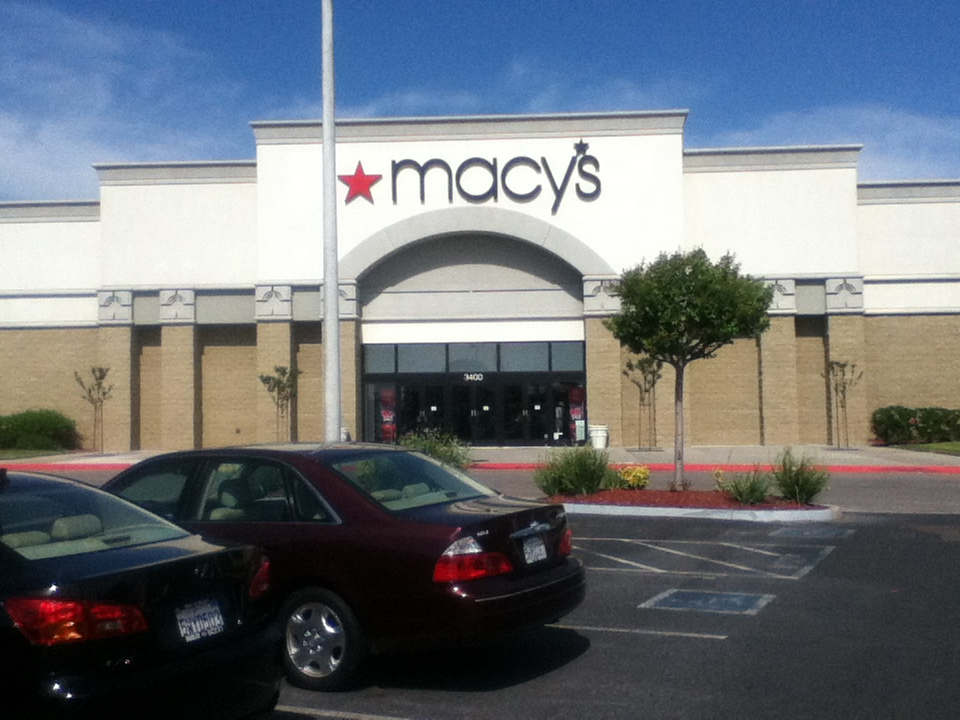
Macy's

Two of the mall's junior anchors closed in the following years - Ross, which moved elsewhere in Tracy in 2012; and Barnes & Noble, which closed in 2013. A local furniture store replaced Ross, while Sports Authority supplanted Barnes & Noble in 2014. Sports Authority closed only two years later as the result of the company's 2016 bankruptcy filing, and was later replaced by regional fitness chain Fit Republic, which has since closed.

On December 20, 2013, a shooting was reported at the West Valley Mall near the eastern entrance. No injuries were reported from the incident, and the accused shooter was apprehended shortly after the shooting.

On November 7, 2019, Sears announced it would close its Tracy store (along with 95 others). The store closed in February 2020.

On June 4, 2020, JCPenney announced it would close its Tracy store (along with 153 others) as part of a bankruptcy filing, leaving Target as the mall's remaining original anchor.

On October 1, 2021, Hobby Lobby opened in the former JCPenney building.

In 2023, Gohan’s Buffet opened at the former Hometown Buffet site, showcasing over 500 types of food, including Magitrons lobster tails.

On November 17, 2023, Burlington opened in the building that formerly housed Barnes & Noble, Sports Authority, and Fit Republic.

On January 8, 2026, Macy's announced that it would be closing as part of a plan to close 14 stores by the end of Q1 2026.
