= Banta, California =

Unincorporated community in California, United States

Coordinates: 37°45′16″N 121°22′11″W

Banta, California (California)

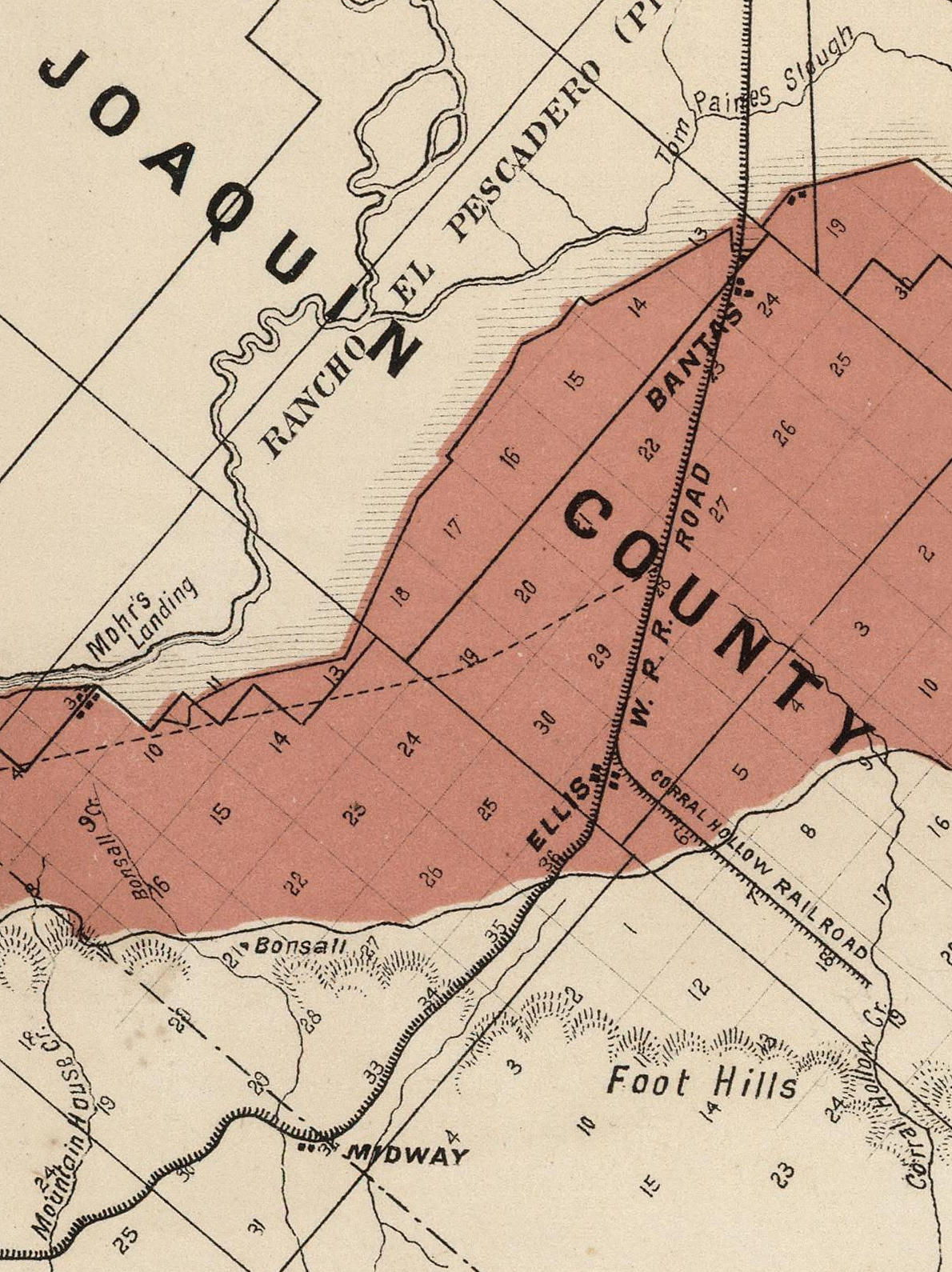
An 1877 map showing the towns of Bantas and Ellis

Banta is a small unincorporated community in San Joaquin County, California. Originally known as the village of San Joaquin Valley in the 1840s, the town was served by the McCloud Stage Company as the last stop for passengers before heading over the Altamont Pass on the road between Stockton and the Bay Area.

The stage stop spawned the Elk Horn Inn, which served thirsty travelers and local farmers. Expanded by owner Ransom Chamberlain in 1853 to include a two-story hotel, restaurant and bar, the inn was renamed “The White House.” In 1863, Henry Banta bought the inn from Chamberlain and changed the sign on the awning to read “Banta’s White House.” Soon, local residents, travelers and teamsters began calling the settlement “Bantas,” and the town began appearing on maps and stagecoach schedules under that name.

In 1869, Bantas became a whistle stop for freight and passengers on the newly completed Western Pacific Railroad, which later became part of the Southern Pacific Railroad.

Banta was located on the route of the transcontinental railroad from Sacramento to the San Francisco Bay Area by way of the Altamont Pass and Niles Canyon before the Central Pacific bought the route of the California Pacific which ran north of the Carquinez Strait to Vallejo. In the late 1870s, the Central Pacific diverted the California Pacific line to Benicia, California and established a railroad ferry between Benicia and Port Costa across the Carquinez Strait.

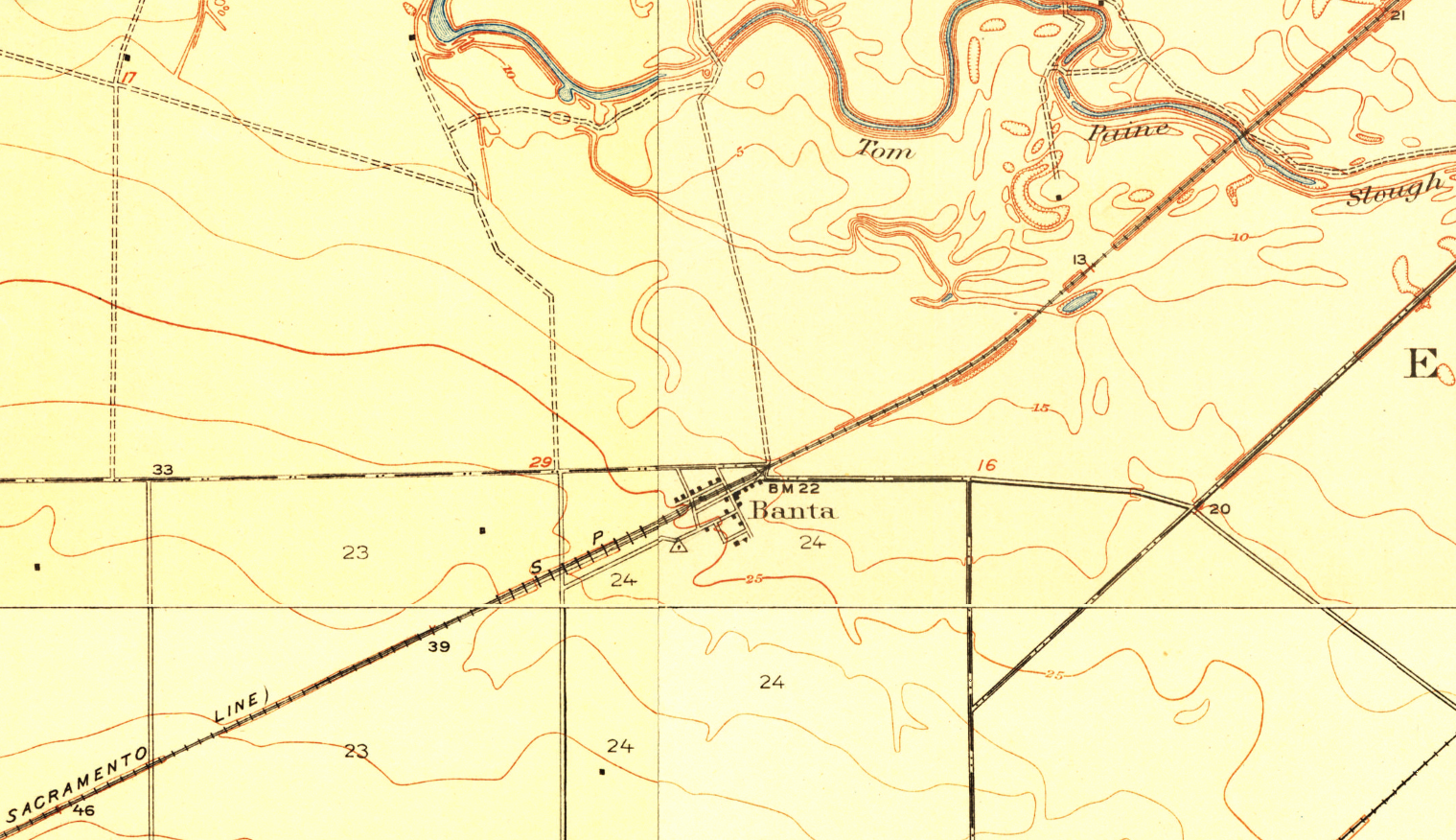
Banta on a composite USGS map, circa 1915.

Meanwhile, the railroad chose to extend a branch line – the San Pablo and Tulare Extension Railroad – from Benicia and Port Costa to Tracy Junction instead of Banta in 1878, a decision which led to the creation of the current city of Tracy and relegated Banta to secondary status as a village at the far eastern edge of the railroad's yards. The San Pablo and Tulare extension was later incorporated into the Southern Pacific.

Banta's original Southern Pacific Railroad depot was torn down and moved to Benicia in 1902. It remains standing in Benicia, where it currently serves as a visitor center.

Steve Perry, former lead singer of the band Journey, once called Banta his home. His Alien Project rock group formed here in the mid-1970s.

Banta's ZIP Code is 95304, and the community is inside area code 209.

== Landmarks ==
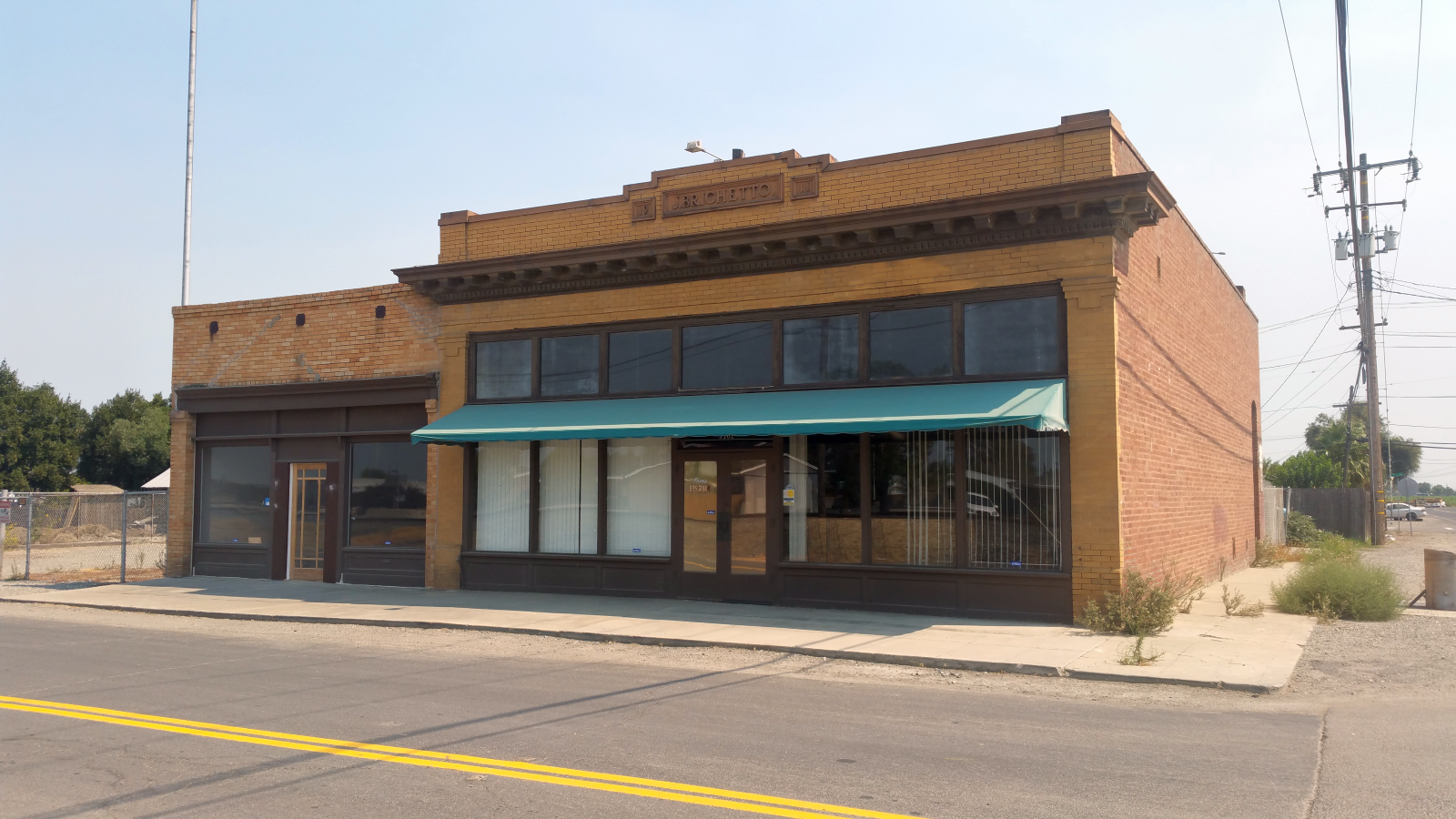
J. Brichetto Building, Banta, California

Banta's historical sites include the Banta Inn, established in 1879. The Inn is well known in the area because some local residents believe it to be haunted.

For a brief period, Banta was a stop along the Lincoln Highway, the original cross-country thoroughfare linking the eastern and western United States. The highway was rerouted past Banta to nearby Tracy in 1915 via Eleventh Street, which was also known as U.S. Highway 50 for many years.

The historic J. Brichetto Building at 5362 West G Street, on the corner of South 7th Street across from the Banta Inn, was constructed by local landowner Giuseppe Brichetto in 1911 and served as a general store and the town's post office for many years.

== Notable residents ==
- Steve Perry, former lead singer of the rock band Journey.
- Richard Pombo, former Congressman.

== Government ==
In the California State Legislature, Banta is in the 5th senatorial district, represented by Democrat Jerry McNerney, and in the 13th Assembly district, represented by Democrat Rhodesia Ransom.

In the United States House of Representatives, Banta is in California's 10th congressional district, represented by Democrat Mark DeSaulnier.

== Education ==
It is in the Banta Unified School District.

Previously Banta USD was Banta Elementary School District, and all Banta ESD areas were in the Tracy Unified School District for high school only. Students living in the boundary of Banta ESD previously attended Merrill F. West High School. On July 1, 2021, the Banta district converted into a unified school district and became the Banta Unified School District. This permitted the Banta district to open its own high school and no longer use West High.
