= Tracy Transit Center =

Bus station in Tracy, California, U.S.

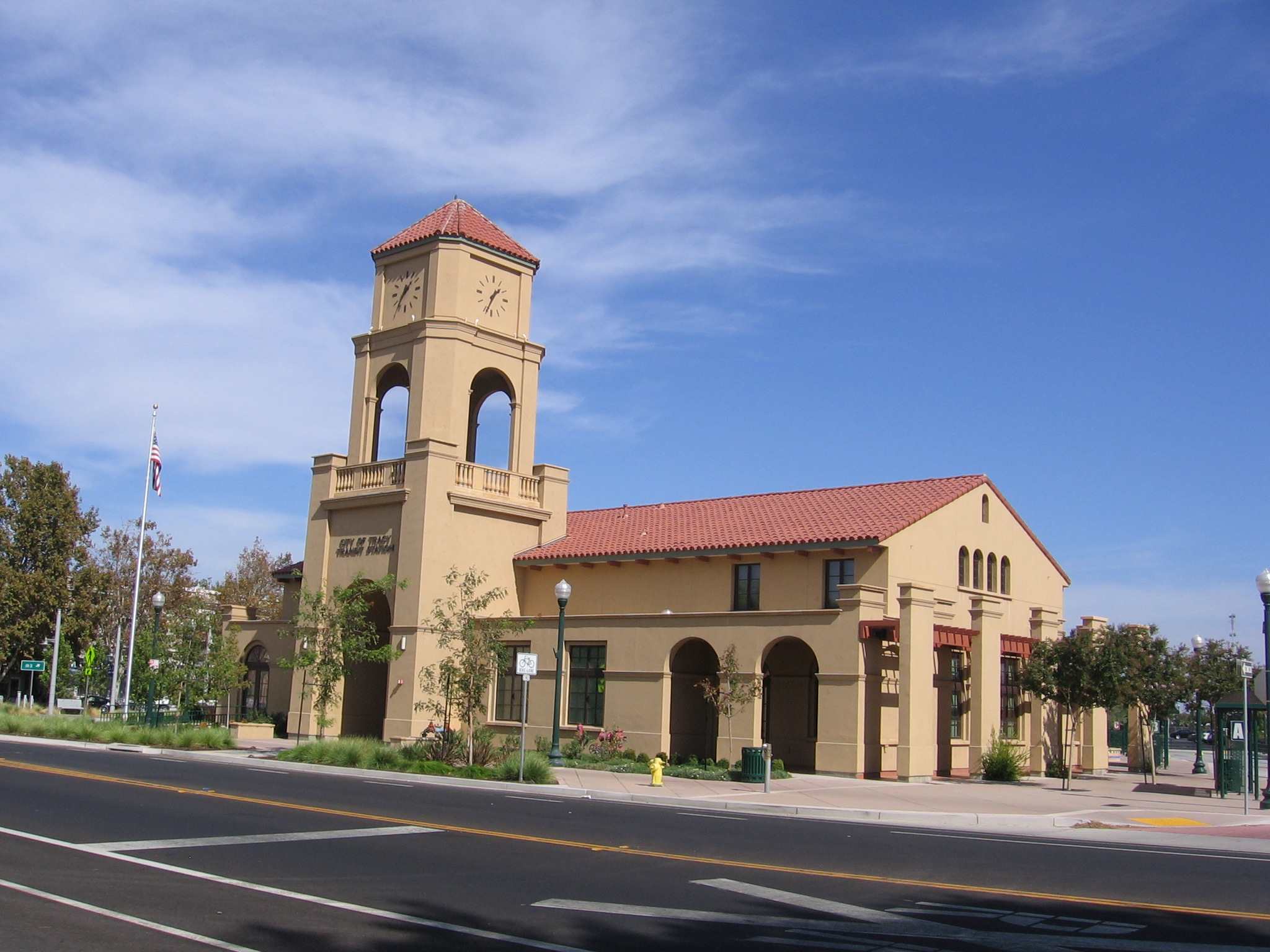
- The Tracy Transit Center in 2012

General information
- Location: 50 East Sixth Street; Tracy, California; United States
- Coordinates: 37.73473°N 121.42364°W
- Bus operators: Tracer; Greyhound Lines

Construction
- Parking: 220 free spaces
- Cycle facilities: Yes
- Accessible: Yes

History
- Opened: February 1, 2010

Planned services
Preceding station	Valley Link	Following station
Mountain House Community toward Dublin/Pleasanton	Possible future phase Proposed	River Islands toward North Lathrop
Location

The Tracy Transit Center is a bus station in Tracy, California, United States. The facility serves as a bus hub for transportation on local, commuter, and long-distance bus services. It also replaced the Naglee Park and Ride Lot "as the place for people to meet buses and vanpools" when the Naglee lot was sold for development in spring 2017, "after the city’s negotiations with several shopping centers near Interstate 205 proved unsuccessful."

Tracer and taxi services offer local connections. Greyhound Lines also provides bus service to the transit center. Parking is offered for both bikes and vehicles and there are bus shelters and stops for transit. Although located in very close proximity to railroad tracks, there is currently no rail service to the transit center; Valley Link service is proposed to stop at a newly constructed train platform adjacent to the station.

While service may have been previously provided at the transit center, as of July 2013 Amtrak Thruway only has two stops in Tracy (at the Tracy Altamont Corridor Express station and a Wendy's restaurant), but not at the Tracy Transit Center.
