= Amini Silatolu =

American football player (born 1988)

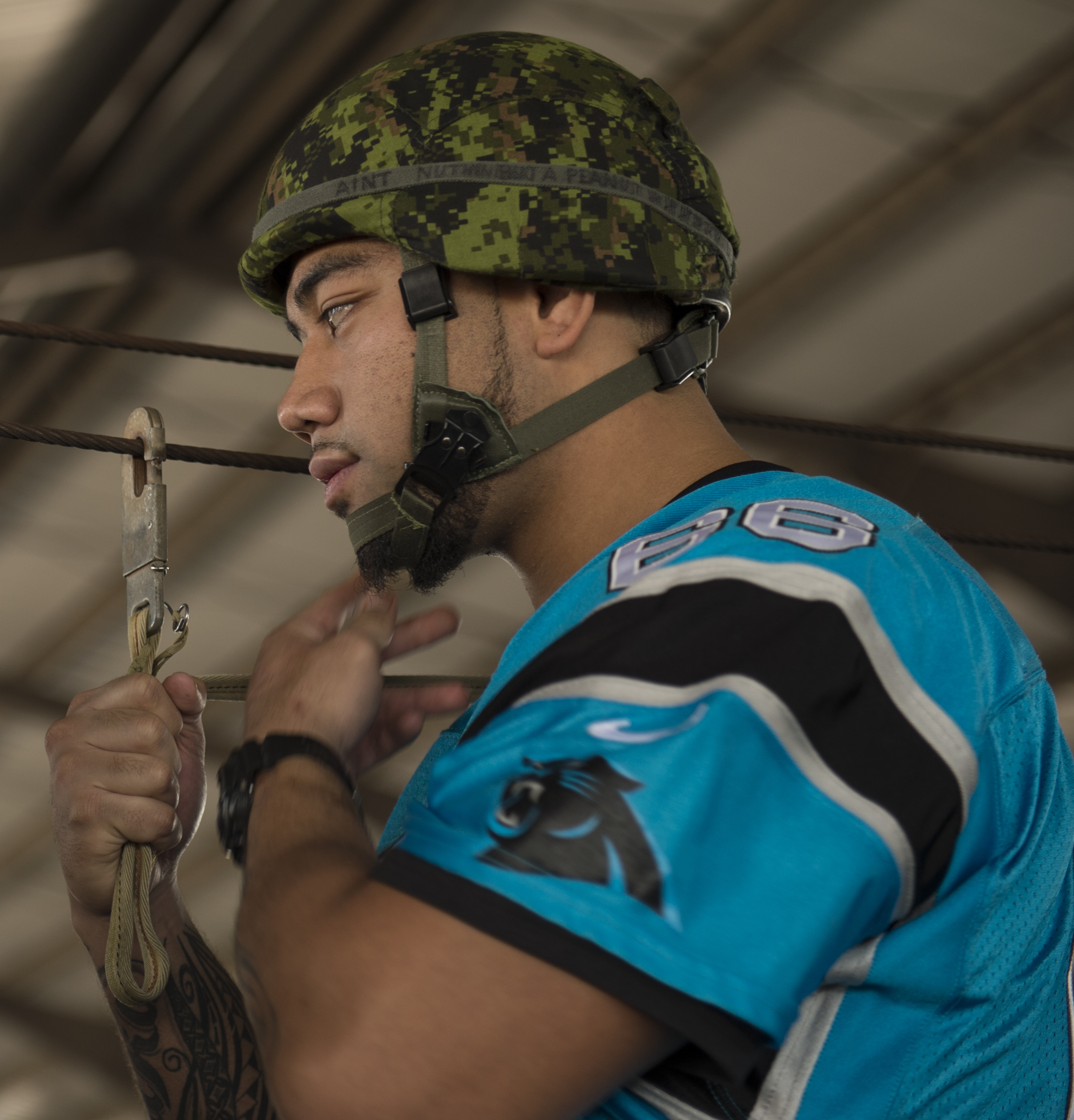
- Silatolu with the Carolina Panthers in 2013

No. 61, 66, 65
- Position: Offensive guard

Personal information
- Born: September 16, 1988 (age 38); Redwood City, California, U.S.
- Listed height: 6 ft 4 in (1.93 m)
- Listed weight: 305 lb (138 kg)

Career information
- High school: Merrill F. West (Tracy, California)
- College: San Joaquin Delta (2007–2008); Nevada (2009); Midwestern State (2010–2011)
- NFL draft: 2012: 2nd round, 40th overall pick

Career history
- Carolina Panthers (2012–2015); Chicago Bears (2016)*; Carolina Panthers (2017–2018)
- * Offseason or practice squad member only

Awards and highlights
- PFWA All-Rookie Team (2012); AP Little All American First Team (2011); AFCA Division II All American First Team (2011); Lone Star Conference Lineman of the Year (2011); All-Lone Star Conference First Team (2011); AP Little All American Second Team (2010); AFCA Division II All American First Team (2010); Lone Star Conference South Division Co-Offensive Lineman of the Year (2010); All-Lone Star Conference South Division First Team (2010)

Career NFL statistics
- Games played: 54
- Games started: 31
- Stats at Pro Football Reference

Aminiasi Silatolu (born September 16, 1988) is an American former professional football player who was an offensive guard in the National Football League (NFL). He played college football for the Midwestern State Mustangs from 2010 to 2011. He was selected by the Carolina Panthers in the second round of the 2012 NFL draft.

== Early life ==
A native of Redwood City, California, Silatolu attended Merrill F. West High School in Tracy, California, where he was a lineman on both sides of the ball. The 2005 team went to the Sac-Joaquin Section Division I championship game and finished as runner-up, and in 2006 they got as far as the section semifinals. Silatolu was not recognized by any recruiting service.

== College career ==
After graduating from high school in 2007, Silatolu took the junior college route to San Joaquin Delta College, where he was a heralded offensive tackle. After starting nine of ten games at left tackle as a freshman, he had a dominant sophomore season earning California Community College Coaches' Association first-team All-America, first-team Region II All-California and first-team All-Valley Conference honors in addition to capturing All-Valley Conference Offensive Lineman of the Year. Despite his accomplishments, Silatolu was regarded as only a two-star recruit by both Rivals.com and Scout.com. He drew interest from California, Hawaii, San Jose State, and Tennessee, before signing with Nevada. However, he did not qualify academically and had to sit out the 2009 season.

Silatolu transferred to Division II Midwestern State, where he dominated the competition with his aggressive play, and was a two-time All-American in 2010 and 2011. Protecting the blind side of quarterback Zack Eskridge, Silatolu draw the attention of NFL scouts. He delivered 182 knockdowns and 43 touchdown-resulting blocks, and allowed just one-half sack and one quarterback pressure in 560 pass plays. He was selected as the Lone Star Conference Offensive Lineman of the Year both of his seasons at MSU, and in 2011 finished as runner-up in voting for the Gene Upshaw Award, which is presented to the nation's top Division II lineman. He was invited to participate in the 2012 Senior Bowl—the first MSU player to ever receive an invitation—but was unable to play due to an injury. Besides Rishaw Johnson, Silatolu was the only D-II player invited to the 2012 Senior Bowl.

== Professional career ==
=== Pre-draft ===
Projected as a late-first to second-round prospect, Silatolu was considered one of the top offensive linemen available in the 2012 NFL draft, and drew comparisons to Jahri Evans.

Pre-draft measurables
Height	Weight	Arm length	Hand span	Wingspan	40-yard dash	10-yard split	20-yard split	20-yard shuttle	Three-cone drill	Vertical jump	Broad jump	Bench press
6 ft 3 5/8 in (1.92 m)	311 lb (141 kg)	33 in (0.84 m)	10 1/8 in (0.26 m)	6 ft 7 in (2.01 m)	5.43 s	1.86 s	3.08 s	4.87 s	7.95 s	32.0 in (0.81 m)	9 ft 2 in (2.79 m)	28 reps
All values from NFL Combine/Pro Day

=== Carolina Panthers (first stint) ===
Silatolu was selected in the second round with the 40th overall pick by the Carolina Panthers, the first Midwestern State player ever selected in the 2012 NFL draft. He is the highest-selected offensive lineman from Division II since Jermane Mayberry in 1996, and the highest-selected player from the Lone Star Conference since Mayberry. Silatolu, Mayberry, and Gene Upshaw are the only offensive linemen from LSC teams ever selected in the first two rounds.

Silatolu was the first interior lineman selected in the first two rounds by the Panthers since Ryan Kalil in 2007 NFL draft. On May 11, 2012, Silatolu was signed by the Panthers to a four-year contract worth $4.9 million that included a $2 million signing bonus. He started the first 15 games for the Panthers at left guard, before dislocating his wrist in a game against the Oakland Raiders. For his solid rookie season he was named to Pro Football Weekly′s 2012 All-Rookie team. On October 16, 2013, Silatolu was placed on injured reserve for a torn right ACL. On November 25, 2015, he was placed on injured reserve for a torn left ACL.

On February 7, 2016, Silatolu's Panthers played in Super Bowl 50. In the game, the Panthers fell to the Denver Broncos by a score of 24–10.

=== Chicago Bears ===
On July 20, 2016, Silatolu signed with the Chicago Bears. On September 5, 2016, he was released by the Bears.

=== Carolina Panthers (second stint) ===
On February 17, 2017, Silatolu signed a one-year contract with the Panthers. He played in 14 games with three starts for the Panthers in 2017.

On March 26, 2018, Silatolu re-signed with the Panthers. On August 7, 2018, Silatolu suffered a torn meniscus in his left knee which required surgery. On December 7, Silatolu was placed on injured reserve with a knee injury.

== Personal life ==
Silatolu is of Tongan descent; his parents, Saia and Lupe Silatolu, immigrated from Tonga to the San Francisco Bay Area in 1985, where Amini was born and raised. His younger brother Paul Silatolu, a Naval petty officer, served on board the USS New York.
