= TUSD =

TUSD may refer to one or more of the following:

- Tustin Unified School District
- Tucson Unified School District
- Torrance Unified School District
- Tracy Unified School District
- Thousand US dollars
