= Murder of Sandra Cantu =

Murder of young American girl

Sandra Cantu
- Born: Sandra Renee Cantu; March 8, 2001; Tracy, California, U.S.
- Died: March 27, 2009 (aged 8); Tracy, California, U.S.
- Cause of death: Homicidal asphyxiation
- Body discovered: San Joaquin County, California, U.S.
- Resting place: Tracy, California, U.S.
- Known for: Murder victim
- Parents: Daniel Cantu (father); Maria Chavez (mother)

Melissa Huckaby
- Born: Melissa Chantel Lawless; February 23, 1981 (age 45); Orange County, California, US
- Status: Incarcerated
- Convictions: Kidnapping and murder
- Penalty: Life imprisonment without parole

Sandra Renee Cantu (March 8, 2001 – March 27, 2009) was an American girl who gained national attention after she disappeared from Tracy, California, on March 27, 2009. Her body was discovered ten days later inside a suitcase in a local irrigation pond. On April 10, police arrested a local woman, 28-year-old Melissa Huckaby (born February 23, 1981), and charged her with the kidnapping, rape, and murder of Cantu. Huckaby pleaded guilty to the kidnapping and murder of Cantu and was sentenced to life without the possibility of parole in 2010.

== Disappearance and body discovery ==
Sandra Renee Cantu, eight at the time of her death, lived at Orchard Estates Mobile Home Park in Tracy, California, with her mother, grandparents and three older siblings. She was a second grade student at Melville S. Jacobson Elementary School. On Friday, March 27, 2009, Cantu played at a friend's house after school until approximately 4:00 p.m., after which she returned home. She later left home saying that she was going to play at another friend's house. When she did not return for dinner, she was reported missing to the local police at 7:53 p.m.

Police collected footage recorded by a surveillance camera near the family home. The footage, which showed Cantu crossing the street in front of her home before moving out of frame, was played on national news stations. A search of the mobile home complex was conducted without results and the Federal Bureau of Investigation (FBI) was called in to assist on the case. Over the course of the weekend of March 28–29, police dogs, equestrian teams, all-terrain vehicles and a helicopter from the California Highway Patrol were brought in to search for Cantu. A $22,000 reward was offered for information in the case.

One early suspect was a local man who was witnessed kissing Cantu on the lips two years earlier at a local swimming pool, when she was six. He was interviewed and cleared of any involvement.

On April 6, a suitcase containing Cantu's body was found during routine draining of an irrigation pond. The autopsy also revealed a laceration on Sandra’s lower lip and an abrasion on her left elbow, as well as injuries to her genital area consistent with the diameter of a rolling pin handle. A bloodstained piece of cloth was found tied in a noose around Sandra’s head, consistent with homicidal asphyxiation. Toxicology reports confirmed the presence of alprazolam, a benzodiazepine used to treat anxiety, in Sandra’s system. The drug was also found in Melissa Huckaby’s home and purse, suggesting that Sandra had been sedated prior to her death.

== Investigation ==
The profile that FBI experts assigned to the case was a white male aged between 25 and 40 with a criminal history of sexual assault or child pornography. Upon finding Cantu's body, police became suspicious of a number of coincidences regarding Melissa Huckaby, a 28-year-old Sunday school teacher who also lived in the Orchard Estates Mobile Home Park and whose daughter was a friend of Cantu. On the day Cantu disappeared, Huckaby sent a text to Cantu's mother that said "tell the police that I had something stolen today around 4 p.m. I don't know if that makes a difference or not".

The next day, during a vigil for Cantu, Huckaby approached police and FBI agents to report that she had found a note on the ground. They reported she was "very agitated, crying, hyperventilating". The note read: "Cantu locked in stolin [sic] suitcase. Thrown in water onn [sic] Bacchetti Road and Whitehall Road. Witness." Huckaby had a history of mental health problems, including borderline personality disorder, bipolar disorder, and schizophrenia. Prior to the discovery of the body, Huckaby was not a prime suspect. She was interviewed on multiple occasions, but her behavior was assumed to be attention-seeking, rather than evidence of involvement.

After the body was found in the suitcase Huckaby had reported stolen, investigators began taking a closer look at Huckaby's behavior. They took notice of "the unusual fact that a woman who reported losing a suitcase should be the one woman out of everyone in this complex who should happen to find a note that reports that the stolen suitcase was used to hide the child's body". The police got another lead when a retired U.S. Marine and his wife notified police that they had spotted Huckaby and her SUV at the irrigation pond on their property at Bacchetti Road and Whitehall Road between 5:30 p.m. and 6:00 p.m. on March 27. They reportedly recognized Huckaby on television. The witness described her as "distracted and hurried", and she told him, "I just had to pee real quick" when he saw her. Police continued to review the footage from the surveillance camera installed outside Cantu's home, which showed Cantu walking in the direction of Huckaby's residence at 3:54 p.m. on March 27. The camera had captured Huckaby's SUV driving in the opposite direction eight minutes later. At approximately the same time, Huckaby called the trailer park manager to report that a suitcase made by the manufacturer Eddie Bauer had been stolen from her trailer. Eighty-five minutes later, a surveillance camera located outside the parking lot of the church at which Huckaby taught Sunday school captured her driving away from the church. Thirty minutes after that, she was captured returning to the church. It was during this 30-minute time frame that she was spotted at the irrigation pond. FBI agents searched the church and collected a rolling pin from the kitchen which reportedly had a "bloody smudge" on it as well as a bent handle, authorities said. The rolling pin tested positive for Cantu's DNA.

On April 10, 2009, Huckaby was arrested and charged with the murder of Cantu. She received further charges regarding the druggings of a 7-year-old girl and a 37-year-old man; these charges were dropped as part of a plea bargain in which Huckaby pleaded guilty to the first-degree murder and kidnapping of Cantu in order to avoid the death penalty. Huckaby was sentenced to life imprisonment without possibility of parole. At her sentencing, Huckaby said, "I still cannot understand why I did what I did. This is a question I will struggle with for the rest of my life." The prosecutor in the case speculated that she killed Cantu for attention.

== Legacy ==
Sandra Cantu’s memory continues to be deeply honored by the Tracy community, where she is affectionately referred to as "Tracy's Angel." Her elementary school, Melville S. Jacobson Elementary School, celebrates her life through various dedications, including the Sandra Cantu Playground, Sandra's Cottage, and Sandra Cantu Buddy Benches, which foster inclusion and kindness among students.

A local community organizer & relative of Cantu also established the annual Tracy Celebrates Children event in 2011 to commemorate Sandra’s life. This free, city-wide day of play invites children and families to come together, supported by local sponsors and volunteers, to honor childhood and Sandra’s legacy.

== See also ==
- List of murdered American children
- Murder of Lola Daviet - Murder of young French girl
