= Banta Unified School District =

School district in California, United States

Banta Unified School District, formerly Banta Elementary School District, is a school district headquartered in Banta, California.

The district, located in San Joaquin County, California, includes a part of Lathrop and a part of Tracy.

== History ==
When it was an elementary school district, the residents were in the Tracy Unified School District for high school only. Banta ESD students previously attended Merrill F. West High School.

In 2018 the board of education voted to seek to have the district change into being a unified K-12 school district, which would permit the Banta district to operate its own high school. There was a referendum scheduled on November 3, 2020, on whether the district should unify. The 2020 referendum was part of an agreement between the Banta school district, Tracy USD, and the San Joaquin County Office of Education (SJCOE). Dan Moore, the superintendent of Banta ESD, stated that the Tracy district leadership gave consent to the unification plans. On July 1, 2021, the Banta district converted into a unified school district.

While a new high school was scheduled to open, the Banta USD district continued to offer the option of a student going to West High School due to pre-existing community patterns.

== Schools ==
- Banta Elementary & Charter School
  It is a K-8 school. In 2018 its enrollment was declining and there was the possibility of layoffs of teachers.
- River Islands High School
  It was scheduled to open in 2022. The plans were spearheaded by the developers of River Islands. The Banta USD board approved the name "River Islands High School" in a September 2021 meeting. The high school was formerly a charter school. On July 1, 2026, it changed from being a charter school to a school being directly controlled by Banta USD. Dennis Wyatt of the Manteca/Ripon Bulletin wrote that because the academic standards and employees were staying the same, "for all practical purposes nothing will change".
