= Tracer (bus) =

- Founded: 2001
- Routes: 4 regular 3 commuter
- Hubs: Tracy Transit Center
- Annual ridership: 175,000
- Website: www.ridetracer.com

Tracer is the public bus system for the city of Tracy, California. Unique among transit agencies, since 2002 the service operates as free public transport every April and December.

== Operations ==
The service provides seven circulator routes. The buses are designated by letters A through G. Fares range from free to $1.50 depending on the category. Most routes operate from approximately 7 AM to 7 PM weekdays and 9 AM to 5 PM on 30–60 minute headways. Service is provided to the Tracy ACE station and to West Valley Mall. Major hubs for this bus system are Tracy Transit Center with connections to San Joaquin Regional Transit District (RTD) bus lines to neighboring communities in addition to Greyhound Lines and Amtrak Thruway services. The service's second hub is at Walmart and provides intercity connections to Stockton through RTD. The Tracer line A connects with Amtrak Thruway buses at the Tracy Amtrak Bus Stop at Clover Road near I-205 and Tracy Boulevard. Line 6 runs six daily trips in either direction between Stockton and San Jose, California while line 34 twice daily trips to San Francisco. San Joaquin RTD operates commuter service between Stockton and Dublin/Pleasanton BART station via Tracy on line 150.

== Routes ==
Commuter Routes operate Monday to Friday only. There is no service on Sundays.

Route	Terminal(s)	Notes
A	West Valley Mall to Tracy Transit Center	Some Buses Start at Grant Line & East
B	West Valley Mall to Tracy Transit Center	Also Serves Sutter Tracy Hospital
C Central Ave/Eastlake Loop	Tracy Transit Center	
D Full City Commuter Loop	Tracy Transit Center	Stops At Tracy ACE Train Station
E North Tracy Commuter Loop	Tracy Transit Center	
F South Tracy Commuter Loop	Tracy Transit Center	Stops At Tracy ACE Train Station
G South West Commuter Loop	Tracy Transit Center	Stops at Kimball High School
