= Tucker Addington =

American football player (born 1997)

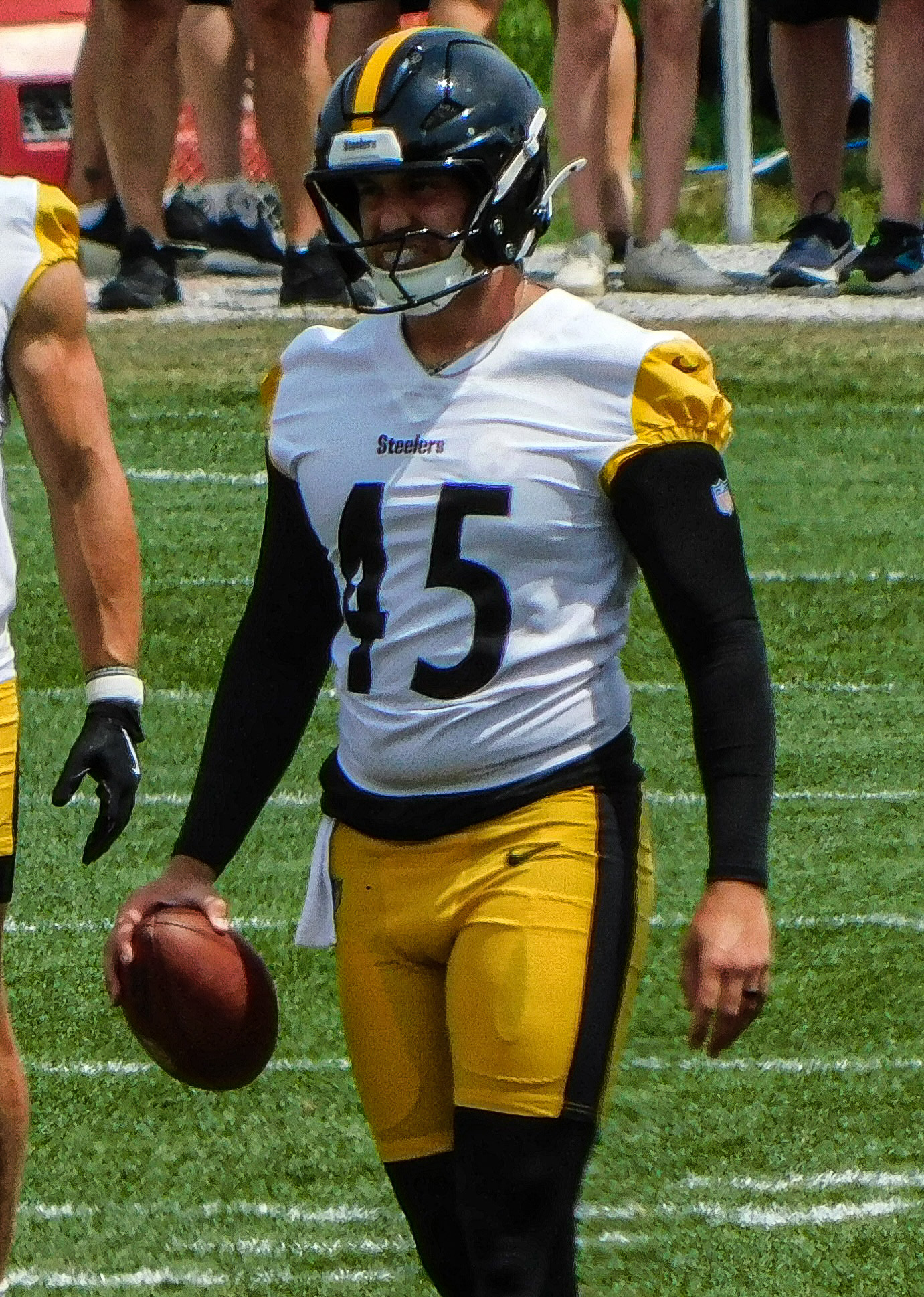
- Addington in 2025

No. 46 – Miami Dolphins
- Position: Long snapper
- Roster status: Active

Personal information
- Born: July 16, 1997 (age 29); New Braunfels, Texas, U.S.
- Listed height: 6 ft 2 in (1.88 m)
- Listed weight: 228 lb (103 kg)

Career information
- High school: Canyon (New Braunfels)
- College: Sam Houston State (2016–2019)
- NFL draft: 2020: undrafted

Career history
- Houston Gamblers (2022); Dallas Cowboys (2022)*; New England Patriots (2022); Jacksonville Jaguars (2023)*; Washington Commanders (2023); New England Patriots (2024)*; Miami Dolphins (2024); Jacksonville Jaguars (2024)*; Houston Texans (2025)*; Pittsburgh Steelers (2025)*; Miami Dolphins (2026–present)
- * Offseason or practice squad member only

Career NFL statistics as of Week 8, 2026
- Games played: 17
- Total tackles: 3
- Stats at Pro Football Reference

Tucker Addington (born July 16, 1997) is an American professional football long snapper for the Miami Dolphins of the National Football League (NFL). He played college football for the Sam Houston State Bearkats and spent two years out of football before being selected in the 2022 USFL draft by the Houston Gamblers, where he played one season. Addington has also been a member of the Dallas Cowboys, Washington Commanders, and Pittsburgh Steelers.

== Early life and education ==
Addington was born on July 16, 1997, in New Braunfels, Texas. He attended Canyon High School, playing two years as a starter on the football team and recording 137 all-purpose yards. He appeared in six games as a senior, and also participated in the discus throw. Addington began attending Sam Houston State University in 2016, and earned the starting long snapper role as a true freshman, appearing in a total of 11 games. He recorded two tackles and one fumble recovery that season.

As a sophomore, Addington appeared in all 14 games, helping Sam Houston State to a 12–2 record and a playoff berth. In his junior season, he played 11 games and recorded three tackles, two of which were solo. As a senior, he helped them compile a record of 7–5 while appearing in all 12 games and recording three tackles and one fumble recovered.

Addington is an alumnus of the Texas Long Snapping organization, and while attending it posted the fastest snapping speed of any player there (.65); he was later inducted into their Hall of Honor. From 2020 to 2021, while a free agent in professional football, Addington served as an assistant coach with the organization.

== Professional career ==
Pre-draft measurables
Height	Weight
6 ft 1 5/8 in (1.87 m)	231 lb (105 kg)
Values from Pro Day

Addington went unselected in the 2020 NFL draft and spent the following two seasons out of professional football, working at the Texas Long Snapping camp.

=== Houston Gamblers ===
In 2022, he was selected in the sixth round of the 2022 USFL supplemental draft by the Houston Gamblers. He appeared in all ten of their games, as the Gamblers compiled a 3–7 record and placed fourth in their division.

=== Dallas Cowboys ===
On October 4, 2022, Addington was signed along with Matt Overton to the practice squad of the Dallas Cowboys, to compete for the long snapping position, following an injury to Jake McQuaide. Overton won the job and Addington was released on October 11.

=== New England Patriots (first stint) ===
On December 14, 2022, Addington was signed to the practice squad of the New England Patriots after Joe Cardona was listed on the injury report. On December 23, he was signed to the active roster after Cardona was placed on injured reserve. He made his debut in Week 16 against the Cincinnati Bengals. Addington played in a total of three games for the Patriots in 2022. He was waived on August 15, 2023.

=== Jacksonville Jaguars (first stint) ===
Addington was signed by the Jacksonville Jaguars on August 20, 2023, after releasing long snapper Carson Tinker. He was waived on August 29.

=== Washington Commanders ===
On December 19, 2023, Addington signed with the Washington Commanders' practice squad. He was signed to the active roster on December 30, 2023, and was released on April 15, 2024.

=== New England Patriots (second stint) ===
On August 5, 2024, Addington signed with the New England Patriots. He was released on August 26. He was re-signed to the practice squad on October 11, following an injury to Joe Cardona. He was released on October 22.

=== Miami Dolphins ===
On November 5, 2024, Addington was signed to the Miami Dolphins practice squad. He was released on November 25.

=== Jacksonville Jaguars (second stint) ===
On December 3, 2024, Addington signed with the Jacksonville Jaguars' practice squad. He was released by Jacksonville on December 10.

=== Houston Texans ===
On February 17, 2025, Addington signed a reserve/futures contract with the Houston Texans. He was waived on June 20.

=== Pittsburgh Steelers ===
On June 25, 2025, Addington signed a one-year contract with the Pittsburgh Steelers. He was released by Pittsburgh on August 7.

=== Miami Dolphins (second stint) ===
On March 13, 2026, Addington signed with the Miami Dolphins.
