= Matt Overton =

American football player (born 1985)

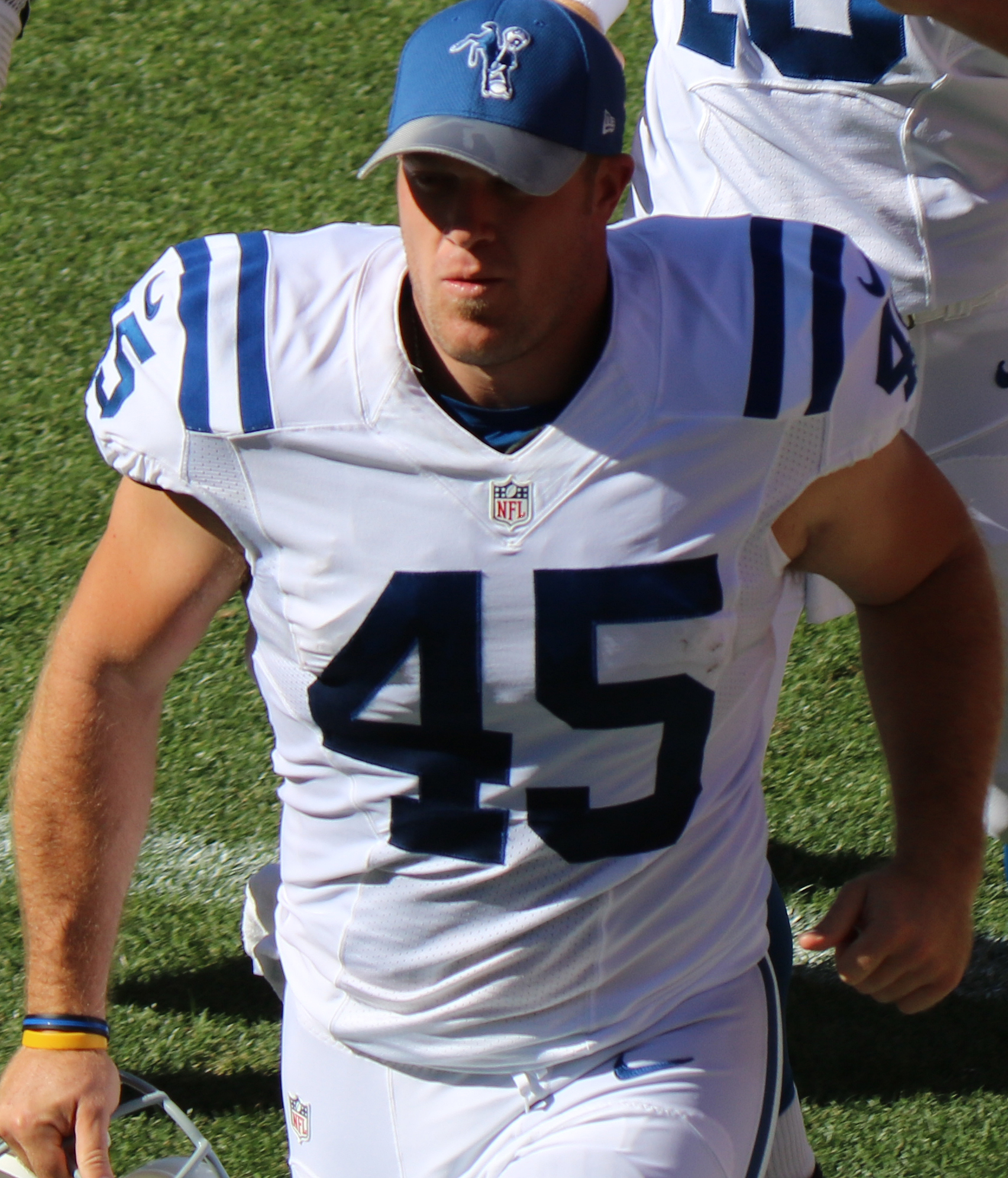
- Overton with the Indianapolis Colts in 2016

Profile
- Position: Long snapper

Personal information
- Born: July 6, 1985 (age 41); San Leandro, California, U.S.
- Listed height: 6 ft 1 in (1.85 m)
- Listed weight: 254 lb (115 kg)

Career information
- High school: Tracy (Tracy, California)
- College: Diablo Valley (2003–2004); Western Washington (2005–2006)
- NFL draft: 2007: undrafted

Career history
- Seattle Seahawks (2007)*; Tri-Cities Fever (2008); Florida Tuskers (2009); Seattle Seahawks (2010)*; Omaha Nighthawks (2010–2011); Indianapolis Colts (2012–2016); Jacksonville Jaguars (2017–2018); Los Angeles Chargers (2019); Tennessee Titans (2020); Los Angeles Chargers (2021); Los Angeles Rams (2022)*; Dallas Cowboys (2022); Chicago Bears (2023)*; Miami Dolphins (2024)
- * Offseason or practice squad member only

Awards and highlights
- Pro Bowl (2013)

Career NFL statistics as of 2024
- Games played: 142
- Total tackles: 26
- Stats at Pro Football Reference

Matthew Thomas Overton (born July 6, 1985) is an American professional football long snapper. He played college football at Western Washington after graduating from Diablo Valley College, and was signed as an undrafted free agent by the Seattle Seahawks of the National Football League (NFL) in 2007.

In between stints with the Seahawks, Overton played for the Tri-Cities Fever of the af2 in 2008 and the Florida Tuskers of the United Football League in 2009. After his release from the Seahawks in 2010, he rejoined the UFL but as a member of the Omaha Nighthawks. In 2010, he was named to the UFL's top-10 players list, earning him the recognition as the league's top long snapper. He later played for the Indianapolis Colts, Jacksonville Jaguars, Tennessee Titans, Los Angeles Chargers, and Dallas Cowboys of the NFL.

He made the Pro Bowl with the Colts in 2013.

== Early life ==
Overton attended Tracy High School in Tracy, California where he was a two-way starter for four years for the Bulldogs football team. He earned Lineman of the Year, player of the month, athlete of the month awards, and 2002 SJAA honorable mention honors. Despite these accolades, Overton was not offered any scholarships coming out of high school and opted to attend Diablo Valley College, a junior college in Pleasant Hill, California.

== College career ==
Overton began his college football career at Diablo Valley College. In his time with DVC, Overton earned Special Teams MVP and Team Captain honors. He soon began to receive scholarship offers to 4-year institutions, and accepted an offer to attend Western Washington University. At Western Washington, he was a team captain and two-year starter at defensive end and long snapper. As the starting defensive end, he recorded over 40 tackles, 5 sacks, 7.5 tackles for loss, 1 interception, 1 forced fumble and 7 pass break-ups.

== Professional career ==
=== Early career ===
Overton played for the Tri-Cities Fever of the af2 in 2008. He played for the Florida Tuskers of the United Football League in 2009 and helped them to an undefeated season and appeared in the first UFL championship. He was re-signed by the Seattle Seahawks on February 10, 2010. After being released by the Seahawks during training camp, he signed with the Omaha Nighthawks of the UFL for his second season. Overton was named to the UFL top-10 players list in 2010. He was protected by the Nighthawks for the 2011 season.

=== Indianapolis Colts ===
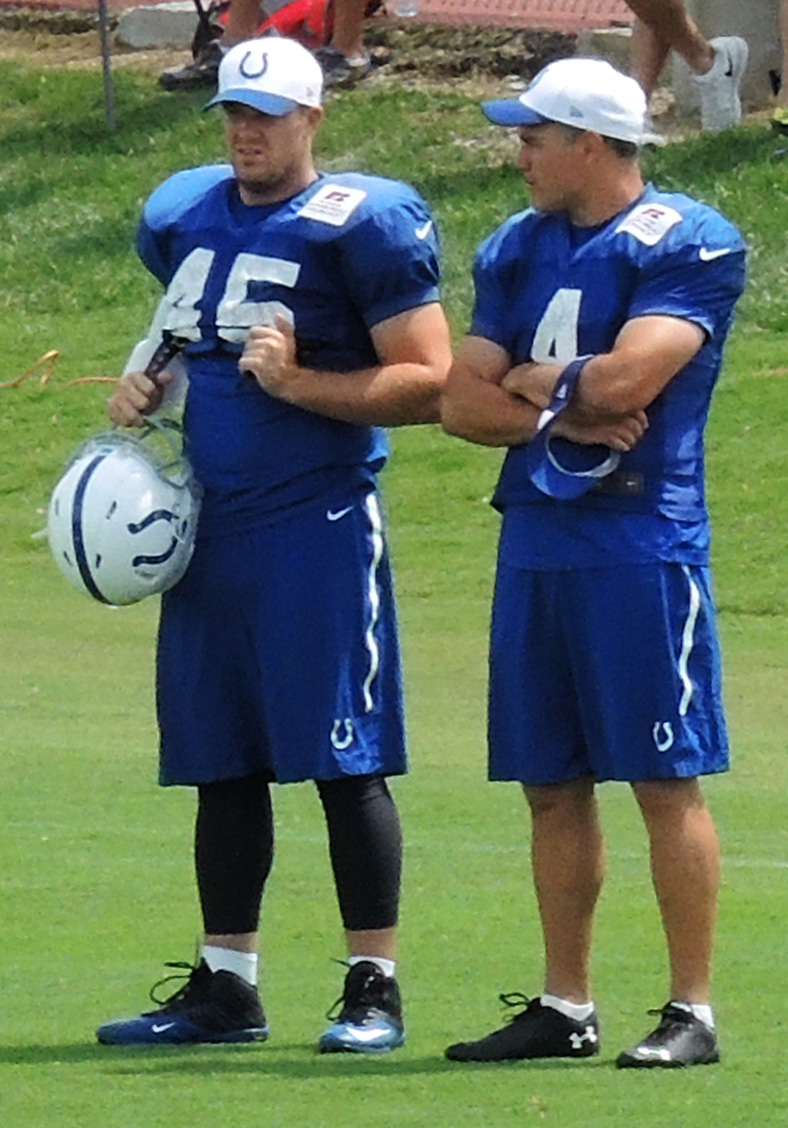
Overton (left) and Adam Vinatieri (right) at the Colts training camp in 2015

On April 3, 2012, Overton signed with the Indianapolis Colts. Used primarily as a long snapper, he was named to the Pro Bowl in 2013. On March 3, 2015, Overton signed a four-year extension with the Colts. The Colts released him on May 1, 2017.

=== Jacksonville Jaguars ===
Overton was signed by the Jacksonville Jaguars on August 3, 2017, after Carson Tinker suffered a torn ACL. On November 14, following the team's Week 10 win over the Los Angeles Chargers, Overton was placed on injured reserve with a dislocated shoulder.

On October 11, 2018, Overton was re-signed by the Jaguars after Carson Tinker suffered another knee injury.

On March 7, 2019, Overton re-signed with the Jaguars. He was released on September 1, 2019.

=== Los Angeles Chargers (first stint) ===
On November 15, 2019, Overton was signed by the Los Angeles Chargers, but was released three days later.

=== Tennessee Titans ===
On October 12, 2020, Overton was signed to the Tennessee Titans practice squad. He was elevated to the active roster on November 7, November 12, and November 21 for the team's weeks 9, 10, and 11 games against the Chicago Bears, Indianapolis Colts, and Baltimore Ravens, and reverted to the practice squad after each game. On November 28, 2020, Overton was promoted to the active roster.

=== Los Angeles Chargers (second stint) ===
On August 16, 2021, Overton signed with the Chargers.

=== Los Angeles Rams ===
On September 13, 2022, Overton signed with the practice squad of the Los Angeles Rams. He was released on September 20.

=== Dallas Cowboys ===
On October 4, 2022, Overton was signed by the Dallas Cowboys' to the practice squad, to compete with long snapper Tucker Addington. On October 15, Overton was promoted to the active roster to replace Jake McQuaide, who was lost for the year with a torn left tricep. He wasn't re-signed after the season.

=== Chicago Bears ===
On January 3, 2024, Overton was signed to the Chicago Bears practice squad after Patrick Scales was injured. He was not signed to a reserve/future contract after the season and thus became a free agent.

=== Miami Dolphins ===
On October 19, 2024, Overton was signed to the Miami Dolphins' practice squad. On October 28, Overton started as long snapper in the game against the Arizona Cardinals. On November 5, Overton was released by the Dolphins.

== NFL career statistics ==
Year	Team	Games
2012	IND	16
2013	IND	16
2014	IND	16
2015	IND	16
2016	IND	16
2017	JAX	9
2018	JAX	11
2020	TEN	9
2021	LAC	17
2022	DAL	13
2024	MIA	3
Career		142

== Personal life ==
Overton is a Christian. He is married to Breanna Overton. They have two daughters together.

Overton runs his own youth charity foundation called Pros 2 Youth and owns and operates a small business with his former Nighthawks teammates Maurice Clarett and Chad Lucas called Led By Pros. Led By Pros is located in Omaha, Nebraska and offers a youth football academy and helps young athletes to succeed in life and in sport.
