= Tracy High School =

Location
- 315 E. 11th Street; Tracy, California 95376; United States
- Coordinates: 37.74081°N 121.41924°W

Information
- Former name: West Side Union High School
- Type: Public
- Founded: 1917
- School district: Tracy Unified School District
- Principal: Jon Waggle
- Teaching staff: 75.90 (FTE)
- Enrollment: 1,722 (2023-2024)
- Student to teacher ratio: 22.69
- Colours: Dark Green; Gold
- Athletics conference: CIF Sac-Joaquin Section Tri-City Athletics League
- Mascot: Brutus the Bulldog
- Yearbook: El Portal
- Website: http://www.tracy.k12.ca.us/sites/ths/

Tracy High School is a four-year public secondary school located in Tracy, California, United States. Enrollment during the 2009-2010 school year was 2339 students.

== History ==
The West Side Union High School, renamed Tracy Union High School in 1928, is located on Tracy's eastern edge on 12 acres (49,000 m^{2}) of land on Eleventh Street. Prior to its opening in 1917, high school students attended classes in second-floor classrooms at Tracy School on Central Avenue. Before 1912, students had to attend school in Stockton or elsewhere.

The high school, designed by W.H. Weeks in the mission style, was built on the unit system so additions could be made without changing the building's style. Costing about $65,000, the school was originally built with 14 classrooms and an auditorium with seating for about 1,000 people. In 1922 a gymnasium was added so that the school would meet California accreditation requirements.

In 2006 the voters passed Measure E, which provided the funds to completely renovate the campus. In October 2006, the old west building, built in 1917, was torn down because it was condemned by the state of California. It was replaced by a new 40-classroom building in the mission style, completed in 2008-2009. This now functions as the new main building on campus, housing the main offices in addition to two floors of classrooms.

== Academics ==
Academic programs include the International Baccalaureate Program, the Ag-Science Academy, a Performing Arts Magnet, Child Development and Education, Food Education and Service Training (FEAST), and Industrial Technology. In 2007 the school was named a California Distinguished High School.

Marching Band & Color Guard

The Pride of Tracy Marching Band and Color Guard, founded in 1924, is the official competitive marching ensemble of Tracy High School. With a long standing tradition of parade excellence, the band is known for its militaristic hybrid marching style, and commitment to a growth mindset.

For many years, Tracy High hosted the Tracy Band Review, which was once one of the largest band reviews in California. While unconfirmed, some sources suggest that The Tournament of Roses Parade committee often used this review to evaluate and select bands for the prestigious Rose Parade. Though the review ended in the early 1990s, the Pride of Tracy remains a respected force in NCBA parade competition, consistently competing in 1A-2A divisions. The band was named 2019 2A NCBA Parade Champions, while the color guard secured the 2024 2A NCBA Guard Championship title.

In 1972, the Pride of Tracy appeared in the film The Candidate, starring Robert Redford. The scene features the band marching through downtown Tracy during a political rally. This remains the band’s only known appearance in a major motion picture.

Despite being a strictly parade-based program, many Pride of Tracy members have gone on to Drum Corps International. Additionally, Tracy High Drum Majors have been recognized as USA Drum Major Association All-American Drum Majors, performing at international events such as the London New Year’s Day Parade (LNYDP).

Performance Style & Traditions

The Pride of Tracy maintains a militaristic, traditional approach, rejecting modern visual elements in favor of a disciplined, structured performance style. The band marches in green jackets with gold accents, shakos with French plumes, and drum majors traditionally spin maces (though this can vary based on experience or height.)

Unlike many parade bands, Tracy’s color guard is not just a support unit but a standalone visual ensemble, performing independently while complementing the band’s music. The winter guard competes separately in the CVGPC circuit, consistently placing in the top ranks and winning the 2019 Scholastic Regional A Championship.

The band believes in an “if one person does it, we all do it” philosophy, fostering a culture of teamwork and energy driven performance. At rallies, the band has a dedicated section, and at the end of every football game, rally, and graduation ceremony, it proudly plays the school’s alma mater.

Repertoire & Musical Approach

While the Pride of Tracy heavily avoids traditional Sousa marches in its repertoire, the band embraces mainstream music trends in its pep performances. The song selection rotates annually and has recently included “Hot To Go” by Chappell Roan and “Not Like Us” by Kendrick Lamar. However, two pieces remain constant: the Alma Mater and the Tracy High Fight Song.

Unique to the program, students actively contribute to arranging music for pep tunes that may not have published arrangements. The band allows all brass and woodwind instruments, with a small rotating percussion section (typically one bass drum, snare, cymbal player, and occasionally a bells player).

Leadership & Structure

The band is led by Director Jacob Cortez and maintains a clear leadership structure, with roles including:

• Drum Major (serves as the liaison and oversees all sections)

• Assistant Drum Major

• Color Guard Captain

• Brass Leader

• Woodwind Leader

• Percussion Captain

Engagement & Community Presence

The Pride of Tracy is one of the most visually branded and socially active organizations at Tracy High. The uniform features a delta emblem, symbolizing the Tracy Geographical Triangle, and three chevrons.

The band actively collaborates with other schools, combining forces with West High and Kimball High for the Tracy Holiday Lights Parade in 2023, the first time in history the three schools marched together. Additionally, Tracy High is invited to perform at Kimball and West’s home football games.

The first semester is dedicated to recruitment, with tours to local middle schools to inspire the next generation of performers.

== Popular culture ==
- A scene in the film The Candidate was shot in Tracy, utilizing the school's homecoming parade as the film's campaign parade for the movie's fictional senatorial candidate, played by Robert Redford. Tracy High's staff, including principal and vice-principal, had cameo roles as Secret Service agents. The Tracy High Marching Band Program also make an appearance.
- The Tracy High football field and MVP trophy are named after Peter B. Kyne, a novelist from San Francisco whose Bohemian Club friends orchestrated the naming in 1927, Peter B. Kyne and his Bohemian Club friends had given the money to purchase the equipment required for early Tracy High sports.

== Notable alumni ==
- Keyshia Cole '00 - singer and actress
- Nick Eddy '62 - NFL player
- Rod Lauren '57 - Singer/actor.
- Christine Maddox '68 - December 1973 Playmate of the Month.
- Matt Overton '03 - NFL player
- Richard Pombo '79 - United States congressman
- Bob Swenson '71 - NFL player
