= Tracy Learning Center =

Charter school in California, United States

Coordinates: 37.7452°N 121.4243°W

Information
- School type: Charter school
- Established: 2001; 25 years ago
- Grades: K-12
- Enrollment: c.850
- Website: www.tracylc.net

The Tracy Learning Center is a charter school located in Tracy, California, USA. Serving students in grades K–12, it was founded in 2001 and had an enrollment of 125 students. Charter status was awarded in June 2002. It was decided, in June 2003, to relocate the Tracy Learning Center to the Clover Middle School site and to expand it to become a K–12 charter school. Expansion of the school was completed in 2007, with the addition of the senior class, that took numbers up to 850.

For the 2024–2025 school year, the Tracy Learning Center had a population of 1,254 students across all three schools. It continues to be one of the highest ranked schools in the city and county.

== Primary Charter ==
Tracy Learning Center's elementary school is called Primary Charter. It serves grades TK-4.

According to Niche, a national education-ranking agency, Primary has an overall grade of A-, making it the best charter elementary school in the county. Both math and reading have a 62% proficiency rating.

== Discovery Middle ==
Tracy Learning Center's middle school is called Discovery Middle. It serves grades 5–8.

According to Niche, Discovery has an average grade of a B-. It has the lowest proficiency between all three schools, with a 25% mathematical proficiency and a 40% proficiency in reading.

== Millennium High ==
Tracy Learning Center's high school, Millennium, has a unique nest point system that revolves around their mascot, the falcon. Each grade level is assigned a nest whose name originates from real falcons. Members of the nest with the most points by the end of the year will earn a reward of some form. Points are awarded or deducted from individual students based on behavior and academic performance.

According to Niche, Millennium scored an overall grade of A, making it the second best charter high school in San Joaquin County. Factors taken into account include quality of teachers, parent and student reviews, activities, and design of curriculum. Their average SAT score is an 1170 and the average ACT score is a 26. Most students did better in English than Mathematics on these tests. They have addressed this issue by redesigning the math curriculum in 2019.

Millennium has a full range of Division V athletic teams in the California Interscholastic Federation (CIF). Another notable activity is the marching band and colorguard, which participates in competitions hosted by the Northern California Band Association (NCBA). They are classified either in the 1A or 2A category. Other clubs and activities include Academic Decathlon and Speech and Debate.
