= Merrill F. West High School =

Location
- 1775 West Lowell Avenue; Tracy, California 95376; United States; 37°44′53″N 121°27′04″W

Information
- Established: 1993
- School district: Tracy Joint Unified School District
- Principal: Gary Henderson
- Staff: 92.27 (FTE)
- Enrollment: 2,066 (2023-2024)
- Student to teacher ratio: 22.39
- Campus size: 51 acres (21 ha)
- Colors: Navy blue and Vegas gold
- Athletics conference: CIF Sac-Joaquin Section
- Mascot: Wolfie and Wolfina
- Accreditation: Western Association of Schools and Colleges
- Newspaper: The Zephyr
- Yearbook: Los Lobos
- Website: School website

Merrill F. West High School (also known as West High School) is a four-year, public secondary school located on the northwest side of Tracy, California, United States. A member of the Tracy Unified School District, the school was founded in 1993. Enrollment in 2018–2019 was 2,043 students.

== History ==
Merrill Fuller West was a native of Laurel, Iowa who moved to Tracy in 1936 to farm produce crops and walnuts. Mr. West served as a TUSD board member for eleven years (1954-1965), four of which as president. He also served on the County Board of Education in the 1950s. Mr. West stated his vision for education as, "The important goal, as I see it, is to give all our children an equal opportunity for a quality education with maximum efficiency of the taxpayers’ dollar."

The campus stretches over 51 acres and currently supports more than 2,000 students. West High opened its doors in 1993 under the leadership of principal Bob Palous. Both the school colors (Navy blue and Vegas gold) and mascot (the wolfpack) were voted on by the first year students. Students are known as the Wolf Pack. Mr. Palous served as principal for only three years before leaving the district. The second principal, Herman Calad, met the challenge of bringing WHS into the 21st century while facing ever-shrinking budgets and increasing pressure to produce high standardized test scores. Mr. Calad served with distinction for twelve years before retiring. Mr. Frase, West's third principal, left his own mark on the school. To this day, through the leadership of its principal Troy Brown, WHS continues to uphold Mr. West's vision of giving all students an equal opportunity to a quality education. In 2017, Troy Brown moved on and was replaced by Zachary Boswell.

In 2003, West High School was eligible for the Governor's Performance Award and was named a California Distinguished School.

== Attendance boundary ==
Students living in the boundary of what was the Banta Elementary School District previously were automatically assigned to West High. This included a part of Lathrop and a part of Tracy. On July 1, 2021, the Banta district converted into a unified school district and became the Banta Unified School District. This permitted the Banta district to open its own high school (River Islands High School ). While a new high school was scheduled to open, the Banta USD district continued to offer the option of a student going to West High School due to pre-existing community patterns.

== Curriculum ==
West High School provides offers programs, such as AFJROTC Distinguished Unit CA-20161, Academy of Business and Law, Space and Engineering Academy, Advanced Placement, and Advancement Via Individual Determination.

West High School currently offers fifteen Advanced Placement courses.

== AFJROTC ==
The school's AFJROTC program Unit CA-20161 was started in 2016 with only around 60 cadets, the original instructor was Maj. Matthew Wilson. In 2018 the program was taken over by SMSgt. John Scott Morris II and soon after the second instructor Maj. Archie Roundtree came in late 2019. Since then the Unit has received multiple Distinguished Unit Awards and also has received multiple trophies from Color Guard, Exhibition and Unarmed Regulation events. In 2022-2023 the program has since grown to around 200 cadets.

== Athletics ==
The school's teams are nicknamed the Wolf Pack and school colors are Navy blue and Vegas gold, both of which were chosen by the student body in 1993. West High School offers a variety of sports, including cheerleading, American football, badminton, baseball, basketball, golf, gymnastics, soccer, softball, swimming, tennis, track and field, cross country, water polo, volleyball and wrestling. West High belongs to the Tri-City Athletics League (TCAL).

== Notable people ==
- Keyshia Cole - American singer, songwriter, actress, and television producer
- Saweetie - American Rapper/Songwriter
- Amini Silatolu, 2007. National Football League, Carolina Panthers
