= Tracy station =

Train station in Tracy, California, United States

Tracy

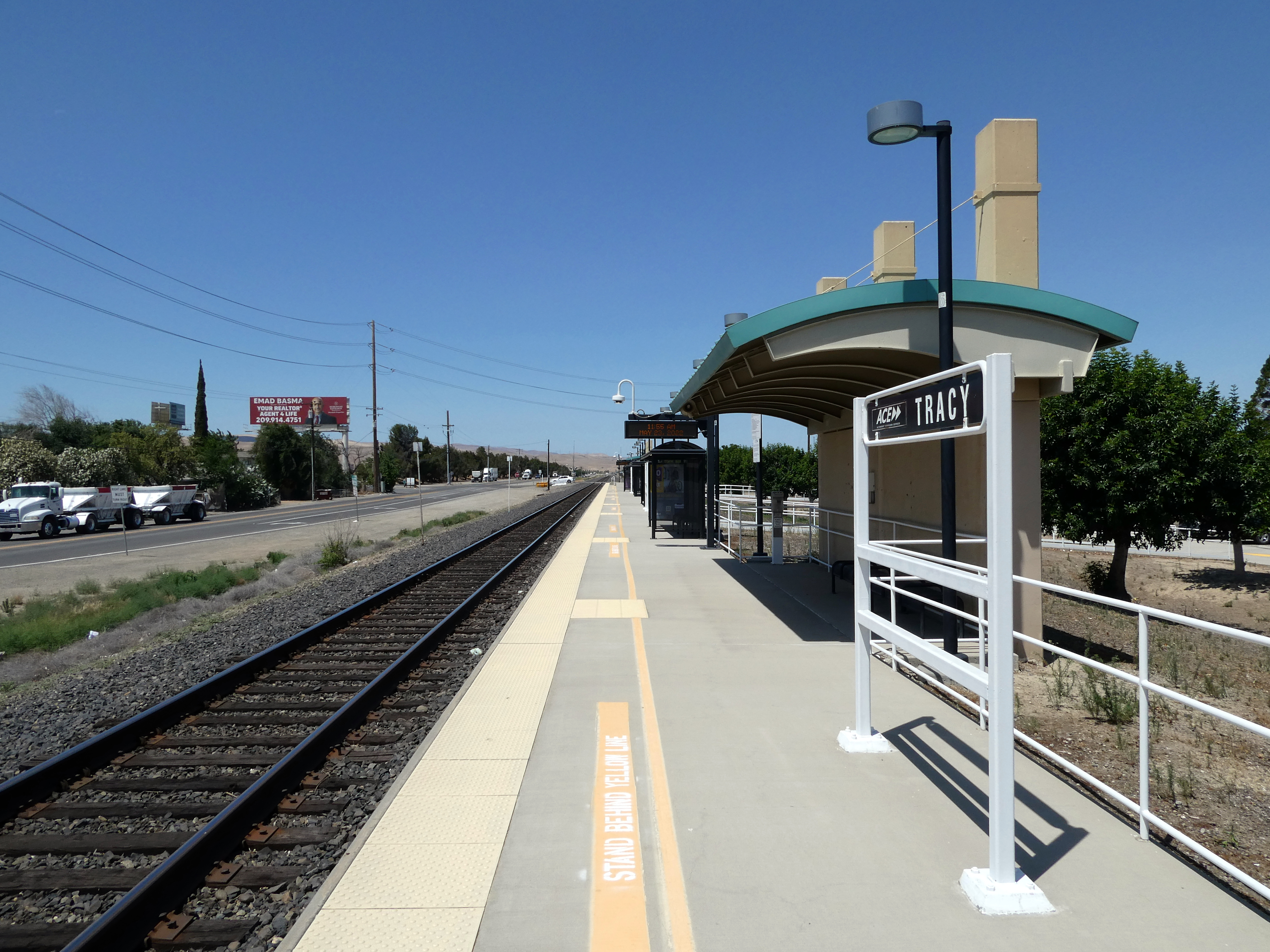
- Tracy station in May 2022

General information
- Location: 4800 Tracy Boulevard; Tracy, California
- Coordinates: 37°41′46.68″N 121°26′6.64″W
- Line: UP Oakland Subdivision
- Platforms: 1 side platform
- Tracks: 1
- Connections: Amtrak Thruway: 6; Tracer: D, F, G

Construction
- Cycle facilities: Lockers available
- Accessible: yes

Other information
- Station code: Amtrak: TRC

History
- Opened: October 19, 1998

Services
Preceding station	Altamont Corridor Express	Following station
Vasco Road toward San Jose	San Jose – Stockton	Lathrop/Manteca toward Stockton
Location

Tracy station is a commuter rail station in southern Tracy, California served by the Altamont Corridor Express. It is on the Union Pacific Railroad Oakland Subdivision, formerly the Western Pacific Railroad. Construction of the station began in April 1998, and it was one of ACE's inaugural stops upon commencement of service on October 19 of that year.
