= Interstate 205 (California) =

Interstate highway in California

Interstate 205
- Robert T. Monagan Freeway
- I-205 highlighted in red

Route information
- Auxiliary route of I-5
- Maintained by Caltrans
- Length: 12.97 mi (20.87 km)
- Existed: December 1970–present
- History: State highway in 1910
- NHS: Entire route

Major junctions
- West end: I-580 near Tracy
- I-205 BL in Tracy; CR J4 in Tracy; CR J13 in Tracy
- East end: I-5 near Lathrop

Location
- Country: United States
- State: California
- Counties: Alameda, San Joaquin

Highway system
- Interstate Highway System; Main; Auxiliary; Suffixed; Business; Future; State highways in California; Interstate; US; State; Scenic; History; Pre‑1964; Unconstructed; Deleted; Freeways
← SR 204	→ SR 206

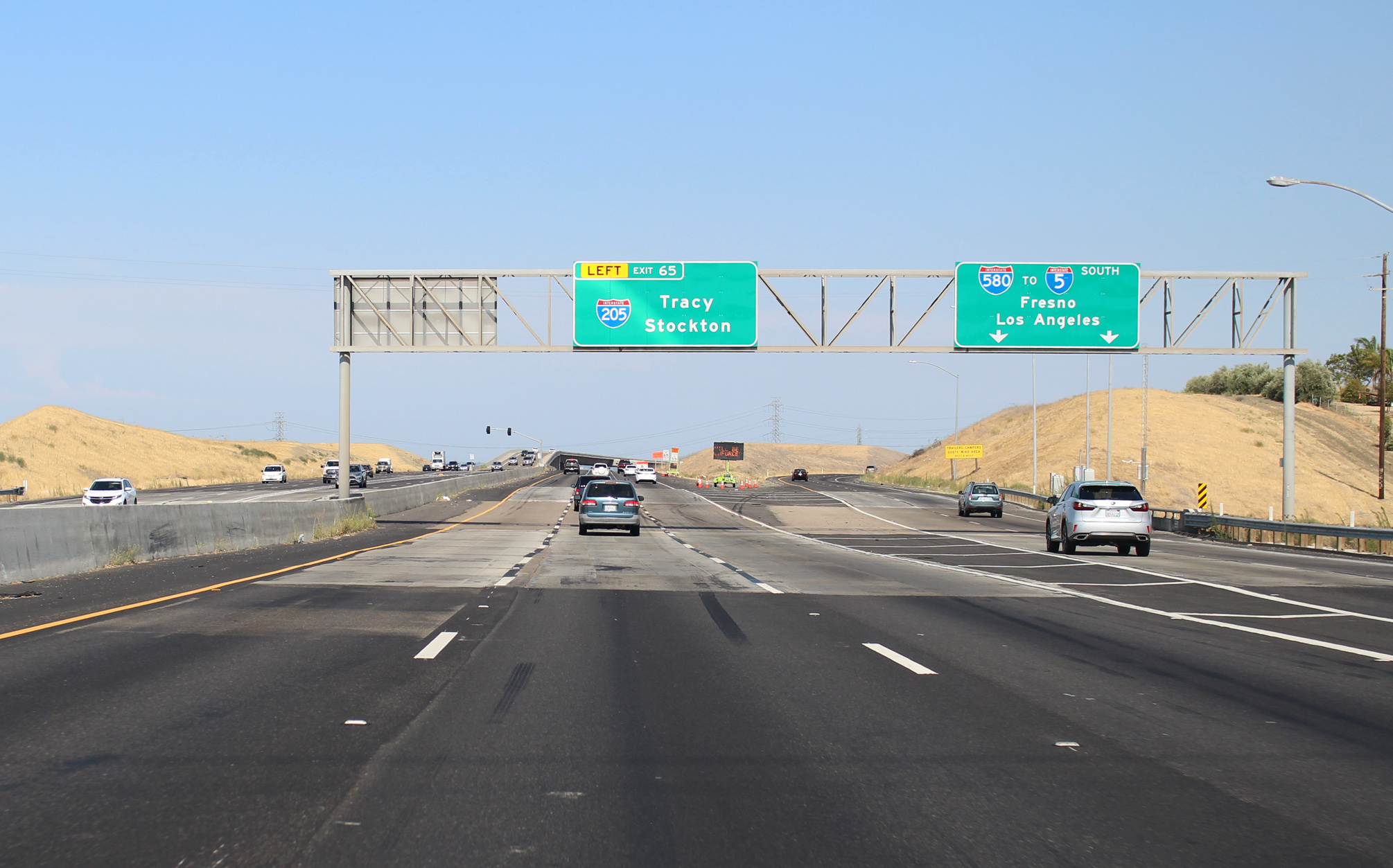
The western end of I-205, as seen by eastbound traffic entering from I-580

Interstate 205 (I-205) is an east–west auxiliary Interstate Highway in the San Joaquin Valley in Northern California. It runs from I-5 west to I-580. Along with those highways, I-205 forms the north side of a triangle around the city of Tracy. The route provides access from the San Francisco Bay Area to the northern San Joaquin Valley.

When I-205 opened in December 1970, it replaced 11th Street, which passed through downtown Tracy, as part of the primary all-land connection between the Bay Area and Sacramento until the Carquinez Bridge opened in 1927 and carried the Lincoln Highway and later US Route 50 (US 50). 11th Street is now signed as I-205 Business (I-205 Bus.).

== Route description ==
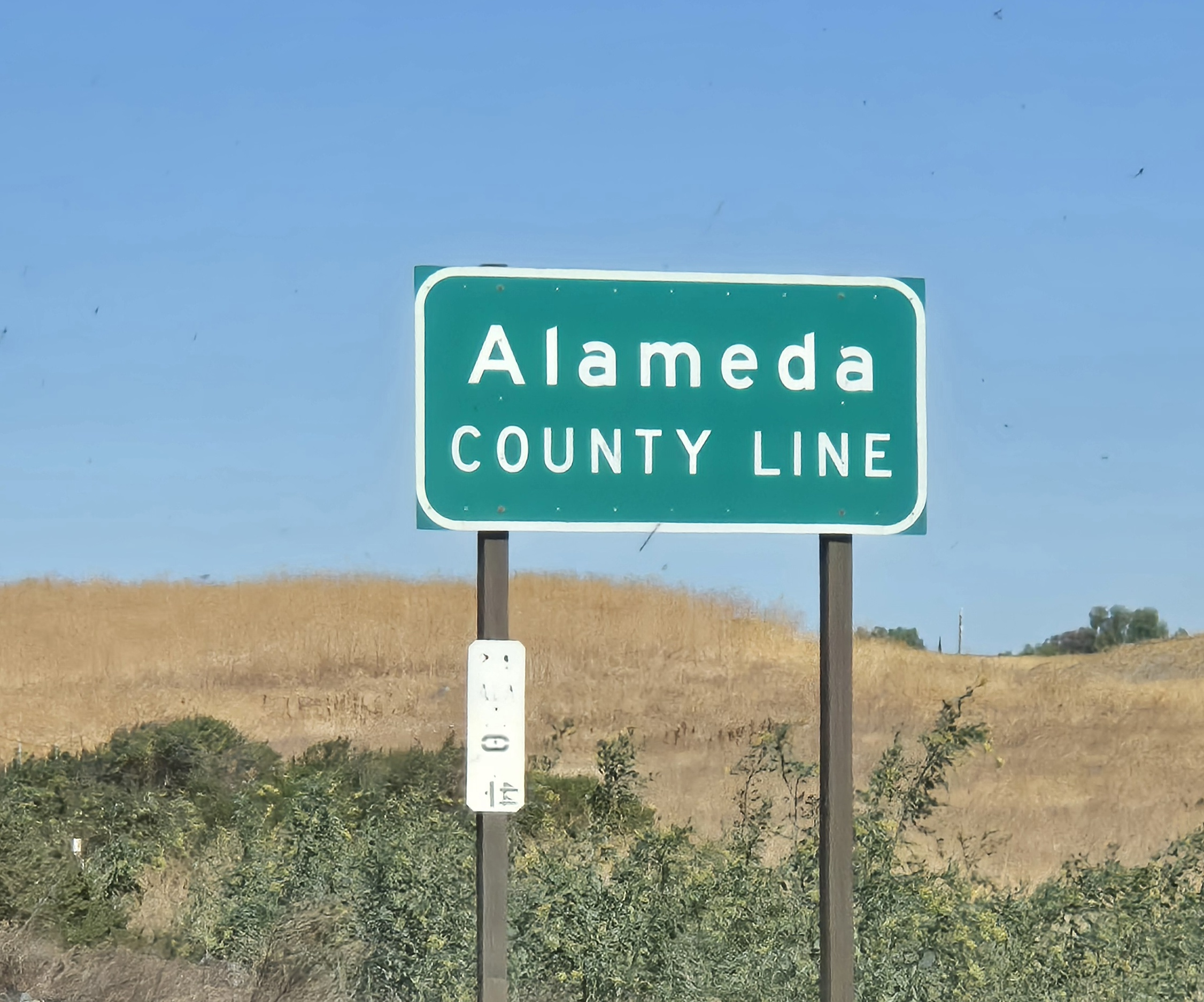
The Alameda County Line Sign as seen from I-205 West towards Interstate 580.

The entirety of I-205 is defined in section 505 of the California Streets and Highways Code as Route 205, and that the highway is from "Route 580 west of Tracy to Route 5 east of Tracy". This definition roughly corresponds with the Federal Highway Administration (FHWA)'s route logs of I-205.

I-205 begins at the bottom of I-580's eight-lane descent from Altamont Pass into the San Joaquin Valley. Here I-580 turns southeast to a junction with I-5, paralleling the California Aqueduct and Delta–Mendota Canal along the foothills, while I-205 continues east as a six-lane roadway, immediately crossing both waterways. The first interchange is with Mountain House Parkway, formerly Patterson Pass Road, which serves the city of Mountain House. Next is a split with I-205 Bus., a business loop that follows 11th Street through Tracy. As I-205 curves east-northeast and back east through the northern part of Tracy, it has interchanges with Grant Line Road (County Route J4 [CR J4] toward Antioch), Tracy Boulevard (CR J13 through downtown Tracy), and MacArthur Drive. After several miles without an interchange, the highway ends at a merge with I-5, where traffic can continue northeast to the junction with State Route 120 (SR 120) near Manteca and then east on SR 120 toward Yosemite National Park or north on I-5 toward Stockton.

As it connects to I-580, I-205 is a frequently-congested major commuter route to the Bay Area. Signs on eastbound I-580 instruct travelers to take I-205, SR 120, and SR 99 to reach Modesto instead of using the direct, but non-freeway, route SR 132. I-205 also serves to connect the Bay Area with popular weekend destinations such as Yosemite National Park, Reno, and Lake Tahoe. The Altamont Corridor Express provides commuters with an alternate route over Altamont Pass to San Jose and San Francisco, the latter through a transfer to Bay Area Rapid Transit.

I-205 is part of the California Freeway and Expressway System and is part of the National Highway System, a network of highways that are considered essential to the country's economy, defense, and mobility by the Federal Highway Administration. It is officially designated as the Robert T. Monagan Freeway, after the California legislator who represented the area from 1961 to 1973.

== History ==
When the Department of Engineering laid out the initial state highway system after the state's voters approved a bond issue to pay for it in 1910, they included Route 5, connecting Santa Cruz and Oakland with Stockton via Altamont Pass. San Joaquin County paved the portion near Tracy with asphalt with their own bond issue, passed in 1909, and the state later resurfaced it with concrete. In addition, the new concrete road bypassed Banta, which the old county road had passed through via Banta Road, F Street, and Grant Line Road. Otherwise, the road was relatively direct, coming down from Altamont Pass onto Grant Line Road, following Byron Highway into Tracy and leaving east and northeasterly on 11th Street to the San Joaquin River at the Mossdale Crossing. The Lincoln Highway Association chose this route in 1913 for their transcontinental highway, where it remained until the Carquinez Bridge opened in 1927, creating a shorter route via Vallejo. In 1926, the American Association of State Highway Officials designated the Stockton–Bay Area route as US 48, which was absorbed by an extension of US 50 by the early 1930s.

A 1938 four-lane bypass of the old road around Altamont Pass was extended east to Tracy as a four-lane expressway on November 16, 1954. By then, the entire route between the Bay Area and Stockton was four or more lanes, following the present I-580 (eastbound lanes where they separate), I-205, 11th Street, and I-5 from Livermore through Tracy to Stockton. During early planning for the Interstate Highway System, the main north–south route through California (now I-5) was to use SR 99 through the San Joaquin Valley; a connection to the Bay Area split near Modesto and roughly followed US 50. The Bureau of Public Roads approved a move to the proposed Westside Freeway in May 1957, and, in November, they added a North Tracy Bypass that would connect I-5 and I-580. Construction began in the late 1960s, incorporating part of the 1954 expressway and a new alignment bypassing Tracy to the north, and the $14-million (equivalent to $87 million in 2024) road opened to traffic on December 21, 1970. (A short piece at the west end, including the bridge over the California Aqueduct, was upgraded several years earlier when I-580 and I-5 to the south were built.)

Since 1970, I-205 has seen few changes. The largest have been widening from four to six lanes west of I-205 Bus. in 1999 and converting two diamond interchanges to partial cloverleafs—Grant Line Road in about 1997 and Mountain House Parkway in 2007 (including ramp meters). As of mid-2009, I-205 has been widened to six lanes (three in each direction) for its entire route. Also, the 1970s concrete pavement has been resurfaced with fresh asphalt from the junction of I-5 to due east of the 11th street connector ramp.

== Future ==
The California Department of Transportation (Caltrans) has plans to improve merging distances by constructing auxiliary lanes between the interchanges and to add new interchanges at Lammers Road and Paradise Road. Caltrans is also planning to add one high-occupancy vehicle (HOV) lane in each direction between I-580 and I-5.

== Exit list ==
County	Location	mi	km	Exit	Destinations	Notes
Alameda		0.00	0.00	—	I-580 west (Arthur H. Breed Jr. Freeway) – San Francisco	No access to I-580 east; western terminus; I-580 east exit 65
San Joaquin	Mountain House	2.31	3.72	2	International Parkway, Mountain House Parkway	International Parkway connects to I-580 east – Los Angeles
San Joaquin	Tracy	4.30	6.92	4	Eleventh Street (I-205 BL) – Tracy	Eastbound exit and westbound entrance; I-205 Bus. unsigned; former US 50 east
San Joaquin	Tracy	6.26	10.07	6	Grant Line Road (CR J4) / Naglee Road	
San Joaquin	Tracy	7.94	12.78	8	Tracy Boulevard (CR J13)	Serves Sutter Tracy Community Hospital
San Joaquin	Tracy	9.05	14.56	9	MacArthur Drive	
San Joaquin	Lathrop	12.97	20.87	—	I-5 north – Stockton	No access to I-5 south; eastern terminus; I-5 south exit 458B
1.000 mi = 1.609 km; 1.000 km = 0.621 mi: Incomplete access

== Tracy business loop ==
Interstate 205 Business
- Eleventh Street
- Location: Tracy

Interstate 205 Business (I-205 Bus.) is a locally maintained business route. It locally follows 11th Street, the historic four-lane alignment of US 50, through Tracy. The route begins at a split with I-205 west of the city. After passing through downtown Tracy, it curves northeast at a junction with former SR 33, which has been truncated to the south at I-5. The final stretch of I-205 Bus. runs diagonally to a merge with I-5, which comes from the south and continues northeast along the former US 50 alignment. The east end of I-205 Bus. is about 0.75 miles (1.21 km) southwest of the end of I-205; normally, I-205 Bus. would return to I-205 at both ends, but, here, I-205 and I-205 Bus. both end at I-5.

Major intersections

The entire route is in San Joaquin County.

Location	mi	km	Destinations	Notes
	0.0	0.0	I-205 west	Interchange; western terminus; no access to I-205 east; I-205 east exit 4; former US 50 west
Tracy	1.4	2.3	Lammers Road	
Tracy	2.7	4.3	Corral Hollow Road (CR J2)	
Tracy	3.6	5.8	Tracy Boulevard (CR J13 north)	Southern terminus of CR J13; serves Sutter Tracy Community Hospital
	5.7	9.2	Chrisman Road	
	6.7	10.8	Banta Road	Commercial vehicles over 7 tons prohibited
	7.2	11.6	Lovely Road – Patterson, Modesto	Eastbound exit only interchange; at-grade intersection westbound; one-way eastbound; former SR 33 south; connects to Bird Road
	8.6	13.8	Grant Line Road, Kasson Road (CR J4) to I-5 south – Banta	Roundabout; serves Deuel Vocational Institution
	9.6	15.4	I-5 north – Manteca, Stockton	Interchange; eastern terminus; no access to I-5 south; access to I-5 south is via Kasson Road; I-5 south exit 458A; former US 50 east
1.000 mi = 1.609 km; 1.000 km = 0.621 mi: Incomplete access
