= Tracy Unified School District =

School district in California

Address
- 1875 West Lowell Avenue Tracy, California, 95376; United States

District information
- Type: Public
- Grades: K–12
- Superintendent: Dr. Robert Pecot
- NCES District ID: 0600047

Students and staff
- Students: 14,287 (2020–2021)
- Teachers: 617.71 (FTE)
- Staff: 638.33 (FTE)
- Student–teacher ratio: 23.13:1

Other information
- Website: www.tracy.k12.ca.us

Tracy Unified School District is a public school district that serves most of the city of Tracy, as well as the unincorporated community of Holt, in San Joaquin County, California, United States. As of 2024-2025 school year, there were 22 schools in the district. The district serves approximately 16,000 students in the area.

== History ==
In 2020 Tracy USD, the Banta Elementary School District, and the San Joaquin County Office of Education (SJCOE) agreed that voters in Banta ESD would be offered a referendum on becoming a unified K-12 school district; previously Tracy USD provided high school education to Banta USD. Dan Moore, the superintendent of Banta ESD, stated that the Tracy district leadership gave consent to the unification plans. On July 1, 2021, the Banta district converted into a unified school district, the Banta Unified School District, and so Tracy USD no longer covered that area for high school.

== Attendance boundary ==
For all grades K-12, the district includes most of the city of Tracy.

It also includes high school only for areas in the Jefferson Elementary School District, which includes southern parts of Tracy; and the New Jerusalem Elementary School District.

Previously it covered high school for areas in what was then the Banta Elementary School District, this included a small portion of Tracy and western Lathrop.

== Schools ==
=== High schools ===
- John C. Kimball High School
- Tracy High School
- Merrill F. West High School

=== K-8 schools ===
- Art Freiler School
- George Kelly School
- North School
- Gladys Poet-Christian School

=== Middle schools ===
- Monte Vista Middle School
- Earle E. Williams Middle School

=== Elementary schools ===
- Louis Bohn Elementary School
- Central Elementary School
- Wanda Hirsch Elementary School
- Mellville S. Jacobson Elementary School
- McKinley Elementary School
- South/West Park Elementary School
- Louis Villalovoz Elementary School

=== Alternative schools ===
- George and Evelyn Stein Continuation High School
- Duncan-Russell Community Day School
- Tracy Adult School
- Willow Community Day School (7-12)

=== Charter schools ===
- Tracy Learning Center (K-12)
  - Primary Charter (K-4)
  - Discovery Middle (5-8)
  - Millennium High (9-12)
- Tracy Charter School (K-12)

=== Defunct schools ===
- H Alfred Clover Middle School
