= Tracy, California =

City in California, United States

- City
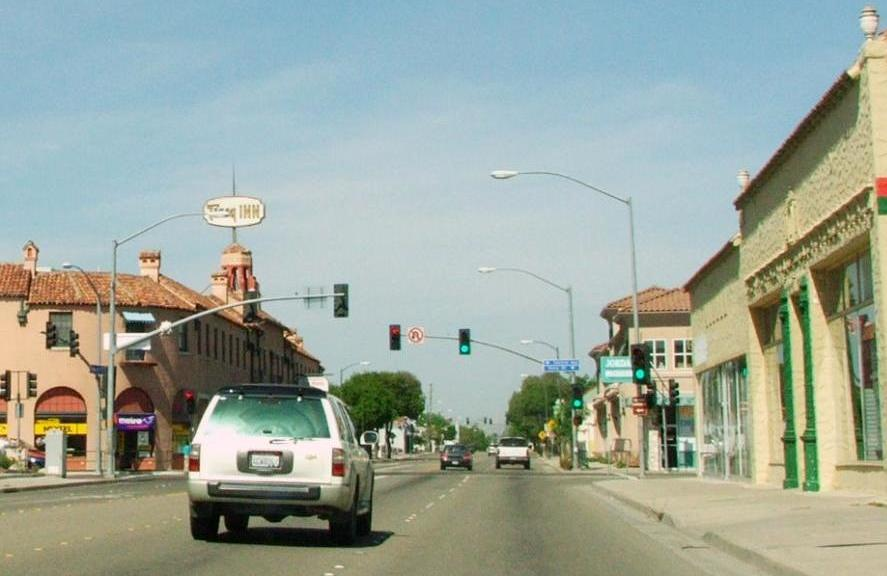
- Holly Drive in Tracy

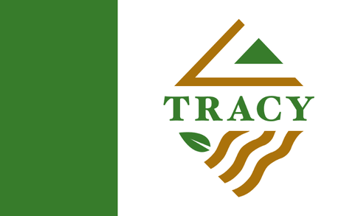
- Flag
- Motto: Think Inside the Triangle
- Location in San Joaquin County and the state of California
- Interactive map of Tracy, California
- Location in California Location in the United States
- Coordinates: 37°44′23″N 121°25′34″W
- Country: United States
- State: California
- County: San Joaquin
- Incorporated: July 22, 1910

Government
  - Type: City Manager
  - Mayor: Dan Arriola
  - Manager: Midori Lichtwardt
  - State senator: Jerry McNerney (D)
  - Assembly member: Rhodesia Ransom (D)
  - U. S. rep.: Josh Harder (D)

Area
  - Total: 26.02 sq mi (67.40 km^{2})
  - Land: 25.89 sq mi (67.05 km^{2})
  - Water: 0.14 sq mi (0.35 km^{2}) 0.52%
- Elevation: 52 ft (16 m)

Population (2020)
  - Total: 93,000
  - Estimate (2025): 101,901
  - Rank: 73rd in California
  - Density: 3,600/sq mi (1,400/km^{2})
- Time zone: UTC−8 (Pacific)
  - Summer (DST): UTC−7 (PDT)
- ZIP codes: 95304, 95376–95378, 95385, 95391
- Area code: 209
- FIPS code: 06-80238
- GNIS feature IDs: 277621, 2412090
- Website: cityoftracy.org

Tracy is the second-most populous city in San Joaquin County, California, United States. Its population was 93,000 at the 2020 census and estimated at 101,901 in 2025. Tracy is located inside a geographic triangle formed by Interstate 205 on the north side of the city, Interstate 5 to the east, and Interstate 580 to the southwest.

== History ==
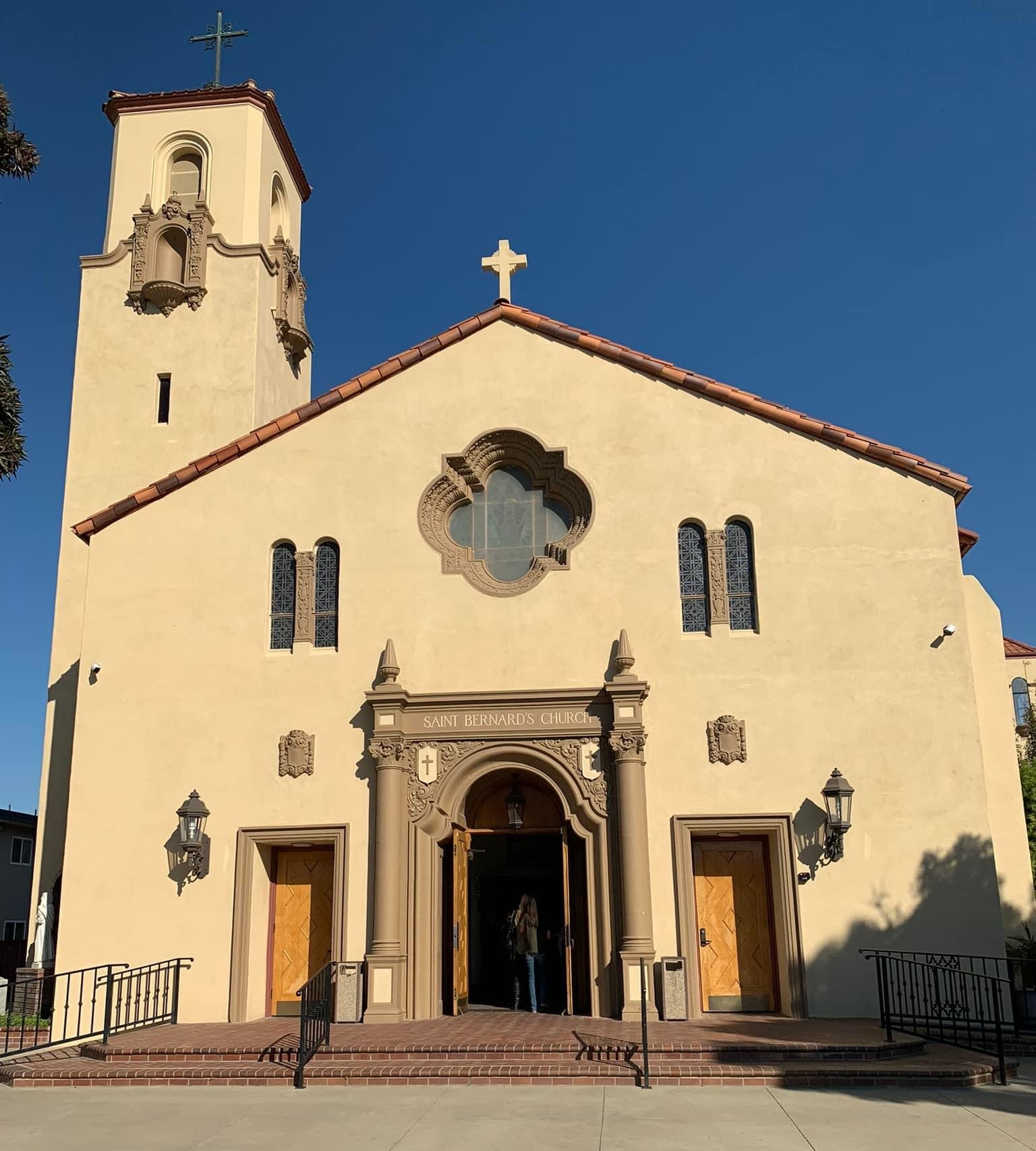
St. Bernard Catholic Church, founded in 1908, and built in a Spanish Colonial Revival style in 1951.

Until the 1760s, the area that became the city of Tracy was long populated by the Yokuts ethnic group of loosely associated bands of Native Americans and their ancestors. They lived on hunting and gathering game and fish from local rivers and creeks. After encountering the Spanish colonists, the Yokuts suffered from new infectious diseases, which caused social disruption, as did the Spanish efforts to impress them into labor at Mission San José. Mexican and American explorers later arrived, pushing the Yokuts out. The Yokuts people remain, living in small groups with about 2,600 people identifying as Yokut. Along with them, another language group of Native Americans found near Tracy are referred to as the Mono people, numbering around 1,800.

Tracy is a railroad town that came from the mid-19th century construction, mainly by Chinese laborers, of Central Pacific Railroad rail lines running from Sacramento through Stockton to the San Francisco Bay Area, beginning 1868 and ending September 1878 with the opening of a new branch and junction. A number of small communities sprang up along these lines at designated station sites, including one at the junction named for railroad director J. J. Tracy.

Incorporated in 1911, Tracy grew rapidly and prospered as the center of an agricultural area, even when larger railroad operations began to decline in the 1950s. Competition with trucking and automobiles resulted in widespread railroad restructuring. Tracy is part of the San Jose-San Francisco-Oakland, CA Combined Statistical Area, an extension of the Bay Area.

In December 1969, the town of Tracy hosted the Altamont Free Concert, held at the later closed Altamont Raceway Park. An estimated 300,000 people gathered at the speedway infield in an event that was plagued by violence among attendees, many of whom were drunk or drugged. Artists featured included the British Rolling Stones and the California bands Santana, Jefferson Airplane, the Flying Burrito Brothers and Crosby, Stills, Nash & Young.

Tracy was the headquarters of a branch of the American Nazi Party. Increased activity was reported by the media in 1972, with the appearance of graffiti spray-painted Nazi swastikas and the words "White Power". A surplus army 2½-ton 6×6 truck with swastika symbols was seen carrying neo-Nazi recruits around town. Members handed out flyers printed with "Join the National Socialist White People’s Party" and a Tracy-based post office box mailing address. The television program 60 Minutes aired a report in 1978 titled "The California Reich" with an interview of a Tracy resident who was a neo-Nazi leader. After about a decade, most of the city's neo-Nazis moved to Oroville, California.

On August 7, 1998, a tire fire ignited at S.F. Royster's Tire Disposal south of Tracy at 29425 South MacArthur Drive, near Linne Road. The tire dump held more than 7 million illegally stored tires and was allowed to burn for over two years before it was extinguished. Allowing the fire to burn was considered to be a better way to avoid groundwater contamination than putting it out. The cleanup of chemicals released by the fire cost $16.2 million. The chemicals were found to have contaminated groundwater in the region.

On June 1, 2024, the city got national attention as the Corral Fire ignited south of Tracy. It was the first wildfire of 2024 to burn over 2,000 acres. The fire started at Site 300 of the Lawrence Livermore National Laboratory. The fire grew fast, as on the same day, it went from 30 acres at around 4:30pm, to 4,940 acres at around 7:50pm. By the end of the day, CAL FIRE Santa Clara Unit was assigned to the wildfire.

The next day, June 2, 2024, two firefighters were injured and the fire reached 12,500 acres. It reached peak size at 6:52 pm, standing at 14,168 acres. Two-hundred households were evacuated. On June 3, 2024, with the fire still at peak size, CAL FIRE assigned 45 engines, 15 water tenders, 16 dozers, 14 hand crews, and 40 other vehicles, totaling 475 personnel. By that evening, one house was destroyed in a small neighborhood, just south of Interstate 580 and State Route 132.

On June 6, 2024, the fire was declared 100% contained. In the chaos of those last five days, two firefighters were injured, one structure was destroyed, and costed an estimated $3.5 million (2024 USD) to suppress.

On June 11, 2026, a five-alarm fire erupted at a 1-million-square-foot Medline Inc. distribution center in Tracy. The blaze completely destroyed the facility, creating thick plumes of toxic black smoke that were visible across the region, which drifted as far south as the California central coast, and caused charred debris to fall over nearby neighborhoods. The cause of the fire remains under investigation.

== Geography ==
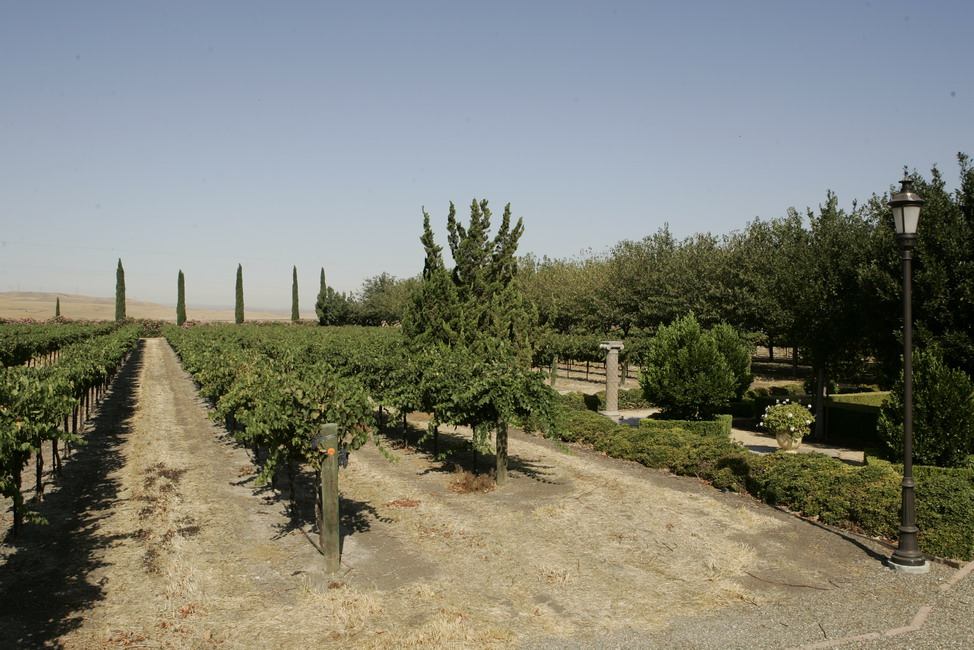
Tracy vineyard

Located in the Central Valley, Tracy is near both fertile and (due to a region of hills west of Tracy) infertile agricultural lands. Tracy has a Mediterranean climate.

Some of this land (in the east and mostly north of Tracy because of the moist Delta river system) has come under increasing development pressure. The San Francisco Bay Area's vigorous population growth has spilled over into the Tracy area as well as other locations, such as the new town of Mountain House. Tracy passed Measure A in 1990 in an attempt to contain and limit development.

In an effort to reduce environmental impacts of the city, it launched the Emerald Tracy Project in September 2009. City spokesman Matt Robinson said that if it succeeds, Tracy will be the second city after Riverside, California to satisfy the state's goal for sustainable communities.

=== Climate ===
Tracy features a semi-arid climate (Köppen BSk), with cool, moist winters and very hot and dry summers, displaying Mediterranean characteristics. December and January are the coolest months, and average around 47.1 °F (8.4 °C), and there are 19 nights with lows at or below freezing annually, with the coldest night of the year typically bottoming out below 30 °F (−1 °C). July is the warmest month, averaging 76.4 °F (24.7 °C); normally, there are 18 days of 100 °F (38 °C)+ highs and 82 days of 90 °F (32 °C)+ highs. Average annual precipitation is around 12.5 in (320 mm), which, by definition, results in the area being classified as a semi-desert.

Climate data for Tracy Pumping Plant, California (1991–2020 normals, extremes 1955–present)
Month	Jan	Feb	Mar	Apr	May	Jun	Jul	Aug	Sep	Oct	Nov	Dec	Year
Record high °F (°C)	74 (23)	80 (27)	91 (33)	97 (36)	107 (42)	112 (44)	112 (44)	111 (44)	112 (44)	103 (39)	85 (29)	74 (23)	112 (44)
Mean maximum °F (°C)	65.5 (18.6)	70.6 (21.4)	78.3 (25.7)	88.0 (31.1)	95.6 (35.3)	103.1 (39.5)	104.6 (40.3)	103.3 (39.6)	100.1 (37.8)	91.0 (32.8)	77.1 (25.1)	66.4 (19.1)	106.3 (41.3)
Mean daily maximum °F (°C)	54.7 (12.6)	61.2 (16.2)	66.7 (19.3)	72.6 (22.6)	80.1 (26.7)	86.8 (30.4)	92.6 (33.7)	91.8 (33.2)	87.6 (30.9)	78.2 (25.7)	64.6 (18.1)	55.4 (13.0)	74.4 (23.5)
Daily mean °F (°C)	47.2 (8.4)	52.0 (11.1)	56.5 (13.6)	61.1 (16.2)	67.5 (19.7)	72.9 (22.7)	77.3 (25.2)	76.7 (24.8)	73.5 (23.1)	65.9 (18.8)	55.3 (12.9)	47.6 (8.7)	62.8 (17.1)
Mean daily minimum °F (°C)	39.6 (4.2)	42.9 (6.1)	46.3 (7.9)	49.6 (9.8)	54.9 (12.7)	59.1 (15.1)	62.0 (16.7)	61.6 (16.4)	59.5 (15.3)	53.6 (12.0)	45.9 (7.7)	39.9 (4.4)	51.2 (10.7)
Mean minimum °F (°C)	30.3 (−0.9)	34.2 (1.2)	37.6 (3.1)	40.8 (4.9)	48.1 (8.9)	51.9 (11.1)	54.9 (12.7)	54.7 (12.6)	52.4 (11.3)	45.5 (7.5)	35.4 (1.9)	29.3 (−1.5)	27.1 (−2.7)
Record low °F (°C)	18 (−8)	23 (−5)	25 (−4)	29 (−2)	34 (1)	37 (3)	44 (7)	42 (6)	40 (4)	30 (−1)	24 (−4)	17 (−8)	17 (−8)
Average precipitation inches (mm)	2.50 (64)	2.40 (61)	1.78 (45)	0.79 (20)	0.50 (13)	0.10 (2.5)	trace	0.03 (0.76)	0.23 (5.8)	0.74 (19)	1.61 (41)	2.20 (56)	12.88 (328.06)
Average precipitation days (≥ 0.01 in)	12.0	10.0	8.5	4.5	2.4	0.7	0.1	0.2	0.7	2.6	7.1	10.7	59.5
Source: NOAA

== Demographics ==
Historical population
Census	Pop.	Note	%±
1910	596		—
1920	1,238		107.7%
1930	3,829		209.3%
1940	4,056		5.9%
1950	8,410		107.3%
1960	11,289		34.2%
1970	14,724		30.4%
1980	18,428		25.2%
1990	33,558		82.1%
2000	56,929		69.6%
2010	82,922		45.7%
2020	93,000		12.2%
2025 (est.)	101,901	▲	9.6%
U.S. Decennial Census

=== Racial and ethnic composition ===
Tracy, California – Racial and ethnic composition Note: the US Census treats Hispanic/Latino as an ethnic category. This table excludes Latinos from the racial categories and assigns them to a separate category. Hispanics/Latinos may be of any race.
Race / Ethnicity (NH = Non-Hispanic)	Pop 2000	Pop 2010	Pop 2020	% 2000	% 2010	% 2020
White alone (NH)	30,723	30,005	25,117	53.97%	36.18%	27.01%
Black or African American alone (NH)	2,976	5,636	5,737	5.23%	6.80%	6.17%
Native American or Alaska Native alone (NH)	297	297	310	0.52%	0.36%	0.33%
Asian alone (NH)	4,481	11,803	19,339	7.87%	14.23%	20.79%
Pacific Islander alone (NH)	275	641	897	0.48%	0.77%	0.96%
Other race alone (NH)	182	223	634	0.32%	0.27%	0.68%
Mixed race or Multiracial (NH)	2,230	3,760	4,969	3.92%	4.53%	5.34%
Hispanic or Latino (any race)	15,765	30,557	35,997	27.69%	36.85%	38.71%
Total	56,929	82,922	93,000	100.00%	100.00%	100.00%

=== 2020 census ===
As of the 2020 census, Tracy had a population of 93,000. The population density was 3,592.3 inhabitants per square mile (1,387.0/km^{2}). The racial makeup of Tracy was 33.8% White, 6.4% African American, 1.3% Native American, 21.2% Asian, 1.1% Pacific Islander, 19.4% from other races, and 16.7% from two or more races. Hispanic or Latino of any race were 38.7% of the population.

The census reported that 99.6% of the population lived in households, 0.2% lived in non-institutionalized group quarters, and 0.2% were institutionalized. 99.4% of residents lived in urban areas, while 0.6% lived in rural areas.

There were 27,595 households, out of which 45.8% included children under the age of 18, 59.3% were married-couple households, 6.4% were cohabiting couple households, 19.7% had a female householder with no partner present, and 14.6% had a male householder with no partner present. 13.6% of households were one person, and 5.2% had someone living alone who was 65 years of age or older. The average household size was 3.36. There were 22,541 families (81.7% of all households).

The age distribution was 26.0% under the age of 18, 10.0% aged 18 to 24, 26.5% aged 25 to 44, 26.6% aged 45 to 64, and 10.8% who were 65 years of age or older. The median age was 35.7 years. For every 100 females, there were 99.4 males, and for every 100 females age 18 and over there were 97.6 males age 18 and over.

There were 28,436 housing units at an average density of 1,098.4 units per square mile (424.1 units/km^{2}), of which 27,595 (97.0%) were occupied. Of these, 63.0% were owner-occupied, and 37.0% were occupied by renters. 3.0% of housing units were vacant; the homeowner vacancy rate was 0.9% and the rental vacancy rate was 3.6%.

=== 2023 ACS 5-year estimates ===
In 2023, the US Census Bureau estimated that the median household income in 2023 was $118,253, and the per capita income was $42,884. About 5.9% of families and 7.7% of the population were below the poverty line.

=== 2010 census ===
The 2010 United States census reported that Tracy had a population of 82,922. The population density was 3,745.5 inhabitants per square mile (1,446.1/km^{2}). The racial makeup of Tracy was 43,724 (52.7%) White, 5,953 (7.2%) African American, 715 (0.9%) Native American, 12,229 (14.7%) Asian, 747 (0.9%) Pacific Islander, 13,173 (15.9%) from other races, and 6,381 (7.7%) from two or more races. Hispanic or Latino of any race were 30,557 persons (36.9%).

The Census reported that 82,606 people (99.6% of the population) lived in households, 69 (0.1%) lived in non-institutionalized group quarters, and 247 (0.3%) were institutionalized.

There were 24,331 households, out of which 13,143 (54.0%) had children under the age of 18 living in them, 15,122 (62.2%) were opposite-sex married couples living together, 3,196 (13.1%) had a female householder with no husband present, and 1,627 (6.7%) had a male householder with no wife present. There were 1,501 (6.2%) unmarried opposite-sex partnerships, and 184 (0.8%) same-sex married couples or partnerships. 3,326 households (13.7%) were made up of individuals, and 1,026 (4.2%) had someone living alone who was 65 years of age or older. The average household size was 3.40. There were 19,945 families (82.0% of all households); the average family size was 3.72.

The population was spread out, with 26,668 people (32.2%) under the age of 18, 7,476 people (9.0%) aged 18 to 24, 23,826 people (28.7%) aged 25 to 44, 19,202 people (23.2%) aged 45 to 64, and 5,750 people (6.9%) who were 65 years of age or older. The median age was 32.3 years. For every 100 females, there were 98.3 males. For every 100 females age 18 and over, there were 94.9 males.

There were 25,963 housing units at an average density of 1,172.7 units per square mile (452.8 units/km^{2}), of which 16,163 (66.4%) were owner-occupied, and 8,168 (33.6%) were occupied by renters. The homeowner vacancy rate was 2.5%; the rental vacancy rate was 5.9%. 54,275 people (65.5% of the population) lived in owner-occupied housing units and 28,331 people (34.2%) lived in rental housing units.

== Arts and culture ==
=== Historical monuments ===
Tracy City Hall and Jail was first commissioned by the city in November–December 1899 and completed in March 1900 after the original Jail and city hall was burnt down. This historical site served as the local governments place of operation during Tracy's formative years, which makes this building an integral part of Tracy's foundation. The structure is made of a simple brick building that is 24 by 43 feet in dimension located on 25 West Seventh Street, and was built by J.F. Hoerl. In the historical resources inventory, the Tracy City Hall and Jail was one of only fourteen buildings to receive and "exceptional" rating.

The Tracy Inn was originally opened in 1927 with a total of 60 rooms on the second floor and is still located on 24 West Eleventh Street. The building has a very transitional architectural style befitting the 1920s with a classic Spanish Colonial revival and modern styles mixed together. The building was designed by the Oakland firm of Slocomhe and Tuttle. In 1949, after the ownership changed, the Tracy Inn suffered with a fire that burned the only original blue prints of the building. Even with this loss the owner was still able to recreate the original look of the Tracy Inn. The iconic sign of the Tracy Inn has also been replaced in 1945.

== Government ==
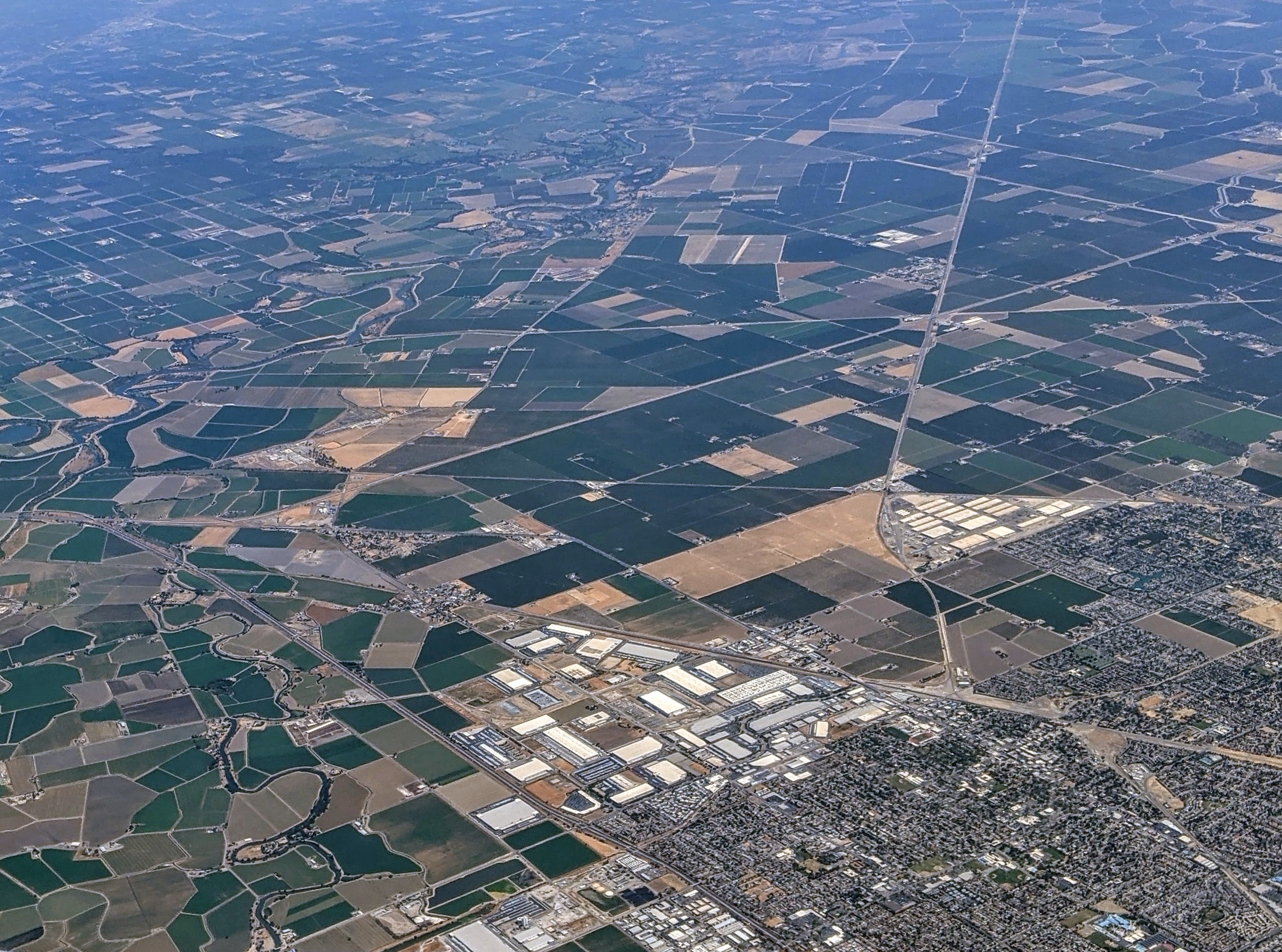
Aerial view of the northeastern part of Tracy (lower right) and land to the south and east, in 2021. The warehouse distribution and fulfillment centers in the northeast corner of the city are at lower center. Behind and to the right is the Defense Logistic Agency's Tracy Defense Distribution Depot (which is just outside Tracy to the east).

The United States Postal Service operates the Tracy Post Office and the Tracy Carrier Annex.

The California Department of Corrections and Rehabilitation operates the Deuel Vocational Institution, a state prison, in unincorporated San Joaquin County, near Tracy.

The Tracy Defense Distribution Depot began its operations back in 1942, and has since been a main supply for American troops for all major wars since World War II. The distribution depot has around 30 warehouses and is a major employer for the area, just under Safeway.

In the United States House of Representatives, most of Tracy is in California's 9th congressional district and is represented by Democrat Josh Harder, and the southeast corner of Tracy is in California's 13th congressional district and is represented by Democrat Adam Gray.

== Education ==
Several public school districts include portions of the city of Tracy. The largest is the Tracy Unified School District. This school system incorporates many elementary and middle schools as well as five Tracy high schools: Tracy High School, Merrill F. West High School, Delta Charter High School, Millennium Charter High School, Tracy Independent Study Charter School and John C. Kimball High School. Tracy USD's students with behavioral issues attend the Willow Community Day School, and the Tracy One Program, or Community One.

Jefferson School District is an elementary school district covering southern parts of Tracy. Areas in Jefferson SD are zoned to Tracy USD for high school. The latter covers the south side of Tracy and includes four schools: Jefferson Middle School, Tom Hawkins Elementary School, Monticello Elementary School and Anthony C. Traina School.

Lammersville Joint Unified School District covers a portion of Tracy to the west. It includes six K-8 schools (Peter Hansen Elementary, Julius Cordes Elementary, Wicklund Elementary, Bethany Elementary, Questa Elementary, and Altamont Elementary) along with Mountain House High School, which was opened in 2014.

An eastern part of the Tracy city limits is within the Banta Unified School District; it was previously known as the Banta Elementary School District, and Tracy USD covered the Banta ESD area for high school. On July 1, 2021, the Banta district converted into a unified school district.

== Media ==
Tracy's daily newspaper is the Tracy Press, a once-weekly newspaper. Bilingual Weekly News covers Tracy in English and Spanish.

== Infrastructure ==
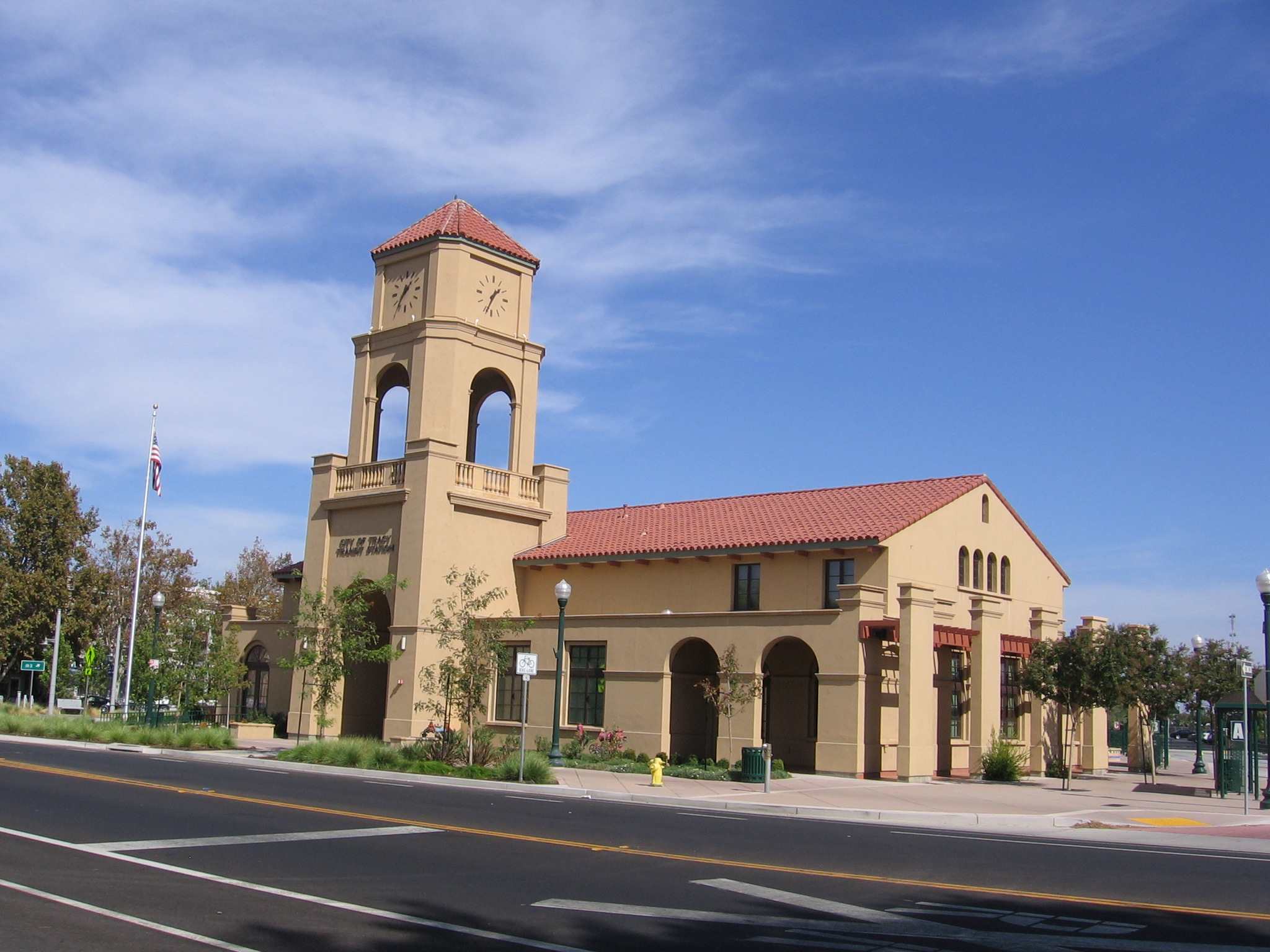
Transit center

=== Transportation ===
==== Public transportation ====
Tracy is served by several bus services: locally, Tracer runs seven lines that serve as circulators between major transit hubs, shopping, school, residential, and downtown areas. San Joaquin Regional Transit District (SJRTD) runs two county hopper routes that connect the city with other San Joaquin County communities and one commuter route that runs to Dublin/Pleasanton BART station.

Greyhound, Tracer, and SJRTD all connect with taxis, bike stations, and parking at the Tracy Transit Center, a transit station built in 2010. Amtrak Thruway buses serve the city's bus station to connect the area with six daily trips to the South Bay and two to San Francisco, all of which stop at BART and job centers in Livermore.

South Tracy offers the Altamont Corridor Express (ACE) service at Tracy (ACE station), which provides commuter rail transportation to the Bay Area and connects with VTA in San Jose, BART via shuttle in Pleasanton and Fremont, in addition to Amtrak train in Santa Clara and San Jose. Valley Link is planned to pass through Tracy and provide a passenger rail service connecting directly to BART. Intercity passenger rail service to Tracy ended in 1971 with the formation of Amtrak.

==== Major highways ====
Interstate 205 passes along the north side of the city and connects the nearby Interstates 580 to the west and 5 on the east, with the three Interstates forming a triangle around much of the city. Business Loop 205 runs through the center of Tracy along 11th Street, formerly a portion of U.S. Highway 50. In addition, the northern terminus of State Highway 33 is located at South Bird Road and Interstate 5 southeast of Tracy.

==== Aviation ====
Tracy is served by Tracy Municipal Airport, located south of the city. It serves general aviation; there is no scheduled airline service from the airport.

== Notable people ==
- Cody Bolton – MLB pitcher (Pittsburgh Pirates)
- Sandra Cantu – homicide victim in 2009
- Keyshia Cole – American singer, songwriter, actress, and television producer
- Troy Dayak – soccer player/coach
- Nick Eddy – former NFL player
- Gilbert Fuentes – (born February 21, 2002) American professional soccer player for Austin Bold on loan from Major League Soccer San Jose Earthquakes.
- MC Hammer – American rapper, dancer, entertainer, actor, business entrepreneur
- Josh Harder – United States Representative
- Rod Lauren – singer/actor
- Thia Megia – singer, finalist on American Idol season ten.
- John Moore – racing driver
- Matt Overton – active NFL player- Jacksonville Jaguars
- Bubba Paris – former NFL football star
- Steve Perry – Singer from Journey (Banta)
- Ryan Philpott – racing driver
- Richard Pombo – former United States Representative
- Saweetie - American rapper/songwriter
- Keena Turner – football star

== In popular culture ==
- The parade scene in the film The Candidate, starring Robert Redford, was filmed in Tracy.
- The 1975 documentary The California Reich depicts members of the American Nazi Party living in Tracy.

== Sister cities ==
Tracy has been a sister city of Memuro, Hokkaido, Japan since 1989. The city is also a sister city of Velas in the Azores.

== See also ==
- List of largest California cities by population
