= List of North American rapid transit systems =

This is a list of North American rapid transit systems by ridership. These heavy rail or rapid transit systems are also known as metro or subway systems. This list of systems in North America does not include light rail, even when they are integrated with heavy rail. Daily and annual ridership figures are based on "average weekday unlinked passenger trips" (where transfers between lines are counted as two separate passenger "boardings" or "trips"), unless otherwise indicated. For metro systems in the United States (including Puerto Rico) and Canada, the annual ridership figures for 2025 and average weekday ridership figures for the First Quarter (Q1) of 2026 come from the American Public Transportation Association's (APTA) ridership reports statistics, unless otherwise noted. Ridership figures for Mexico come from the National Institute of Geography and Statistics (INEGI), specifically the Economy and Productive Sectors - Passenger Transit information. Ridership figures for the Dominican Republic come from the Directorate of Operations Santo Domingo Metro report for the year 2013.

	System	Country	City/area served	Annual ridership (2025)	Avg. daily weekday boardings (Q1 2026)	System length	Avg. daily boardings per mile (per kilometer) (Q3 2023)	Year opened	Stations	Lines
1	New York City Subway	USA	New York City	2,314,388,000	7,245,000	248 miles (399 km)	25,251 (15,781)	1904 (Note: The current system incorporates elevated sections built in 1870.)	472	24
2	Mexico City Metro	MEX	Mexico City	1,115,300,000	2,397,892	140.75 miles (226.5 km)	17,037 (10,648)	1969	195	12
3	Toronto subway	CAN	Toronto	331,789,000	1,087,000	62.2 miles (100.1 km)	20,305 (12,690)	1954	109	5
4	Montreal Metro	CAN	Montreal	311,929,200	1,003,800	43 miles (69 km)	21,816 (13,635)	1966	68	4
5	Washington Metro	USA	Washington, D.C. Metropolitan Area	188,549,700	545,900	129 miles (208 km)	3,683 (2,301)	1976	98	6
6	SkyTrain	CAN	Vancouver	146,789,800	450,400	49.5 miles (79.6 km)	9,030 (5,643)	1985	53	3
7	Chicago 'L'	USA	Chicago	135,202,800	385,500	102.8 miles (165.4 km)	3,780 (2,362)	1892	145	8
8	Metrorrey	MEX	Monterrey	138,709,000	380,024 (Note: This system does not have update data of the avg. daily weekday boardings, this number correspond to the regular average.)	25 miles (40 km)	25,605 (16,003)	1991	40	3
9	MBTA subway (Note: This rapid transit system is integrated with a light rail system; only the parts of the system that are rapid transit/metro, and that are not light rail, are counted in the statistics presented here.) (Blue, Orange, and Red Lines)	USA	Boston	101,054,600	326,500	39.5 miles (63.6 km)	7,187 (4,491)	1901	53	4
10	BART	USA	San Francisco; Bay Area	53,678,000	286,200	131.4 miles (211.5 km)	1,280 (800)	1972	50	6
11	SEPTA Metro (L, B, and M)	USA	Philadelphia	65,471,700	219,000	36.7 miles (59.1 km)	4,733 (2,958)	1907	75	3
12	PATH	USA	Jersey City, Newark, NJ	64,318,300	210,000	13.8 miles (22.2 km)	13,449 (8,405)	1908	13	5
13	MARTA rail	USA	Atlanta	30,373,600	136,900	48 miles (77 km)	1,952 (1,220)	1979	38	4
14	Panama Metro	PAN	Panama City	116,088,070	180,000	22.9 miles (36.9 km)	21,176 (13,235)	2014	31	2
15	Santo Domingo Metro	DO	Santo Domingo	104,003,341 (2022/2023)	284,941	17.0 miles (27.4 km)	10,461 (6,538)	2009	30	2
16	Metro Rail (B and D Lines)	USA	Los Angeles	20,990,600	61,000	17.4 miles (28.0 km)	3,667 (2,291)	1993	16	2
17	Miami Metrorail	USA	Miami	14,971,300	51,600	24.9 miles (40.1 km)	2,111 (1,319)	1984	23	2
18	PATCO Speedline	USA	Philadelphia	5,865,800	18,500	14.2 miles (22.9 km)	1,268 (792)	1936	14	1
19	Staten Island Railway	USA	New York City	5,437,400	19,000	14.0 miles (22.5 km)	1,279 (799)	1860	22	1
20	Baltimore Metro SubwayLink	USA	Baltimore	4,610,400	11,500	15.5 miles (24.9 km)	884 (552)	1983	14	1
21	RTA Rapid Transit (Red Line)	USA	Cleveland	2,860,500	7,600	19 miles (31 km)	553 (345)	1955	18	1
22	Tren Urbano	USA (Puerto Rico)	San Juan	4,438,400	20,900	10.7 miles (17.2 km)	1,318 (823)	2004	16	1
23	Skyline (Honolulu)	USA	Honolulu	1,696,800	9,200	16.1 mi (25.9 km)		2023	13	2

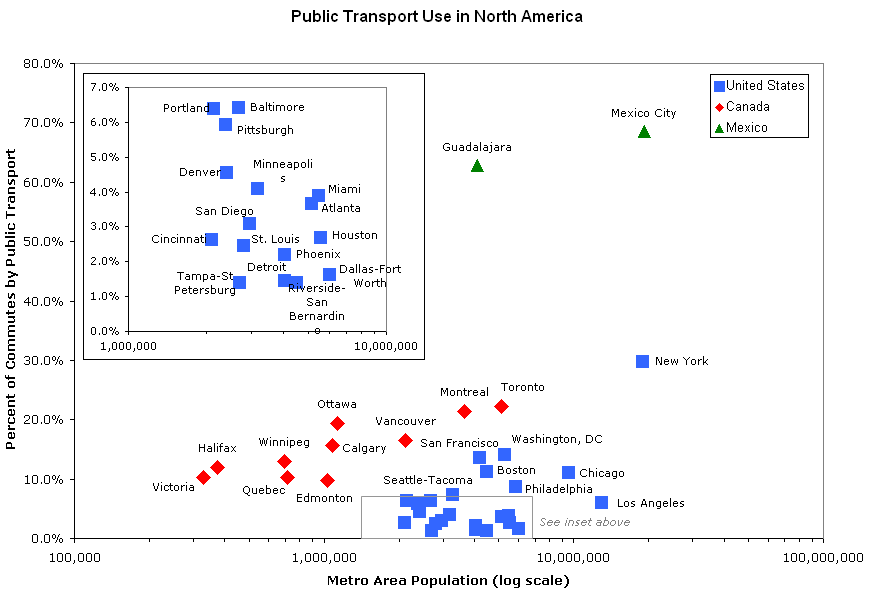
For a given population size, New York, some Mexican and Canadian cities tend to have higher public transit usage. Note: This data goes beyond rapid transit and encompasses all public transport, including modes such as buses.

== See also ==
- List of metro systems
- List of United States rapid transit systems by ridership
- List of Latin American rail transit systems by ridership
- List of tram and light rail transit systems
- List of North American light rail systems by ridership
- List of United States light rail systems by ridership
- List of suburban and commuter rail systems
- List of United States commuter rail systems by ridership
