= List of North American light rail systems =

In North America, the term light rail generally refers to urban rail systems that do not require full grade separation and can range from street-running to heavily grade separated networks. There is no universal definition of "light rail transit systems", so some systems (such as Toronto's) are technically streetcars rather than "true" light rail.

Daily ridership figures for American and Canadian light rail systems are defined as "average weekday unlinked passenger trips" (where transfers between lines are counted as two separate passenger "boardings" or "trips"), unless otherwise indicated. For light rail systems in the United States and Canada, these figures come from the American Public Transit Association (APTA)'s quarterly statistics. For Mexico, the figures are obtained from Banco de Información Económica's Instituto Nacional de Estadísitica y Geografía (INEGI), and the daily figures represent daily passenger trips averaged from the monthly and quarterly ridership figures. "Daily boardings per mile" figures have been rounded to the nearest 5 or 10.

== Systems ==
System	Country	City/Area served	Annual ridership (2025)	Avg. daily weekday boardings (weekdays, Q2 2026)	System length	Avg. daily boardings per mile (Q4 2024)	Year opened	Stations	Lines	Year last expanded
Sistema de Tren Eléctrico Urbano	MEX	Guadalajara	168,603,000	449,362 (Note: This is the Average Daily Ridership figure, not an "Average Weekday Ridership" figure – it is averaged from the 2025Q2 Total Ridership figure for this system.)	47.0 km (29.2 mi)	15,432	1989	48	3	2020
CTrain	CAN	Calgary	94,097,200	156,100	59.9 km (37.2 mi)	7,212	1981	45	2	2014
Toronto streetcar system	CAN	Toronto	79,295,000	368,500	82 km (51 mi)	4,622	1861	708	11	2016
Metro Rail light rail: (Note: This system also has a heavy rail rapid transit/metro portion (see List of metro systems); the ridership figures and statistics here represent the light rail portion of the system only.); A, C, E, & K lines	USA	Los Angeles	47,773,700	159,400	169.3 km (105.2 mi)	1,672	1990	98	4	2025
San Diego Trolley (incl. Silver Line (Note: This line or system is operated using heritage streetcars.))	USA	San Diego	41,069,900	130,000	105 km (65 mi)	1,958	1981	62	4	2021
MBTA light rail: Green Line & Mattapan Line	USA	Boston	42,065,000	135,500	42 km (26 mi)	3,903	1897; 1929	74	2	2022
Link light rail: 1 Line, 2 Line, and T Line	USA	Seattle and Tacoma	37,763,800	169,300	75.88 km (47.15 mi)	2,686	2003	51	3	2026
Mexico City Light Rail	MEX	Mexico City	29,545,000	96,835	13.04 km (8.10 mi)	12,010	1986	18	1	2008
Muni Metro (incl. F Market)	USA	San Francisco	34,229,500	125,100	57.5 km (35.7 mi)	2,661	1980	152	8	2023
Edmonton LRT	CAN	Edmonton	31,611,400	99,600	37.3 km (23.2 mi)	4,720	1978	29	3	2024
MAX Light Rail	USA	Portland, Oregon	22,061,900	66,300	97 km (60 mi)	1,232	1986	94	5	2015
DART rail	USA	Dallas	21,611,600	65,300	192 km (119 mi)	771	1996	73	5	2025
NJ Transit Light Rail	USA	Newark, New Jersey, as well as Hudson, Mercer, Burlington, and Camden Counties.	22,789,400	65,312	174.0 km (108.1 mi)	578	1935	86	3	2011
O-Train	CAN	Ottawa	26,523,100	89,500	35.6 km (22.1 mi)	9,820	2019	25	3	2025
METRO Light Rail	USA	Minneapolis	12,848,200	37,100	35.1 km (21.8 mi)	2,045	2004	37	2	2014
SEPTA Metro light rail: Subway–Surface Trolleys (T), Media–Sharon Hill Line (D), & Route 15 Trolley (G)	USA	Philadelphia	15,626,500	55,800	110.1 km (68.4 mi)	816	1858	>100	8	2005
TRAX (light rail)	USA	Salt Lake City	13,279,100	40,300	72.1 km (44.8 mi)	1,002	1999	50	3	2013
METRORail	USA	Houston	12,651,100	37,700	36.9 km (22.9 mi)	1,843	2004	37	3	2015
RTD Light Rail	USA	Denver	10,568,000	42,300	94.1 km (58.5 mi)	646	1994	46	6	2017
Valley Metro Rail	USA	Phoenix	11,100,300	33,700	62 km (38.5 mi)	823	2008	50	2	2025
St. Louis MetroLink	USA	St. Louis	7,665,000	21,800	74.0 km (46.0 mi)	413	1993	37	2	2006
Lynx Rapid Transit Services	USA	Charlotte, North Carolina	6,403,100	19,300	30.4 km (18.9 mi)	1,143	2007	15	1	2018
SacRT light rail	USA	Sacramento, California	7,410,000	22,900	69.0 km (42.9 mi)	455	1987	54	3	2015
Streetcars in New Orleans	USA	New Orleans	3,136,500	10,400	35.9 km (22.3 mi)	412	1835	streetcar-like surface stops	4	2013
VTA light rail	USA	San Jose, California	4,469,300	17,700	67.9 km (42.2 mi)	374	1987	62	3	2005
Baltimore Light RailLink	USA	Baltimore	5,015,100	17,600	53.1 km (33.0 mi)	460	1992	33	3	1997
Ion rapid transit	CAN	Kitchener and Waterloo	5,654,810	13,000	19.3 km (12.0 mi)	1,083	2019	19	1	n/a
Morgantown Personal Rapid Transit	USA	Morgantown	-	12,000	5.0 km (3.1 mi)		1975	5	1	1979
The T: Pittsburgh Light Rail	USA	Pittsburgh	3,104,400	9,964	42.2 km (26.2 mi)	344	1984	53	3	2012
San Francisco cable car system (Note: It is debatable whether this system truly qualifies as "light rail" (or as a true "transit" system either), but it is included in the table anyway for comparison purposes (and due to its ridership statistics being tracked by APTA).)	USA	San Francisco	5,719,900	14,900	8.4 km (5.2 mi)	2,685	1878	streetcar-like surface stops	3	1952
Portland Streetcar (Note: This system is owned by the City of Portland, which is not a member of APTA, and its ridership figures are not included in the APTA statistics for Portland.)	USA	Portland	2,373,341	8,339	11.83 km (7.35 mi)	1,135	2001	76	2	2012
Buffalo Metro Rail	USA	Buffalo, New York	2,433,300	6,600	10.3 km (6.4 mi)	254	1985	14	1	2025
KC Streetcar (Note: This system is owned the by City of Kansas City, which is not a member of APTA, and its ridership figures are not included in the APTA statistics for Kansas City.)	USA	Kansas City, Missouri	1,856,129	4,393	10.3 km (6.4 mi)	1,996	2016	19	1	2026
SPRINTER	USA	Oceanside, California	1,362,600	5,600	35 km (22 mi)	341	2008	15	1	n/a
Seattle Streetcar	USA	Seattle	1,326,500	4,200	6.1 km (3.8 mi)	1,105	2007	17	2	2016
RTA Rapid Transit: Blue, Green, and Waterfront Lines	USA	Cleveland	661,500	2,500	24.6 km (15.3 mi)	163	1913	34	2	1996
Tide Light Rail	USA	Norfolk, Virginia	771,500	2,500	11.9 km (7.4 mi)	338	2011	11	1	n/a
TECO Line Streetcars	USA	Tampa, Florida	1,428,700	3,489	4.3 km (2.7 mi)	1,292	2002	11	1	2010
Sun Link	USA	Tucson, Arizona	1,724,900	5,800	6.3 km (3.9 mi)	1,487	2014	22	1	n/a
The Hop	USA	Milwaukee, Wisconsin	760,321	1,426	3.4 km (2.1 mi)		2018	18	1	2018
El Paso Streetcar	USA	El Paso, Texas	130,600	600	7.7 km (4.8 mi)		2018	27	2	2018
Atlanta Streetcar	USA	Atlanta, Georgia	184,500	600	4.3 km (2.7 mi)	111	2014	12	1	n/a
MATA Trolleys	USA	Memphis, Tennessee	365,400	800	10.1 km (6.3 mi)	0 (Note: The MATA Trolley system completely suspended operations for a significant portion of 2014 (including all of Q4 2014) due to maintenance issues.)	1993	25	3	2004
Oklahoma City Streetcar	USA	Oklahoma City, Oklahoma	288,500	-			2018	22	2	-
Astoria Riverfront Trolley	USA	Astoria, Oregon	35,000	-	5 km (3 mi)		1999	10	1	1999

== Excluded systems ==
The following systems have been excluded from the ridership table above (generally because the system's ridership statistics are not tracked by APTA):

- Galveston Island Trolley (Galveston, TX)
- Kenosha Streetcars (Kenosha, WI)
- Metro Streetcar (Little Rock, AR)
- Lowell Streetcar (Lowell, MA)
- River Street Streetcar (Savannah, GA)

== See also ==
- Light rail in North America
- Light rail
- List of tram and light rail transit systems
- List of United States light rail systems by ridership
- Light rail in the United States
- Streetcars in North America
- List of Latin American rail transit systems by ridership
- List of North American rapid transit systems by ridership
- List of United States rapid transit systems by ridership
- List of rail transit systems in the United States
- Public transportation
