= List of United States light rail systems =

The following is a list of all light rail systems in the United States. Also included are some of the urban streetcar/trolley systems that provide regular public transit service (operating year-round and at least five days per week), ones with data available from the American Public Transportation Association's (APTA) Ridership Reports. This list does not include statistics for metro/rapid transit systems (see: the List of United States rapid transit systems for those). Daily and annual ridership figures are based on "average weekday unlinked passenger trips" (where transfers between lines are counted as two separate passenger "boardings" or "trips"). References with supplementary (non-APTA) ridership figures are included in the System column.

== List ==
System	City/area served	Type	Annual ridership 2025	Avg. ridership weekdays, Q2 2026	System length	Avg. boardings per mile weekdays, Q2 2026	Opened	Stations	Lines	Last expanded
Metro Rail light rail: (Note: This system also includes rapid transit lines (see List of metro systems), and connections to a commuter rail system; the ridership figures and statistics presented here represent only the light rail portion of the system.) A, C, E, & K lines	Los Angeles		47,773,700	159,400	103.3 mi (166.2 km)	1,543	1990	88	4	2025
MBTA light rail: Green Line & Mattapan Line (Note: This line or system is operated using heritage streetcars.)	Boston	Legacy	42,065,000	135,500	26 mi (42 km)	5,212	1897	74	5	2022
San Diego Trolley (Note: This system also has available connections to a commuter rail system; the ridership figures and statistics presented here represent only the light rail portion of the system.) (incl. Silver Line)	San Diego		41,069,900	130,000	65 mi (105 km)	2,000	1981	62	5	2021
Link (incl. T Line)	Seattle		37,763,800	169,300	63 mi (101 km)	3,087	2003	50	3	2026
Muni Metro (incl. E & F)	San Francisco		34,229,500	125,100	35.7 mi (57.5 km)	3,504	1912	152	9	2022
NJ Transit: HBLR, Newark Light Rail, River LINE	Jersey City, Newark, Camden-Trenton		22,789,400	62,400 (Note: This is the Average Daily Ridership figure, not an "Average Weekday Ridership" figure – it is averaged from the Total Ridership figure for this system.)	59.9 mi (96.4 km)	1,042	1935	24	3	2011
MAX Light Rail	Portland		22,061,900	66,300	59.7 mi (96.1 km)	1,111	1986	94	5	2015
DART rail	Dallas		21,611,600	65,300	119 mi (192 km)	702	1996	73	5	2025
SEPTA Metro: T, G, & D	Philadelphia	Legacy	15,626,500	55,800	68.4 mi (110.1 km)	816	1906	>100	3	2005
TRAX (UTA) and S Line	Salt Lake City		13,279,100	40,300	46.8 mi (75.3 km)	861	1999	57	4	2013
METRO Light Rail	Minneapolis-St. Paul		12,848,200	37,100	21.8 mi (35.1 km)	1,702	2004	37	2	2014
METRORail	Houston		12,651,100	37,700	23.8 mi (38.3 km)	1,584	2004	44	3	2017
Valley Metro Rail & Streetcar	Phoenix		11,100,300	33,700	41.5 mi (66.8 km)	1,131	2008	62	3	2025
Denver RTD: D, E, H, R, L, & W Lines	Denver		10,568,000	42,300	58.5 mi (94.1 km)	723	1994	62	6	2019
MetroLink	St. Louis		7,665,000	21,800	46 mi (74 km)	474	1993	37	2	2006
SacRT light rail	Sacramento		7,410,000	22,900	42.9 mi (69.0 km)	534	1987	54	3	2015
CATS: Blue and Gold lines	Charlotte		6,403,100	19,300	20.8 mi (33.5 km)	928	2007	43	2	2021
Baltimore Light RailLink	Baltimore	Modern	5,015,100	17,600	33 mi (53 km)	533	1992	33	3	1997
VTA light rail	San Jose		4,469,300	17,700	42.2 mi (67.9 km)	419	1987	62	3	2005
RTA Streetcars in New Orleans	New Orleans		3,136,500	10,400	26.9 mi (43.3 km)	387	1835	n/a (Note: Uses streetcar-like surface stops.)	5	2018
Pittsburgh Light Rail	Pittsburgh		3,104,400	8,500	26.2 mi (42.2 km)	325	1984 (Note: As current incarnation of light rail.)	53	3	2012
Portland Streetcar (Note: This system is owned by the City of Portland, which is not a member of APTA, and its ridership figures are not included in the APTA statistics for Portland.)	Portland		2,900,000	8,089	9.35 mi (15.05 km)	834	2001	76	3	2015
Buffalo Metro Rail	Buffalo	Modern	2,453,100	11,800	6.4 mi (10.3 km)	1,844	1984	14	1	2025
KC Streetcar	Kansas City		2,155,081	9,945	6.4 mi (10.3 km)	1,553	2016	19	1	2026
SPRINTER	Oceanside		1,684,400	4,900	22 mi (35 km)	223	2008	15	1	—
Sun Link	Tucson		1,535,900	3,500	3.9 mi (6.3 km)	897	2014	22	1	—
Seattle Streetcar	Seattle	Modern	1,519,100	5,300	3.8 mi (6.1 km)	1,395	2007	21	2	2016
TECO Line Streetcar	Tampa		1,330,932	3,000	2.7 mi (4.3 km)	1,173	2002	11	1	2010
Connector	Cincinnati		1,198,859	3,087	3.6 mi (5.8 km)	1,036	2016	18	1	—
Q-Line	Detroit		1,003,975	3,185	3.3 mi (5.3 km)	745	2017	20	1	—
Tide Light Rail	Norfolk		865,500	2,900	7.4 mi (11.9 km)	392	2011	11	1	—
RTA Rapid Transit: (Note: This system also has a heavy rail rapid transit/metro portion (see List of metro systems); the ridership figures and statistics presented here represent only the light rail portion of the system.) Blue, Green, and Waterfront lines	Cleveland		757,700	2,300	15.3 mi (24.6 km)	150	1913	34	2	1996
The Hop	Milwaukee		532,460	1,311	2.1 mi (3.4 km)	624	2018	21	2	2023
Dallas Streetcar	Dallas		523,046	1,923	2.45 mi (3.94 km)	784	2015	6	1	2016
El Paso Streetcar	El Paso		396,200	1,400	4.8 mi (7.7 km)	292	2018	27	2	—
Oklahoma City Streetcar	Oklahoma City		288,517	790	5.6 mi (9.0 km)	141	2018	22	2	—
Atlanta Streetcar	Atlanta	Streetcar	218,500	600	2.7 mi (4.3 km)	222	2014	12	1	—
MATA Trolley	Memphis		0	0 (Note: This system has been suspended since August 18, 2024 due to maintenance issues.)	2 mi (3.2 km)	400	1993	11	1	2004

== Gallery ==
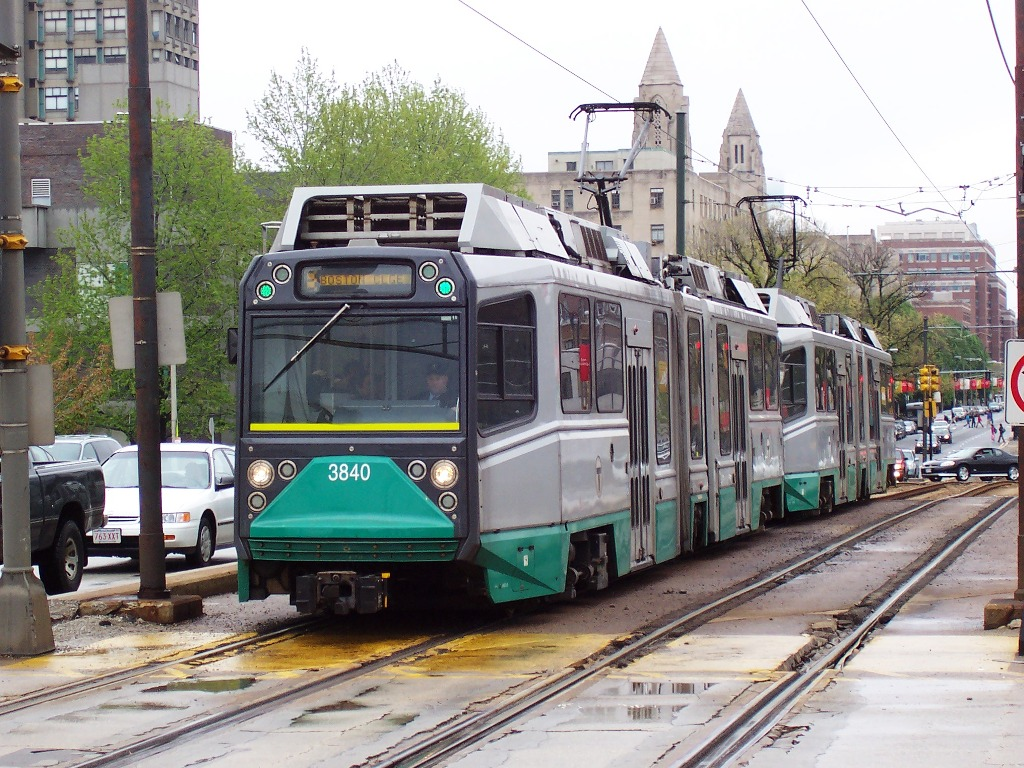
MBTA Green Line

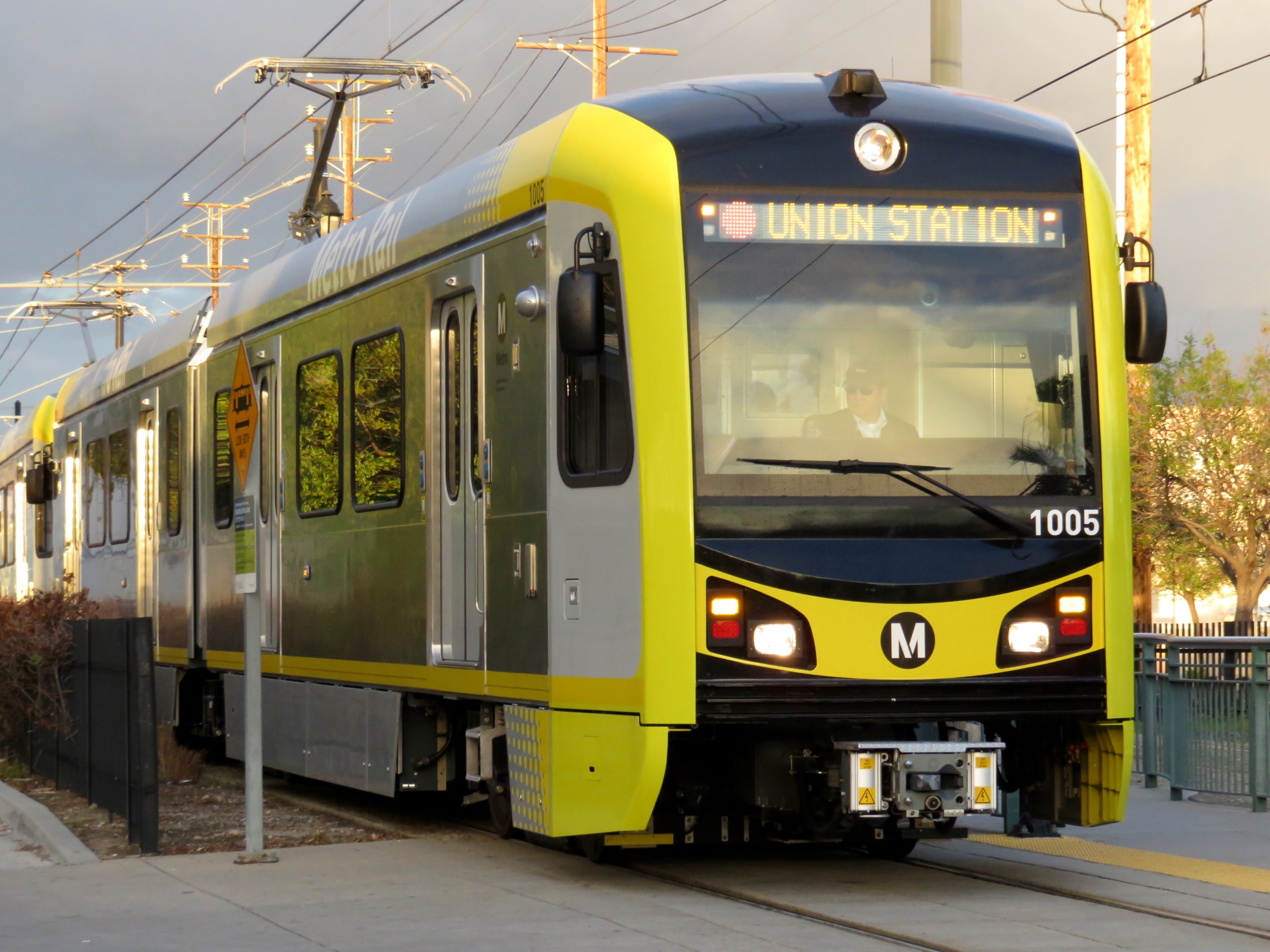
LA Metro former (L) Line

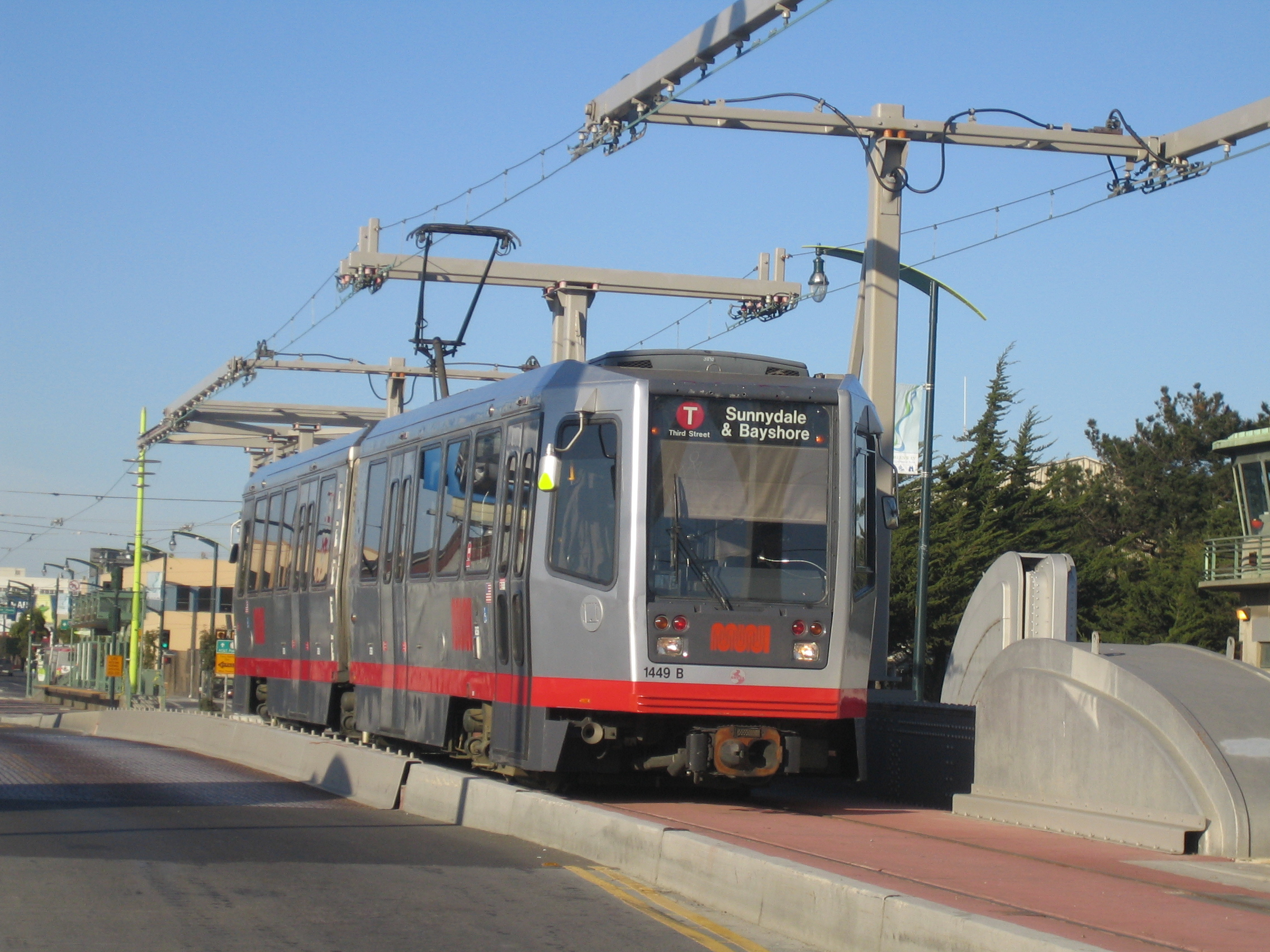
Muni Metro's T Third line

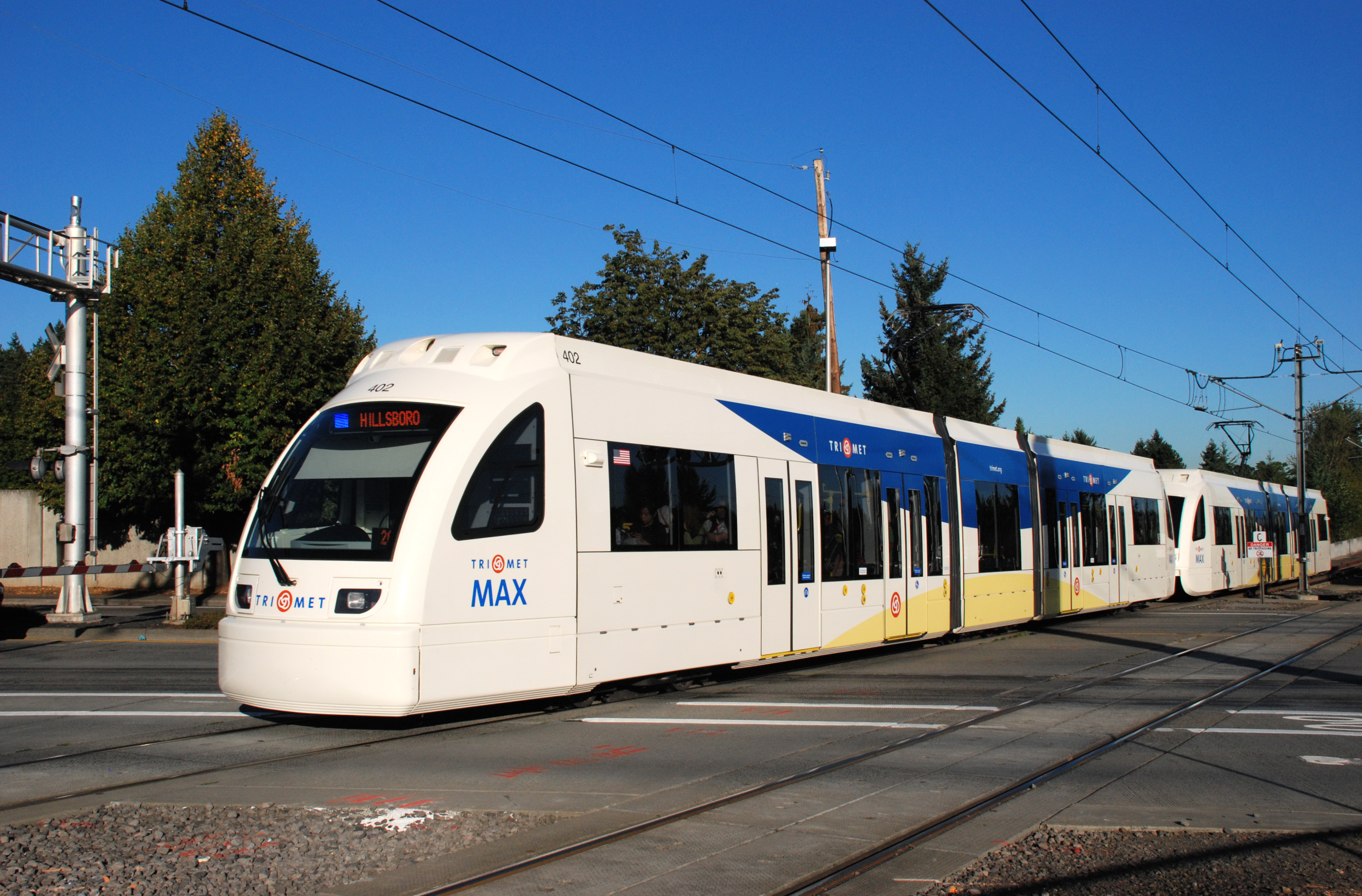
MAX Light Rail

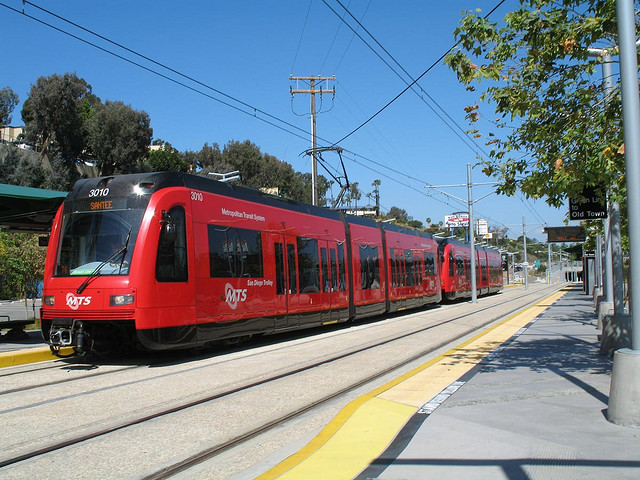
San Diego Trolley

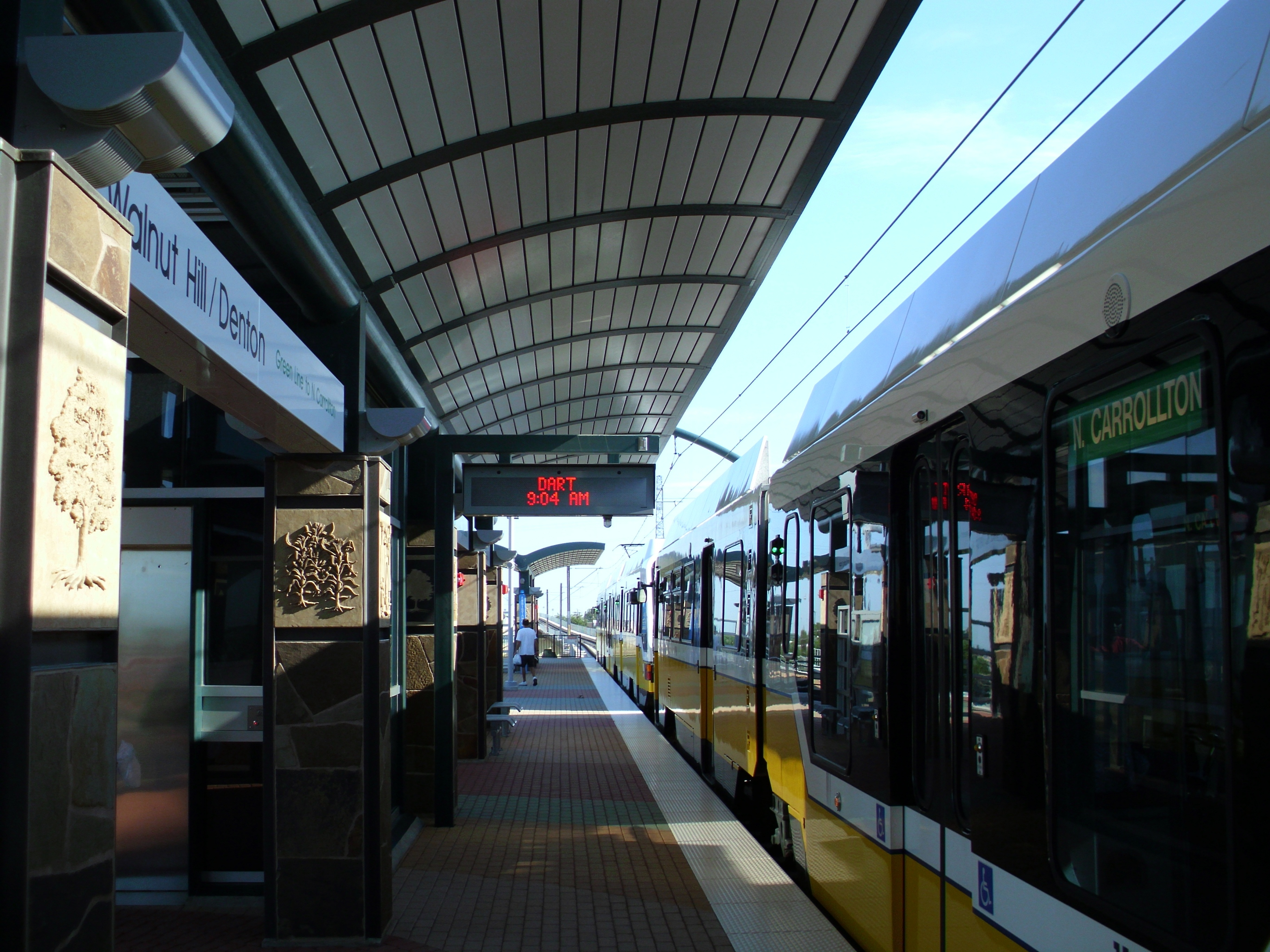
DART Green Line

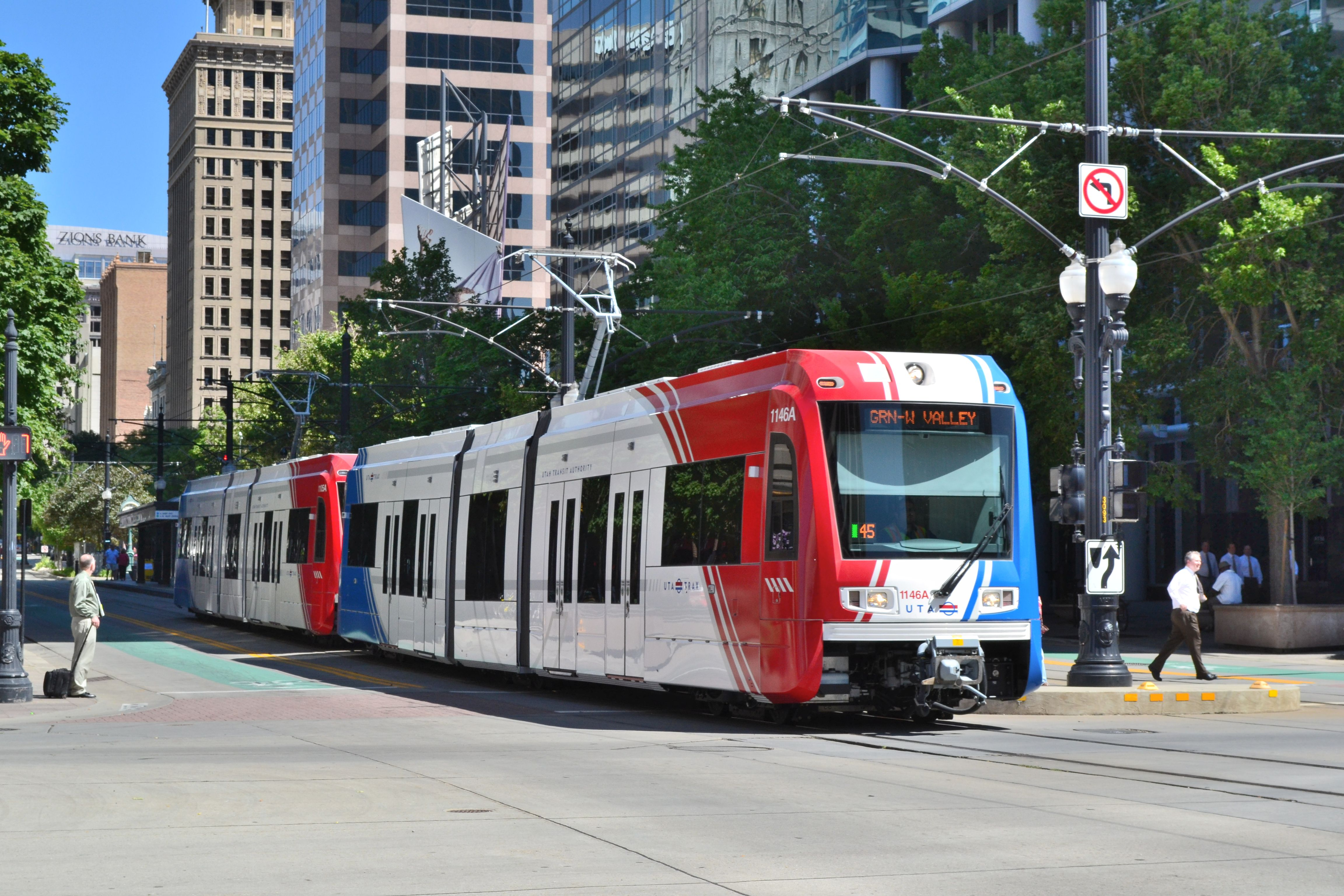
TRAX Green Line

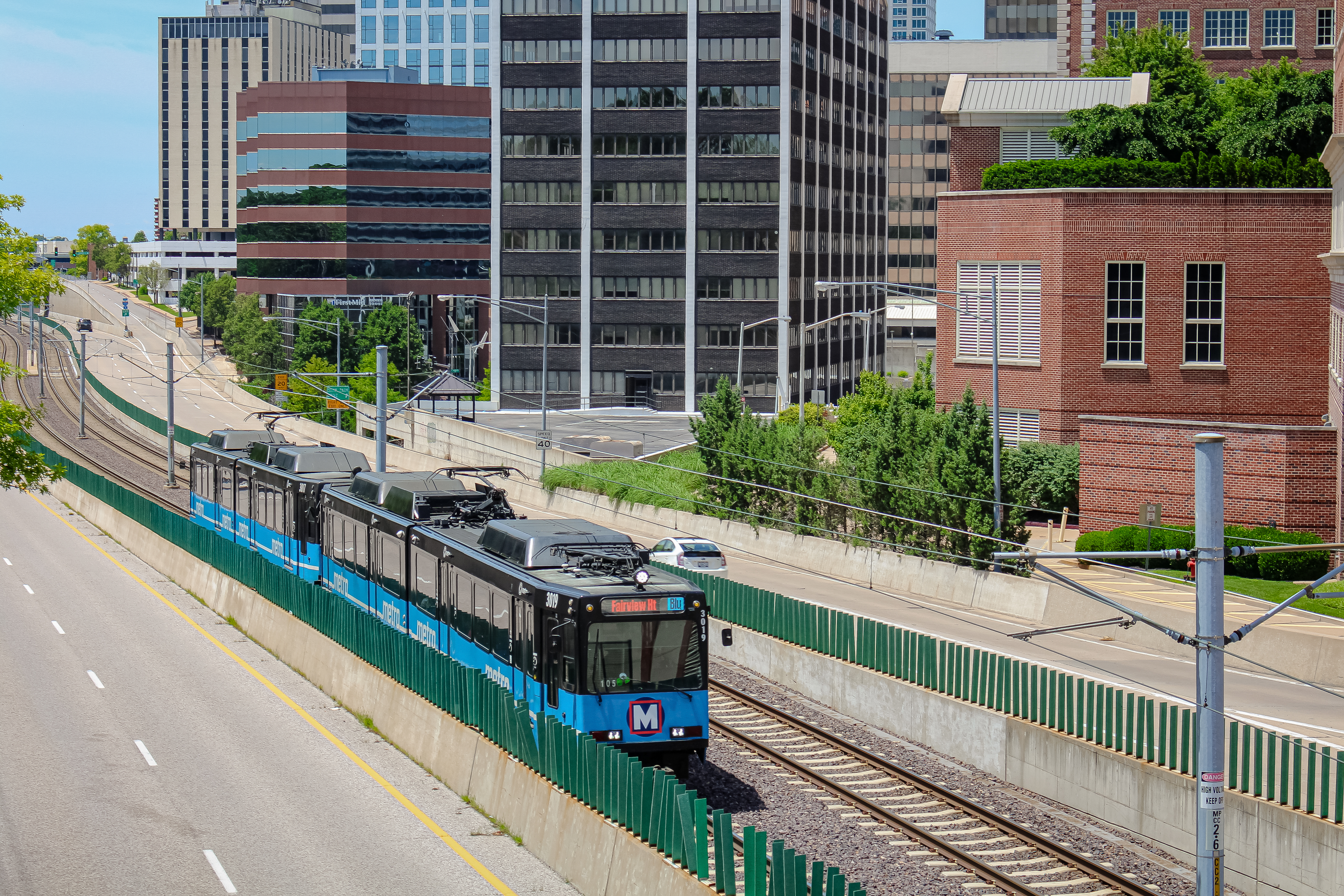
St. Louis MetroLink

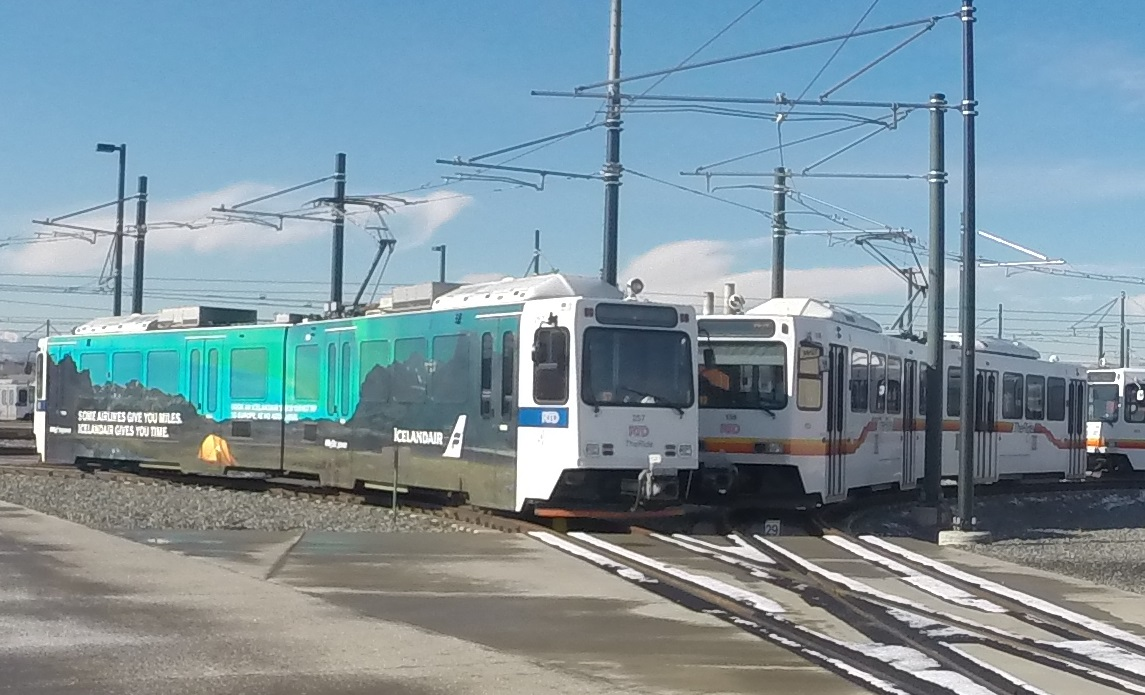
RTD Denver Light Rail

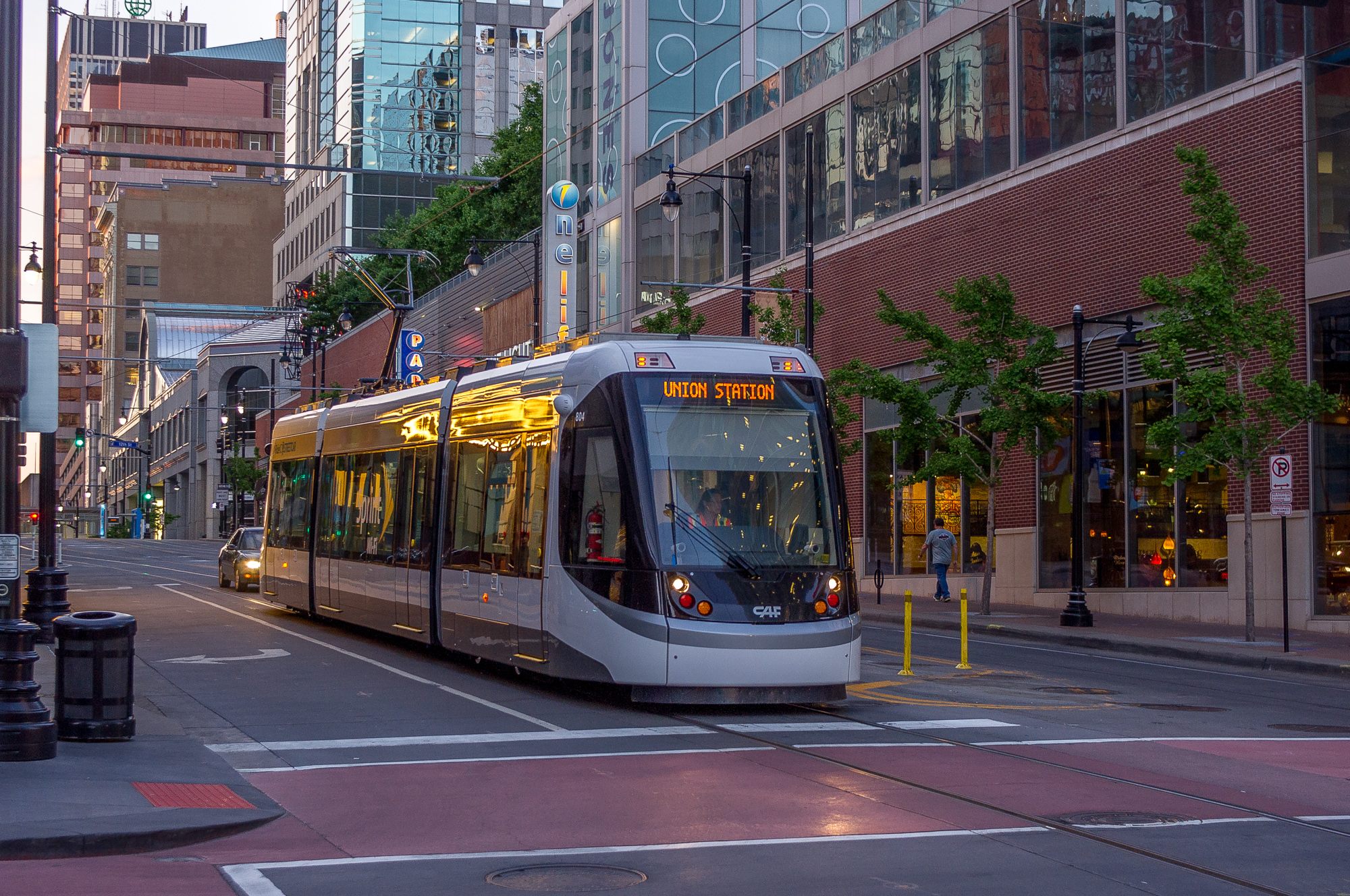
KC Streetcar in Kansas City, Missouri

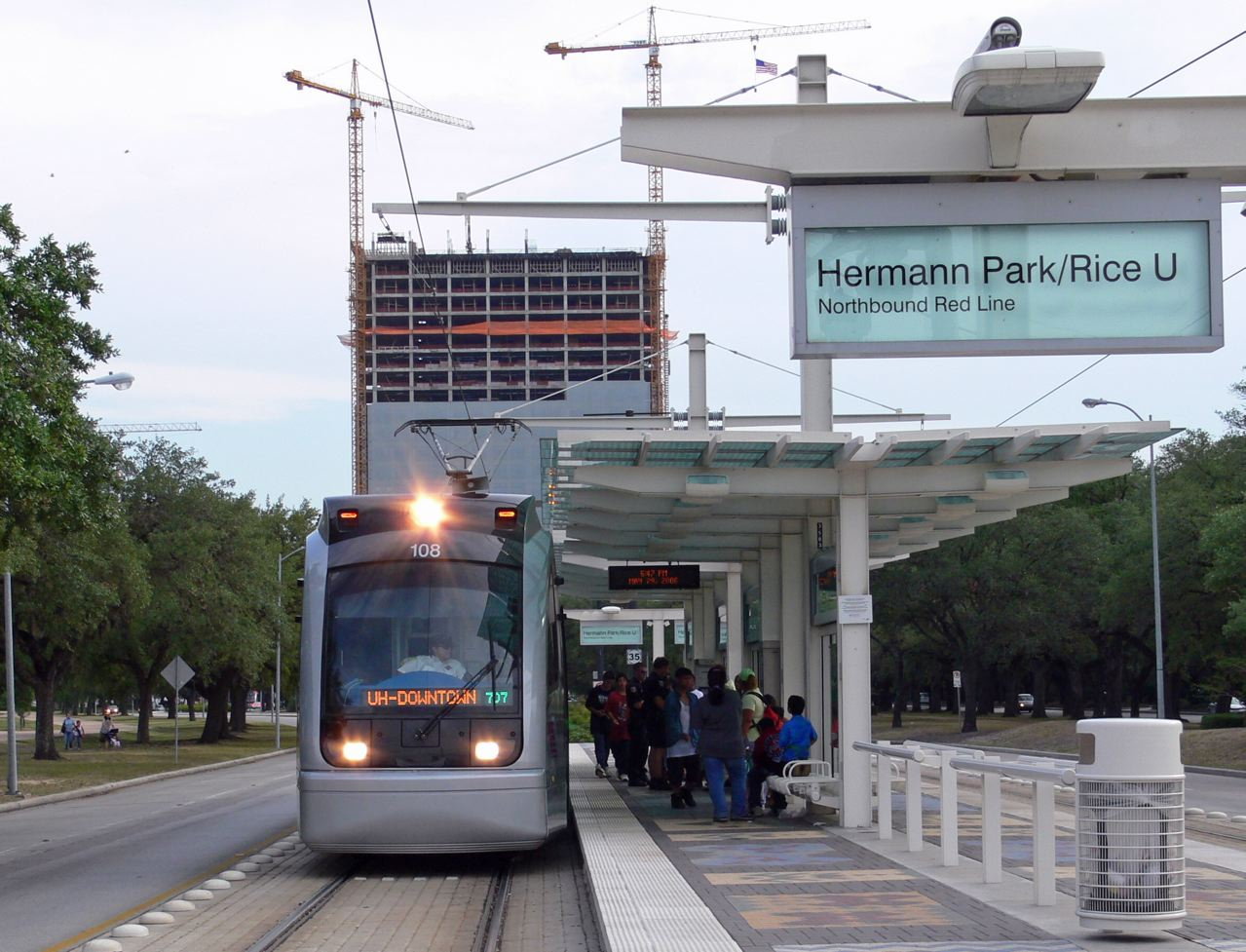
Houston METRORail Red Line

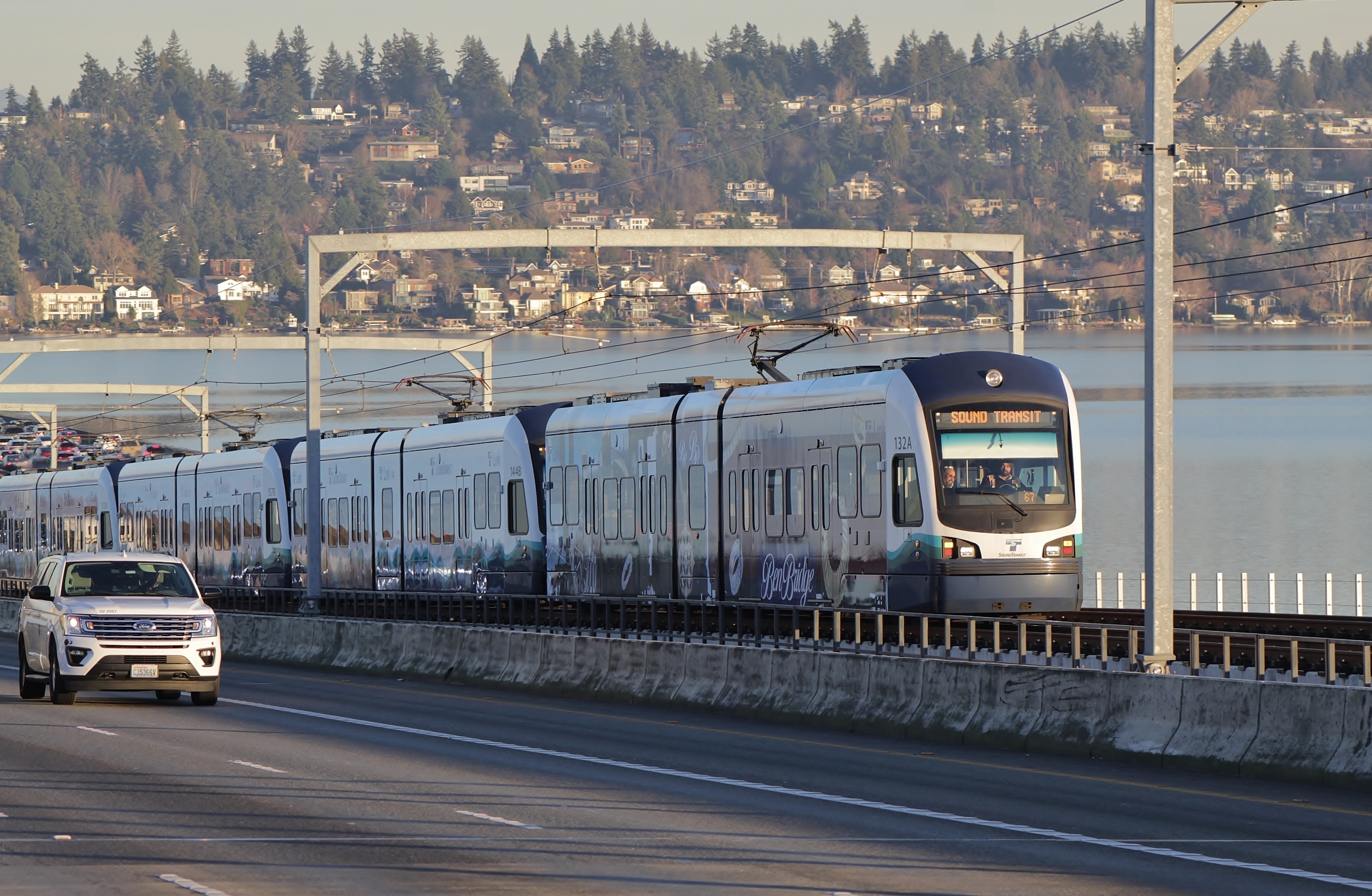
Link light rail 2 Line

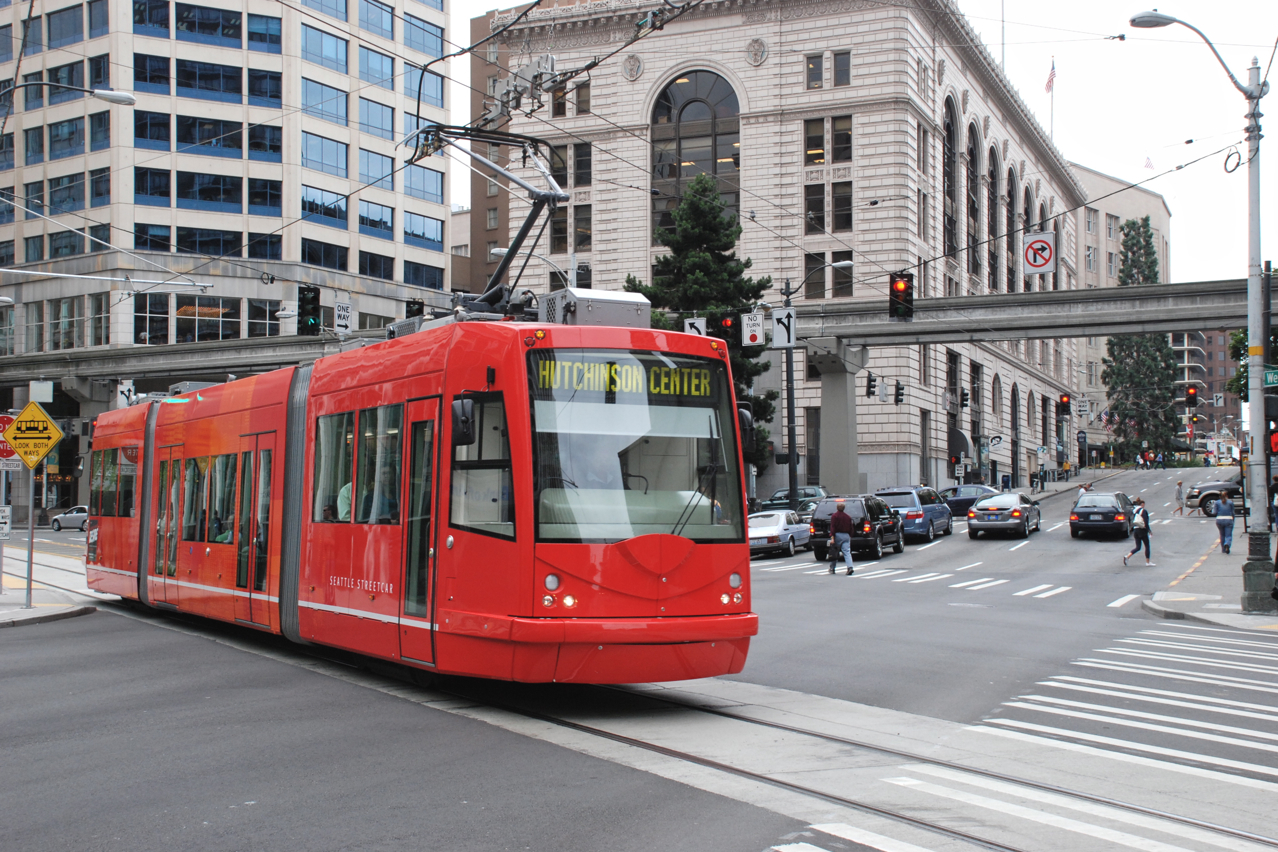
Seattle Streetcar South Lake Union Line

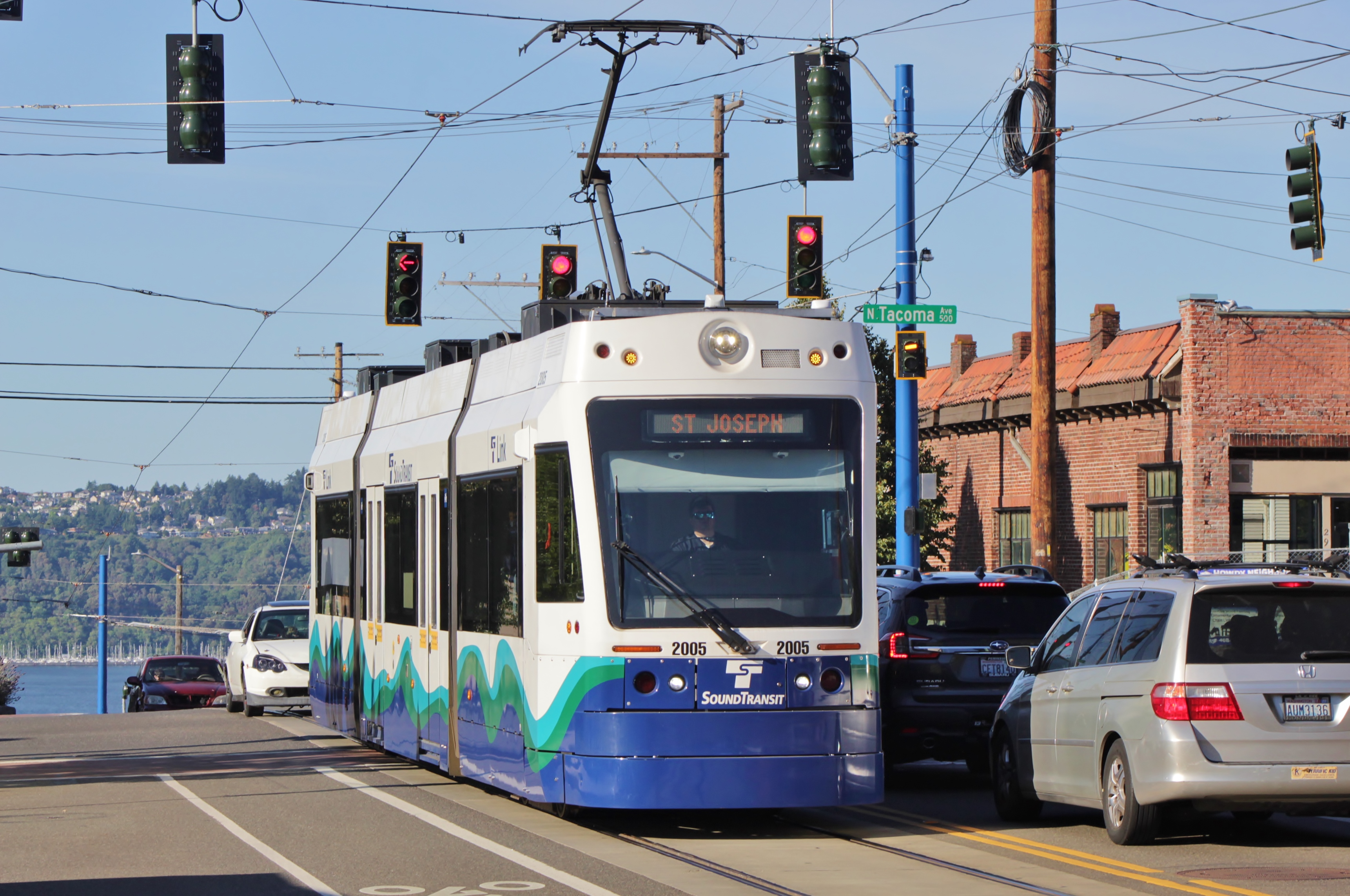
Link light rail T Line

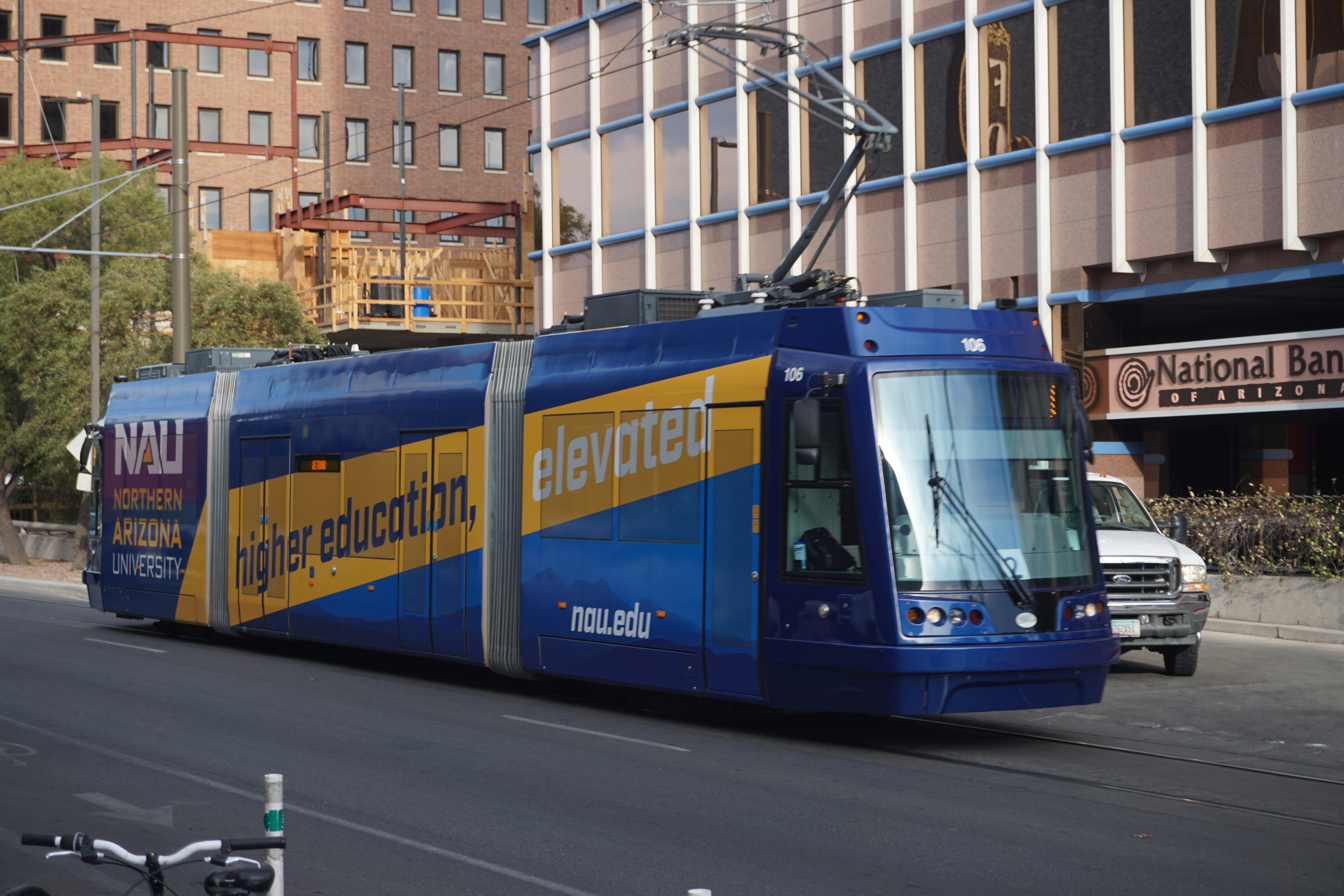
Sun Link Streetcar

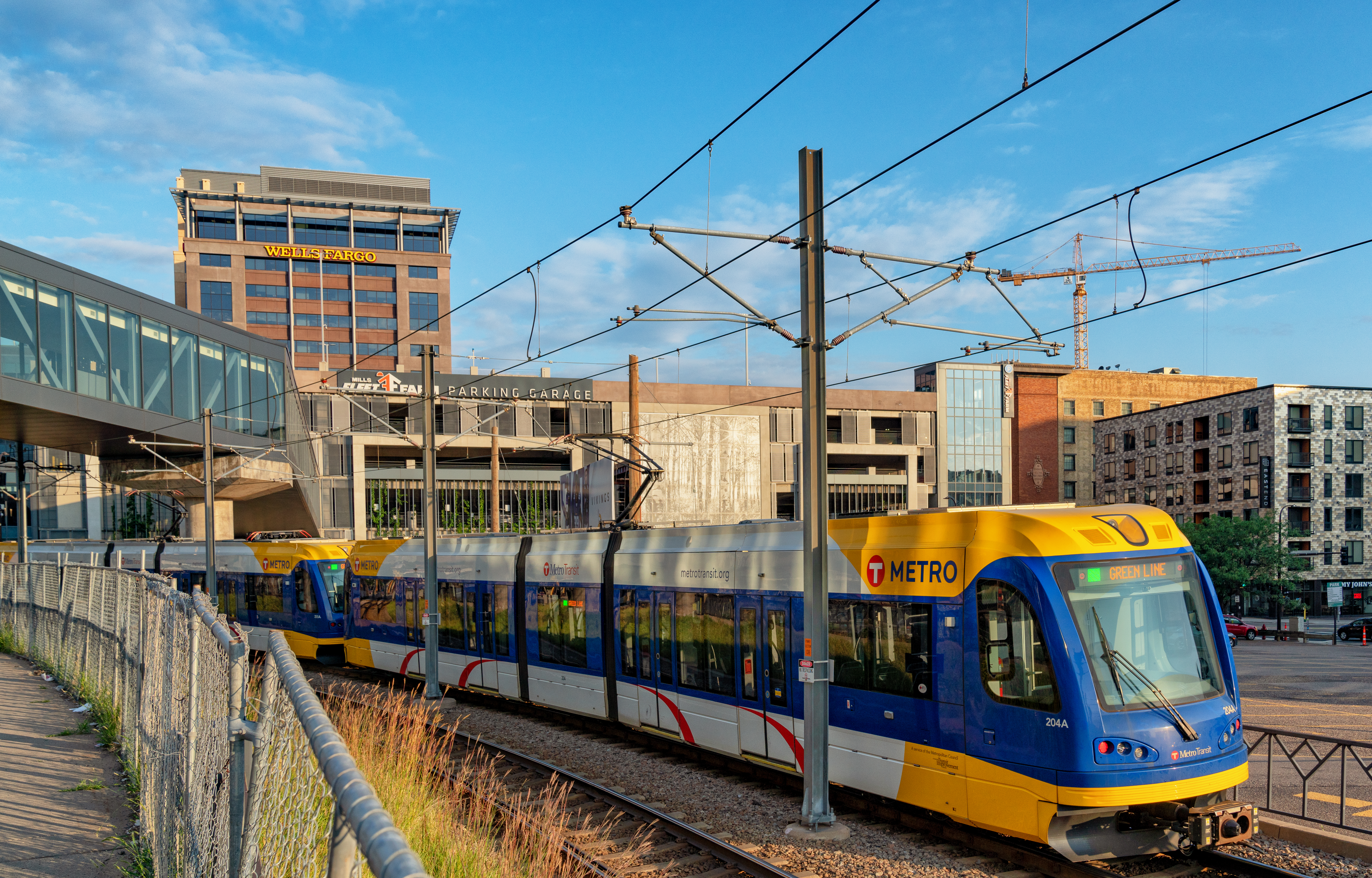
Metro Transit Green Line

== Systems excluded from ridership table ==
The following light rail systems have been excluded from the ridership table above:

System	Largest city served	Opened	Route length	Reason(s) for exclusion from Ridership table
San Francisco cable car system	San Francisco, CA	1873	5.1 mi (8.2 km)	APTA does not provide ridership figures for this system.
Lowell National Historical Park Trolley System	Lowell, MA	1984	1.2 mi (1.9 km)	Primarily a tourist system (does not operate daily, year-round). APTA does not provide ridership figures.
Galveston Island Trolley	Galveston, TX	1988	6.8 mi (10.9 km)	Primarily a tourist system. APTA does not provide ridership figures.
Kenosha Streetcars	Kenosha, WI	2000	2.0 mi (3.2 km)	Primarily a tourist system. APTA does not provide ridership figures.
Metro Streetcar	Little Rock, AR	2004	3.4 mi (5.5 km)	Primarily a tourist system. APTA does not provide ridership figures.

== See also ==
- Light rail in the United States
- Light rail
- List of North American light rail systems
- Light rail in North America
- Streetcars in North America
- List of tram and light rail transit systems
- List of rail transit systems in the United States
- List of United States rapid transit systems
- List of North American rapid transit systems
- List of Latin American rail transit systems by ridership
- List of United States commuter rail systems
- List of United States local bus agencies
- Public transport
