= List of United States local bus agencies =

The following is a list of local bus agencies in the United States, ranked by ridership. All figures are unlinked passenger trips for the stated time period and come from the Federal Transit Administration's National Transit Database (NTD).

== List ==
The NTD categorizes ridership data by type of service. The data below shows the sum of all categories with a mode of "bus" for each transit agency. Only the top 100 agencies with the most ridership in 2025 are shown.

Rank	Transit Agency	Urban Area	2023 Annual Ridership	2024 Annual Ridership	2025 Annual Ridership
1	MTA New York City Bus	New York--Jersey City--Newark, NY--NJ	614,121,341	694,749,060	699,564,006
2	LACMTA	Los Angeles--Long Beach--Anaheim, CA	225,409,039	245,205,837	239,981,625
3	CTA	Chicago, IL--IN	161,699,361	181,733,617	199,648,790
4	New Jersey Transit	New York--Jersey City--Newark, NY--NJ	132,991,171	145,754,417	138,153,987
5	MTA Bus	New York--Jersey City--Newark, NY--NJ	119,571,794	126,616,665	134,291,965
6	SFMTA	San Francisco--Oakland, CA	118,248,008	128,699,730	129,946,219
7	WMATA	Washington--Arlington, DC--VA--MD	111,663,898	124,834,799	119,892,668
8	SEPTA	Philadelphia, PA--NJ--DE--MD	107,189,009	114,723,257	117,851,180
9	MBTA	Boston, MA--NH	91,644,053	102,384,017	96,466,634
10	King County Metro	Seattle--Tacoma, WA	77,075,344	86,699,513	92,260,074
11	METRO	Houston, TX	57,224,547	63,719,167	65,681,374
12	Miami-Dade Transit	Miami--Fort Lauderdale, FL	60,116,701	63,003,564	58,685,881
13	RTC Transit	Las Vegas--Henderson--Paradise, NV	52,741,961	55,693,032	57,931,063
14	MTA Maryland	Baltimore, MD	51,328,836	53,667,532	55,259,945
15	Denver RTD	Denver--Aurora, CO	43,214,192	44,798,864	44,734,243
16	TriMet	Portland, OR--WA	38,683,561	42,379,837	43,941,608
17	TheBus	Honolulu, HI	41,235,504	42,251,674	42,668,084
18	AC Transit	San Francisco--Oakland, CA	37,900,247	40,623,207	40,592,564
19	MTS	San Diego, CA	33,346,926	37,896,753	38,582,338
20	Metro Transit	Minneapolis--St. Paul, MN	30,123,953	31,941,893	37,640,785
21	OCTA	Los Angeles--Long Beach--Anaheim, CA	34,535,089	38,040,396	36,612,730
22	MARTA	Atlanta, GA	32,848,939	36,068,007	35,097,068
23	PRT	Pittsburgh, PA	35,436,623	33,447,893	34,492,340
24	VIA	San Antonio, TX	28,844,499	31,132,211	31,506,408
25	DART	Dallas--Fort Worth--Arlington, TX	28,215,598	31,384,921	30,370,011
26	Bee-Line Bus System	New York--Jersey City--Newark, NY--NJ	21,997,971	24,845,995	25,518,185
27	MCTS	Milwaukee, WI	22,735,042	25,665,100	25,415,403
28	CapMetro	Austin, TX	24,641,220	26,348,440	25,362,703
29	City of Phoenix (Note: Valley Metro is operated by both the City of Phoenix and the Regional Public Transportation Authority. This row is for the City of Phoenix.)	Phoenix--Mesa--Scottsdale, AZ	21,083,391	25,350,864	24,563,226
30	BCT	Miami--Fort Lauderdale, FL	23,694,258	25,476,701	24,457,323
31	VTA	San Jose, CA	21,411,361	24,259,877	23,107,235
32	UTA	Salt Lake City, UT	20,279,580	22,409,691	22,994,004
33	LYNX	Orlando, FL	18,724,762	19,733,778	22,126,709
34	RTA	Cleveland, OH	18,280,915	20,929,133	20,897,321
35	NICE	New York--Jersey City--Newark, NY--NJ	20,293,586	22,131,986	20,651,659
36	PACE	Chicago, IL--IN	19,063,501	21,121,330	20,540,499
37	LBT	Los Angeles--Long Beach--Anaheim, CA	17,752,052	19,148,453	19,671,730
38	Ride On	Washington--Arlington, DC--VA--MD	16,636,245	19,234,872	19,421,855
39	CDTA	Albany--Schenectady, NY	15,824,491	18,491,586	18,241,392
40	Sun Tran	Tucson, AZ	15,643,906	16,924,090	16,779,486
41	Metro Transit	St. Louis, MO--IL	12,954,626	13,708,162	14,240,080
42	DDOT	Detroit, MI	12,093,925	13,477,495	14,028,916
43	NFTA	Buffalo, NY	12,996,524	13,676,221	13,902,315
44	LADOT	Los Angeles--Long Beach--Anaheim, CA	15,634,186	16,192,289	13,725,714
45	SORTA	Cincinnati, OH--KY	13,083,835	13,578,716	13,496,067
46	COTA	Columbus, OH	11,526,490	12,349,881	12,930,462
47	RIPTA	Providence, RI--MA	12,584,838	13,048,623	12,530,882
48	Metro Transit	Madison, WI	9,514,620	9,297,857	12,524,577
49	GRTC	Richmond, VA	10,176,770	12,059,643	12,319,317
50	CT Transit - Hartford (Note: CT Transit operates under five divisions. This row is just for the Hartford division.)	Hartford, CT	13,943,791	12,313,202	11,906,509
51	KCATA	Kansas City, MO--KS	12,275,924	12,586,497	11,868,208
52	MTD	Champaign, IL	9,038,382	10,568,157	11,685,711
53	RGRTA	Rochester, NY	9,893,223	11,239,742	11,321,660
54	NORTA	New Orleans, LA	8,955,727	9,750,580	11,246,392
55	SamTrans	San Francisco--Oakland, CA	9,544,034	10,719,864	11,156,186
56	Spokane Transit Authority	Spokane, WA	9,403,739	10,661,102	10,941,746
57	HART	Tampa, FL	11,548,329	11,381,269	10,635,502
58	RPTA (Note: Valley Metro is operated by both the City of Phoenix and the Regional Public Transportation Authority. This row is just for the Regional Public Transportation Authority.)	Phoenix--Mesa--Scottsdale, AZ	8,997,777	9,859,281	10,610,275
59	FAX	Fresno, CA	8,973,221	10,285,617	10,476,344
60	PSTA	Tampa--St. Petersburg, FL	10,179,682	10,500,232	10,418,388
61	SacRT	Sacramento, CA	8,948,177	9,939,974	10,319,635
62	PVTA	Springfield, MA--CT	7,489,166	8,911,654	10,128,097
63	Foothill Transit	Los Angeles--Long Beach--Anaheim, CA	8,452,534	9,743,746	10,113,676
64	Big Blue Bus	Los Angeles--Long Beach--Anaheim, CA	8,264,469	9,408,137	9,940,633
65	Sound Transit	Seattle--Tacoma, WA	8,568,134	9,197,467	9,809,654
66	Fairfax Connector	Washington--Arlington, DC--VA--MD	8,991,595	8,842,512	9,771,748
67	CATA	Lansing, MI	8,079,226	8,962,376	9,644,420
68	Palm Tran	Miami--Fort Lauderdale, FL	8,810,968	9,739,425	9,540,331
69	Community Transit	Seattle--Tacoma, WA	7,146,008	8,426,406	9,522,754
70	CATS	Charlotte, NC--SC	8,151,810	9,327,617	9,431,291
71	WeGo Public Transit	Nashville metropolitan area	8,556,148	9,132,287	9,327,356
72	HRT	Virginia Beach--Norfolk, VA	6,469,191	8,493,456	8,618,117
73	ART	Los Angeles--Long Beach--Anaheim, CA	8,611,455	8,277,649	8,506,349
74	Delaware Transit Corporation	Philadelphia, PA--NJ--DE--MD	8,046,829	8,380,928	8,066,937
75	GoRaleigh	Raleigh, NC	5,058,937	6,389,427	7,987,727
76	Pierce Transit	Seattle--Tacoma, WA	6,792,245	7,497,585	7,836,318
77	Centro	Syracuse, NY	7,144,393	7,539,167	7,790,688
78	ABQ RIDE	Albuquerque, NM	6,970,634	7,372,223	7,751,369
79	Omnitrans	Riverside--San Bernardino, CA	6,502,732	7,258,557	7,686,773
80	SMART	Detroit, MI	4,946,593	7,342,408	7,475,104
81	Texas A&M Transportation Services	College Station, TX	0	2,887,193	6,884,971
82	GoDurham	Durham, NC	6,133,140	6,893,946	6,838,342
83	RTC	Reno, NV--CA	5,919,694	6,480,122	6,836,669
84	IndyGo	Indianapolis, IN	6,888,880	7,133,338	6,822,199
85	JTA	Jacksonville, FL	6,105,618	6,831,781	6,678,747
86	LTD	Eugene, OR	6,551,411	6,681,242	6,565,188
87	TARC	Louisville/Jefferson County, KY--IN	6,652,672	7,053,211	6,544,728
88	The Rapid	Grand Rapids, MI	6,171,127	6,537,679	6,539,009
89	DASH (bus)	Washington--Arlington, DC--VA--MD	5,021,564	5,662,883	6,357,320
90	RTA	Riverside--San Bernardino, CA	5,583,921	5,995,552	6,250,315
91	CT Transit - New Haven (Note: CT Transit operates under five divisions. This row is just for the New Haven division.)	New Haven, CT	6,465,559	5,976,094	6,056,440
92	RTA	Dayton, OH	6,578,178	6,240,533	5,777,284
93	NCTD	San Diego, CA	4,802,515	5,365,058	5,745,666
94	Sun Metro	El Paso, TX--NM	6,297,801	6,394,600	5,717,514
95	Trinity Metro	Dallas--Fort Worth--Arlington, TX	5,003,070	5,373,921	5,694,295
96	METRO RTA	Akron, OH	4,324,674	5,341,634	5,604,238
97	AAATA	Ann Arbor, MI	4,786,050	5,348,186	5,588,154
98	GBT	Bridgeport--Stamford, CT--NY	4,492,306	4,965,694	5,281,681
99	Santa Cruz Metropolitan Transit District	Santa Cruz, California	3,650,051	4,129,227	5,279,836
100	Intercity Transit	Olympia--Lacey, WA	3,898,995	4,589,073	5,161,808

== See also ==
- List of bus transit systems in the United States
- List of rapid transit systems
- List of light-rail transit systems
- List of United States light rail systems by ridership
- List of United States rapid transit systems by ridership
- List of suburban and commuter rail systems
- List of United States commuter rail systems by ridership
