= List of United States rapid transit systems =

The following is a list of all heavy rail rapid transit systems in the United States. It does not include statistics for bus or light rail systems; see: List of United States light rail systems by ridership for light rail systems. All ridership figures represent unlinked passenger trips, so line transfers on multi-line systems register as separate trips. The data is provided by the American Public Transportation Association's Ridership Reports.

Note: ridership does not mean unique passengers, it means total number of trips.

	System	Transit agency	City/area served	Annual ridership 2025	Avg. ridership weekdays, Q1 2026	System length	Avg. boardings per mile weekdays, Q1 2026	Opened	Stations	Lines
1	New York City Subway	NYCTA (Note: Agency is a subsidiary of the Metropolitan Transportation Authority.)	New York City	2,314,388,000	7,245,000	248 mi (399 km)	29,214	1904	472	36
2	Washington Metro	WMATA	Washington, DC metropolitan area	188,549,700	545,900	129 mi (208 km)	4,232	1976	98	6
3	Chicago "L"	CTA	Chicago	135,202,800	385,500	102.8 mi (165.4 km)	3,750	1892	146	8
4	MBTA subway ("the T") (Note: System also includes the Green Line and Mattapan Line light rail lines; ridership data for these light rail lines is not included in statistics shown here.) (Blue, Orange, and Red lines)	MBTA	Boston	101,054,600	326,500	38 mi (61 km)	8,592	1901	53	3
5	SEPTA Metro (Note: System also includes light rail lines. Ridership data for such lines is not included in statistics given.) (L, B, and M)	SEPTA	Philadelphia	65,471,700	219,000	36.7 mi (59.1 km)	5,967	1907	75	3
6	PATH	PANYNJ	Manhattan, Hudson County, Newark	64,318,300	210,000	13.8 mi (22.2 km)	15,217	1908	13	4
7	Bay Area Rapid Transit (BART) (Note: Figures only include BART's five rapid transit lines, and not the system's AGT line to Oakland Airport nor the eBART line.)	BART	San Francisco Bay Area	53,678,000	180,000	131.4 mi (211.5 km)	1,511	1972	50	7
8	MARTA rail	MARTA	Atlanta	30,373,600	136,900	47.6 mi (76.6 km)	2,876	1979	38	4
9	Metro Rail (B and D lines)	LACMTA	Los Angeles	20,990,600	61,000	21.3 mi (34.3 km)	3,506	1993	19	2
10	Metrorail	Miami-Dade Transit	Miami	14,971,300	51,600	24.4 mi (39.3 km)	2,115	1984	23	2
11	PATCO Speedline	PATCO	Philadelphia, Camden County	5,865,800	18,500	14.2 mi (22.9 km)	1,303	1936	14	1
12	Staten Island Railway	SIRTOA	Staten Island	5,437,400	19,000	14 mi (23 km)	1,357	1860	21	1
13	Baltimore Metro SubwayLink	MTA	Baltimore	4,610,400	12,600 (Note: This is the Average Daily Ridership not Average Weekday Ridership.)	15.5 mi (24.9 km)	815	1983	14	1
14	Tren Urbano	ATI	San Juan	4,438,400	22,600	10.7 mi (17.2 km)	2,112	2004	16	1
15	RTA Rapid Transit (Red Line)	GCRTA	Cleveland	2,860,500	7,600	19 mi (31 km)	400	1955	18	1
16	Skyline	Honolulu DTS	Honolulu	1,696,800	9,200	16.1 mi (25.9 km)	571	2023	13	1

Rapid transit systems in the United States

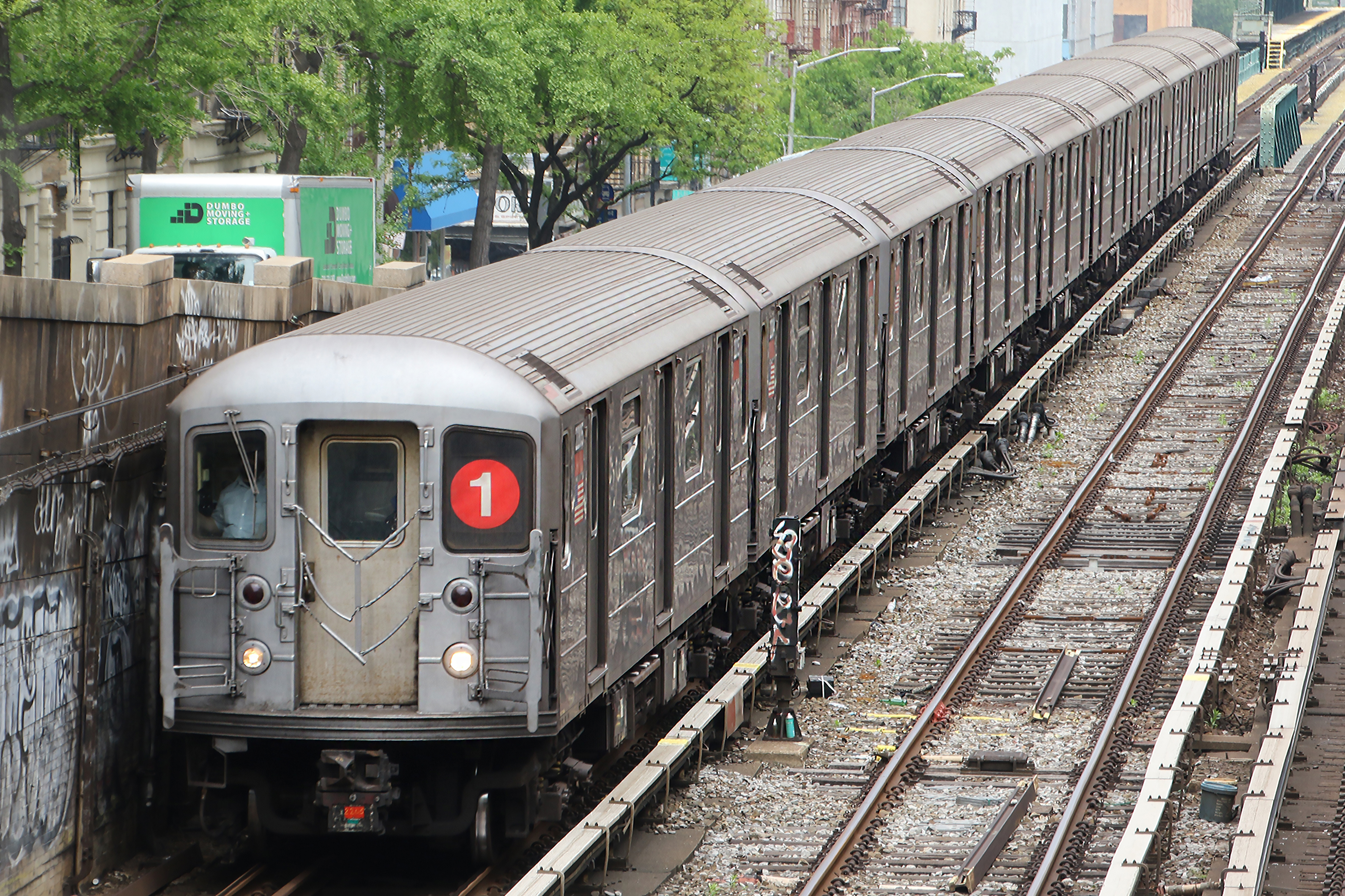
A 1 train on the New York City Subway system

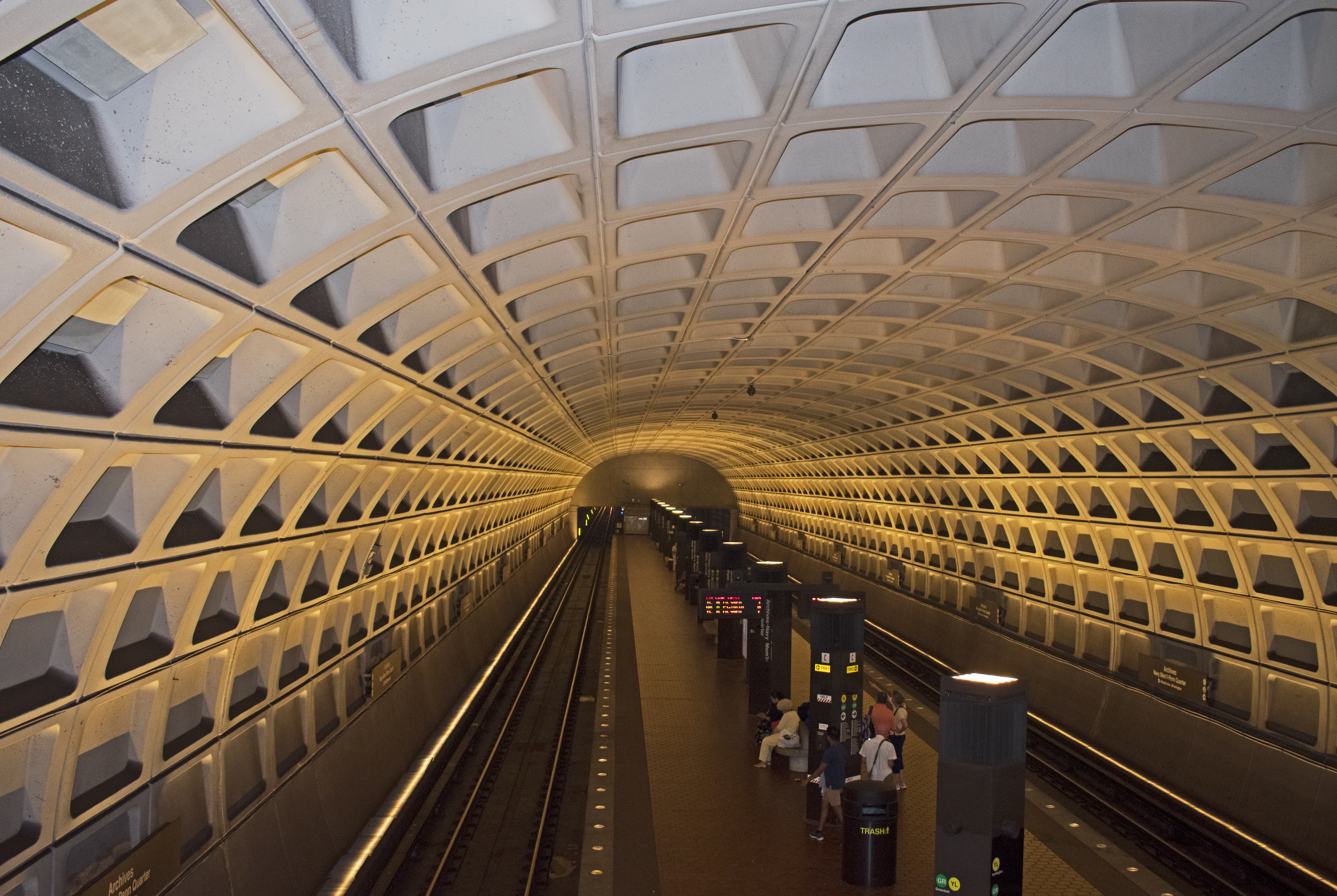
Archives station on the Washington Metro

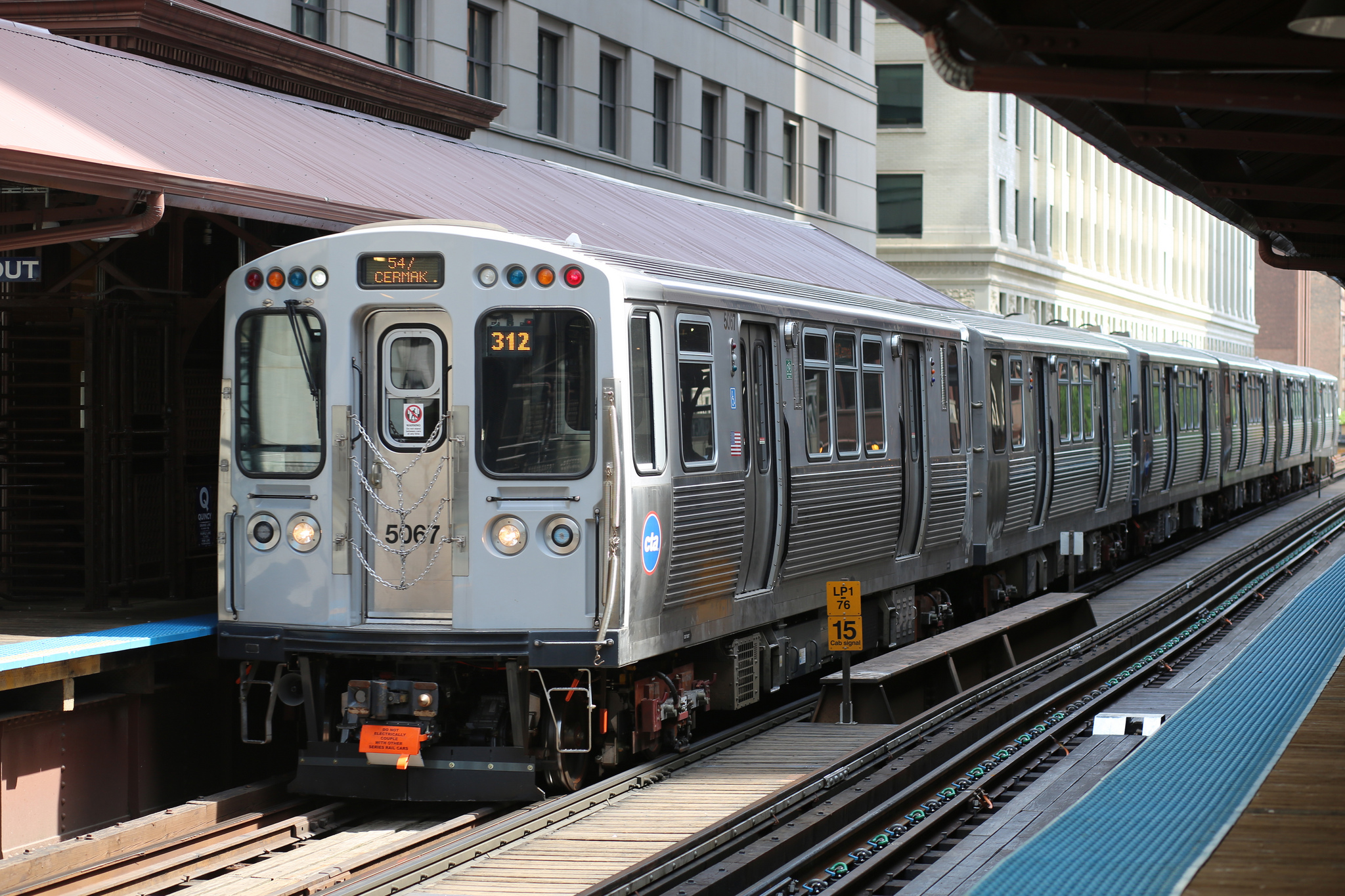
Quincy station on the Chicago 'L'

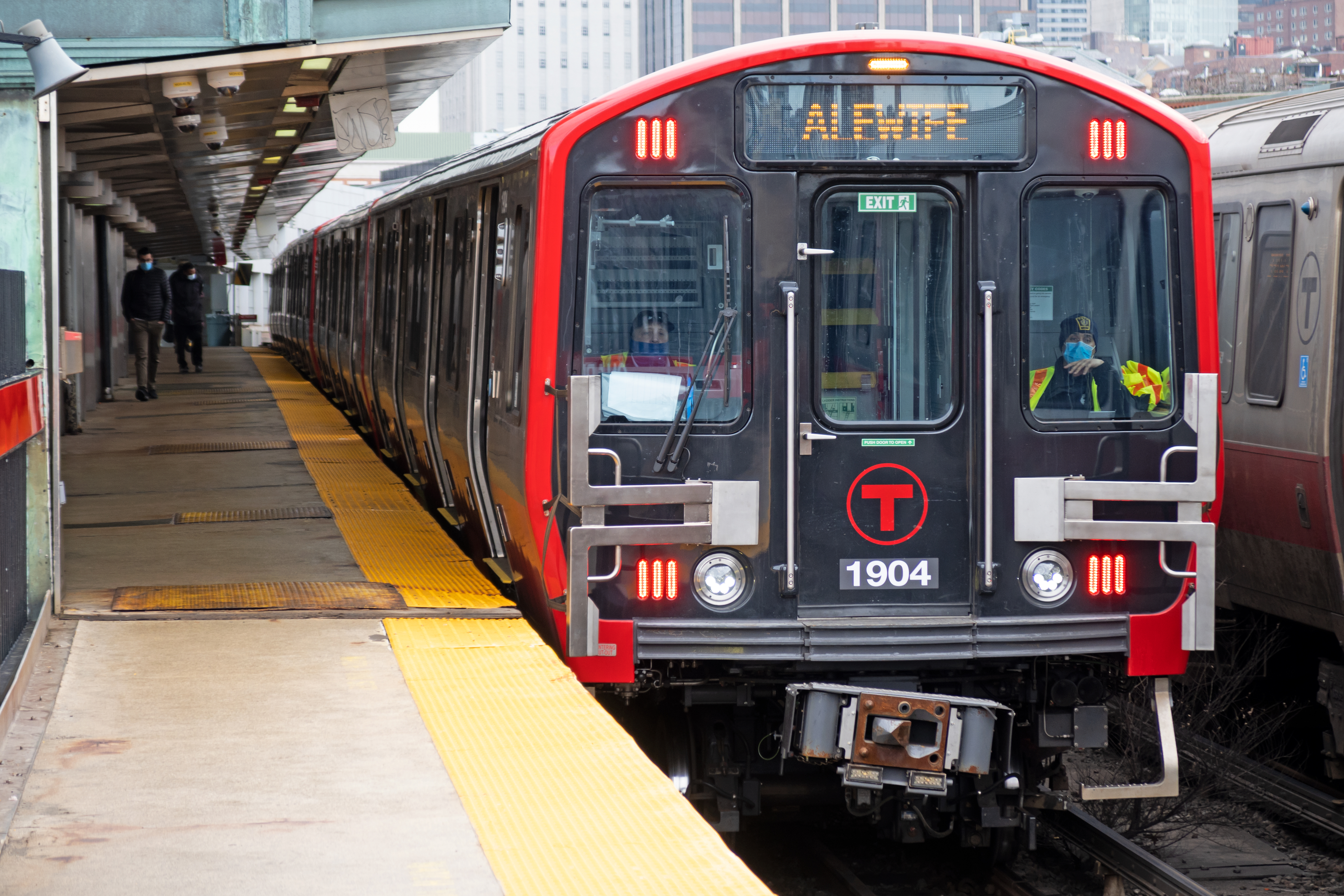
An MBTA subway train at Charles/MGH station

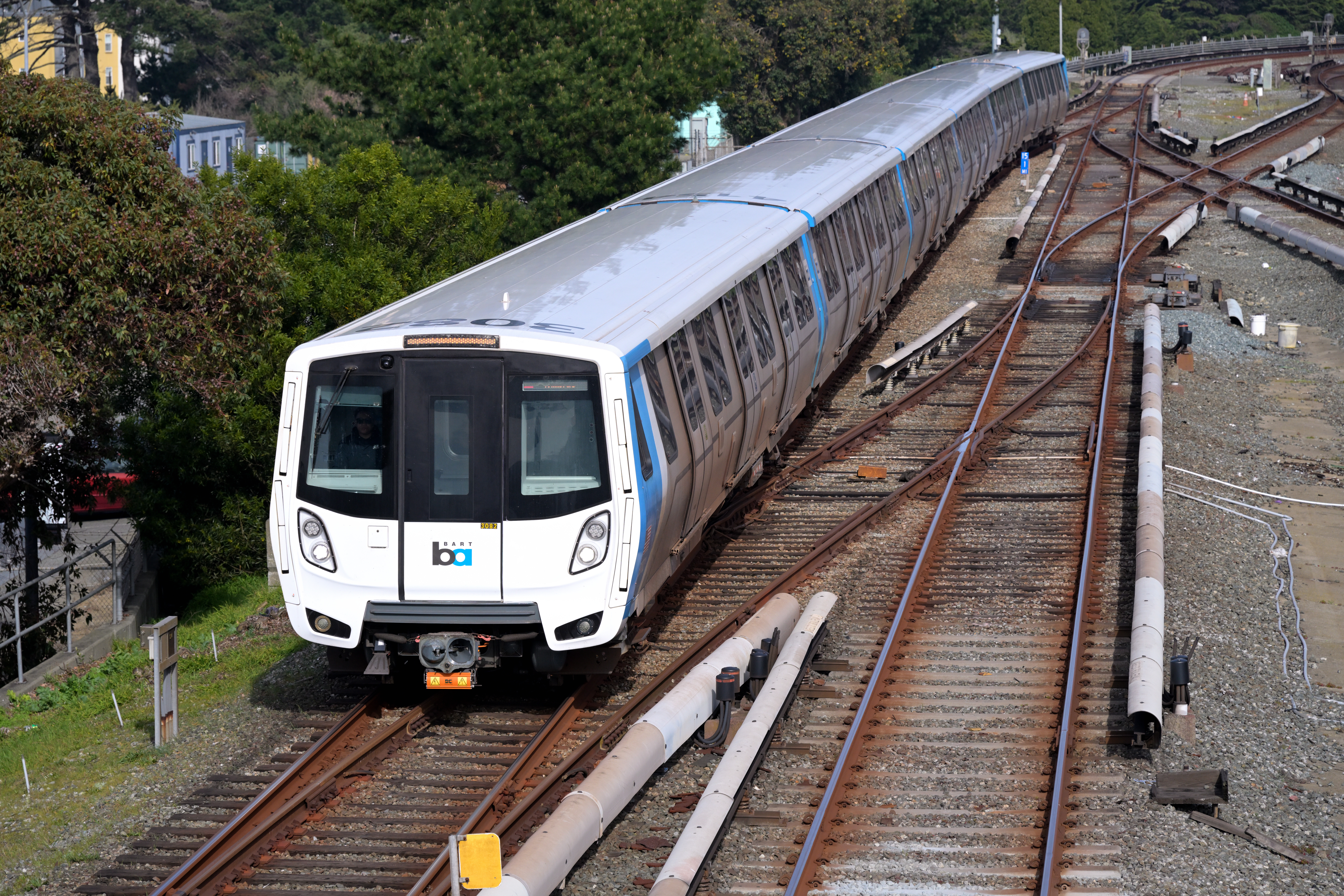
A Bay Area Rapid Transit train near Daly City station

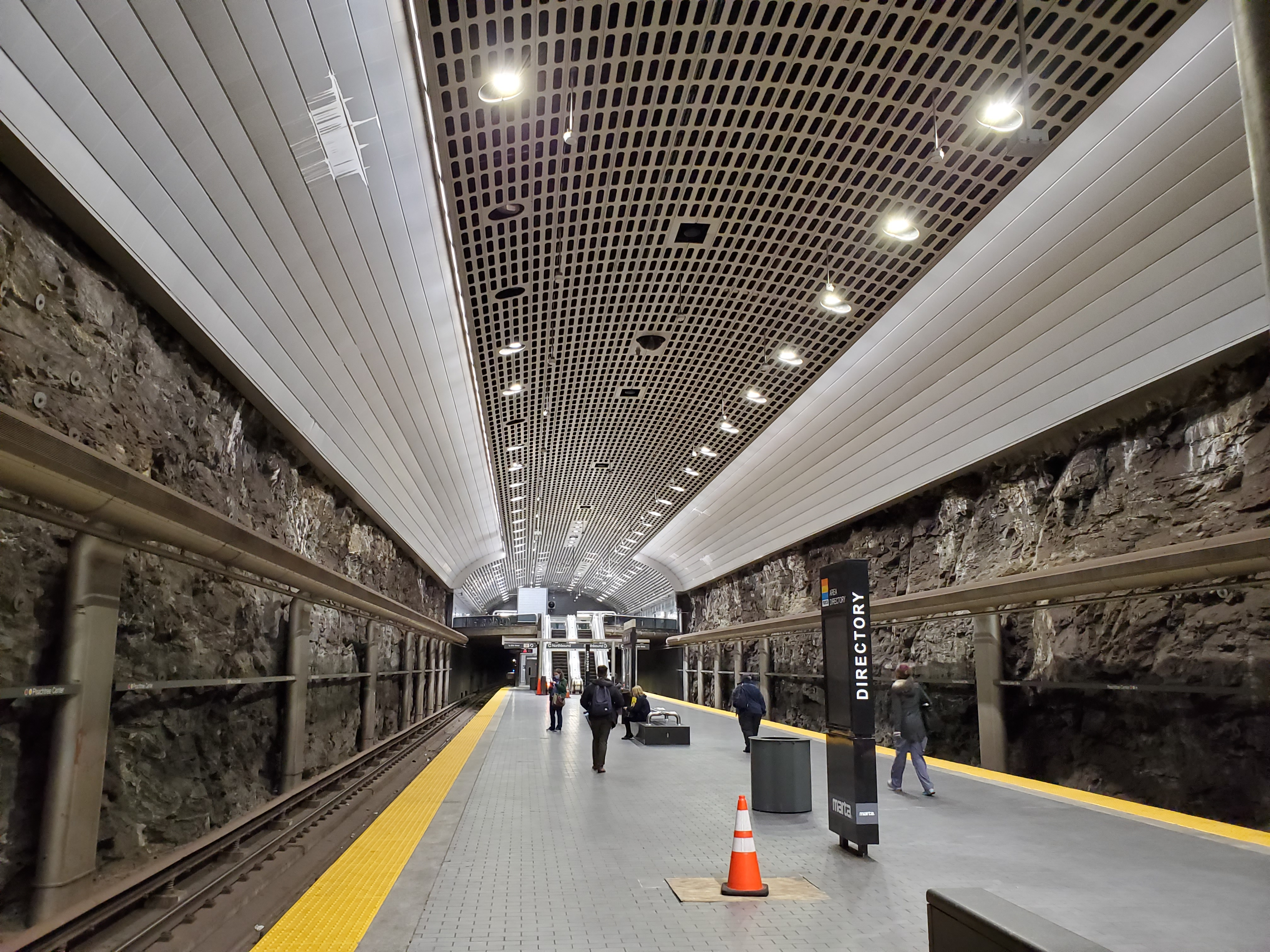
Peachtree Center station in Atlanta, served by MARTA rail

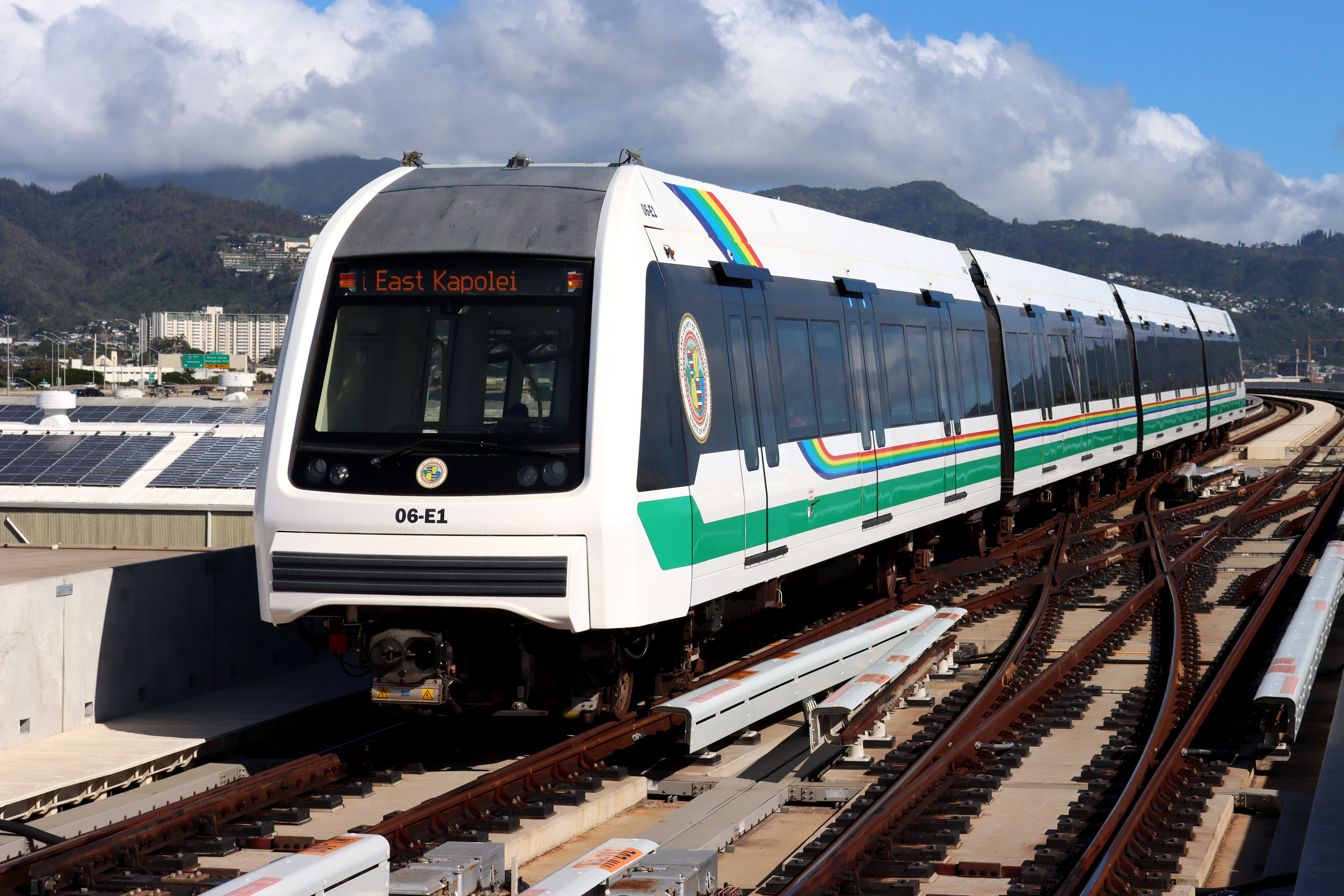
A driverless Skyline train at Āhua station in Honolulu

== Locations map ==
Rapid transit systems in the United States
Contiguous United States
Hawaii
Insular United States
Puerto Rico

== See also ==
- List of metro systems
- List of North American rapid transit systems by ridership
- List of tram and light rail transit systems
- List of suburban and commuter rail systems
- List of United States light rail systems by ridership
- List of North American light rail systems by ridership
- List of United States commuter rail systems by ridership
- List of United States local bus agencies by ridership
