= List of United States commuter rail systems =

The following is a list of commuter rail systems in the United States, ranked by ridership. All figures come from the American Public Transportation Association's Public Transportation Ridership Report as of the second quarter of 2026, unless otherwise indicated.

== List ==
Rank	System	Major cities served	Annual ridership 2025	Average ridership weekdays, Q2 2026	Route length	Average ridership per mile weekdays, Q2 2026	Year Opened	Lines	Stations
1	Long Island Rail Road	New York / Long Island	103,474,900	328,300	321 miles (517 km)	862	1834	11	124
2	Metro-North Railroad	New York / Stamford / New Haven	71,758,600	274,700	385 miles (620 km)	611	1983	5 (Note: There are 3 lines operated directly by Metro North, the Harlem Line, Hudson Line, and New Haven Line. The Port Jervis Line is operated under contract by NJ Transit, which also owns the Pascack Valley Line that extends into New York. The New Haven Line has 3 branch lines, the New Canaan Branch, Danbury Branch, and Waterbury Branch.)	122
3	NJ Transit Rail Operations	New York / Newark / Trenton / Philadelphia	62,029,400	140,666 (Note: This is the Average Daily Ridership figure, not an "Average Weekday Ridership" figure – it is averaged from the 2023 First Quarter Ridership figure for this system.)	530 miles (850 km)	265	1983	11	164
4	Metra	Chicago, IL	37,950,100	167,400	487.5 miles (784.6 km)	346	1984	11	243
5	MBTA Commuter Rail	Boston / Worcester / Providence	29,707,200	111,600	429 miles (690 km)	282	1973	12	142
6	SEPTA Regional Rail	Philadelphia / Trenton / Wilmington	22,771,200	84,700	280 miles (450 km)	278	1983	13	153
7	Caltrain	San Francisco / San Jose	11,212,300	45,800	77 miles (124 km)	321	1863	1	32
8	RTD Commuter Rail	Denver	8,644,700	37,800	54.09 miles (87.05 km)	518	2016	4	22
9	Metrolink	Los Angeles / San Bernardino / Anaheim / Riverside / Irvine	6,063,500	20,700	545.7 miles (878.2 km)	35	1992	7	62
10	MARC Train	Baltimore / Washington, D.C.	5,222,500	20,800	187 miles (301 km)	74	1984	3	43
11	Tri-Rail	Miami / Fort Lauderdale	4,924,100	13,400	80 miles (130 km)	193	1987	2	19
12	FrontRunner	Salt Lake City	4,141,900	14,800	88 miles (142 km)	170	2008	1	16
13	Virginia Railway Express	Washington, D.C.	2,364,000	8,500	90 miles (140 km)	70	1992	2	18
14	South Shore Line	Chicago / South Bend	2,029,900	7,100	99 miles (159 km)	70	1908	2	21
15	Sounder commuter rail	Seattle / Tacoma	1,981,100	7,800	82 miles (132 km)	88	2000	2	12
16	eBART	Contra Costa County, CA	1,431,700	5,200	10.1 miles (16.3 km)	446	2018	1	3
17	Keystone Service	Philadelphia / Harrisburg	1,380,000	4,500	104.6 miles (168.3 km)	31	1972	1	12
18	Trinity Railway Express	Dallas / Fort Worth	1,337,600	6,700	34 miles (55 km)	121	1996	1	10
19	Sonoma–Marin Area Rail Transit	San Rafael / Santa Rosa	1,329,300	5,200	48 miles (77 km)	76	2017	1	14
20	SunRail	Greater Orlando, Florida	1,322,500	5,600	49 miles (79 km)	94	2014	1	17
21	Capitol Corridor	San Jose / Oakland / Sacramento	1,194,500	1,847 (Note: Q4 2022)	168 miles (270 km)	11	1991	1	15
22	Coaster	San Diego / Oceanside	993,300	3,500	41 miles (66 km)	73	1995	1	8
23	TEXRail	Fort Worth	906,800	2,800	27 miles (43 km)	81	2019	1	9
24	Rail Runner Express	Albuquerque / Santa Fe	771,100	3,600	97 miles (156 km)	29	2006	1	13
25	Altamont Corridor Express	San Jose / Stockton	763,800	2,900	86 miles (138 km)	36	1998	1	10
26	CapMetro Rail	Austin	620,600	1,900	32 miles (51 km)	50	2010	1	10
27	Downeaster	Boston / Brunswick, ME	591,948	1,219	148 miles (238 km)	8	2001	1	12
28	A-Train	Denton, TX	277,300	1,000	21 miles (34 km)	48	2011	1	6
29	Shore Line East	New Haven	246,600	900	90 miles (140 km)	18 (Note: Only one daily round trip runs the full 90-mile route. All other trips run only the 50 miles (80 km) between New Haven and New London. This figure uses the latter distance.)	1990	1	13
30	WeGo Star	Nashville	153,900	600	32 miles (51 km)	16	2006	1	7
31	WES Commuter Rail	Beaverton, OR, Wilsonville	125,400	500	14.7 miles (23.7 km)	20	2009	1	5

== Systems excluded from ridership table ==
System	Largest city(s) served	Opened	Route length (mi)	Reason(s) for exclusion from Ridership table
Hartford Line	Hartford / New Haven / Springfield	2018	63	APTA does not provide ridership figures for this system.
Silver Line	Dallas	2025	26	This system is currently too new for APTA to provide ridership figures.
PATH	New York / Newark / Hudson County	1908	14	Despite legally being a commuter railroad under the jurisdiction of the FRA, the PATH functions and operates as a rapid transit system.

== See also ==
- Commuter rail in North America
- List of rail transit systems in the United States
- List of United States light rail systems
- List of United States local bus agencies
- List of United States rapid transit systems
