= Mountain House, California (disambiguation) =

Mountain House, California is a city in San Joaquin County, California, U.S.

It may also refer to:

- Mountain House, Alameda County, California, an historical waystop for travelers on the eastern base of the Diablo Range
- Mountain House, Butte County, California, now Brush Creek
- Mountain House, Kern County, California
- Mountain House Creek, a creek in Alameda and San Joaquin Counties, California
