= The Click List =

The Click List may refer to:

- The Click List: Best in Short Film, an anthology series of LGBT-themed short films
- The Click List: Top 10 Videos, a music video TV show
