= Marilyn McIntyre =

American television and film actress (born 1949)

- Born: May 23, 1949 (age 77); Erie, Pennsylvania, U.S.
- Education: University of North Carolina School of the Arts (BFA); Pennsylvania State University (MFA)
- Occupation: Actress
- Years active: 1968–present

Marilyn McIntyre (born May 23, 1949) is an American television and film actress.

== Early life and education ==
McIntyre was born in Erie, Pennsylvania, the daughter of Jeanne Ellen (née Corzilius) and Roger McIntyre, an aeronautical engineer. She received her training and a Bachelor of Fine Arts degree at the North Carolina School of the Arts, and her Master of Fine Arts degree in the graduate program at Pennsylvania State University.

== Career ==
McIntyre started her career in theatre stage performances and appeared in leading roles on Broadway, Off & Off Off Broadway and in many of the country's leading regional theaters, including the Arena Stage (Washington, DC), Mark Taper Forum, South Coast Repertory, Houston's Alley Theatre, Missouri Rep, Walnut Street Theatre, and many others.

Her film appearances include the recent hit of several shorts film festivals, Into the Unknown, starring opposite her real-life significant other, James Harper; the smash-hit short, George Lucas in Love (1999); First Daughter (2004), What's Bugging Seth (2005), and The Ring Two (2005).

She had contract (series regular) roles in the television series Watch Over Me, Days of Our Lives, One Life to Live, Loving, and Search for Tomorrow, and recurring guest star roles on L.A. Law, Judging Amy, General Hospital: Night Shift, General Hospital, The Young and the Restless, and Ryan's Hope. Ms. McIntyre has had guest star roles on numerous television series including The Equalizer, Chicago Hope, The X-Files, Dark Skies, among others.

McIntyre is an acting teacher and coach, currently teaching at California State University Northridge, North Carolina's Elon University summer program, "Elon in LA: Climing the LAdder", and the private Howard Fine Acting Studio and Ted Brunetti Studio, both in Hollywood.

== Filmography ==
=== Film ===
Marilyn McIntyre film credits
Year	Title	Role	Notes
1999	George Lucas in Love		Short
2004	First Daughter	Teacher at Party	
2005	What's Bugging Seth	Fran	
2005	The Ring Two	Mother of Emily	

=== Television ===
Marilyn McIntyre television credits
Year	Title	Role	Notes
1977–1980	Search for Tomorrow	Dr. Carolyn Hanley	Recurring
1980	One Life to Live	Dr. Ward	3 episodes
1981–1983	One Life to Live	Astrid Collins	Recurring
1982	Ryan's Hope	Sydney Galloway	Recurring
1983–1984	Loving	Noreen Vocheck Donovan, R.N.	4 episodes
1988	The Equalizer	Maureen	Episode: "A Dance on the Dark Side"
1992	L.A. Law	Nadine Greenzaid	2 episodes
1993–2006	Days of Our Lives	Jo Johnson	Recurring
1995	The Young and the Restless	Marry Hoffman	Recurring
1997	Dark Skies	Dorothy Kilgallen	1 episode
1997	Chicago Hope	Deborah Kagan	1 episode
1999	The X-Files	Widow	1 episode
2000–2001	Judging Amy	Ellen's Mother	2 episodes
2006–2007	Watch Over Me	Helen Porter	Recurring
2007	General Hospital: Night Shift	Lori Thompson	4 episodes
