= MHHS =

MHHS may refer to:

- Mundaring and Hills Historical Society in Mundaring, Western Australia, Australia

== Schools ==
- Medicine Hat High School, Medicine Hat, Alberta, Canada
- Morris Hills High School, Rockaway, New Jersey, United States
- Mountain Home High School (Arkansas), Mountain Home, Arkansas, United States
- Mountain Home High School (Idaho), Mountain Home, Idaho, United States
- Mt. Hope High School, Bristol, Rhode Island, United States
- Mission Hills High School, San Marcos, California, United States
- Mountain House High School, Mountain House, California, United States
