= Ross Thomas =

Ross Thomas may refer to:

- Ross Thomas (author) (1926–1995), American writer of crime fiction
- Ross Thomas (actor) (born 1981), American actor, filmmaker, philanthropist and adventurer
