= Tom Christopher =

American painter

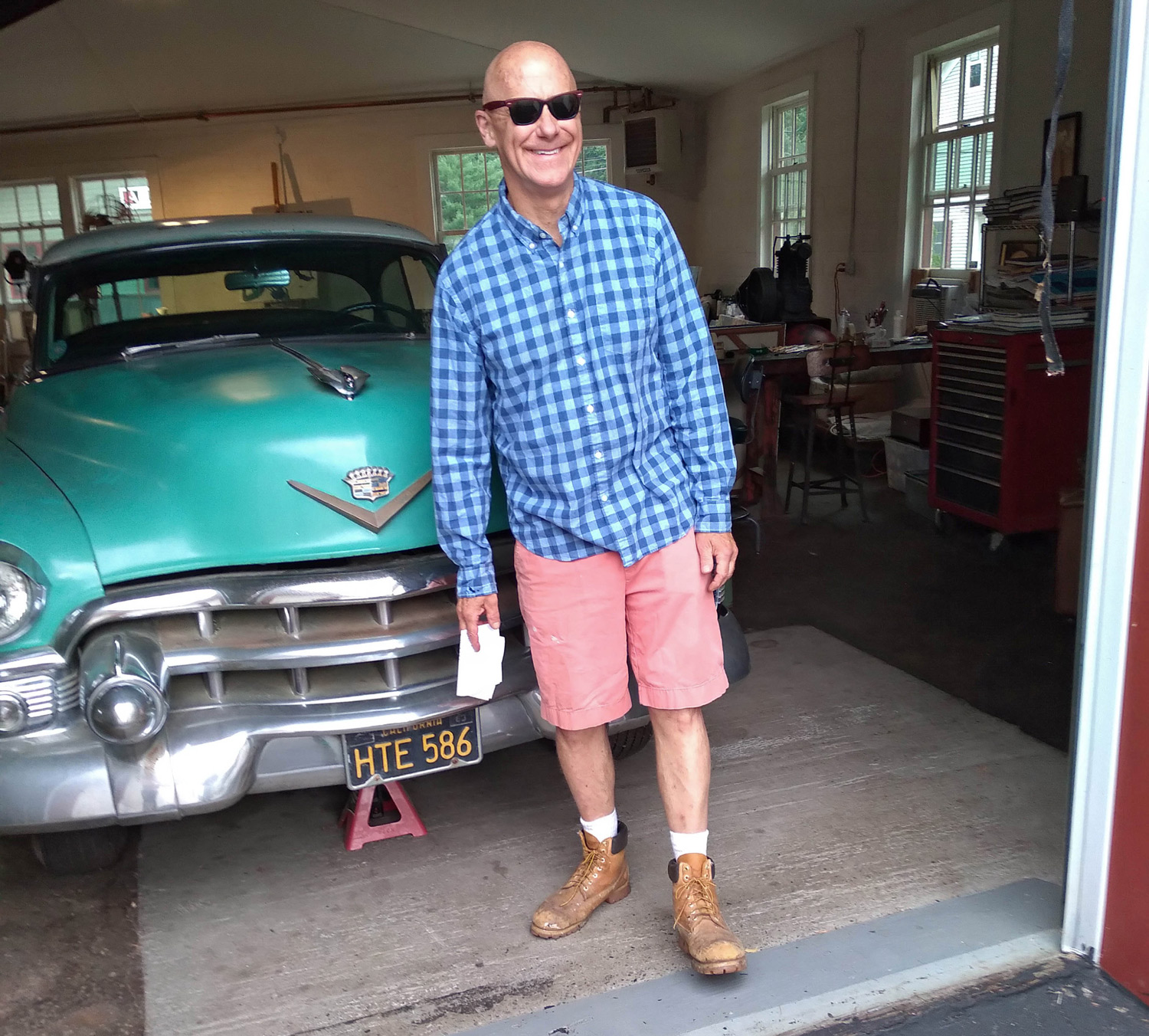
- Christopher in his studio
- Born: 1952 (age 73–74); Hollywood, California, U.S.
- Education: Art Center College of Design, Pasadena, California
- Known for: Painting
- Website: tomchristopher.nyc

Tom Christopher (born 1952) is an American painter known for his expressionist urban paintings and murals, mostly of New York City. Christopher began as a commercial artist, and has become internationally recognized with galleries and exhibitions in France, Germany and Japan.

== Life and art ==
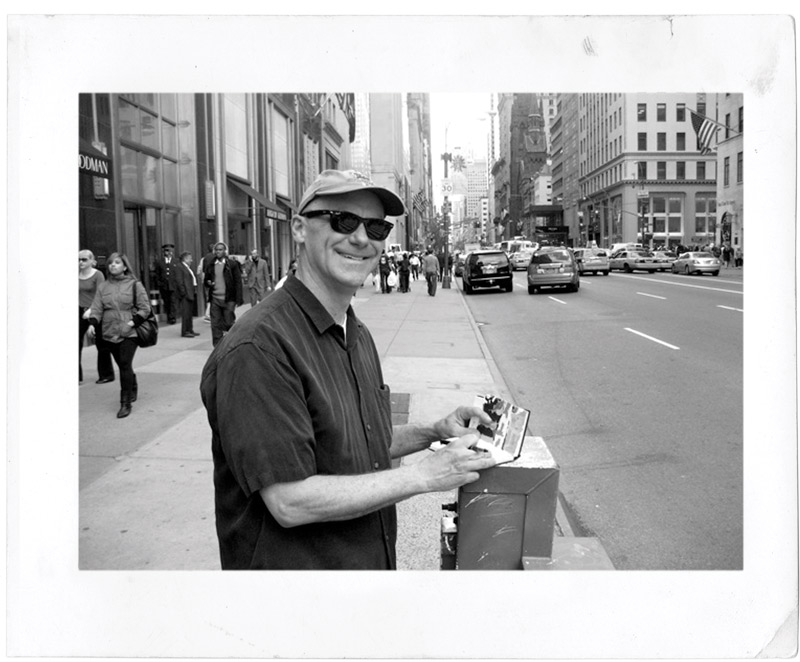
Christopher sketching on the streets of New York

=== Early life and work ===
Christopher was born in Hollywood, California. He initially studied at the Pasadena Museum of California Art in 1974. He then went Art Center College of Design in Pasadena to receive his Bachelor in Fine Arts in 1979 where he studied with the noted California artists Lorser Feitelson and Ward Kimball. He supported himself during school by doing drawings at Disney in Anaheim. Christopher grew up "in the LA hot rod / skateboard culture" which influenced his art. Christopher started his art career with commercial art in California. His first work was for CBS Records. He received a gold record for his work on promotional posters. He also worked for Motor Trend magazine with photographer Bill Claxton depicting the Las Vegas Grand Prix and Mille Miglia races. In 1981 he moved to New York City, and worked for the New York Times, People, Fortune and Wall Street Journal, as well as a courtroom artist for CBS news, covering trials as diverse as John Lennon's shooter and "The Diet Doc Killer" Jean Harris.

=== Transition to fine art ===
Christopher began creating fine art in the mid 80's painting household objects and tools on a "Brobdingnagian scale" in addition to making cast-iron sculptures, which were featured "in galleries in the East Village". These works were most notably featured in Socrates Sculpture Park, Oil and Steel Gallery (L.I.C. NY 1992) and the "Tools as Art: The Hechinger Collection" at National Building Museum Washington D.C. (1990s).

=== Transition to current style ===
The early 1990s also marked the start of Tom Christopher's signature NYC paintings. The first gallery to feature this was the Saint Marks Gallery in 1990. After receiving more success and reception with this style, he slowly switched to primarily this style in the 90's, and "Now his subject matter is largely focused on the streets of New York."

Christopher’s work is shown internationally in Europe and Japan. He currently works out of his studio, Lift Trucks Project in North Salem, New York. Most paintings are exhibited overseas to international art fairs and galleries in Frankfurt, Paris, Osaka and Tokyo.

== Projects ==
=== Set Design for "Satchmo at the Waldorf" ===
The Schoolhouse Theater launched its landmark 40th season with Satchmo at the Waldorf, a one-man play about the legendary jazz musician Louis Armstrong. Directed by Schoolhouse’s Producing Director Bram Lewis this production explores the highs and lows of Armstrong’s groundbreaking career and personal struggles. Broadway World has called Tom Christopher’s set design “stylistically smart.” which "qualifies as a synonym for genius."

=== A Mural for the Katonah Museum of Art ===
Tom Christopher collaborated with 13 art students to create a mural for the Katonah Museum to celebrate its 40th anniversary. Christopher summed it up this way: “This project was to create a mural expressing the dreams of 13 artists at age 40. Where do they see themselves at that age? Distill this thought to a single object that would express the thought or something they might carry with them into the future. We will paint that image over an expressionistic background in the lobby of the museum.”

=== Virtual reality fine art installations ===
Partnering with the Fashion Institute of Technology's Department of Fine Art Media Laboratory, Tom Christopher and students from FIT will create three Bronx-specific VR experiences for the Montefiore Medical Center. Patients will experience the environment seeking to diminish anxiety, pain and opioid addiction through stimulus-rich, curated artistic environments. The FIT Exhibition: The Future Is Immersive has featured some of Tom Christopher's work.

The first of three projects is a virtual city block, made up of elements from different streets to create a "virtual" city block typical of the South Bronx. Christopher and students sketched on site and took photographs which were used to make preliminary drawings before translating via Tilt Brush into a virtual 3D canvas. "The process allows you to blow it up to the size of a billboard, or shrink it to the size of an ant. Walk through or around or hover from above.

=== Paseo Caribe Mural Project ===
In 2016 Tom Christopher collaborated with art students from Escuela de Artes Plásticas y Diseño to create a 4,000 square feet (370 m^{2}) public space mural. Originally in the El Mercado public square, these murals are in the process of being transferred to the Luis Munoz International Airport, San Juan.

=== Brill Building ===
In the summer of 2014, Tom Christopher and Oscar Andy Hammerstein took a studio residence in the Brill Building windows during its renovations. The art project was conducted as an installation and an inside look into the artistic process. The subject matter was Times Square and the streets of New York City.

=== Printmaking ===
Christopher has been experimenting with collage-style paintings and silkscreens that utilize multiple images and layers with Master Printer Gary Lichtenstein. They had a show together at Aldrich Contemporary Art Museum, Ridgefield, Connecticut entitled "35 Years of Screenprinting".

=== Lift Trucks Project ===
In 2010 Christopher founded Lift Trucks Project in Croton Falls, New York. It is an alternative art space with exhibitions featuring works from FA-Q, Christo, Ottmar Hoerl, Ed Roth ("Big Daddy"), A. R. Penck, Sailor Jerry, and others.

== Classifications ==
Christopher is known for his New York City urban paintings. Most of the work is painted using small-batch, handmade acrylic paint. Pencil lines from the initial exploratory sketch stage often remain on the white canvass. His typical images include cabbies, delivery men, skylines, and chaotic New York City scenes. His work is usually done with acrylic paint in an expressionist style.

== Critical reception ==
Christopher is most notable in the New York City art scene, with mostly positive reviews from sources such as The New York Times. One article features a quote by former NYC Mayor Rudolph Giuliani, who stated "Tom has an uncanny talent for capturing the essence of New York City from the perspective of those who have enjoyed the sights of the city on foot."

He has also received acclaim through his museum exhibitions: he was included in the 1999 "New, New York Views" exhibition at Museum of the City of New York, and recently had a "Metropolis" exhibition at Butler Institute of American Art. The Butler Institute of American Art Director and Chief Curator Dr. Louis A. Zona stated that Christopher "...has bridged the gap between pure narrative painting and expressionist abstraction. He has become to American painting what Count Basie or Duke Ellington became to American popular music, not completely jazz but certainly owing much to Charlie Parker and Charlie Mingus."

== Commercial applications ==
Ikepod Watch has started a Tom Christopher Art Series to compliment its past collaborations with artists Jeff Koons and pop arts KAWS. Tom Christopher and watchmaker Ikepod have collaborated on new models featuring Christopher's work on the watch face by designer Marc Newson. A clothing line by Illusions was introduced in 2020. In 2019 Christopher's studio and flash art collection was featured on American Pickers. Christopher has done work on a line of clothing with Urban Outfitters and Nordstrom entitled "Threads 4 Thought". He also was commissioned by Michel Roux for the "Absolut Collection" for Absolut Vodka and was included in the "Absolut Book" by Richard Lewis. Christopher has also designed a "Cruzer" line of snowboards for Burton Snowboards. In addition, he was commissioned to paint an oversized baseball for the New York Yankees for their 2000 game against the Atlanta Braves.

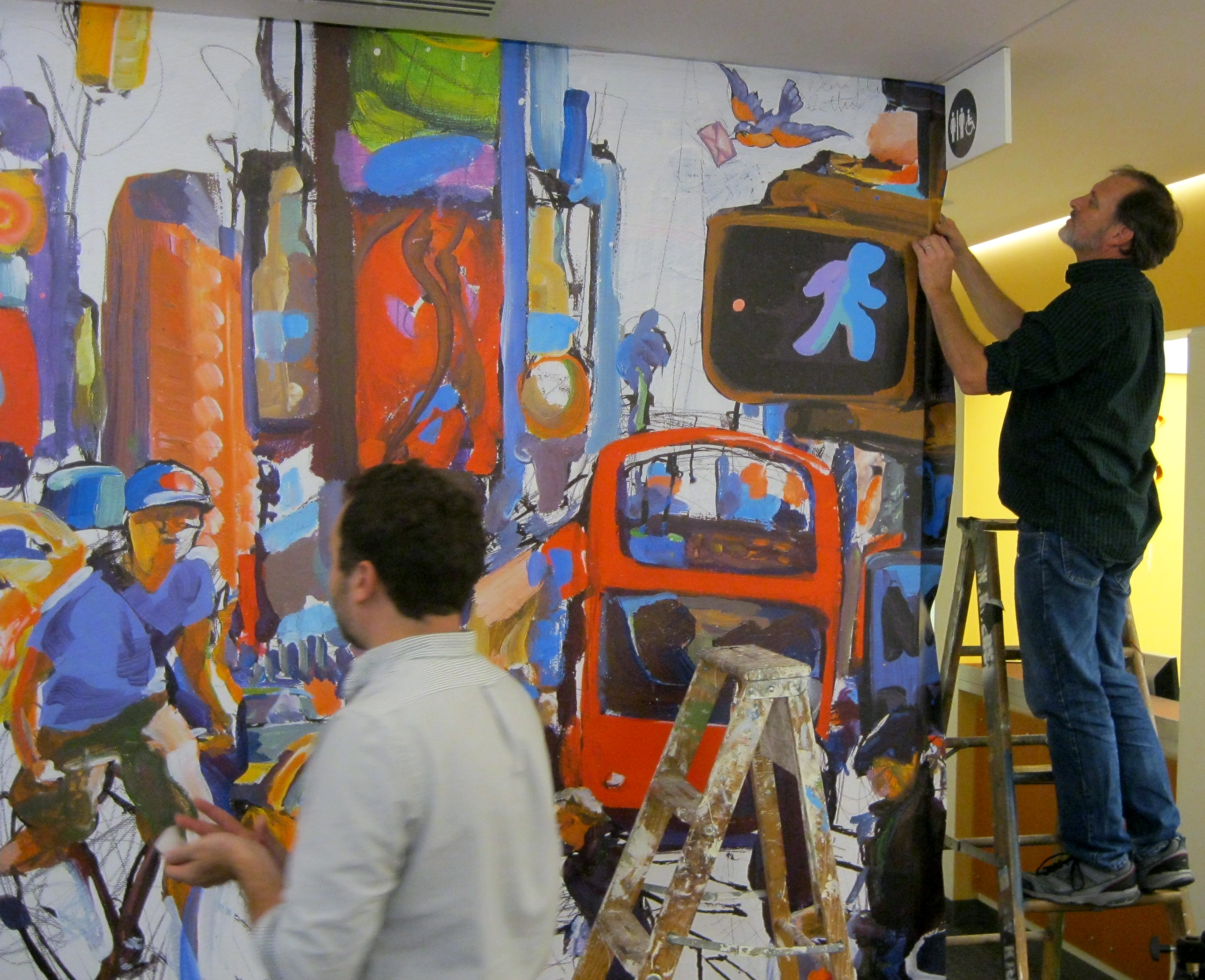
Tom Christopher, I Like New York Because Everything Interesting Can Be Found There, 2012, The NYU Langone Medical Center Art Collection

== Exhibitions ==
Selected solo exhibitions

- St. Marks Gallery New York 1990
- Eastmann Wahmendorf Gallery, Helio Gallery, New York 1990
- Tamenaga Gallery, New York: 1993, 1994
- Michael Owen Gallery, New York: 1996
- David Findlay Galleries, New York: 1997, 1998, 2000, 2002, 2005
- Galerie Tamenaga, Tokyo, Osaka: 1997, 1999, 2002, 2004, 2007, 2010
- Galerie Tamenaga, Paris: 1999, 2001, 2004, 2006, 2009, 2011, 2013, 2014, 2015, 2016
- Galerie Barbara von Stechow, Frankfurt: 1999, 2002, 2004, 2007, 2009, 2012, 2013, 2014, 2015, 2016
- Galerie Vomel, Düsseldorf: 2004, 2006, 2010
- Van Brunt Gallery, Beacon, NY: 2007
- Conde Nast Building, NYC Per Cent for Art Commission, 2007
- The Butler Institute of American Art, Youngstown Ohio: May 2008
- HSBC, Trinkaus and Burkhardt, Frankfurt: 2007, Hamburg: 2008
- J.N. Bartfield Gallery New York: 2008, 2015, 2016
- Brill Building Project, New York, NY, 2014
- The Future is Immersive Fashion Institute of Technology, New York, NY 2019
- The New Yorkers, a solo exhibition in Frankfurt Germany by Galerie Barbara von Stechow, 2019
- Life Before A Pandemic, an exhibition at Laverdin Gallery, 445 Park Avenue, NYC, 2020
- Tom Christopher, a solo exhibition in Frankfurt Germany by Galerie Barbara von Stechow, 2021
- Tom Christopher, a one-man exhibition at Galerie Tamenaga, 2022
- Tom Christopher, a one-man exhibition at Galerie Tamenaga, Tokyo and Osaka 2023
- Tom Christopher, a one-man exhibition at Galerie Barbara von Stechow, 2023
- I'm Going to Paint Like it's 1999, a one-man exhibition at Galerie Barbara von Stechow 2025
- Rooms, Not Walls: Paintings in Lived Space 2026

Selected group exhibitions

- The Clocktower Center for Art & Urban Resources, New York: 1980
- East Village Artists, Tokyo], Japan: 1985
- "Tools" San Francisco Arts Commission Gallery, San Francisco: 1988
- Socrates Sculpture Park, Oil and Steel Gallery L.I.C. NY 1992
- "Kustom Kulture" The Works Gallery, Los Angeles: 1993
- "Cityscapes" The Roger Smith Gallery, New York: 1993
- "Modern Times" Katonah Museum of Art, Katonah: 1993
- "New, New York Views" Museum of the City of New York City: 1999
- Art Cologne, Germany, 2000
- "Art for America" Benefit: Twin Towers Fund, New York: 2002
- "City Rhythms" Pelham Art Center, Pelham, NY: 2002
- "Kunstakademie, Kunsthalle Trier, Germany": 2002
- "Hessische Landesvertretung" Berlin: 2004
- "New Views: Modern NY Cityscapes" The New York Historical Society Museum: 2004
- "At the Crossroads of Desire" The AXA Gallery, New York: 2004
- FIAC, Paris 2005
- "PRINT- Andy Warhol, Ken Price, Tom Christopher" – Ward Pound Ridge, New York 2006
- Galerie Mada Primavesi, Madrid: 2007
- 35 years of Printmaking, Aldrich Contemporary Art Museum, CT 2010
- Greg Hubert Gallery, New York, NY, 2012
- Art Brussels, 2014
- Carrousel du Louvre, Paris, France 2015
- Art Karlsruhe, 2015
- Art Kunst Zurich, 2015
- Art Miami, 2016
- Art New York, 2016
- Art Karlsruhe, 2016
- Avenue of the Americans, 2016
- Contemporary Art Fair Zurich, 2017
- Art Miami, 2017
- Art Karlsruhe, 2018
- Art Fair Tokyo, 2018
- Art New York, 2018
- Art Zurich, 2018
- Art Miami, 2108
- Brussels Art Fair, 2019
- Paper Positions Art Fair, Munich, Frankfurt and Berlin, 2019
- Karlsruhe Art Fair, 2020
- Dreaming Together: New-York Historical Society and Asia Society Museum, 2020-2021
- Big City Symphony, Tom Christopher, Detlef Waschkau and Thomas Kellner, New Art Association Aschaffenburg eV 2021
- Salon Du Dessin, 2022
- Paris Gallery Weekend 2022
- Art Karlsruhe 2022
- Kunst Zürich 2022
- Art Karlsruhe 2023
- Volta Basel and New York 2023
- Art Miami 2023
- Art Karlsruhe 2024
- Pop-Up Exhibition in conjunction with Art Basel Hong Kong 2025
- Art Miami 2025

Selected public installations

- 2016 – Paseo Caribe Mural Project, San Juan, Puerto Rico
- 2012 – NYU Langone Medical Center, Mural, "I Like New York Because Everything Interesting Can Be Found There," 10' x 30' New York City
- 2006, 2007 – Times Square Project, Times Square, New York
- 2004 – The New York Historical Society Museum, installation of chair, easel, and painting
- 1998 – MTA, "Art in Transit" Subway Art Series, New York
- 1997 – Roseland Mural, 30' x 230', West 53rd Street, New York (Now demolished)
- 1988 — "Mason's Trowel" automotive enamel, 20' x 65’ Socrates Sculpture Park
- 1988 — "Floating I Beam" automotive enamel,130'x 35' Socrates Sculpture Park
- "HammerBrush" bronze, dm various
