= Dark Skies (TV series) =

Television series

- Genre: Science fiction; Drama; Conspiracy fiction
- Created by: Brent V. Friedman; Bryce Zabel
- Starring: Eric Close; Megan Ward; J. T. Walsh; Tim Kelleher; Conor O'Farrell; Charley Lang; Jeri Ryan
- Composer: Michael Hoenig
- Country of origin: United States
- Original language: English
- No. of seasons: 1
- No. of episodes: 19

Production
- Executive producers: Brent V. Friedman; Bryce Zabel
- Producers: Bruce M. Kerner (pilot); Brad Markowitz (ep.2-19)
- Production companies: Bryce Zabel Productions; Columbia Pictures Television

Original release
- Network: NBC
- Release: September 21, 1996 – May 31, 1997

Dark Skies is an American UFO conspiracy theory-based science fiction television series. It debuted on NBC on September 21, 1996, and ended on May 31, 1997, and was later rerun by the Sci-Fi Channel; 18 episodes and a two-hour pilot episode were broadcast as a part of NBC's short-lived "Thrillogy" block. The success of The X-Files on FOX resulted in NBC commissioning this proposed competitor following a pitch from producers Bryce Zabel and Brent Friedman. The series tagline was "History as we know it is a lie."

== Series overview ==
The series presents the idea that 20th-century history as people know it is a lie. It depicts aliens having been among humans since the late 1940s, with a government cover-up concealing their existence from the public. As the series progresses, viewers follow John Loengard and Kim Sayers through the 1960s as they attempt to foil the plots of the alien "Hive". The Hive is an alien race that planned to invade Earth through a manipulation of historical events and famous figures, including most notably the assassination of President John F. Kennedy. In addition, the pair must stay one step ahead of Majestic 12, a covert government agency that has mixed motives. The show depicted a number of real-life 1960s personalities in the plot, such as The Beatles, Robert F. Kennedy, Jim Morrison, and J. Edgar Hoover.

The series was cancelled before the end of the first season, due to low ratings. Although the last episode produced provided some closure for the series, the show's creators had hoped to create five seasons, as indicated by the show's Bible. According to Zabel and Friedman's original plan, the pilot and first season (given the overall title "Official Denial") would cover the period from 1961 to 1969, the second season ("Progenitor") 1970 to 1976, the third season ("Cloak of Fear") 1977 to 1986, the fourth season ("New World Order") would cover 1987 to 1999, and the fifth and final season ("Stroke of Midnight") would break from the decade-spanning format to encompass the apocalyptic final conflict against the invaders, taking place from 2000 to 2001.

=== The Hive ===
The series depicts the Hive as an alien species who are covertly invading Earth. They are a parasitic race of small multilegged, spider-like beings that can take control of host bodies, by attaching themselves to the brain. They do this by entering through orifices on the head, commonly the mouth, though they are also shown to enter by squeezing through the nose and ears, with great discomfort to the host. Due to the way they attach themselves to the brain's ganglion regions, the series' protagonists dub the creatures "Ganglions".

Various stages from Alpha to Delta occur that show varying degrees of the infection. Initial symptoms of take-over include drastic mood swings, behavioral abnormalities, and nervous breakdowns, as the parasite adjusts to taking control of the person's mind. Past medical records of a nervous breakdown are a tell-tale sign that someone may have been taken over. The Gamma and Delta stages are where the Hive organism takes total control over the host, which becomes nothing more than a shell for the invading organism.

Not all humans make acceptable hosts for the Ganglions. Due to certain genetic factors, a few humans are incompatible with the Ganglions' biology; these have been dubbed "Throwbacks". In several cases, a group of people are abducted and taken over by Ganglion parasites, but a Throwback in the group is not infected and simply returned, often because killing them would be too conspicuous. Captured Ganglion parasites have been injected with the blood of Throwbacks, causing them to die in agony. The Hive is running various experiments to try to either eliminate Throwbacks or develop more humans who are easier to control, such as growing cloned human babies in cows.

Some time ago, the Ganglions invaded an advanced alien race, dubbed the "Greys"—the typical depiction of a Roswell Grey alien. The Greys were a race not unlike humans, though they possessed technology making them capable of interstellar travel. The Ganglion parasites invaded them in much the same way that they are trying to invade Earth now, and by the time they realized what was happening, it was too late. Thus, the "Grey aliens" seen abducting humans are really just as much a slave race or "shells" for the Ganglions as the infected humans are.

The Hive's language, Thhtmaa, was developed by University of California, Los Angeles, graduate student Matt Pearson. Pearson went on to become a professor of linguistics at Reed College.

When the Ganglions were evolving, apparently before they took over other animals as hosts, they had a natural predator — slug-like creatures called "buzz worms". They have actually brought samples of the buzz worms along with them with their ships, using them as a particularly gruesome means of executing their own kind.

== Cast ==
=== Main ===
- Eric Close as John Loengard
- Megan Ward as Kimberly Sayers
- J. T. Walsh as Frank Bach
- Tim Kelleher as Jim Steele
- Conor O'Farrell as Phil Albano
- Charley Lang as Dr. Halligan
- Jeri Ryan as Juliet Stuart

=== Notable guests, based on real-life 1960s figures ===
- Art Bell as William Paley
- Arell Blanton as General Nathan Farragut Twining
- Wolfgang Bodison as Colin Powell
- Robert Carradine as Lonnie Zamora
- Bryan Clark as President Ronald Reagan
- Dennis Creaghan as J. Lee Rankin
- Carey Eidel as Brian Epstein
- Richard Fancy as James Forrestal
- Brent David Fraser as Jim Morrison
- Richard Gilliland as Jesse Marcel
- Paul Gleason as Governor Nelson Rockefeller
- Susan Griffiths as Marilyn Monroe
- Carmine Grippo as Ringo Starr
- Jerome Patrick Hoban as Ed Sullivan
- Gunther Jenson as Captain Norman Schwarzkopf
- James F. Kelly as Robert Kennedy
- Mike Kennedy as Allen Dulles
- James Lancaster as Kenneth Parkinson
- Jack Lindine as Jack Ruby
- Gary Lockwood as Chief Justice Earl Warren
- Tim Michael McDougall as Paul McCartney
- Marilyn McIntyre as Dorothy Kilgallen
- Don Moss as Senator Hubert Humphrey
- Don Most as Dr. Timothy Leary
- Rick Anthony Pizaria as George Harrison
- Hansford Rowe as President Harry S. Truman
- Leon Russom as Admiral Roscoe H. Hillenkoetter
- Mitchell Ryan as William S. Paley
- Joe Stefanelli as John Lennon
- Wayne Tippit as J. Edgar Hoover
- Joe Urla as Dr. Carl Sagan
- Peter Van Norden as Henry Kissinger
- Sam Whipple as J. Allen Hynek

== Episodes ==
On the original broadcast in 1996, Episode 6 "Ancient Future" and Episode 7 "Inhuman Nature" were shown in chronological order as indicated by the dates the episodes are set. ("Ancient Future" is set in March 1964, while "Inhuman Nature" is set in April 1964.)

No.	Title	Directed by	Written by	Original release date
1	"The Awakening"	Tobe Hooper	Brent V. Friedman & Bryce Zabel	September 21, 1996
1960–1962: Congressional Aide John Loengard is drawn into an investigation of Project Blue Book and finds himself confronted by its shadowy architects, known as Majestic 12.
2	"Moving Targets"	Thomas J. Wright	Brent V. Friedman & Bryce Zabel	September 28, 1996
November 23, 1963: The assassination of JFK sets the backdrop as John and Kim visit Jesse Marcel and discover the origins of how Majestic 12 came to be in July 1947.
3	"Mercury Rising"	Tucker Gates	James D. Parriott	October 19, 1996
January 30, 1964: When Kim has visions of an astronaut being abducted by the Hive, she and John head to Florida as Ranger 6 prepares to send NASA the first close-up pictures of the lunar surface.
4	"Dark Days Night"	Matthew Penn	Story by : Brent V. Friedman & Bryce Zabel; Teleplay by : Brent V. Friedman & Brad Markowitz	October 26, 1996
February 6, 1964: While in New York, John and Kim discover a Hive plot to hijack the Beatles' broadcast on The Ed Sullivan Show and activate their latest agenda for world domination.
5	"Dreamland"	Winrich Kolbe	Steve Apsis	November 2, 1996
Early March, 1964: Following a lead to Las Vegas, John and Kim are tasked by none other than Howard Hughes to help stop a Hive invasion of Area 51, also known as Dreamland.
6	"Ancient Future"	Lou Antonio	James D. Parriot & Gay Walch	November 16, 1996
March 27, 1964: When The Good Friday earthquake reveals a 2,000-year-old spacecraft buried in the Alaskan wilderness, John and Kim must make a deal with Majestic 12 to prevent Armageddeon.
7	"Inhuman Nature"	Rodman Flender	Melissa Rosenberg	November 9, 1996
April 11, 1964: In Wisconsin, John and Kim discover that recent episodes of cattle mutilation may be masking a Hive plot to create the perfect genetic weapon.
8	"Hostile Convergence"	David Jackson	Story by : Brent V. Friedman & Bryce Zabel; Teleplay by : Javier Grillo-Marxuach	December 7, 1996
April 24, 1964: Lonnie Zamora's claim of a close encounter in Socorro, New Mexico puts John and Jesse Marcel on the trail of secret UFO blueprints one step ahead of Majestic 12.
9	"We Shall Overcome"	Jim Charleston	Bryce Zabel	December 14, 1996
June 21, 1964: Amidst the murders of Chaney, Goodman, and Schwerner, John meets Mark Simonson (Raphael Sbarge), his former supervisor from Congressman Pratt’s office.
10	"The Last Wave"	Perry Lang	Melissa Rosenberg	January 4, 1997
July 21, 1964: John and Kim go to Los Angeles for the funeral of an old college friend and discover a Hive plot to contaminate the water supply which they stop with the help of a young Jim Morrison.
11	"The Enemy Within"	Jim Charleston	Story by : Brent V. Friedman & Bryce Zabel; Teleplay by : Brad Markowitz	January 11, 1997
August 19, 1964: John visits his family in Fresno, California in order to cash in a couple of savings bonds for money to keep them going, only to discover his brother has been implanted by the Hive.
12	"The Warren Omission"	Perry Lang	Brent V. Friedman & Bryce Zabel	January 18, 1997
Late August, 1964: John gives testimony to the Warren Commission regarding Captain Bach and Majestic 12's involvement in the JFK Assassination.
13	"White Rabbit"	James A. Contner	Brent V. Friedman	February 1, 1997
Early September, 1964: John and Bach go on a top secret mission near Laos, Vietnam in search of some missing AURA-Z operatives and a Hive saucer that has been shot down.
14	"Shades of Gray"	Perry Lang	Brad Markowitz	February 8, 1997
Mid October, 1964: A plan is hatched to shoot down a Hive saucer. This leads to a gray alien being captured and a "cerebral eviction" being performed to remove its Hive ganglion.
15	"Burn, Baby, Burn"	Steve Posey	James D. Parriott	March 1, 1997
August 10, 1965: With the help of Majestic 12, John and Kim travel to California amidst the Watts Riots to have their baby. Kim is abducted by the Hive from hospital and implanted, and her baby is taken.
16	"Both Sides Now"	James A. Conter	Melissa Rosenberg	March 8, 1997
September 25, 1965: Kim is spotted in Berkeley, California working with a group of anti-war activists and Jim Steel. She chooses her son over John and "crosses over" becoming fully Hive.
17	"To Prey in Darkness"	Thomas J. Wright	Brent V. Friedman & Bryce Zabel	March 15, 1997
November 7, 1965: A piece of film taken at the 1947 Roswell Incident goes missing from the Majestic 12 HQ. John and Juliet are ordered to retrieve it before it is revealed to the public. This leads to the Northeast blackout of 1965.
18	"Strangers in the Night"	Michael Levine	Brad Markowitz	May 24, 1997
August 19, 1966: Majestic 12 send a team, which includes John, Juliet and Major Colin Powell, to the AURA-Z Command Center in Chernobyl, USSR after they are attacked by a group of escaped prisoners. Also, at this time Bach enlists the help of Dr Carl Sagan to help find the homeworld of the Hive.
19	"Bloodlines"	Perry Lang	Brent V. Friedman & Bryce Zabel	May 31, 1997
June 17, 1967: Dr Carl Sagan discovers a tenth planet in the far reaches of the Solar System that is broadcasting Hive signals. John and Juliet investigate a new drug called "Brown Cubes" that link the user to the Hive which leads John to volunteer for "Project Intruder" which puts him on a Hive mothership in order to rescue his son.

== Home media ==
Following fan campaigns for many years, an announcement was made that Dark Skies would receive a complete series DVD box set release in October 2007 (presumably for Region 1). However, Sony Entertainment subsequently canceled the release, citing prohibitive music licensing costs.

Executive producers Bryce Zabel and Brent Friedman received permission from Sony to find a DVD releasing partner to put the series on the market. However, three independent DVD firms, while initially extremely enthusiastic about doing so, also backed away after discovering the potential costs involved in licensing the period music. Zabel told fans on his blog:

It doesn't mean the idea is dead but it does mean it's not going to be easy. I'm as committed as I've ever been to seeing the series released on DVD so that old fans and new fans can have an excellent quality viewing experience, the way we always intended. Or maybe the conspiracy we wrote about is real and they just don't want the truth to get out...

On January 11, 2009, Zabel reported that "Brent and I aren't ready to say that's the end of it, but it's the end of the beginning. We're probably more disappointed than any fan out there."

Region 2 distribution rights were acquired by Mediumrare, with the full series being released on DVD in the United Kingdom on October 18, 2010.

On the August 9, 2010, episode of Coast to Coast AM, Zabel announced that the series would be released on Region 1 DVD by Shout! Factory on January 20, 2011. The series was successfully released in the US on six DVDs, including a number of special features (an hour-long "making of" documentary, and the never-before-seen pitch for the second season, among others) on the last disc.

The pilot episode was included in the last DVD as an extra.

== CD soundtrack ==
To celebrate the show's tenth anniversary, a limited edition CD soundtrack was released on Perseverance Records in September 2006, featuring selections from the original television score composed by Michael Hoenig and a previously unreleased Pilot Suite arranged by The X-Files composer Mark Snow.

== Awards and nominations ==
Year	Award	Category	Nominee(s)	Result
1997	23rd Saturn Awards	Best Genre Network TV Series	Dark Skies	Nominated
1997	23rd Saturn Awards	Best Genre TV Actor	Eric Close	Nominated
1997	23rd Saturn Awards	Best Genre TV Actress	Megan Ward	Nominated
1997	49th Primetime Emmy Awards	Outstanding Main Title Design	Mike Jones	Won
1997	49th Primetime Emmy Awards	Outstanding Original Main Title Theme Music	Michael Hoenig	Nominated
1997	1st OFTA Television Awards	Best New Theme Song in a Series	Michael Hoenig	Nominated
1998	50th Writers Guild of America Awards	Outstanding Writing for a Long Form – Original	Bryce Zabel and Brent V. Friedman	Nominated

== See also ==
- The Invaders
- The X-Files
