= Woodbridge, California =

Woodbridge
- Census-designated place
- Flag

- Position in California.
- Coordinates: 38°09′57″N 121°18′34″W
- Country: United States
- State: California
- County: San Joaquin

Area
  - Total: 3.121 sq mi (8.083 km^{2})
  - Land: 3.014 sq mi (7.806 km^{2})
  - Water: 0.107 sq mi (0.277 km^{2}) 3.42%
- Elevation: 43 ft (13 m)

Population (2020)
  - Total: 4,031
  - Density: 1,337/sq mi (516.4/km^{2})
- Time zone: UTC-8 (Pacific (PST))
  - Summer (DST): UTC-7 (PDT)
- GNIS feature ID: 2629783

California Historical Landmark
- Reference no.: 358

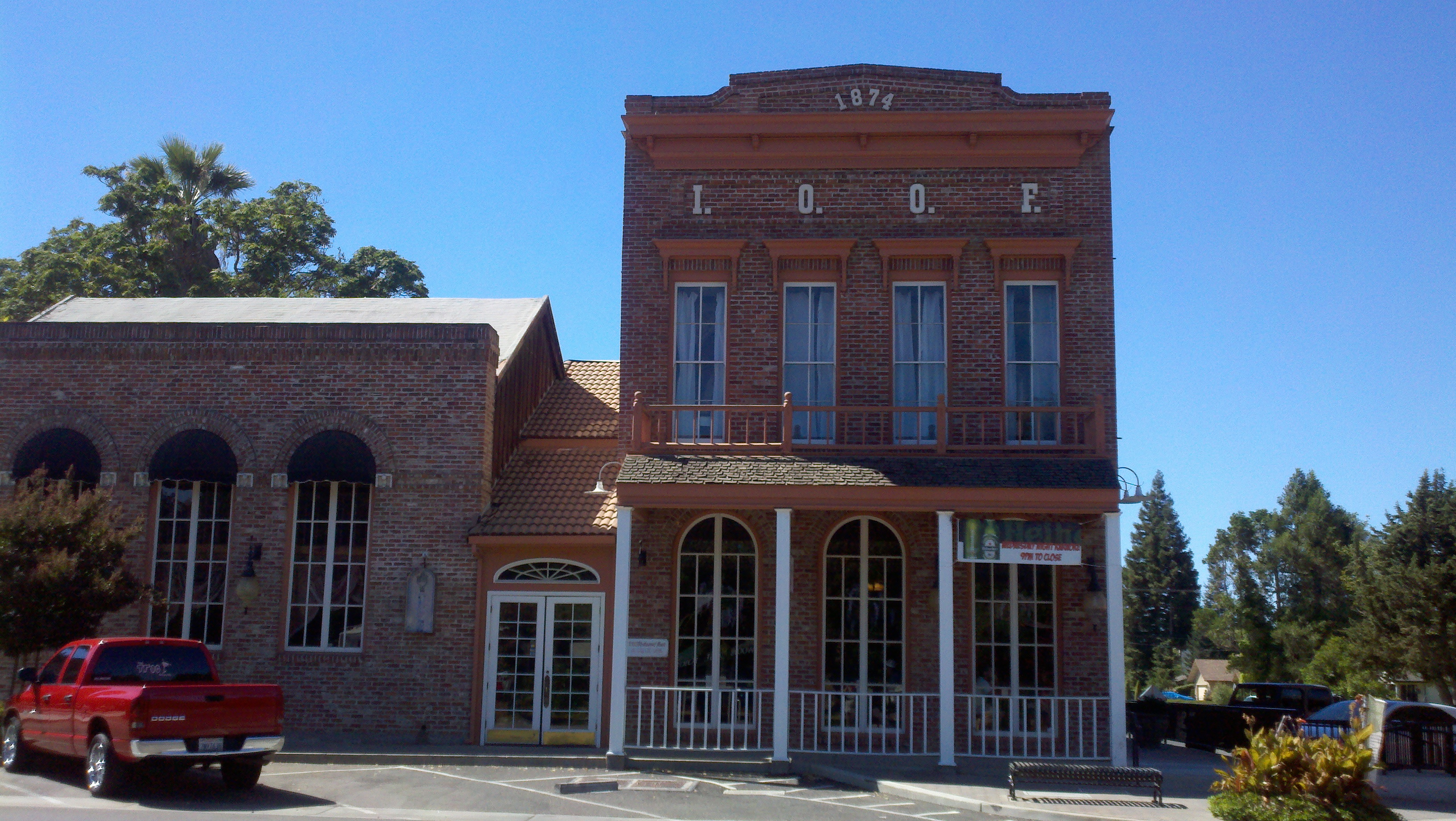
IOOF Hall, Woodbridge California

Woodbridge is a census-designated place in San Joaquin County, California. Woodbridge sits at an elevation of 43 feet (13 m). The 2020 United States census reported Woodbridge's population was 4,031. Founded in the 1850s, the town is listed as a California Historical Landmark.

Woodbridge is located on the northwest side of the city of Lodi, along the banks of the Mokelumne River. Prior to the 2010 census, it was split between the CDPs of North Woodbridge and South Woodbridge and occupies the zip code 95258. It is most known for being in California's San Joaquin Valley winegrowing region.

== History ==
Woodbridge was founded in 1852 by Jeremiah H. Woods and Alexander McQueen, who established a ferry across the Mokelumne River. The ferry enabled a new road to be routed between Stockton and Sacramento. In 1858 they built a wooden bridge at the site of the ferry which became known as Woods' Bridge, from which the community drew its name. Woods hoped that the settlement would grow larger than Stockton, and even hoped to form a separate county, Mokelumne County, with Woodbridge as the seat. In 1867, however, the railroad chose to bypass Woodbridge and lay tracks through neighboring Lodi instead.

Woodbridge then became an educational center, with the Woodbridge Seminary and San Joaquin Valley College both opening doors in 1879. The college closed in 1897 due to declining enrollment.

== Geography ==
According to the United States Census Bureau, the CDP covers an area of 3.1 square miles (8.1 km^{2}), 3.0 square miles (7.8 km^{2}) of which is land, 0.1 square miles (0.3 km^{2}) of it (3.42%) water.

== Demographics ==
Historical population
Census	Pop.	Note	%±
1970	1,397		—
1980	1,672		19.7%
1990	3,456		106.7%
2010	3,984		—
2020	4,031		1.2%
U.S. Decennial Census; 1860–1870 1880-1890; 1900 1910 1920; 1930 1940 1950; 1960 1970 1980; 1990 2000 2010; Note: Woodbridge was not listed in the 2000 census

Woodbridge first appeared as an unincorporated place in the 1970 U.S. census. and as a census designated place in the 1980 U.S. census. It was deleted after being split into the North Woodbridge CDP and South Woodbridge CDP prior to the 2000 U.S. census. It reappeared prior to the 2010 U.S. census, one of ten CDPS (Acampo, Collierville, Dogtown, Mountain House, Peters, Terminous, Thornton, Victor, Waterloo, and Woodbridge) formed out of the deleted North Woodbridge CDP and South Woodbridge CDP.

=== 2020 census ===
As of the 2020 census, Woodbridge had a population of 4,031 and a population density of 1,337.4 inhabitants per square mile (516.4/km^{2}). The median age was 43.8 years. The age distribution was 21.9% under the age of 18, 7.2% aged 18 to 24, 22.6% aged 25 to 44, 26.5% aged 45 to 64, and 21.9% aged 65 or older. For every 100 females, there were 95.2 males, and for every 100 females age 18 and over, there were 97.6 males age 18 and over.

Racial composition as of the 2020 census
Race	Number	Percent
White	2,429	60.3%
Black or African American	59	1.5%
American Indian and Alaska Native	28	0.7%
Asian	222	5.5%
Native Hawaiian and Other Pacific Islander	11	0.3%
Some other race	614	15.2%
Two or more races	668	16.6%
Hispanic or Latino (of any race)	1,290	32.0%

The census reported that 98.3% of the population lived in households, 1.5% lived in non-institutionalized group quarters, and 0.2% were institutionalized. Additionally, 93.3% of residents lived in urban areas and 6.7% lived in rural areas.

There were 1,453 households, of which 27.9% had children under the age of 18 living in them. Of all households, 59.6% were married-couple households, 6.1% were cohabiting couple households, 14.0% had a male householder with no spouse or partner present, and 20.2% had a female householder with no spouse or partner present. About 19.4% of all households were made up of individuals, and 12.5% had someone living alone who was 65 years of age or older. The average household size was 2.73. There were 1,086 families (74.7% of all households).

There were 1,518 housing units, of which 4.3% were vacant. The homeowner vacancy rate was 1.2% and the rental vacancy rate was 2.8%. Of occupied housing units, 76.5% were owner-occupied and 23.5% were occupied by renters.

=== Income and poverty ===
In 2023, the US Census Bureau estimated that the median household income was $100,682, and the per capita income was $50,806. About 3.8% of families and 6.5% of the population were below the poverty line.

== Notable people ==
- Ross Thomas (born 1981), actor and filmmaker, was raised in both Stockton, California and Woodbridge.
