= Daddy's Boy (disambiguation) =

Daddy's Boy is a 1989 book by Chris Elliott.

Daddy's Boy may also refer to:

- "Daddy's Boy" (House), a television episode
- Daddy's Boy, a 1909 children's book by L. T. Meade
- Daddy's Boy, an LGBT-themed film featured in The Click List: Best in Short Film
- "Daddy's Boy", a song by Killdozer from their 1995 album God Hears Pleas of the Innocent
- "Daddy's Boy", a fictional musical featured in the Netflix series Unbreakable Kimmy Schmidt
