= Stefanelli =

Stefanelli is a surname of Italian origin. The name refers to:

- Benito Stefanelli (1929–1999), Italian film actor and stuntman
- Joe Stefanelli (painter) (1921–2017), American painter
- Joe Stefanelli (b. 1960), American actor and musician
- Mattia Stefanelli (b. 1993), Sammarinese footballer
- Nicholas Stefanelli, US chef and restaurant owner
- Nicolás Stefanelli (b. 1994), Argentine footballer
- Pietro Stefanelli (1835–1919), Italian entomologist
- Simonetta Stefanelli (b. 1954), Italian actress

Also:

- Teodor V. Ștefanelli (1849–1920), Romanian historian
