= Wood's Bridge =

Historical place in San Joaquin County, United States

Wood's Ferry and Wood's Bridge Site
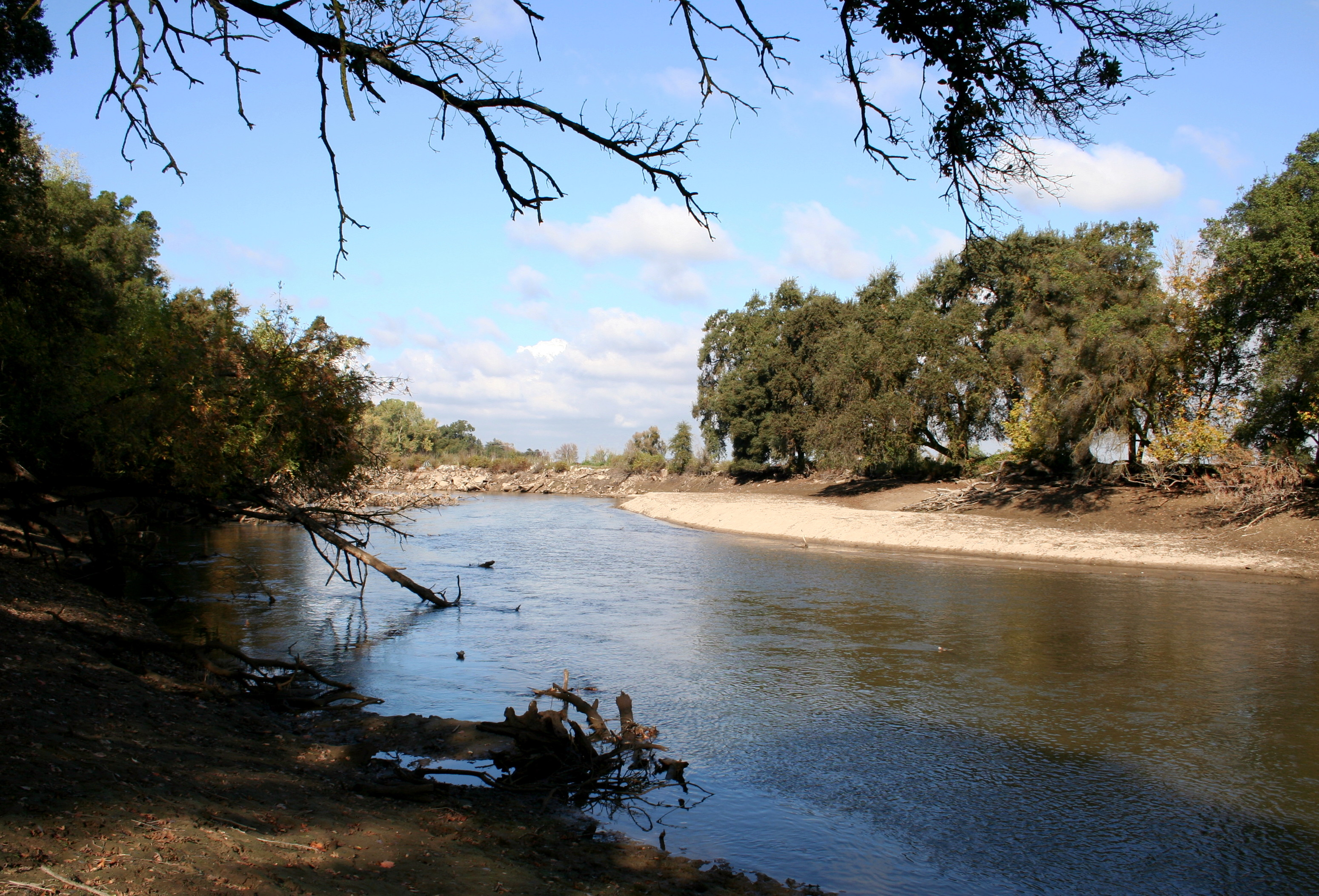
- Mokelumne River near Wood's Ferry

- Location within California Location within the United States
- 38.157°N 121.297°W
- Location: 19032 Lower Sacramento Road now bridge on J10; Woodbridge, California

History
- Built: 1852

California Historical Landmark
- Designated: Jan. 11. 1935
- Reference no.: 163

Wood's Ferry and Wood's Bridge Site is a historical site in Woodbridge, California in San Joaquin County. Wood's Ferry and Wood's Bridge site is a California Historical Landmark No. 163, listed on Jan. 11. 1935. The Wood's Ferry was built by pioneer Jeremiah H. Woods, 1852, shortly after Woods arrived at Woodbridge and built his log cabin house. The cable ferry crossed the Mokelumne River at Wood's Ferry. Wood built a toll bridge at the site of his ferry in August 1858 at a cost of $1,000 (about $37,000 in today's money). To cross the wooden bridge, Woods charged $1 (about $37 in today's money) for two animals pulling a wagon and $0.50 for any extra wagons the group may have. The toll took in $9,900 (about $366,000 in today's money) this first year. There is no marker at the site, there is modern bridge at the site on J10 at 19032 Lower Sacramento Road.

Jeremiah H. Woods and Alexander McQueen purchased land for Wood's Ferry from the Sargent brothers, J. P. Sargent and Roscoe S. Sargent, in 1852. The Sargent brothers grew barley crops on the surrounding land. Jeremiah H. Woods built the wooden cable ferry by hand at the river bank from local trees. In October 1852 John A. J. Flood and E. H. Comstock petitioned the Court of Sessions have a public road built from Stockton, and have it cross at Wood's ferry then on to Davis' bridge and on Dry creek (Fugett's). The court order designated the route as a county road, that helped Woods. In 1853 a flood washed out the road, so Woods organized a pack train and took Stockton supplies to miners that were unable to get the normal supply by wagon trains. Woods had to use row boats to cross the river with the goods. Later to boost travel, Woods gave the stagecoach free ferry crossing. The town at the ferry became known as Wood's Ferry, and in 1859 became Woodbridge, named after Woods' bridge. On July 4, 1855, Woods used his new wealth to put on an expensive Independence Day dance for the town and travelers. In 1874 a free public bridge was built and the old toll-bridge was removed. Woods was paid $1,000 by the new bridge builders.

== See also ==
- California Historical Landmarks in San Joaquin County
