= Lift Trucks Project =

Art gallery in Croton Falls, New York

- Established: 2010
- Location: Croton Falls, New York
- Directors: Scott Everett, Pamela Hart, Tom Christopher
- Website: ltproject.com

Lift Trucks Project is a project space and artist studio located in Croton Falls, New York. It features up to four long-term exhibitions per year with notable pieces by FA-Q, Christo, Ottmar Hoerl, Ed Roth ("Big Daddy"), A. R. Penck, Sailor Jerry, and others. In addition, Lift Trucks features a permanent "Arts and Industry" exhibit with industrial artifacts and folk art items on exhibit. The name Lift Trucks is derived from the former occupants a forklift repair, sales and service business that occupied the building for over 75 years.

== Exhibits ==
=== "Christian Lemesle Exhibit" ===
Christian Lemesle's works were discovered recently after 60 years in storage.

Some pieces bear the Rue du Dragon gallery label, while others trace their provenance to David Findlay Gallery, West 57th New York City. This collection of 18 pieces provide a glimpse into the Surrealists of Paris.

The area where the Galerie du Dragon was located was the center of literary activities. Its “significance” is further accentuated by its association with the La Librairie du Temps (BookStore of Time), as depicted in a Lemesle work that features a large clock.

Noteworthy events include an exhibition resulting from the collaboration between critic Jean Paulhan and artist Jean Dubuffet, marked by an invitation dated February 4, 1950, featuring a drawing by Dubuffet.

=== "From a Factory Floor" ===
Lift Trucks Project held its inaugural exhibition on June 7, 2009, entitled "From a Factory Floor". This featured a collaboration between Master Printmaker Gary Lichtenstein and 14 artists including Alex Katz, Gary Panter, Karl Benjamin, Ken Price, Jack Micheline, and others. Curated by Lichtenstein, it features his collaborative Silkscreen renderings of these artists' works. The second exhibition of "From a Factory Floor" took place on August 20, 2009.

=== "Stefanelli-Hammerstein" ===
The second exhibition took place on October 10, 2009, and was entitled "Stefanelli-Hammerstein". It was on display until November 24, 2009.[6] It featured a collaboration of drawings and paintings from notable artists Andy Hammerstein and Joe Stefanelli. Mr Stefanelli is one of the last remaining AbEx painters from the famous group formed in the 1950s.

=== "Wonders of Westchester" ===
This exhibit took place on January 16, 2010, and was sponsored by The Westchester Land Trust. It was the 8th annual photography show featuring over 160 photographs and 70 photographers. The exhibit was based on photographs of Westchester County, New York and was judged by photographer J. Henry Fair

=== "Ekfrasis: An exchange between artists and writers" ===
Lift Truck Projects' fourth exhibit opened on January 30, 2010. It was curated by Pamela J. Hart, the writer in residence from the Katonah Museum of Art and featured collaborations among artists and writers. In the exhibit "Each work in the show is paired with a text, sometimes old, sometimes commissioned especially for the exhibition and published in the catalog." Notable artists included Saul Steinberg, A. R. Penck, Picasso, Rockwell Kent, LeRoy Neiman, along with notable writers such as James Balestrieri, Marilyn Johnson and Ben Cheever.

=== "Cause & Affection" ===
This exhibit opened on June 12, 2010, and was curated by Kara Lenkeit. It was reviewed by The New York Times. It featured conceptual pairings of art by Scott Daniel Ellison, Nick Greenwald, Scott Goodman, Big Daddy Roth, Ellen Guhin, Christopher Manning, Mark Nilsson, Gil Riley, and Milton Stevenson, and others.

=== "The Unknowing Hand: A Story of Autism and Artistry" ===
This exhibit opened on September 25, 2010. It featured a collaboration of artists Darren Murray and John Michaels. Michaels was a special-ed. art teacher for Murray, who has non-verbal ASD. When teaching Murray, Michaels discovered that he would often imitate the teacher's drawings that were very similar to the original. The art features John Michaels' drawings and Murray's imitations of them. Proceeds of the exhibit went to a local special education school.

=== "The Art of John Michaels and Darren Murray" ===
This exhibit opened on February 4, 2010. It featured a similar collaboration as "The Unknowing Hand: A Story of Autism and Artistry" exhibit. It was reviewed by The Journal News.

=== "FLASH: Tattoo Art as Symbol and Sign" ===
This Lift Trucks exhibit had its opening on September 24, 2011. It was curated by Pamela Hart, and features tattoo flash art from over 25 artists, including notables such as Sailor Jerry, Brooklyn Joe Lieber, and Paul Rogers.

=== "Body Electric" ===
A collaborative exhibit opened September 18, 2014 at Ricco Maresca Gallery in Chelsea, New York. Included were pieces from Lift Trucks Project including artist works of Sailor Jerry, Cap Coleman, Bert Grimm, as well as various contemporary artists. The show was curated by author Margot Mifflin, and was reviewed by Inked (magazine) and The New York Observer.

=== "Of Pirates Mermaids and True Love" ===
A collaborative exhibit opened September 24, 2016 at the Hammond Museum in North Salem, NY. It was a comprehensive show featuring the Lift Trucks Project tattoo collection. It was reviewed in the Bedford and Pound Ridge Record Review.

=== "Tattooed New York" ===
A collaborative exhibit opened February 3, 2017 at the New York Historical Society Museum, in New York City, NY. It showcased tattoo artists working in New York City over the last century and featured drawings from the Lift Trucks Project collection. It was featured in The New Yorker, Smithsonian Magazine, The New York Post and The Huffington Post.

=== "Drive By Gallery" ===
Lift Trucks Project recently started a project named The Drive By Gallery, to reach a wider audience primarily the car traffic constantly going by the gallery. It presents a new and uniquely American form of viewing art. Artworks are often rotated and always with documentation pertaining to the particular show can be seen on the website. In a bow to modern technology, Lift Trucks incorporated QR codes and a live video feed. Exhibited artworks have consisted hand painted Great Depression era shoeshine boxes, industrial artifacts, vintage tattoo flash, art by Erica Hauser, Carl Van Brunt, Chris Machin, Richard Osaka, and other exhibits currently in development.

== Current ==
=== "Art and Industry" ===
A curated selection of industrial and vintage artifacts reflecting great design and art. It was featured on an episode of the show American Pickers.
