= Lammersville Unified School District =

School district in California

Address
- 111 South De Anza Boulevard Mountain House, California; United States

District information
- Type: Unified school district
- Grades: K–12
- Schools: 9
- NCES District ID: 0601410

Students and staff
- Students: 7,949
- Teachers: 334.68 FTE
- Student–teacher ratio: 23.75:1

Other information
- Website: www.lammersvilleschooldistrict.net

Lammersville Unified School district (LUSD) (formerly known as Lammersville Elementary School District) is a pre-kindergarten through twelfth grade unified school district in Mountain House, California, which serves the area west of Tracy and parts of Alameda County. The district was created when majority of voters in the Lammersville and Mountain House area passed a measure to separate from Tracy Unified School District in a special election on June 8, 2010. It became an independent school district on July 1, 2011.

== District office ==
The district opened a 7,000-square-foot (650.32 m²) new district office on 111 S. DeAnza Blvd.

== History ==
Lammersville Elementary School District started out as one-school school district and was established in 1876. Its biggest growth started in 2005 when the Mountain House community was established. Lammersville Joint Unified School District has plans for 12 K-8 schools and one comprehensive high school, with up to 10,000 total students. The district currently serves 7,570 students in the eight K-8 schools (Altamont, Bethany, Cordes, Costa, Hansen, Lammersville, Questa and Wicklund) and Mountain House High School.

== Schools ==
- Altamont Elementary School, Mountain House
- Bethany Elementary School, Mountain House
- Julius Cordes Elementary School, Mountain House
- Evelyn Costa Elementary School, Mountain House
- Lammersville Elementary School, Tracy
- Mountain House High School, Mountain House
- Peter Hansen Elementary School, Mountain House
- Sebastian Questa Elementary School, Mountain House
- Wicklund Elementary School, Mountain House

== Website ==
- Lammersville School District
