= What's Bugging Seth =

- Directed by: Eli Steele
- Starring: Ross Thomas; Amy Purdy; Nora Kirkpatrick
- Edited by: Joyce Brand
- Release date: 2005
- Country: United States
- Language: English

What's Bugging Seth is a 2005 drama film directed by Eli Steele and starring Ross Thomas, Amy Purdy, and Nora Kirkpatrick. The screenplay concerns a young deaf man striving for success in his own business. It found success on the film festival circuit and was released on DVD in the beginning of 2008.

== Synopsis ==
Seth Singer, a young deaf man, believes in one thing: that he is no different from anyone else. Determined to prove his point, he throws his life savings into a pesticide business despite the presence of a well-established competitor. Along the way, Seth meets Alma, a double amputee, and they find romance as they bond over their disabilities. However, their relationship is threatened by the return of Nora, Seth’s high school girlfriend, who comes home after a disappointing modeling career.

== Cast ==
- Ross Thomas
- Amy Purdy
- Nora Kirkpatrick

== Awards ==
- Winner, Fargo Film Festival
- Winner, San Fernando Valley International Film Festival
- Winner, Santa Cruz Film Festival
- Winner, Ft. Lauderdale Film Festival
- Winner, Empire Film Festival
- Winner, Real to Reel Film Festival
- Winner, DancesWithFilms Film Festival

== DVD ==
What's Bugging Seth is available on DVD at www.whatsbuggingseth.com
