= Mountain House Creek =

Stream in Alameda and San Joaquin Counties, California

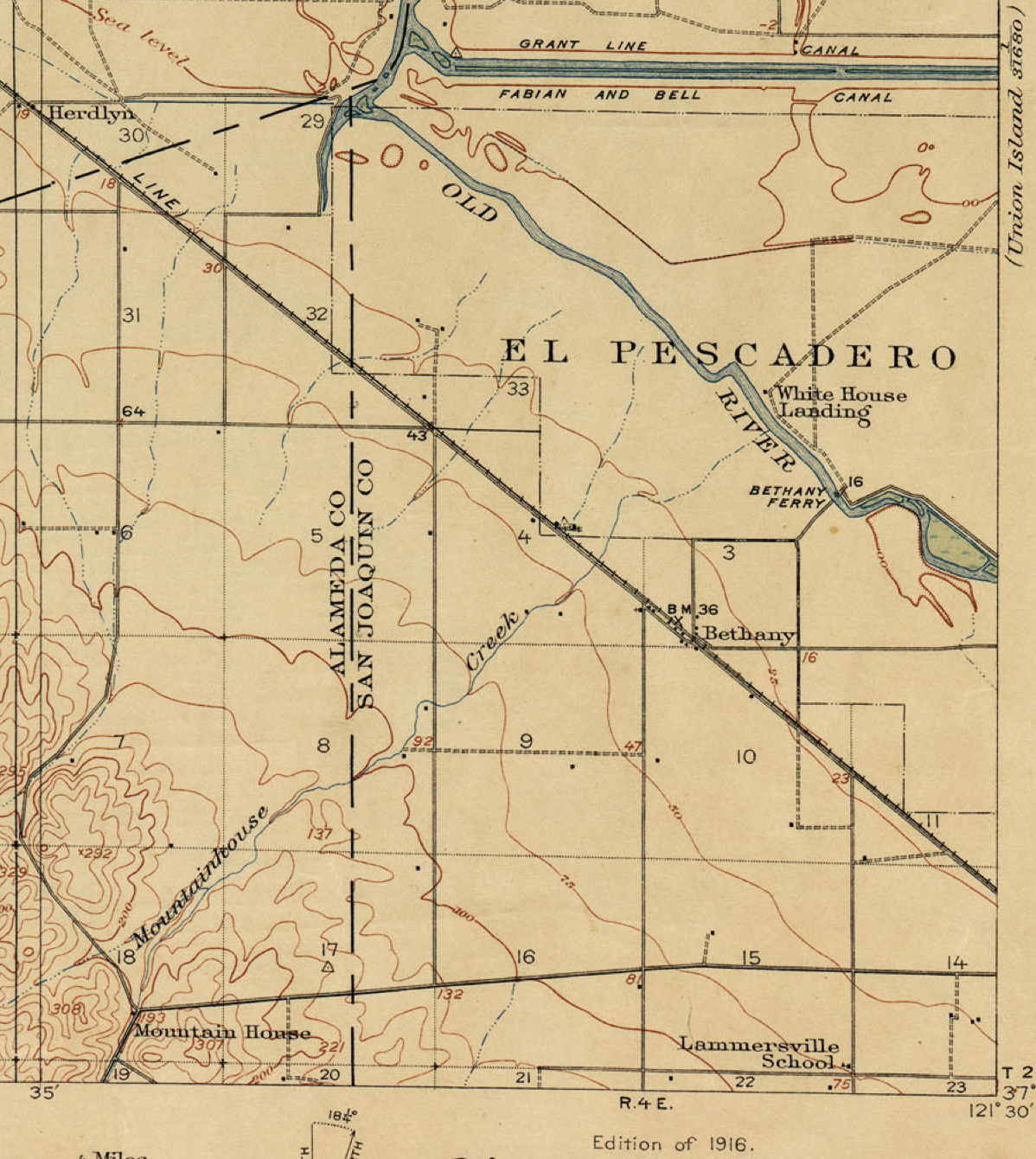
- USGS Topographic Map of Mountainhouse Creek in 1916

- Location of the mouth of Mountain House Creek in California

Location
- Country: United States
- State: California
- Region: Alameda and San Joaquin Counties
- Cities: Mountain House

Physical characteristics
- Source
  - location: 6.4 mi (10 km) east/northeast of Livermore, California
  - coordinates: 37°42′45.8″N 121°39′03.4″W
  - elevation: 1,080 ft (330 m)
- Mouth: Old River
  - location: 1.5 mi (2 km) northeast of Mountain House, California
  - coordinates: 37°47′52.7″N 121°31′30.8″W
  - elevation: 7 ft (2.1 m)
- Basin size: 17 sq mi (44 km^{2})

Mountain House Creek is a 11.3-mile-long (18.2 km) east/northeast-flowing intermittent stream draining the eastern Diablo Range in Alameda and San Joaquin Counties, California. The creek bisects the community of Mountain House and continues northeast to join the Old River, which was the original course of the San Joaquin River in the San Joaquin Valley of California.

== History ==
Mountain House Creek is named for the historical waystop Mountain House used by travelers from San Francisco to the gold fields of the Sierra Nevada.

== Watershed ==
Mountain House Creek has a 17 square miles (44 km^{2}) watershed draining the eastern side of the Diablo Range watershed divide. The creek originates south and east of Altamont Pass at 1,080 feet (330 m) elevation along Flynn Road North. The creek flows immediately north and then briefly under the bifurcated east-bound section of Interstate 580 (I-580), then follows east by northeast along the south side of I-580 until it crosses again, this time south to north under both of the I-580 bifurcated road section at about 457 feet (139 m) elevation and 0.9 miles (1.4 km) west of Jess Ranch Road (aka West Grant Line Road on the north side of I-580). Next, Mountain House Creek flows along West Grant Line Road over the California Aqueduct to the intersection with Mountain House Road at the historic Alameda County Mountain House. The creek continues northeasterly across the Delta–Mendota Canal then through the residential communities of Mountain House before going on to empty into the Old River, a distributary of the San Joaquin River. Although Mountain House Creek's flows are ephemeral/seasonal, the lower 3.5 miles (5.6 km) of the creek are dominated by agricultural return flows.

== Ecology ==
Of interest a post office called Elk Horn was established from 1852 to 1853 near today's Mountain House, California, and consisted of a home, store, stagestop and hotel decorated with the horns of tule elk (Cervus canadensis nannodes), likely reflecting the historical presence of elk in the vicinity. Tule elk are present today in the upper reaches of Mountain House Creek south of I-580, dispersers from circa 1980 translocations to the Hewlett-Packard San Felipe Ranch on Mount Hamilton. However, the elk are boxed in from further range expansion by I-580 to the north and east.

California species of special concern listed amphibians utilize cattle ponds on the creek upstream from the community of Mountain House including California red-legged frog (Rana draytonii) and California tiger salamander (Ambystoma californiense) Central California Distinct Population Segment (DPS).

North American beaver (Castor canadensis) are established on Mountain House Creek, upstream at least through the community of Mountain House.

== Recreation ==
The Mountain House Creek trail and greenway was established through the planned community of Mountain House. It consists of two trails, one paved and one unpaved, on either side of the creek for 1.0 mile (1.6 km) length.
