= Ross Thomas (actor) =

American actor (born 1981)

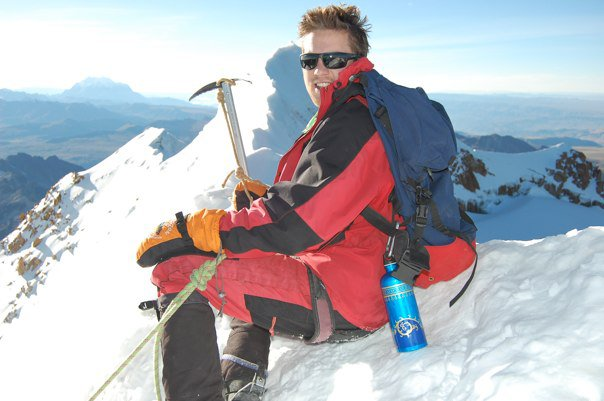
- Born: August 21, 1981 (age 45); Stockton, California, US
- Years active: 2002–present
- Spouse: Jolene Rust-Thomas (m. 2015)
- Children: 2

Ross Thomas (born August 21, 1981) is an American actor, filmmaker, philanthropist and adventurer.

== Early life ==
Ross Thomas was born in Stockton, California and raised in both Stockton and Woodbridge, California. His mother Catherine Schuler is a computer science professor and author, and his father, Randy Thomas, is a trial attorney, poet and adventurer. He has three sisters and one brother. He attended St. Mary's High School and subsequently attended Arizona State University and The University of Southern California. He played left wing for the Arizona State University rugby team. He studied anthropology, broadcasting and theatre arts. He graduated from The University of Southern California in the winter of 2004.

In 2005, Thomas played the title role in What's Bugging Seth as a deaf man determined to find love and career success despite his handicap. The film won awards at the DancesWithFilms Festival, the Santa Cruz Film Festival, and the Empire Film Festival.

Other film credits include starring roles in films such as The Cutting Edge 2: Going for the Gold, American Pie: The Naked Mile, the Wayans’ Brothers comedy Dance Flick, in which he spoofed Channing Tatum's character in Step Up, Burning Palms, and the indie flick Shelter, which went on to win the GLAAD Outstanding Film Award in 2009.

On the small screen, Thomas was a series regular on the Nickelodeon original teen series Beyond the Break. Thomas played Bailey, a stellar surfer who had a reputation for being a playboy. The show aired from 2006 to 2009. He also had a recurring role on General Hospital as Brandon, a hardened criminal just released from jail. Thomas has also appeared on NCIS Lie to Me CSI: Crime Scene Investigation, CSI: NY, Cold Case, and Living with Fran.

Thomas had a starring role in the film Soul Surfer, based on the true story of shark attack survivor Bethany Hamilton. Thomas played Bethany's older brother, Noah. He is also the passenger in the Cadillac ATS television commercials. In 2012, Ross was selected amid fierce competition to host the Cadillac ATS vs. The World campaign, one of the largest productions in the history of General Motors. Cadillac ATS vs. The World was created to break the mold of automotive advertising to connect with a new generation of customers. Set in four countries around the world, the campaign consists of spectacular demonstrations of the nimble, quick and fun driving dynamics of the Cadillac ATS. In addition to the commercials, Ross hosted 20 mini-documentaries centered around the car, the task of filming the campaign and various cultural segues. Directed by racing legend Jeff Zwart and award-winning documentary filmmaker, Joe Berlinger, Ross and his crew embarked on a rugged adventure that bridged continents in search of some of the most technically challenging segments of road around. Highlighted locations include Patagonia, Monaco, Morocco and China. Ross had once in a lifetime interviews with the last native speaker of the Yaghan language in Puerto Williams to members of the Shao Lin Kung Fu academy in China.

In 2013, Ross was chosen to host and produce the new CBS Sports Docu-Series, Game Changers. The show celebrates athletes and fans who reach out in their communities to make life better for so many. Game Changers, also featuring omg! Insider's Kevin Frazier, highlights professional athletes who use their public image to make positive changes in the lives of fans in need. Whether on or off the field, Game Changers takes an inspirational look at how sports positively impacts individuals and the communities they serve. Ross also guest starred opposite Ramon Rodriguez, Terry O'Quinn and RZA in the pilot episode of the 2013 FOX TV show, Gang Related, directed by renowned film director, Allen Hughes and produced by Brian Grazer and Imagine Entertainment. Ross plays rookie LAPD officer, James Tanner.

On June 6, 2020 Ross Thomas won an Emmy® Award in the category "Talent-Program Host/Moderator/Reporter" for his work as a co-host on NBC's California Live.

== Personal life ==
Thomas is an extreme sports enthusiast and avid adventure traveller. He recently summited Huayna Potossi in Bolivia at 19,974 ft. He surfs and snowboards and performed many of his own stunts for his role as an extreme sports professional turned figure skater in ABC Family channel movie The Cutting Edge: Going for the Gold.

Ross is a supporter of tribal peoples' rights. He has made a short documentary film about the plight of the Harakmbut tribe in the Madre De Dios region of Peru, and has visited Brazil to support the tribes against the Belo Monte Dam. Ross has worked with indigenous rights organizations Survival International and Amazon Watch. In 2010, Ross spent months in the Southern Peruvian Amazon shooting and producing the documentary Extraction: The Plundering of the Amarakaeri Reserve. He also spent time with the Secoya tribe along the Shushufindi and Aguarico River in the Ecuadorian Amazon. He is interested in anthropology, ethnobotany and alternative medicine.

On August 29, 2015, Thomas married Jolene Rust. They have two sons.

== Filmography ==
| Year | Title | Role | Notes |
|---|---|---|---|
| 2005 | Cold Case | Pete | TV |
| 2005 | Living with Fran | Kurt | TV |
| 2005 | CSI: Crime Scene Investigation | Trip Wilmont | TV |
| 2005 | Sissy Frenchfry | Bodey McDodey | Film |
| 2005 | CSI: NY | Sam | TV |
| 2006 | Lipshitz Saves the World | Mark Sherman | TV |
| 2006 | American Pie Presents: The Naked Mile | Ryan Grimm | Film |
| 2006 | Beyond the Break | Bailey Reese | TV |
| 2006 | The Cutting Edge: Going for the Gold | Alex Harrison | Film |
| 2007 | Shelter | Gabe | Film |
| 2009 | Dance Flick | Tyler | Film |
| 2009 | Lie to Me | Doug Donovan | TV |
| 2009 | The Haunting of Molly Hartley | Jock | Film |
| 2010 | Burning Palms | Lukas | Film |
| 2011 | Pop Star | Eddie Marz | Film |
| 2011 | Soul Surfer | Noah Hamilton | Film |
| 2011 | NCIS | Coast Guard Petty Officer Third Class Kyle Sterling | TV |
| 2011 | General Hospital | Brandon Lowell | TV |
| 2012 | Kingdom Hearts 3D: Dream Drop Distance | Sam Flynn | Video game |
| 2014 | Gang Related | James Tanner | TV |
| 2015 | Disney Infinity 3.0 | Sam Flynn | Video game |
| 2025 | Disney Speedstorm | Sam Flynn | Video game |
