= Mountain House High School =

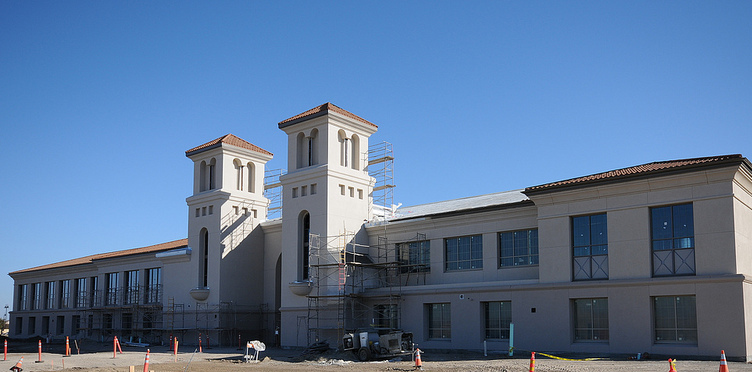

Location
- 1090 S. Central Parkway; Mountain House, California 95391; United States
- Coordinates: 37°45′53.46″N 121°32′46.24″W

Information
- Type: Public
- Established: 2014
- School district: Lammersville Unified School District
- Principal: Adam Auerbach
- Staff: 65.15 (FTE)
- Grades: 9-12
- Enrollment: ~2200 (2023-2024)
- Student to teacher ratio: 20.69
- Campus: suburban
- Campus size: 40 acres (160,000 m^{2})
- Colors: Blue & Silver
- Mascot: Mustang
- Website: http://mhhs.lammersvilleschooldistrict.net

Mountain House High School is a four-year, public high school located in the city of Mountain House. On July 17, 2012, Lammersville Unified School District broke ground on construction. The school opened in the Fall of 2014. It celebrated its 10 Year Anniversary in 2024.

== Academics ==
Mountain House High School offers Honors and Advanced Placement (AP) courses and professional pathways in Biomedical Sciences, Business, Computer Science, Engineering, Culinary and Catering, and Dance. It also offers several sports teams and extracurricular clubs. The principal is Adam Auerbach.

=== Sports ===
- Basketball
- Soccer
- Cross Country
- Football (co-ed)
- Flag Football (co-ed)
- Volleyball
- Softball
- Baseball
- Swim
- Track and Field
- Water Polo
- Golf
- Wrestling
- Tennis
