= Mountain House, Alameda County, California =

Unincorporated community in California, United States

Mountain House
- Locality
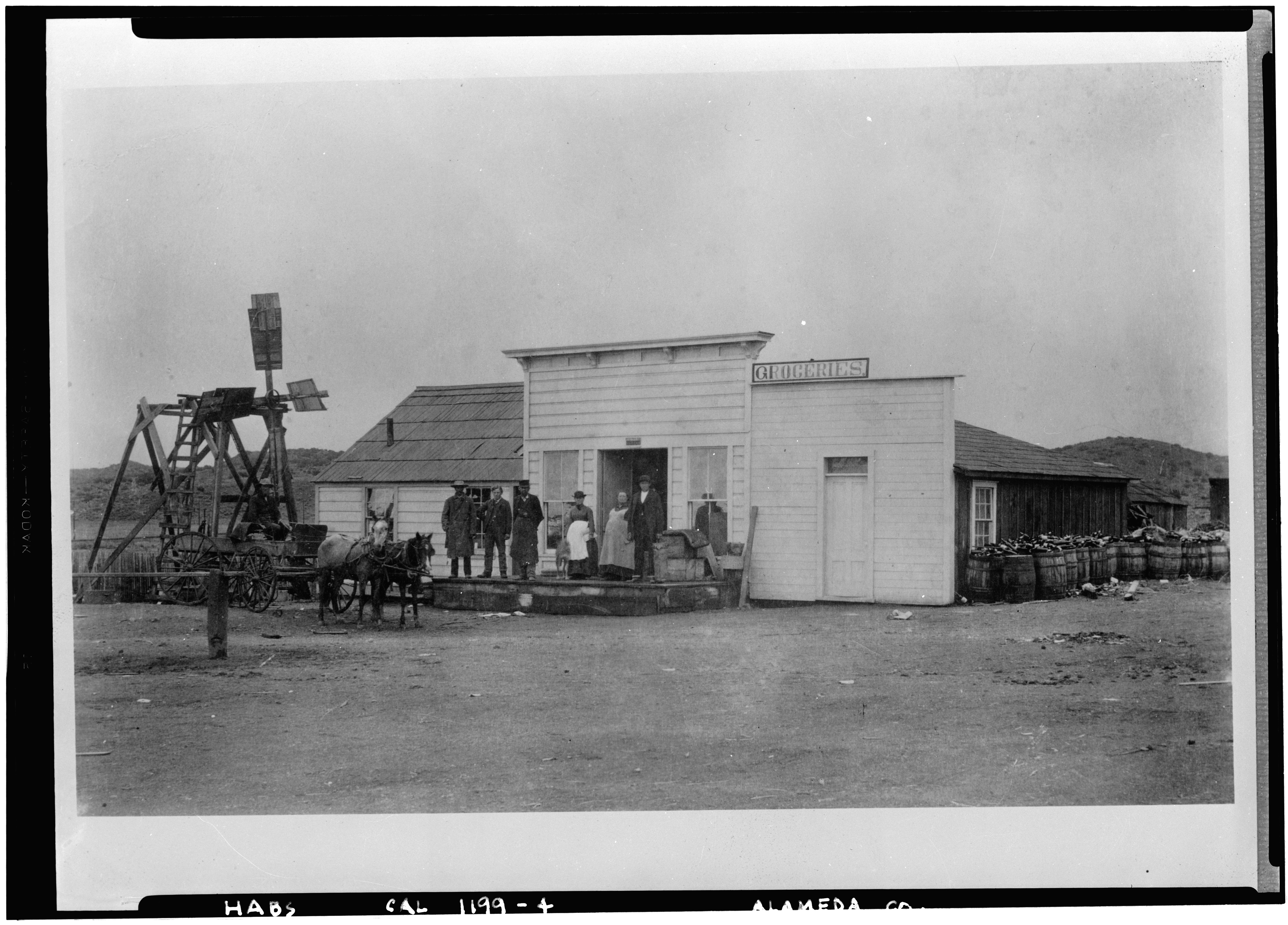
- Mountain House c.1925

- Location in California Mountain House (the United States)
- Coordinates: 37°45′15″N 121°34′32″W
- Country: United States
- State: California
- County: Alameda County
- Elevation: 207 ft (63 m)

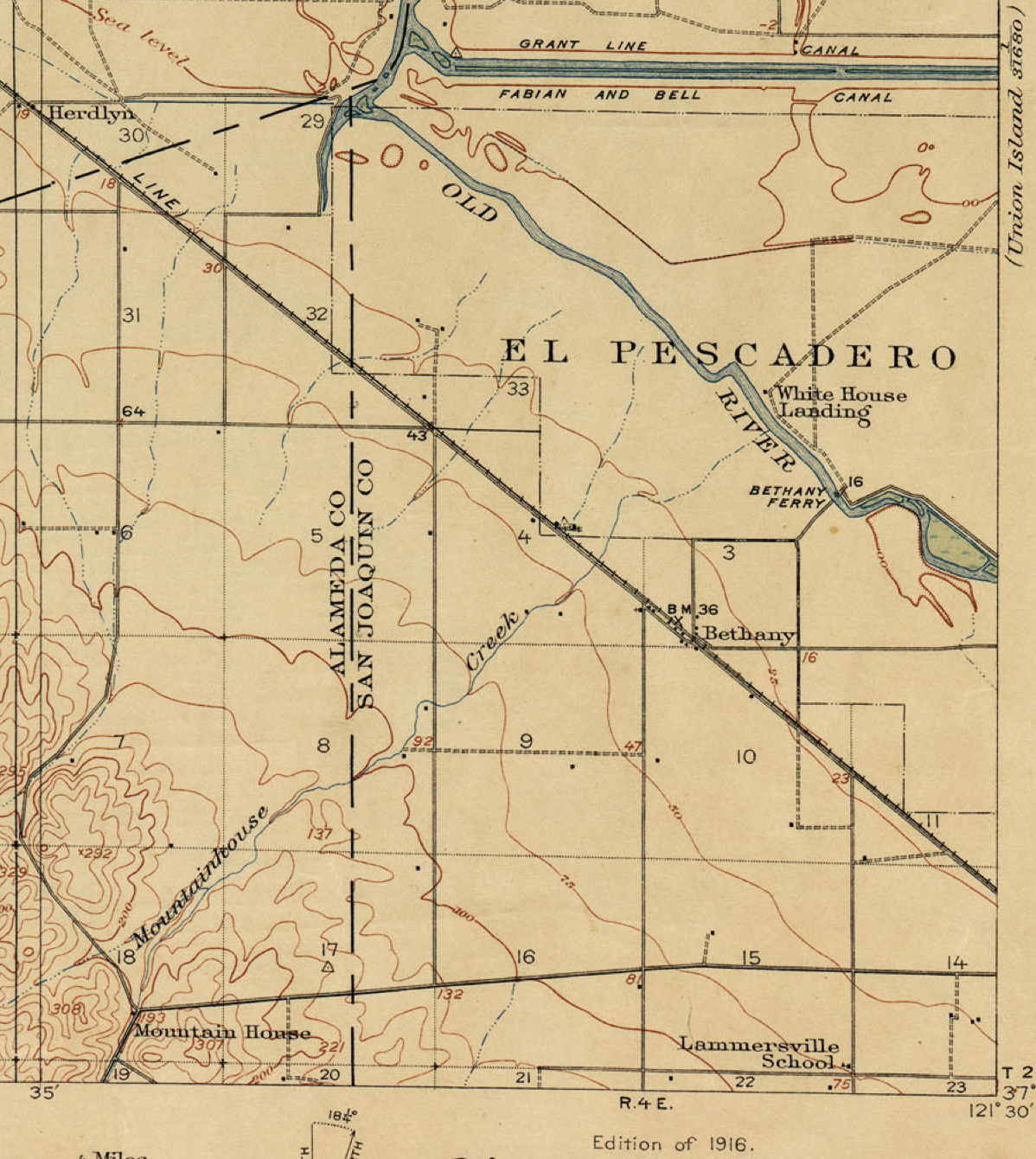
Southeast portion of the U.S. Geological Survey 1916 Topographical Map of the Byron Quadrangle, California, showing the historic Mountain Home on Mountain House Creek.

Mountain House (formerly, Zimmerman's and Zimmerman's Mountain House) was a historic waystop for forty-niners halfway from San Francisco to the Sierra Nevada gold country. The unincorporated community is in Alameda County, California, United States. It is located 12 miles (19 km) east-northeast of Livermore, and 6 miles (9.7 km) east of the Altamont Pass, historically the Livermore Pass, at an altitude of 207 feet (63 m), between the California Aqueduct and the Delta-Mendota Canal. San Joaquin County's Mountain House borrowed the name of the historic Mountain House and is located two miles (3 km) to the northeast further downstream on Mountain House Creek.

== History ==
The Cholbon triblet of the Northern Valley Yokuts were the original inhabitants of the Mountain House area. Their territory ran along Old River a distributary of the San Joaquin River.

In 1849 Thomas Goodall erected a blue denim cloth tent to serve as a midway stopover for gold miners headed from San Francisco to the Sierra Nevada (U.S.) foothills via Altamont Pass. Goodall eventually built an adobe house at the eastern edge of the Diablo Range hills, calling it The Mountain House. Simon Zimmerman later acquired the stop and it became known as Zimmerman's Mountain House, and became a well-known way station stop on the way to Stockton. The last remaining settlement buildings were leveled in 1940. In November 1994, the San Joaquin County Board of Supervisors officially launched the new community of Mountain House two miles to the northwest along Mountain House Creek.

The Elk Horn post office, which operated from 1852 to 1853, was located at or near Mountain House.

In 1915 the county road, passing in front of Mountain House, became the Lincoln Highway, America's first to-coast paved road.

The Mountain House Bar now occupies the site of the original Mountain House, and is located at 16784 West Grantline Road.
