= Sissy Frenchfry =

- Promotional poster
- Directed by: JC Oliva
- Written by: Joe Brouillette
- Starring: Steven Mayhew; Ross Thomas; Leslie Jordan
- Distributed by: Wolfe Releasing
- Release date: 2005
- Running time: 28 minutes
- Country: United States
- Language: English

Sissy Frenchfry is a 2005 LGBTQ+ short film directed by J.C. Oliva and starring Steven Mayhew, Ross Thomas, and Leslie Jordan. It is a high school political fable that explores what happens when personal freedoms are sacrificed to promote a culture focused on winning games, financial success, and power.

== Plot ==
Welcome to wildly eclectic and diverse West Beach High, where the annual student body president election will pit the quirky, much-beloved incumbent Sissy Frenchfry against a handsome, charismatic – and socially intolerant – transfer student with a devious plan to restore the status quo.

Sissy Frenchfry is the most popular student at West Beach High. He's got bleached blond hair with pink tips, earrings, and a decidedly unique fashion sense. The eternally good-natured Sissy is student body president, a member of every club on campus, and head of the yearbook and newspaper. Sissy IS the big man on campus, until one day...

A transfer student named Bodey McDodey arrives at West Beach. Bodey is the quintessential All-American jock: handsome, arrogant, charming, and accomplished. He's ready to assume command as Alpha male in what should be a familiar high school setting; however, he's astounded at what he finds at West Beach. QB & Ross, the school's quarterback and linebacker, are boyfriends and openly affectionate; the talented yet plump Georgia Peach holds the head cheerleader position despite not being a size 2; and the school's student videographer and Sissy's best friend, Dana Aquino, is a goth transgender student. “What is wrong with this school?” Bodey asks himself. The worst of all is the fact that Sissy Frenchfry, someone Bodey considers a loser and a nuisance, holds the position of ultimate authority and respect in the school: Student Body President. Bodey sets his sights on the presidency, aiming to change West Beach forever.

What follows is Bodey bribing, seducing, and manipulating his way into a position of popularity and power. Sissy must choose between his integrity, his duty to maintain the peace of the school, and his own desire to win the election.

Will Sissy win back the school?

== Awards ==
- Grand Prize Jury Award - PlanetOut Short Movie Awards
- Audience Award - PlanetOut Short Movie Awards
- Audience Award, Best Male Short - Long Island Gay and Lesbian Film Festival
- Audience Award, Best Short - Barcelona Gay and Lesbian International Film Festival

== Reception ==
CinemaQueer said, "This is classic Revenge Of The Nerds and, for the most part, Sissy Frenchfry manages to be both funny and touching. The ending is a little preachy, and a bit too much like an Afterschool Special, but it gets its point across without overdoing it as McDodey gets his comeuppance."
