= The Click List: Best in Short Film =

Series of online short films

The Click List: Best in Short Film is an anthology series of recent LGBT-themed short film programming on Logo. The series premiered on the channel on March 2, 2006.

Each episode is one hour in length and comprises 2 to 5 short films. When the short films air on the channel, they become available to stream on Logo's website. Viewers are then able to rate the films, and the top rated films air in the finale episode. Some of the short films also became available for streaming on mobile carriers as well as for download on sites such as iTunes, AOL, and Amazon.

Beginning with Season 2, most of the short films were introduced by the filmmaker, and at the end of the film, a taped closing statement aired during the credits. Additional information on the filmmaker also air during the credits.

Several special editions centered on a theme or genre have also aired. These include a "Horror Edition," "Fantasy Edition," and a "NewFest Edition."

== Season 1 ==
Premiered on March 2, 2006. Films include:

- Baker's Men
- Bikini
- Billy's Dad Is a Fudge-Packer! *
- Blow
- Dani & Alice
- Fairies *
- Getting to Know You
- Gillery's Little Secret *
- Half Laughing
- Hello, Thanks
- Hi Maya
- The Homolulu Show
- I Like Mike
- Listen
- Little Black Boot *
- Memoirs of an Evil Stepmother
- The Mezzos
- Mostly Willing *
- Oedipus N+1
- On the Low
- One Fine Day a Hairdresser
- The P-P-P-Pick Up
- Promtroversy
- Recruiting
- Seeing You in Circles
- Sissy Frenchfry (also aired in Season 2)
- Stuck
- Target Audience
- Transit
- A Woman Reported
- A Wonderful Day (also aired in Season 2)

* = Season 1 winners

== Season 2 ==
Premiered on October 10, 2006. Films include:

- Available Men
- The Bridge
- Brooklyn's Bridge to Jordan *
- Cabalerno
- Cairo Calling
- Clay Pride
- Cosa Bella
- A Funny Thing Happened on the Way to the Funeral
- Hitchcocked
- Katie and Kasey
- Moustache
- Night Swimming *
- Out Now
- Perfect Filtration
- The Piper
- Running Without Sound
- Sarang Song
- Sissy Frenchfry (also aired in Season 1) *
- Straight Boys
- Straight Hike for the Butch Dyke
- Such Great Joy
- This Boy
- Transgression
- Transient
- Triple Minority
- Tumbleweed Town
- The Underminer
- Uninvited
- A Wonderful Day (also aired in Season 1)

* = Season 2 winners

== Season 3 ==
Premiered on March 14, 2007. Films include:

- Beyond Lovely *
- Blood
- Breaking Up Really Sucks
- Butler
- Can You Take It?
- Cupboard Love
- Dad, I'm Not Gay
- Daddy's Boy
- Ex
- Give or Take an Inch *
- Inclinations
- Intent
- Layover
- Man Seeking Man
- Modern Day Arranged Marriage
- Mona Lisa
- My Crazy Life
- The Nearly Unadventurous Life of Zoe Cadwaulder *
- Outside
- Peking Turkey
- Praise the Dead
- Rapid Guy Movement
- Rug Burn
- She Kills He *
- Standing Up *
- Summer
- Testify
- Unspoken
- Waiting
- Where We Began

* = Season 3 winners

== Season 4 ==
Premiered on October 10, 2007.

- 5 Telephone Conversations
- A Bear, Where?
- Airplanes
- Best Mates
- Bugcrush
- Casting Pearls *
- Coif
- Companionist
- Dare *
- Gay Zombie
- Guy 101
- I'm not gay
- Kali Ma
- Last Exit
- Maid of Honor
- Red Velvet Girls - Signage
- Sunday Afternoon
- The Best Men *
- The Call
- The Happiest Day of His Life *
- The Offering
- The Police Box
- The Science of Love
- What Hot Guy?

* = Season 4 winners

== Season 5 ==
Premiered April 2008.

- 41 Sekunden
- Backstroke
- Chalk Lines
- Cowboy Forever
- Dirty Love
- Eddie
- Filled with Water
- Float
- In Memory of Me
- In the Place of the Dead
- JO FM *
- Just
- Le Weekend
- My Last 10 Hours With You
- Postmortem
- Prada Handbag
- Private Life
- Red/Blue
- Solace *
- The Incredible Dyke *
- Two Nights
- Vibracall
- Waiting for Yvette *
- Wingtips

* = Season 5 winners

== Season 6 ==
Premiered September 24, 2008.

- Center of the Universe
- The Closet *
- Daddy
- Donny & Ginger
- Doorman
- Fighter
- For the Love of God
- Fresh Like Strawberries
- Happenstance *
- Happy Birthday
- Heartland
- Hearts and Hotel Rooms *
- Hirsute
- I Heart Veronica Martin
- In Twilight's Shadow *
- Laundromat
- Long Ago
- Nourishment *
- Mars
- Peace Talk
- Pitstop
- Portrait of a Couple
- Ready? OK!
- Scarred
- Succubus
- Wicked Desire

* = Season 6 winners
