= Mountain House, California =

City in California, United States

- City; Former census designated place
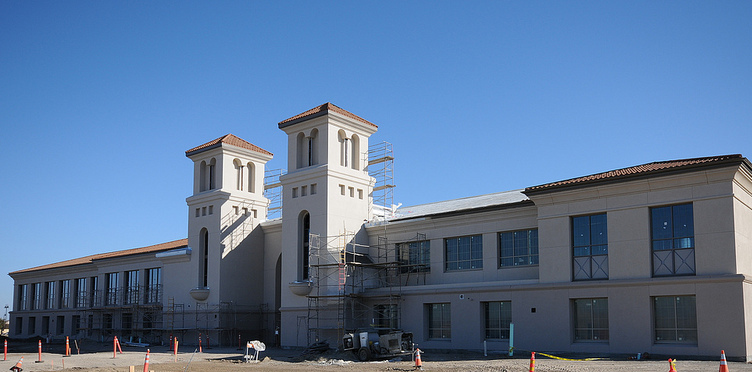
- Mountain House High School

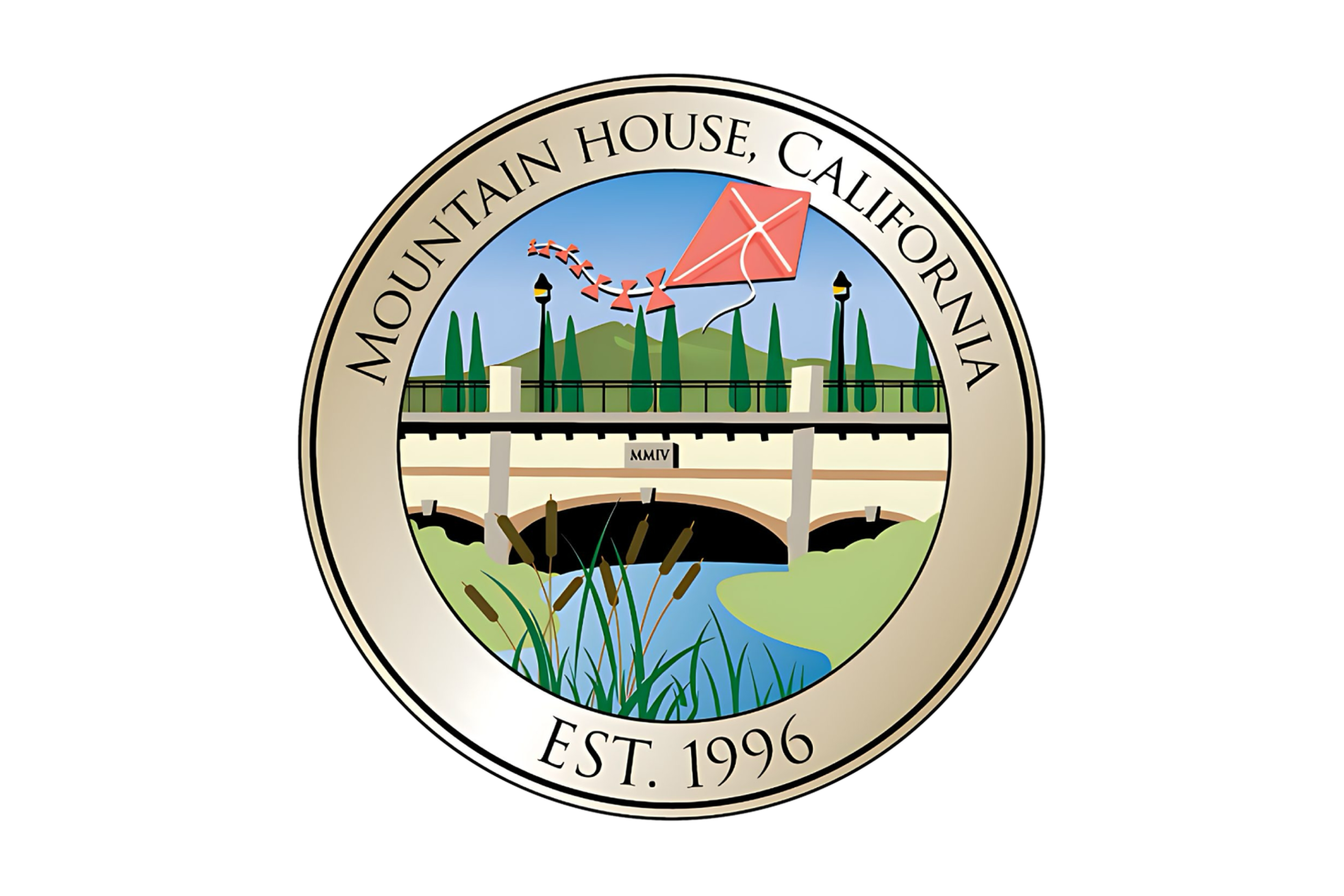
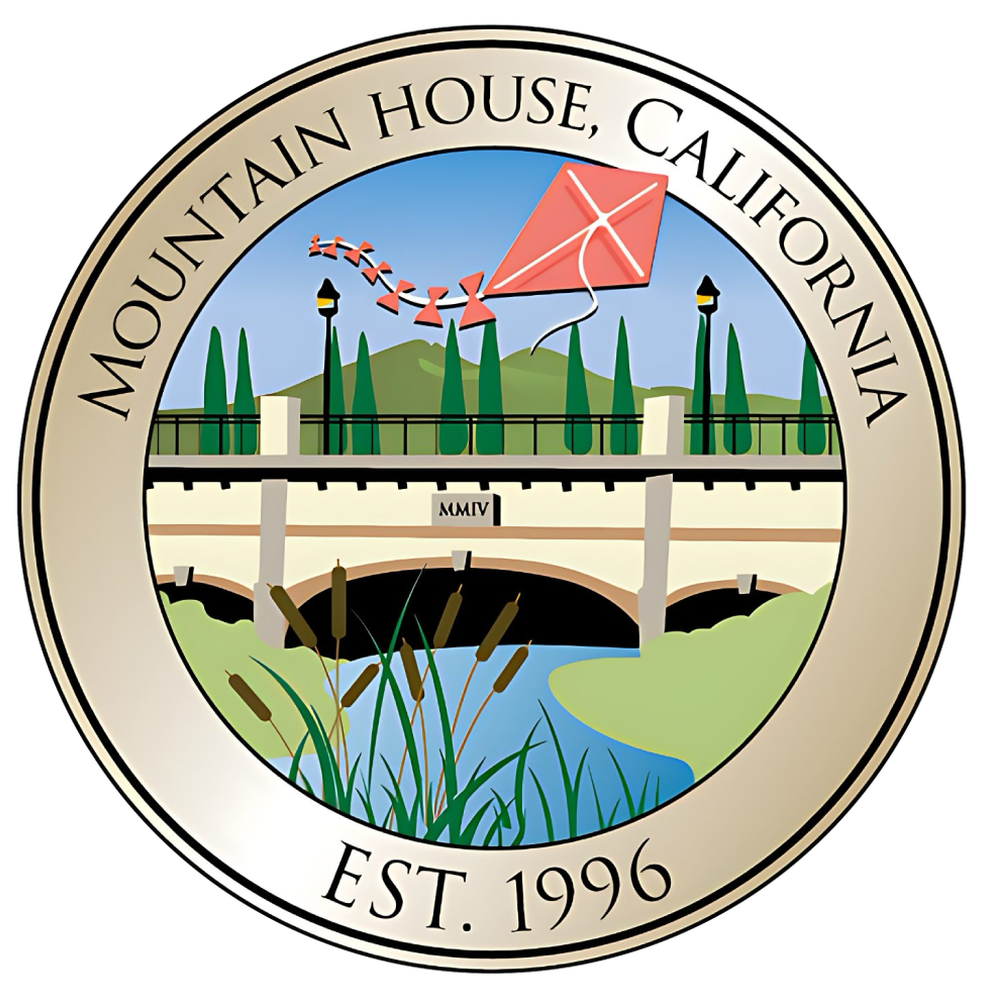
- Flag Seal
- Coordinates: 37°46′26″N 121°32′39″W
- Country: United States
- State: California
- County: San Joaquin
- Established: May 14, 2001
- Incorporated (city): July 1, 2024

Government
  - Type: Council Manager

Area
  - Total: 7.441 sq mi (19.271 km^{2})
  - Land: 7.436 sq mi (19.259 km^{2})
  - Water: 0.0046 sq mi (0.012 km^{2}) 0.06%
- Elevation: 82 ft (25 m)

Population (2020)
  - Total: 24,499
  - Estimate (2025): 25,315
  - Density: 3,294.7/sq mi (1,272.1/km^{2})
- Time zone: UTC−8 (Pacific Time Zone)
  - Summer (DST): UTC−7 (PDT)
- ZIP codes: 95391
- Area code: 209
- FIPS code: 06-49582
- GNIS feature IDs: 1888888, 2628761
- Website: Official website

Mountain House is a city on the western edge of San Joaquin County, California, United States, lying just east of the historical waystop Mountain House in Alameda County. The planned community was originally approved by the San Joaquin County Board of Supervisors in 1994 and construction was officially started in 2001. Mountain House was then incorporated in 2024. As of the 2020 census, when Mountain House was still classified as a census-designated place, the population was 24,499.

== History ==
In 1849, Thomas Goodall erected a blue denim cloth tent to serve as a midway stopover for gold miners headed from San Francisco to the Sierra Nevada foothills via Altamont Pass. Goodall eventually built an adobe house at the eastern edge of the Diablo Range hills, calling it The Mountain House. Simon Zimmerman later acquired the stop and it became known as Zimmerman's Mountain House and became a well-known way station stop on the way to Stockton. The last remaining settlement buildings were leveled in 1940.

In November 1994, the San Joaquin County Board of Supervisors officially approved the new community of Mountain House. In 1996, the master plan was approved. In August 2000, many of the documents controlling the development and growth of Mountain House were adopted and approved by the San Joaquin Board of Supervisors acting as the Mountain House Board of Directors.

Mountain House was projected to be a small full-fledged city developed over a 30-year period by the Master Developer Trimark Communities. The community covers 4,784 acres (1,936 ha) in San Joaquin County. The town was planned for 12 distinct neighborhoods including 10 family neighborhoods and two age-restricted neighborhoods, each organized around a center containing a neighborhood park, a K-8 school, and a small commercial area.

Construction began in 2001, but growth slowed down to about 50 permits per year because of the Great Recession in 2008. Development started again with increasing building permits and small land development projects in 2010 and 2011 and has continued at a high rate.

As of 2013, Mountain House included the established villages of Wicklund, Bethany, Altamont, Questa, Hansen, Cordes, and College Park. Some 15,000 households or approximately 45,000–50,000 people are anticipated when Mountain House is fully completed.

Local control led Mountain House residents to seek incorporation as California's newest city in 2024. In the March primary election, more than 90% of voting residents voted for incorporation. The city officially came into existence on July 1, 2024, and celebrated with a ceremony on July 4.

=== Milestones ===
- November 10, 1994 – Mountain House project approved by San Joaquin County Board of Supervisors.
- May 14, 2001 – Trimark breaks ground on Mountain House project.
- January 18, 2003 – First home foundation poured.
- August 24, 2004 – Wicklund Elementary School opens. MHCSD opens an office at Wicklund Elementary School.
- November 6, 2007 – Mountain House votes to form an independent board for the MH Community Services District (MHCSD).
- December 7, 2007 – The San Joaquin Delta College satellite campus site is annexed to Mountain House CSD through a public-private partnership with developer Gerry N. Kamilos.
- November 2008 – Noted for having the highest percentage of underwater mortgages in the U.S.
- November 2008 – First independent board of the MHCSD was elected.
- August 17, 2009 – Delta College Mountain House Campus opens.
- June 8, 2010 – Voters approve unification of Lammersville Unified School District.
- January 2011 – 15-year-old resident Thia Megia becomes youngest finalist ever on American Idol.
- July 2012 – Mountain House High School breaks ground.
- August 2014 – Mountain House High School opens.
- June 2015 – Drought conditions place Mountain House water supply at risk.
- September 2018 – Mountain House breaks ground on town hall complex.
- March 2020 – Town Hall and Library opens
- January 12, 2022 – A large retail center opens in Cordes Village
- March 5, 2024 – Voters approve Measure D to incorporate to become San Joaquin County's 8th city
- July 1, 2024 – Officially incorporated

=== Financial downturn ===
In November 2008, The New York Times reported that Mountain House was the "most underwater community in America" – the ZIP code with the highest amount of negative equity on its homes. With home values decreasing across the nation, Mountain House was described as the worst-hit, with 90% of its homes worth less than the amount their owners owe in mortgages. The average homeowner in Mountain House was reported to be $122,000 in debt. Many local businesses in the 95391 ZIP code were closing because the homeowners were cutting back on their spending.

CalPERS, an agency that manages pensions for California public employees, invested heavily in Mountain House beginning in 2005, purchasing approximately 9,000 residential lots from Shea Homes. By May 2010, the $1.12 billion investment by CalPERS had been reduced to 18% of that figure: $200 million. Even though home values had dropped significantly, CalPERS determined that they would hold on to the investment, counting on a recovery of the housing market.

=== Economic recovery ===
An uptick in economic performance at Mountain House was noted in September 2011 by Big Builder, a trade magazine of major land and housing development published by Hanley-Wood.

In April 2012, Big Builder again reported on the community, noting more robust first-quarter sales, new lot offers, and flexibility for semi-finished and raw land in future development.

== Geography ==
Mountain House lies on the foothills of the Diablo Range, and close to the Altamont Pass which is over 1,000 feet (300 m) in elevation. It is on the border of Alameda and Contra Costa counties. According to the United States Census Bureau, the CDP covers an area of 7.5 square miles (19.3 km^{2}), nearly all of it land. The community is bisected by Mountain House Creek. Mountain House Creek originates south of the Altamont Pass and Interstate 580, flowing northeasterly along and crossing under the interstate, then along Grant Line Road to the intersection with Mountain House Road at the historic Alameda County Mountain House. The creek continues northeasterly through the residential communities of Mountain House before emptying into the Old River, a distributary of the San Joaquin River.

=== Climate ===
Climate data for Tracy Pumping Plant (1991–2020 normals, extremes 1955–present)
Month	Jan	Feb	Mar	Apr	May	Jun	Jul	Aug	Sep	Oct	Nov	Dec	Year
Record high °F (°C)	74 (23)	77 (25)	88 (31)	97 (36)	107 (42)	112 (44)	112 (44)	111 (44)	112 (44)	102 (39)	85 (29)	74 (23)	112 (44)
Mean daily maximum °F (°C)	56.3 (13.5)	61.9 (16.6)	67.4 (19.7)	73.2 (22.9)	80.2 (26.8)	88.1 (31.2)	93.3 (34.1)	92.5 (33.6)	88.8 (31.6)	79.1 (26.2)	65.6 (18.7)	56.6 (13.7)	75.2 (24.0)
Daily mean °F (°C)	48.4 (9.1)	52.8 (11.6)	57.2 (14.0)	61.7 (16.5)	67.7 (19.8)	73.7 (23.2)	77.6 (25.3)	77.2 (25.1)	74.5 (23.6)	66.8 (19.3)	55.9 (13.3)	48.5 (9.2)	63.5 (17.5)
Mean daily minimum °F (°C)	40.5 (4.7)	43.7 (6.5)	47.0 (8.3)	50.2 (10.1)	55.2 (12.9)	59.4 (15.2)	61.9 (16.6)	61.9 (16.6)	60.2 (15.7)	54.5 (12.5)	46.1 (7.8)	40.3 (4.6)	51.7 (10.9)
Record low °F (°C)	18 (−8)	23 (−5)	25 (−4)	29 (−2)	34 (1)	37 (3)	44 (7)	42 (6)	40 (4)	30 (−1)	24 (−4)	17 (−8)	17 (−8)
Average precipitation inches (mm)	2.51 (64)	2.32 (59)	1.60 (41)	0.84 (21)	0.52 (13)	0.13 (3.3)	0.00 (0.00)	0.01 (0.25)	0.08 (2.0)	0.67 (17)	1.32 (34)	2.37 (60)	12.37 (314)
Average snowfall inches (cm)	0.0 (0.0)	0.0 (0.0)	0.0 (0.0)	0.0 (0.0)	0.0 (0.0)	0.0 (0.0)	0.0 (0.0)	0.0 (0.0)	0.0 (0.0)	0.0 (0.0)	0.0 (0.0)	0.0 (0.0)	0.0 (0.0)
Average precipitation days (≥ 0.01 in)	12.9	9.6	8.4	4.8	2.7	0.9	0.0	0.3	0.5	2.5	6.7	11.8	61.1
Average snowy days (≥ 0.1 in)	0.0	0.0	0.0	0.0	0.0	0.0	0.0	0.0	0.0	0.0	0.0	0.0	0.0
Source: NOAA

== Demographics ==
Historical population
Census	Pop.	Note	%±
2010	9,675		—
2020	24,499		153.2%
2025 (est.)	25,315	▲	3.3%
U.S. Decennial Census; 1850–1870 1880-1890; 1900 1910 1920; 1930 1940 1950; 1960 1970 1980; 1990 2000 2010

Mountain House first appeared as a census designated place in the 2010 U.S. census. In 2024, Mountain House incorporated as a city.

The 2010 Census reported that Mountain House had a population of 9,675. The 2020 Census reported that Mountain House had a population of 24,499, an increase of 153% over the decade.

In 2020, 42% of the population was age 18 or younger and 6% were above age 65.

In 2020, Mountain House grew increasingly diverse with a population that is now 54.6% Asian, 18.7% Non-Hispanic White, 13% Hispanic and 7.3% black, and 9.5% two or more races; 45% of the population have a bachelor's degree or higher.

There were 5,948 households in 2020 and the median household income was $154,347.

== Government ==
United States presidential election results for Mountain House, California
Year	Republican		Democratic		Third party(ies)	
Year	No.	%	No.	%	No.	%
2024	3,047	39.28%	4,198	54.11%	513	6.61%

The Mountain House Community Services District (MHCSD) provided services from 2008 until the city incorporated on July 1, 2024. Before 2008, all services were provided by San Joaquin County.

The MHCSD had 18 primary powers which include providing police (contracted with San Joaquin Sheriffs), fire (contracted with French Camp Fire), library services, water, sewer, garbage (contracted with West Valley Disposal), public recreation, road maintenance, street lights, graffiti abatement, CC&R (Master Restrictions) enforcement, telecommunication services, converting utilities to underground, transportation services, flood control protection, wildlife habitat mitigation, pest and weed abatement, and dissemination of information.

In the March 5, 2024 election, Dr Andy Su was elected as the first Mayor of Mountain House. Matt Disko, Dan Harrision, Bernice Tingle and Ronna Green were elected as the first city council members. Steve Pinkerton is the first city manager of Mountain House.

== Education ==
Mountain House is entirely within the Lammersville Joint Unified School District. The district became a unified school district in 2010; previously it was a K-8 school district while students attended Tracy Unified School District for high school. Mountain House High School (MHHS) opened in 2014. The mascot of the high school is the Mustangs. The school colors are royal and silver.

There are currently nine K-8 schools in the district (Lammersville, Wicklund, Bethany, Questa, Altamont, Cordes, Hansen, Costa, Pombo). All but one (Lammersville) are within city limits.

Mountain House Elementary School is a K–8 school in unincorporated Alameda County, run by the Mountain House Elementary School District.

The south campus of the San Joaquin Delta College opened in 2020, and is located in the College Park Village of Mountain House.

== Parks and recreation ==
Mountain House has many community events. In Central Park, a well-known conducted event is “Music in the Park”, where the community gathers to listen to a variety of rotating bands that play different eras of music. This is a monthly outdoor event in the summer to dance, visit vendors, and spend time.

== Media ==
Mountain House Matters is a monthly publication about Mountain House, its people, and activities.

The Tracy Press is a weekly newspaper that covers Tracy and Mountain House.

== Infrastructure ==
=== Transportation ===
==== Public transportation ====
The nearest railway station is in Tracy, operated by Altamont Corridor Express (ACE). Livermore Amador Valley Transit Authority provides bus service to Hacienda Business Park and the Dublin/Pleasanton BART station. San Joaquin RTD provides van service to the Tracy Transit Center.

==== Major highways ====
Interstate 205 serves as the closest major highway to Mountain House, which runs just south of the community and is connected via an interchange at Mountain House Parkway (exit 2). Mountain House Parkway then proceeds by an overpass above I-205 where it becomes International Parkway in Tracy and connects to the southeasterly terminus of Interstate 580 which eventually merges with Interstate 5 near Vernalis south of Tracy.
