= Joe Stefanelli =

Joseph Leonard Stefanelli (born September 11, 1960, in San Francisco) is an American musician and actor, of Italian descent, who is best known for performing the voice of John Lennon in the 1994 film Forrest Gump.

Stefanelli arrived into the world of entertainment in 1989, by a chance meeting through a mutual friend who asked him to sit in on some jam sessions with Duncan Faure, a former lead singer of the Bay City Rollers. Duncan had recently been in touch with Ian Mitchell and the two decided to get a band together and rehash old BCR songs. Duncan volunteered Joe to play bass, though Joe could only play an acoustic guitar. In just two weeks, Joe accomplished the bass guitar and went on tour with the group. This was just the beginning of his life in music.

In 1992, Joe decided to try out for a spot as John Lennon in Beatles tribute bands throughout the Los Angeles area. Most of the bands didn't have what Joe was looking for, so he started his own band, The Mop Tops. In the next 10 years, the Mop Tops toured the world, played Candlestick Park and Dodger Stadium, and made hundreds of personal appearances. Based on this experience, Joe was hand-picked by director Robert Zemeckis to be the voice of John Lennon in Forrest Gump.

Today, Stefanelli resides in Southern California.
